= Daisy (perfume) =

2007 pPerfume by Marc Jacobs

Fragrance by Marc Jacobs
- Category: Floral woody musk
- Designed for: Women
- Top notes: Violet leaf, grapefruit, strawberry
- Heart notes: Violet, gardenia, jasmine
- Base notes: Musk, white woods, vanilla
- Released: 2007
- Label: Marc Jacobs
- Perfumer(s): Alberto Morillas
- Awards: 2008 FiFi Fragrance of the Year, Women's Luxe; 2008 FiFi Best Packaging, Women's Prestige

"Daisy" is an eau de toilette perfume by American fashion designer Marc Jacobs, which debuted in 2007. Since 2018, it has been the readers' choice of Allure's Best of Beauty awards.

== Fragrance, line extensions, and flankers ==
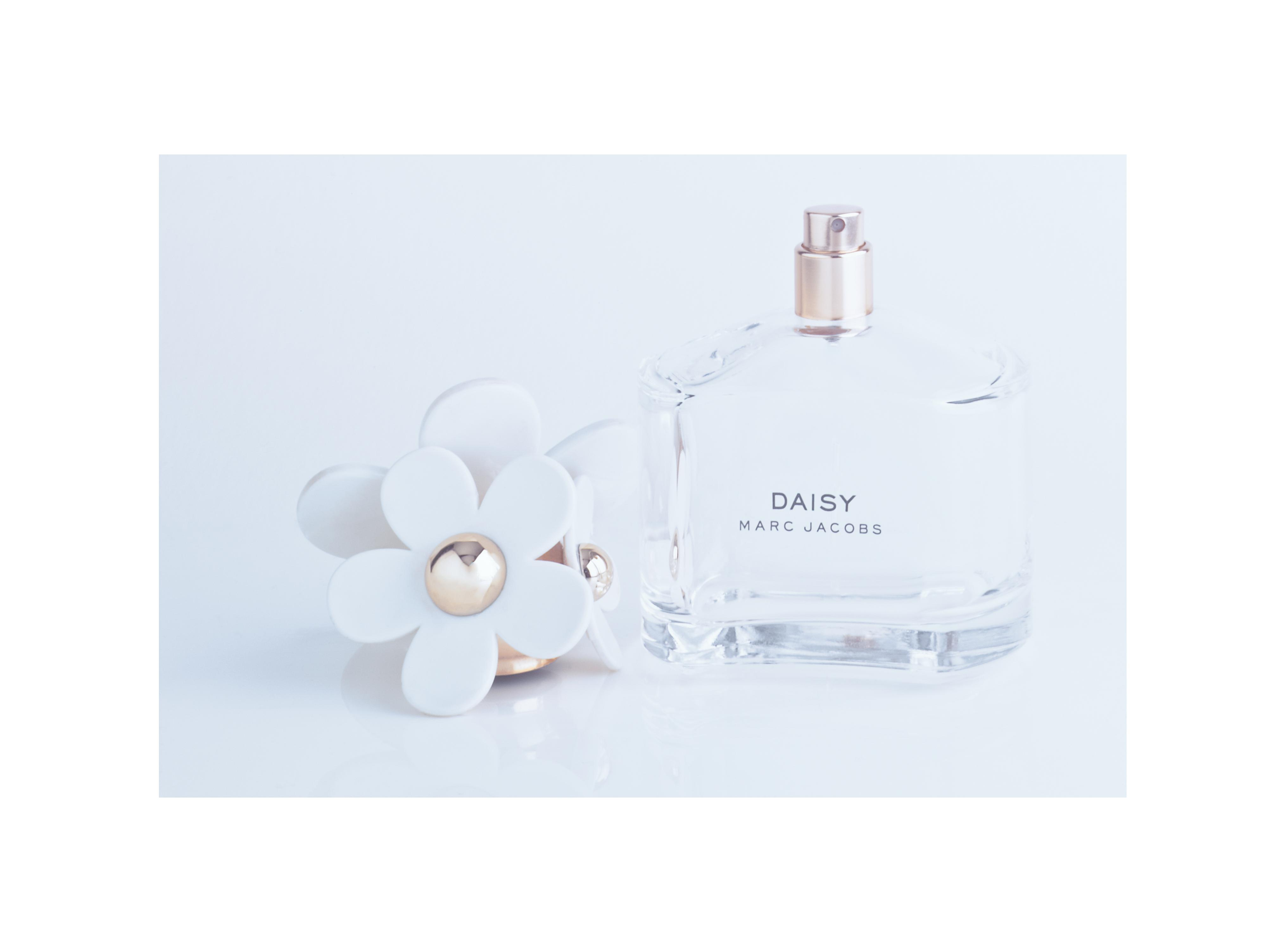
A bottle of Daisy.

Alberto Morillas of Firmenich created the formulas for Daisy fragrances. Daisy now includes multiple collections and flankers, including Eau So Fresh, Eau So Intense, Eau So Sweet, Daisy Dream, Daisy Dream Daze, Daisy Dream Twinkle, Daisy Love, Daisy Love Skies, Daisy Love Daze, Daisy Sunshine, Daisy Hot Pink, and Daisy Spring.

=== Marketing ===
For the first three years of the product, Russian model Irina Kulikova was the face of the advertisements. The first television advertisement for the perfume featured Swedish, American, and Hungarian models Frida Gustavsson, Hannah Holman, and Sophie Srej, filmed in Spain by Jacobs's frequent collaborator Juergen Teller.

A commercial for Daisy Eau So Fresh directed by Sofia Coppola featured American model Ondria Hardin, British model Malaika Firth, British-German model Sophia Ahrens, and German model Antonia Wesseloh.

Daisy Love has been represented by American models Meghan Roche, Kaia Gerber, and Australian model Adut Akech. Gerber has also appeared in campaigns for Daisy Love Eau So Sweet with American model Faith Lynch and Haitian model Aube Jolicoeur; and is the face of Eau So Intense.

The perfume's brand identity is said to embody the cottagecore trend among young women.
