= Penhaligon =

Penhaligon is a surname originating in Cornwall, Great Britain. Notable people with the surname include:

- William Penhaligon (1837–1902), Cornish barber and perfumer, founder of Penhaligon's
- David Penhaligon (1944–1986), Liberal MP from Cornwall
- Dame Annette Penhaligon (born 1946), British politician
- Susan Penhaligon (born 1949), British actress

== Other ==
- Penhaligon's, English perfume house
- The Penhaligon Trilogy, a series set in the Mystara realm of Dungeons & Dragons
- Penhaligon, a type of shot used in the game of Tiddlywinks
