= Penhaligon's =

British perfume house

- Industry: Perfumery
- Founded: 1870 in London, England
- Founders: William Henry Penhaligon
- Website: www.penhaligons.com

Penhaligon's is a British perfume house founded in the late 1860s by William Henry Penhaligon, a Cornish barber who moved to London and became Court Barber and Perfumer to Queen Victoria.

== History of family ownership ==
Three generations of Penhaligons owned the company before it faded into obscurity.

=== William Penhaligon and William Jeavons (1870–1902) ===
In 1867, William Penhaligon began working at the hairdressing department at The Hammam and over time he began running the department. "Hammam" is a generic word meaning "bathhouse", but The Hammam, at 76 Jermyn Street in the St James's district of London, was a large and luxurious Victorian Turkish bath built under David Urquhart's direction with plans designed by Somers Clarke. It had opened five years earlier with an extensive review and drawings in The Illustrated London News.

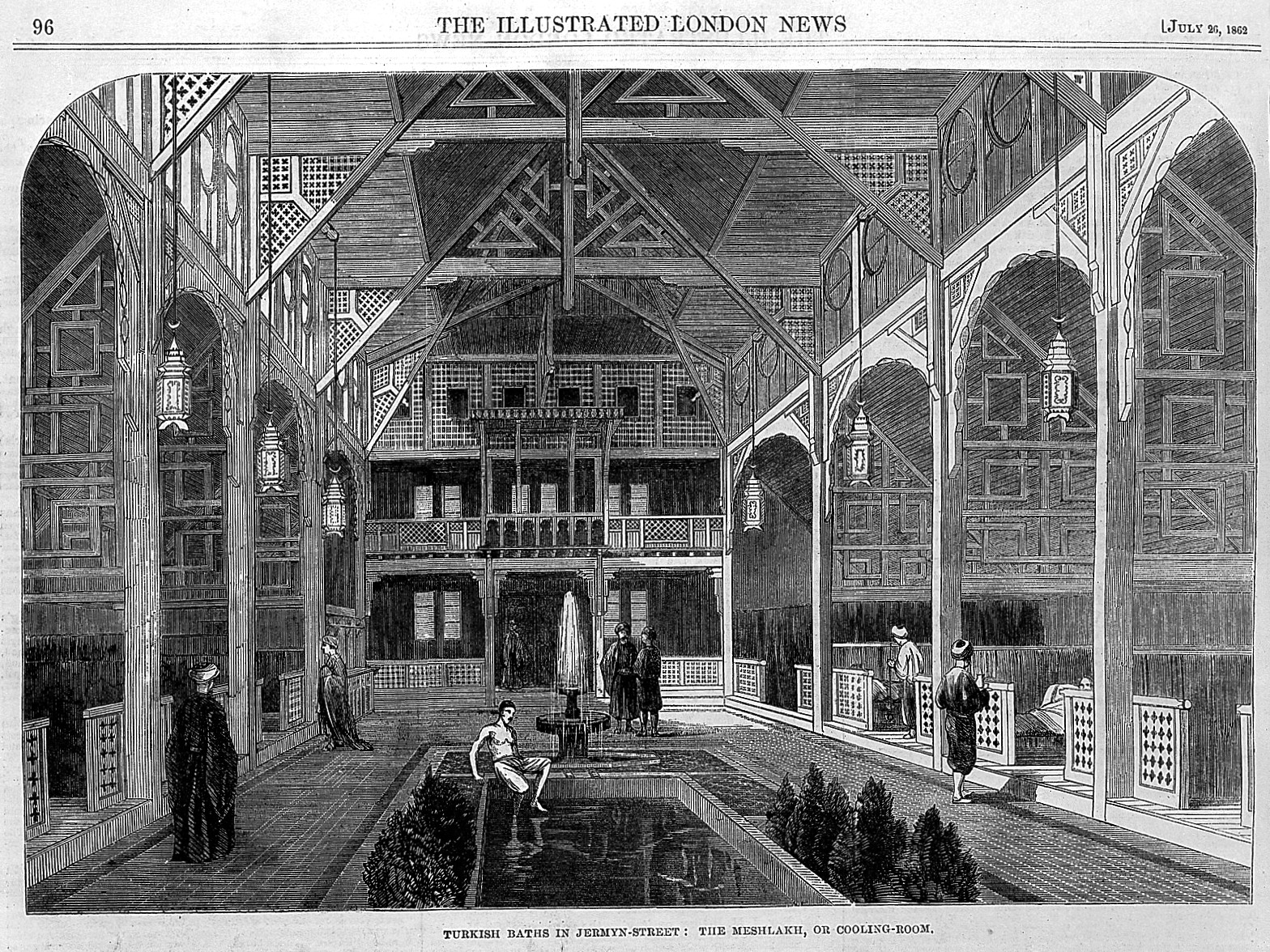
The Hammam's cooling room

At that time, barbers often created basic toilet waters and hair tonics to use at the barber chair such as lavender waters and citrus splashes. Penhaligon's barbershop offered several of these, and the fragrances of these early toilet waters have been recreated, modernized, and reissued as commercial products by the company over the years, including Eau de Verveine, Eau Sans Pareil, Esprit de Lavande, Esprit du Roi, and Extract of Limes. His first commercial fine fragrance was Hammam Bouquet (1872), which he marketed as specifically inspired by the bathhouse in which he worked.

In 1880, he and a hairdresser named William Millard Jeavons (Note: Contemporary newspapers refer to him only as "Mr. Jeavons". The 1882 Post Office London Directory lists a William Millard Jeavons, hairdresser, with a cross-reference to the firm of Penhaligon & Jeavons, and a notice to creditors in The London Gazette for William Millard Jeavons, hairdresser and perfumer, of Beaufort Street, Fulham Road, and gives his date of death as 4 May 1902.) formed Penhaligon & Jeavons, and in 1887 William Penhaligon's son, Walter, joined the company. They created two fragrances in 1890: English Fern (1890) and Blenheim Bouquet (1890), the latter commissioned by Charles Spencer-Churchill, 9th Duke of Marlborough.

In 1891, they moved from The Hammam to two locations a block away: 33 St James's Street and 66 Jermyn Street. An article that year noted that the shop had a large collection of fragrances, including Patrician Essence, Maréchal, and Cornubian Bouquet; an eau de toilette with notes of pine and eucalyptus that was deemed both useful and agreeable; a bay rum skin tonic and hair dressing; and shampooing and hair-cutting services for men and women. That same year, they released several new fragrances: Zizonia, White Lilac, Brise de Violette, and Wallflower. An 1892 article described the shop at 33 St. James's, mentioned their 'world-renowned Hammam Bouquet', noting that the perfumes were in cut-glass bottles set in cases made of tortoiseshell, mother-of-pearl, and leather, and that the shop also sold Farina gegenüber Eau de Cologne (1709).

In April 1902, William Penhaligon died and Walter became a partner in the company. Three weeks after William Penhaligon died, Mr. Jeavons also died, which left Walter Penhaligon the sole proprietor of the company which was renamed Penhaligon's. In January 1903, the Penhaligon and Jeavons company received their first royal warrant, from Queen Alexandra, with the right to use the Royal Arms.

=== Walter Penhaligon (1902–1921) ===
Walter was educated in North London and in Germany. After finishing his formal education, his father placed him for training with Julius Brauner, a hairdresser on Southhampton Row, for two years. Afterward, Walter faced health problems and so he lived in his father's native town of Penzance to recover before beginning work in the laboratory, manufacturing perfume for Penhaligon and Jeavons. Under his leadership, the company exported its perfumes to agents in Europe, the British colonies, South America, India, and China.

A 1909 London newspaper identified Walter Penhaligon as 'one of the leading West End hairdressers' and a master of a guild for hairdressers, who spoke out against the dangerous practice of using petrol and carbon tetrachloride as a dry shampoo. He also created several fragrances: Elisabethan Rose (1910), Cornubia (1910), whose name is a Latinised form of the Old English word for his father's homeland of Cornwall, and Douro Eau de Portugal (1911), which originally—like Blenheim Bouquet (1902) before it—was a private commission and not available for sale to the public. Its creation was commissioned by Percy Croft for his personal use. The House of Croft is one of the oldest port wine shippers, and Percy Croft was a member of that family and worked as a London director for the company.

But by 1918, Walter's health was failing and his son Leonard began leading Penhaligon's. In 1921, Walter Penhaligon died.

=== Leonard Penhaligon (1921–1962) ===
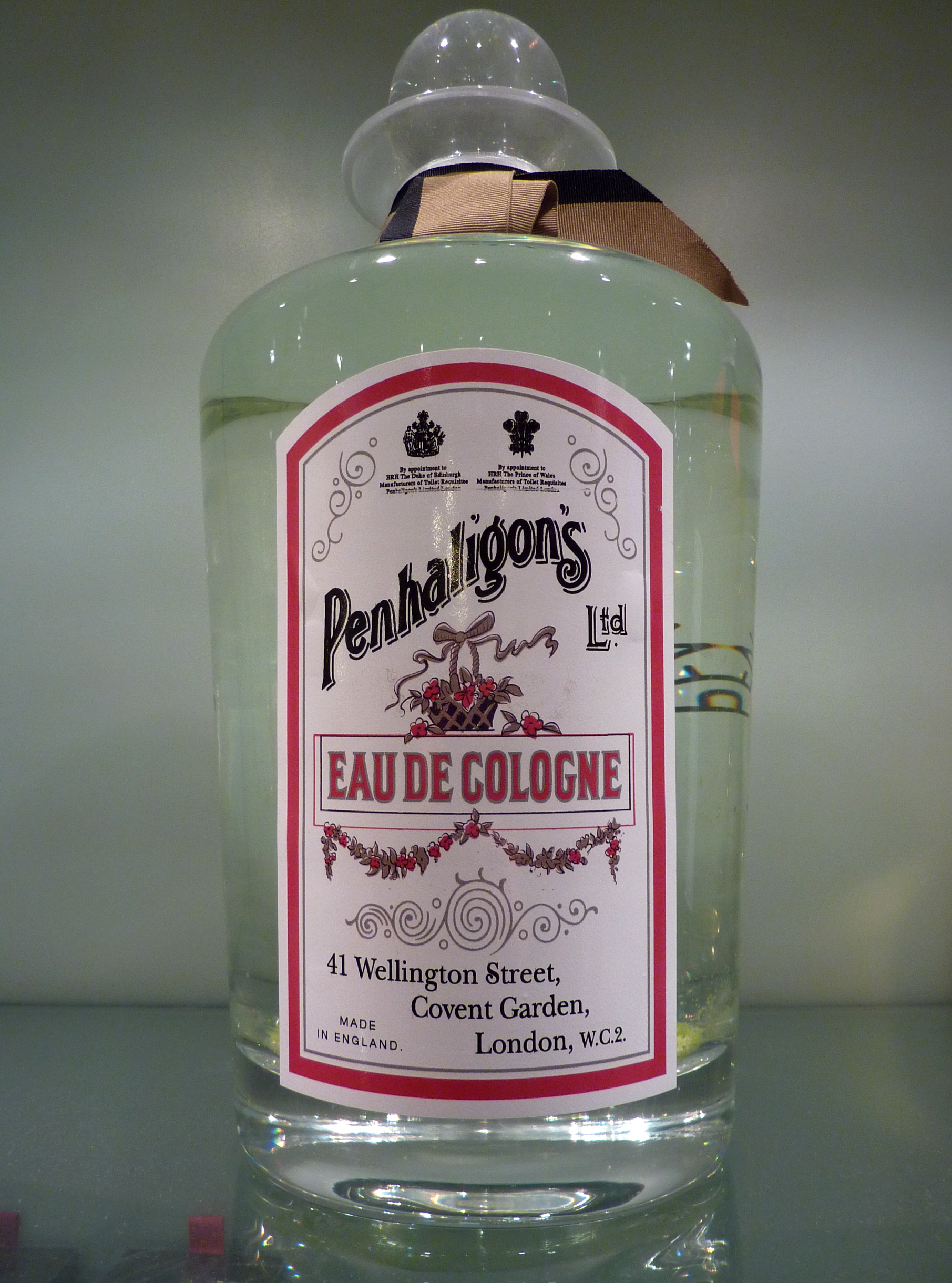
Eau de Cologne (1927)

Penhaligon's barbershop attracted prominent customers from politics and finance. During Walter Penhaligon's time, the banker Alfred de Rothschild was reported to have used the same Penhaligon barber for many years and to have left him £3,000 in his will. In 1927, a Mr. Penhaligon told the Liverpool Evening Express that Joseph Chamberlain had been a customer in his father's time, that Lord Birkenhead was then a customer, and that David Lloyd George, who had once come regularly to the shop, had for the last few years been attended at his headquarters by the firm's chief assistant. In 1946, a newspaper reported that George Ernest Parry, a barber with Penhaligon's since 1890, would be making a house call from the Bury Street shop to Winston Churchill, and that Parry had also cut the hair of other Prime Ministers including Lord Salisbury, Arthur Balfour, Lloyd George and Neville Chamberlain.

In the late 1920s, the business moved to Bury Street. The original buildings were destroyed in The Blitz in 1941, but the store on Bury Street remained untouched.

In December 1955, Penhaligon's Ltd. received their second royal warrant, from Philip, Duke of Edinburgh, with the right to display the Duke of Edinburgh's Arms.

== Modern corporate ownership ==
=== Truefitt & Hill (1962–1975) ===
In late 1962, Penhaligon's merged with Truefitt & Hill, a similar nearby business. There were no new Penhaligon's fragrances under Truefitt & Hill, but they did reissue Extract of Limes in 1963.

By October 1971, Ivan Bersch owned Truefitt & Hill on Old Bond Street (as well as Trumper's and his self-named Ivan's on Jermyn Street). The Penhaligon's brand slowly fell into obscurity.

=== Sheila Pickles and Franco Zeffirelli (1975–1987) ===
Covent Garden storefront

The two elderly perfumers who still produced Penhaligon's fragrances retired. Franco Zeffirelli suggested to Sheila Pickles that she buy the brand. She did so, with financial backing from Zeffirelli, buying the Penhaligon's brand in 1975 when its revenue was down to £6,000. The elderly perfumers taught her the blending, and she attended a perfumery course at a technical college, where she met a perfumer who helped her understand the Penhaligon's formula books. Pickles hired Michael Peters's firm for the complete corporate identity and product branding, which leaned into the company's history and nostalgic appeal. Peters's firm designed the new store at London's Covent Garden to look the way people imagine a Victorian-era shop and created a range of Victorian and Edwardian product packaging that were adorned with the Duke of Edinburgh's crests, bottles with neck ribbons, and specially-created typography and illustrations. The branding won awards such as a Starpack bronze award in 1979, a Design and Art Direction (D&AD) silver award in 1982, and the Presidential award from the Royal Society of Arts in 1983.

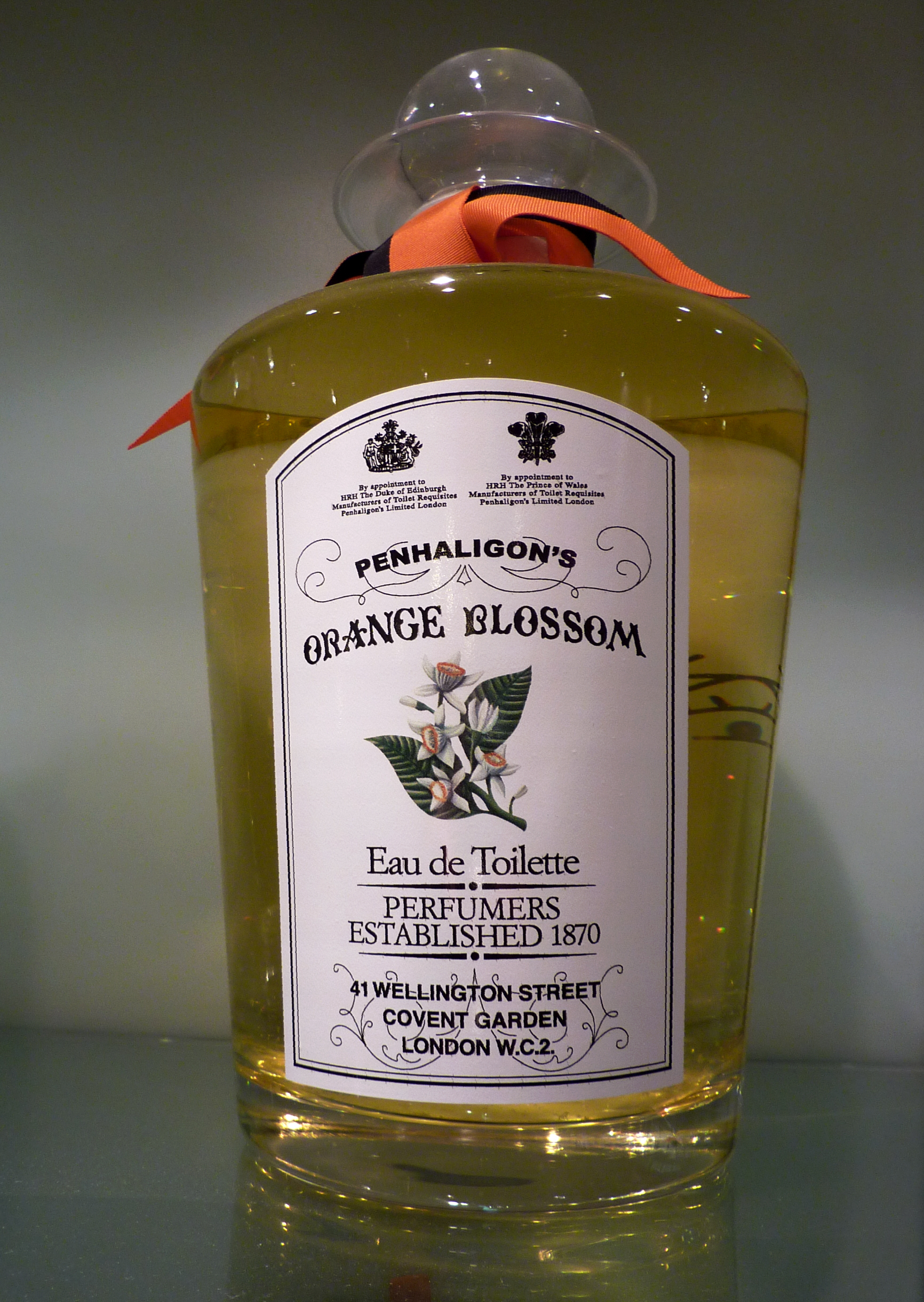
Orange Blossom (1976)

The first year, the new lone Penhaligon's store sold Hammam Bouquet (1872), English Fern (1890), Extract of Limes (1870), and Eau de Cologne (1927), which they also sold at Geo. F. Trumper and Truefitt & Hill. Over the next few years, they reissued other fragrances such as Blenheim Bouquet (1902), Elisabethan Rose (1910) and Douro (1911). In 1976, they released a collection of new floral perfumes and toilet waters. Notably, they worked with Michael Pickthall, co-founder of CPL Aromas for Lily of the Valley (1976) and Bluebell (1978). In 1979, they created Victorian Posy at the request of Roy Strong to complement the Victoria & Albert Museum's The Garden exhibition. Many of the fragrances they created or reissued in this period would later be used in their line of scented illustrated gift and stationery books when the brand was under Laura Ashley ownership.

By mid-1981, sales approached £500,000. In 1987, they had five shops in London and a factory at King's Cross, outlets in New York and Tokyo, and revenue of £1.2 million.

=== Laura Ashley (1987–1990) ===
In the mid-1980s, Laura Ashley was expanding following a successful IPO. They acquired several complementary brands including Sandringham Leather Goods Ltd., Bryant of Scotland, Willis & Geiger Outfitters, and Penhaligon's: they bought Penhaligon's in November 1987 for £1 million, keeping Pickles as a managing director and paying Zeffirelli £1,000 in Penhaligon's products each year, as a consultant. In December 1987, Penhaligon's Limited received their third royal warrant, from Charles, Prince of Wales, with the right to display the Prince of Wales Badge of Three Feathers.

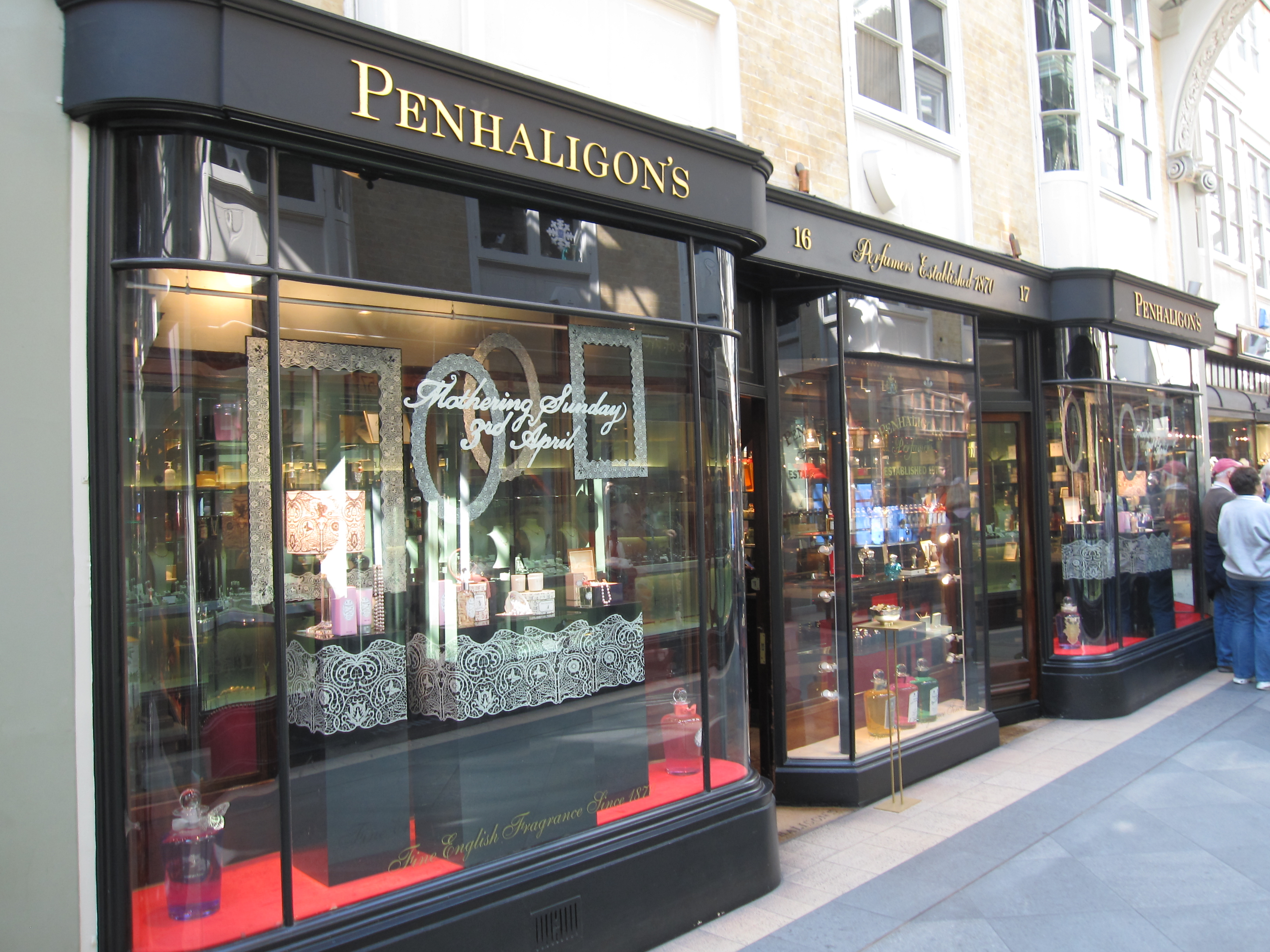
Penhaligon's store in the Burlington Arcade, London

In 1987, Penhaligon's released the first of their scented books, titled A Victorian Posy and scented with the 1979 fragrance of the same name. A biochemist created a technique for emulsifying their perfumes into a liquid that was added to the ink when the books were printed. The books were very successfully sold in gift shops, bookstores, clothing stores, and discount warehouses: In the first three years, A Victorian Posy sold 180,000 copies, and was quickly followed by Love in 1988 and scented with Elisabethan Rose (1910), Christmas in 1989 and scented with cinnamon and cloves, and The Language of Flowers in 1990 and scented with Violetta (1976), followed by other stationery books such as address books, photograph albums, diaries, and gardening journals.

In March 1989, they became embroiled in a legal dispute with The Limited. Laura Ashley filed a lawsuit accusing The Limited and their Victoria's Secret division of trade dress, saying the Victoria's Secret perfume bottles and packaging copied Penhaligon's after The Limited unsuccessfully tried to acquire Penhaligon's. In particular, the suit noted that Victoria's Secret Windsor Fern (1989) and Penhaligon's English Fern (1890) were both packaged in glass bottles with round stoppers, ribbons tied on the neck, and oblong labels with similar typeface, with the Penhaligon's label carrying the Duke of Edinburgh's coat of arms while the Victoria's Secret label had "Authorised Purveyors". In June 1989, the two companies reached a settlement.

By late 1989, Laura Ashley was having multiple problems affecting profits, and they divested or closed the newly-acquired brands that were not core to the Laura Ashley business.

=== The Limited (1990–1997) ===
In 1990, shortly after settling a legal battle with The Limited and their Victoria's Secret company for plagiarism, Laura Ashley sold Penhaligon's to The Limited for £7.5 million.

At that time, The Limited had only owned Victoria's Secret for a few years, and the marketing of both brands were very similar. Like Penhaligon's, Victoria's Secret stores had British Victorian-themed decor and its catalogue photos continued that theme of a romanticized imagination of 19th century British aesthetics from an "English heritage" brand. Their first Victoria's Secret logo had a faux royal crest and fictional London address. The year before acquiring Penhaligon's, Victoria's Secret launched a line of eight toiletries under a brand that referenced their fictional London address (Margaret Street Perfumes and Toiletries), and their stores offered bath products 'with an English country garden theme'. For the Christmas holidays, they advertised a Prestige Toiletries Collection consisting of 14 fragrances inspired by old England. And, in 1990 Victoria's Secret published several scented and illustrated books of poetry and prose that were 'modelled on the Penhaligon books'.

In 1990, The Limited separated Victoria's Secret's bed, bath, and fragrance lines into a separate business named Victoria's Secret Bath Shops and in The Limited's 1990 annual report, Victoria's Secret Bath Shops and Penhaligon's were showcased on facing pages, both in similar packaging and touting an English aesthetic, with the fictional London address given for Victoria's Secret.

While part of The Limited, Penhaligon's reissued several fragrances, such as Ormolu (1977, reissued in 1994), and several that had been reissued before, such as Eau Sans Pareil (1870, reissued under Laura Ashley in 1988 and under The Limited in 1992) and Extract of Limes (1870, reissued under Truefitt & Hill in 1963 and under The Limited in 1992). They also released one new fragrance: Quercus (1996), which was created by Christian Provenzano of CPL Aromas and marketed as a unisex fragrance for younger customers. Provenzano would go on to create at least 12 more fragrances for Penhaligon's through 2020.

In 1997, The Limited streamlined some of its divisions and sold Penhaligon's to Glynn Manson and Peter Kedge.

=== Glynn Manson and Peter Kedge, and Warnaco (1997–2002) ===
Glynn Manson and his wife Jacalyn Bennett were co-founders of GJM Group, a private label intimate apparel manufacturer whose main customer was Victoria's Secret. In February 1996, Warnaco Group bought GJM Group for $14 million. Peter Kedge was founder of SFE Systems/Dexion (North Asia) Limited, which he sold in 1994. Together, Manson and Kedge bought Penhaligon's in 1997, when it had four stores in the UK and sales at counters in a few exclusive department stores in the UK and US; annual sales were an estimated $16.2 million. Sheila Pickles continued to be its managing director until she left and in 2000 formed Starscents to produce celebrity fragrances.

In 1999, Warnaco—which had bought Manson's GJM Group three years earlier—acquired a 70% stake in Penhaligon's. Manson continued to run Penhaligon's as president. In June 2001, Warnaco filed for Chapter 11 bankruptcy. As part of the bankruptcy, Warnaco identified Penhaligon's as one of the businesses they would sell. In January 2002, the court approved the sale of Penhaligon's to Royal Holdings, for $11 million. The finalized deal resulted in Cradle Holdings officially taking ownership of Penhaligon's later that year.

=== Fox Paine & Company/Cradle Holdings (2002–2015) ===
In 2002, Fox Paine & Company, an American private equity firm focused on leveraged buyouts, bought Penhaligon's as part of their Cradle Holdings, which also owned the Erno Laszlo skincare company and the French perfume retailer L'Artisan Parfumeur.

From 2009 to 2011, Penhaligon's reformulated and reissued ten fragrances as part of their Anthology Collection. Four were released in 2009 (Eau de Verveine, Extract of Limes, Gardenia, and Night Scented Stock); four in 2010 (Eau de Cologne, Jubilee Bouquet, Orange Blossom, and Zizonia as recreated by Christian Provenzano), and two in 2011 (Eau Sans Pareil recreated by Beverley Bayne, and Esprit du Roi recreated by Bertrand Duchaufour).

In 2013, Maharaja Gaj Singh II commissioned Vaara, named for his granddaughter and with a scent authored by Bertrand Duchaufour that evokes the city of Jodhpur. The same year, they also released Iris Prima, created in collaboration with English National Ballet after perfumer Alberto Morillas observed dancers Nathan Young and Laurretta Summerscales.

Beginning in 2014, they released the first fragrances of the Trade Routes collection, which is marketed as scents inspired by London's 19th century shipping trade, with names like Empressa for trade from India, Halfeti for Turkey, and Levantium for the Middle East.

Penhaligon's expanded in Asia in 2013; sales increased 20% and profits were £1.1 million. Fox Paine & Company announced they were looking for a buyer.

=== Puig (2015– ) ===
Display of eight fragrances in the Portraits collection

In January 2015, Puig bought the Penhaligon's and L'Artisan Parfumeur parts of Cradle Holdings from Fox Paine & Company.

Under Puig, Penhaligon's released groups of scents marketed as a collection. In 2016, they began the Portraits collection with each fragrance given the name of a fictional Victorian family member: Lord George is deceptive; his wife Lady Blanche is vengeful; their daughter Duchess Rose is demure; and the Duke spends his nights at the theater. Each year is marketed as a "chapter" in the story, so that in 2017 they added Clandestine Clara who is romantically tied to Lord George, and so on. The bottle caps are shaped like animals that have a personality similar to the character. The Portraits collection overlapped with the Hidden London collection released in 2018, the Potions & Remedies apothecary collection released in 2023, and the British Tales collection to which they appointed existing fragrances and added new ones.

In 2024, Penhaligon's received a new appointment of their royal warrant when Charles III] became king. As of 2026, Puig's fragrances are manufactured in Chartres, France, and Alcalá de Henares, Spain.

== Marketing ==
Under modern ownership, Penhaligon's brings together many companies to craft and execute their marketing efforts.

=== Heritage brand ===
Paris store, with a worker wearing clothes similar to the British King's Guard

Penhaligon's has a longstanding tradition of trading on its Britishness, prominently displaying its royal warrants and givings many of its first fragrances names that referenced Britain.

Under current ownership, Penhaligon's creates modern reinterpretations of the brand's past. For example, with the Potions & Remedies collection, playful animations and motion graphics created by digital creative agencies like Tigrelab and KOTA imagine William Penhaligon in a fanciful laboratory, concocting fragrances to bring about cure Victorian Londoners of loneliness and unhappiness. The story is one of newly found formulas, poured into apothecary bottles.

=== Collectibility ===
Penhaligon's offered collections of fragrances in 1992 with the English Classics collection, and dramatically increased this approach in the 2000s with the Anthology Collection (2009–2011) and the Trade Routes collection (which started in 2014), under the leadership of Sarah Rotheram, who would later go on to Creed.

Collections offer customers the chance to collect, and this extends to the bottles. The Portraits collections is has bottle caps shaped by animals that represent the personalities of the fictional character for which each fragrance is named. This packaging and supporting artwork is designed by Icelandic artist Kristjana Williams and made by cosmetic packaging company TNT Group of gold electroplated zamak.

=== Entry-level luxury ===
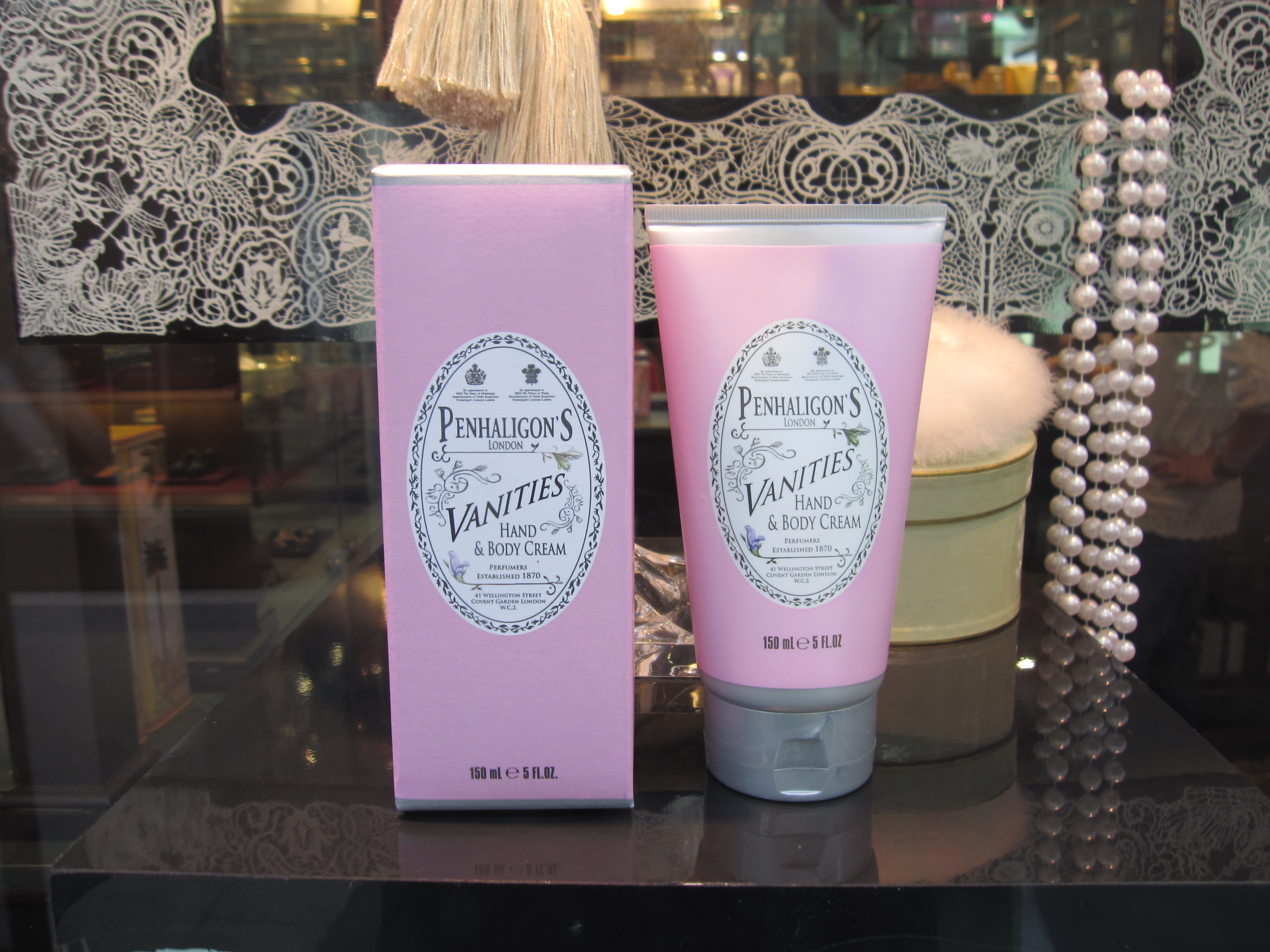
Scented lotions

Penhaligon's sells lower-priced items as a way to bring in new shoppers and funnel them toward more expensive items. Starting in 1987, they did this with scented gift books and other stationery books, candles, soaps, and potpourri.

The current owner, Puig, calls this "recruiting & gifting", and in a 2026 presentation identified Penhaligon's €20 hand creams as an example recruiting item, a €40 candle as a gifting item, and personal fragrances only in the next tiers (loyalty & profitability, and image & branding).

=== Narrative world-building ===
With the Portraits collection, the marketing focuses on a fictional aristocratic family and their relationships, scandals, and personalities. This marketing campaign has extended into immersive exhibitions and experiential events to attract younger customers. In a 2026 interview, Penhaligon's global general manager explained that the storylines of the fictional characters let the brand promote both their British heritage with eccentricity, with stories that reach people both online and in physical spaces.

The Trade Routes collection was first marketed as scents inspired by 19th century shipping trade in London and now the marketing story also references fictional global journeys made in that 19th century London to source exotic imported ingredients.

=== Retail architecture ===
Shop in Hong Kong with William's Green walls

The Covent Garden location designed by Michael Peters's firm in the 1970s had a burgundy exterior with brass accents. Inside were heavy, dark wood shelves with floral print textiles, and silvery mirrored surfaces. Other retail spaces shared similar elements of this Victorian shop and apothecary aesthetic, such as Victoria's Secret, Laura Ashley, Crabtree & Evelyn, and Caswell-Massey, and it was later pushed into entire shopping centers such as the heritage restoration of Victoria Leeds. The marketing behind the retail Victoriana aesthetic romanticized Englishness and positioned the English shop as one of gentle refinement.

More recently, the architecture has shifted from an imagined Victoriana to an idealized global Beaux Arts crafted by design firm Michaelis Boyd. Retail counters are designed around their "Oud de Nil" color palette which is named after their 2016 fragrance that's centered on an olive gray color they named William's Green, with store walls covered in tadelakt tinted that color by Clayworks and warmth from lighter-wood cabinetry, sustainable materials, and lighting designed by Joe Armitage.

== Stores ==
Besides the flagship store in Covent Garden, locations in London include the Burlington Arcade, Canary Wharf, Battersea Power Station, Regent Street, Mayfair, Kings Road, Islington, the Royal Exchange, and a second Covent Garden store has opened. A store is also located within Bicester Village.

Other shops have also been established outside of the capital in Glasgow, Edinburgh, Cardiff, Manchester, Cambridge, Bath, Brighton, Bluewater, Guildford, Leeds, Liverpool, York, Liverpool, Portsmouth and Chester, as well as internationally in Paris, New York City, Hong Kong, Canada, Ireland, San Francisco, Singapore, Sydney, United Arab Emirates, Saudi Arabia, Taiwan and Macau.

== Fragrances ==
The following table lists the company's fragrances, some of which have been discontinued and others that have been reissued at various times.

Year	Fragrance	Reissues	Perfumer	Notes
1870	Eau de Verveine	1949, 1992, 1999, and 2009		In the English Classics and Anthology collections.
1870	Eau Sans Pareil	1988, 1992, and 2011	Beverley Bayne (2011 release)	In the English Classics and Anthology collections.
1870	Esprit de Lavande (also Esprit de Lavendes)	1976 and 1992		In the English Classics collection.
1870	Esprit du Roi (also Esprit de Roi)	1976, 1983, 1992, and 2011	Bertrand Duchaufour (2011 release)	In the English Classics and Anthology collections.
1870	Extract of Limes (also Extrait of Limes)	1963, 1992, and 2009		In the English Classics and Anthology collections.
1872	Hammam Bouquet		William Penhaligon	In the British Tales collection.
1890	English Fern	2025	William Penhaligon	Brought back as a limited release as part of the 155 Limited-Edition Archive capsule.
1891 (estimated)	Patrician Essence			
1891 (estimated)	Maréchal			
1891 (estimated)	Cornubian Bouquet			
1891	Brise de Violette			
1891	Wallflower			
1891	White Lilac			
1891	Zizonia	1930, 2001, and 2010	Christian Provenzano (2010 release)	In the Anthology collection. Brought back as a limited release as part of the 155 Limited-Edition Archive capsule.
1902	Blenheim Bouquet	1981	William Penhaligon	Commissioned by Charles Spencer-Churchill, 9th Duke of Marlborough and named after Blenheim Palace; this was William Penhaligon's last creation before his death. In the British Tales collection as part of the Royally Inspired chapter.
1910	Elisabethan Rose	1984		Scent added to the Love: A Treasury of Verse and Prose (1988) and The Sweet Scented Rose: A Treasury of Verse and Prose (1994) books. In the British Tales collection as part of the English Garden chapter.
1910	Cornubia	1991 modern reinterpretation		
1911	Douro Eau de Portugal	1985, 2004, and 2009	Michael Pickthall (2004 release)	Commissioned for Percy Croft (1872–1935), of the Croft Port wine house, and named after the Douro Valley in Portugal; renamed Lords when Penhaligon's began selling it to the public in 1985; the name was reverted back again in 2004 and 2009 rebranding. Scent added to The Grand Tour (1991) book.
1927	Eau de Cologne	1992 and 2010		In the English Classics collection.
1976	Gardenia	2009		Scent added to The Fragrant Garden: Penhaligon's Scented Treasury of Verse and Prose (1992) book. In the Anthology collection
1976	Lily of the Valley		Michael Pickthall	Scent added to the Mother and Child (1993) book
1976	Primrose			
1976	Night Scented Stock	2009		In the Anthology collection
1976	Orange Blossom	2010	Bertrand Duchaufour (2010 release)	Scent added to the Bridal Bouquet: Penhaligon's Scented Treasury of Verse and Prose (1991) book. In the Anthology collection, and in the British Tales collection as part of the English Garden chapter.
1976	Violetta	2025		Scent added to The Language of Flowers (1990) book. Brought back as a limited release as part of the 155 Limited-Edition Archive capsule.
1977	Jubilee Bouquet	2010		Originally launched for the Silver Jubilee of Elizabeth II. In the Anthology collection
1977	Ormolu	1994; limited edition bottle in 2002 for the Golden Jubilee of Elizabeth II		
1978	Bluebell		Michael Pickthall	Scent added to The Language of Wild Flowers (1995) book. In the British Tales collection as part of the English Garden chapter.
1979	Victorian Posy			Created for the 1979 The Garden exhibition at the Victoria and Albert Museum. Scent added to the A Victorian Posy (1987) book.
1989	Racquets Formula		Francis Pickthall	
1996	Quercus		Christian Provenzano	In the British Tales collection as part of the English Garden chapter.
1998	Castile		Olivier Cresp	In the British Tales collection.
1998	LP No. 9 (also Love Potion No. 9)		Christian Provenzano	Originally released as a Valentine's Day limited edition and named after the 1959 song, but added to their main fragrance lines due to popularity.
1998	Neroli			
1999	LP No. 9 for Men (also Love Potion No. 9 for Men)		Christian Provenzano	
2002	Artemisia			Nominated for a FiFi award in the Nouveau Niche category in 2002. In the British Tales collection as part of the Myths and Legends chapter.
2002	Lavandula	2025		Brought back as a limited release as part of the 155 Limited-Edition Archive capsule.
2003	Endymion			In the British Tales collection as part of the Myths and Legends chapter
2003	Malabah			
2005	Ellenisia		Steve DeMercado	
2005	Opus 1870			Named for the year the company was founded
2006	Lily & Spice		Mathilde Bijaoui	
2008	Elixir		Olivia Giacobetti	
2009	Amaranthine		Bertrand Duchaufour	
2010	Sartorial		Bertrand Duchaufour	In the British Tales collection as part of the Brilliantly British chapter, and in The Gents collection.
2011	Juniper Sling		Olivier Cresp	In the British Tales collection as part of the Brilliantly British chapter.
2012	Peoneve		Olivier Cresp	
2013	Vaara		Bertrand Duchaufour	Commissioned by Maharaja Gaj Singh II to commemorate the birth of his granddaughter Vaara.
2013	Iris Prima		Alberto Morillas	Created in collaboration with the English National Ballet.
2014	Bayolea	2025		A reformulation of a 1978 bay rum hair tonic in their archives. Brought back as a limited release as part of the 155 Limited-Edition Archive capsule.
2014	Empressa		Mike Parrott	In the Trade Routes collection
2014	Levantium		Christian Provenzano	In the Trade Routes collection
2014	Lothair		Bertrand Duchaufour	In the British Tales collection.
2014	Tralala		Bertrand Duchaufour	
2015	As Sawira		Christian Provenzano	In the Trade Routes collection
2015	Blasted Heath			
2015	Blasted Bloom			
2015	Halfeti		Christian Provenzano	In the Trade Routes collection
2015	Ninevah			
2015	No. 33 Eau de Cologne			Named after one of their historic locations at 33 St. James's Street. In the Anthology collection.
2015	Ostara		Bertrand Duchaufour	
2016	Alizarin		Christian Provenzano	In the Trade Routes collection
2016	Equinox Bloom		Olivier Cresp	
2016	Luna			In the British Tales collection as part of the Myths and Legends chapter
2016	Much Ado About The Duke		Daphné Bugey	In the Portraits collection, Chapter 1, the core family
2016	Oud de Nil		Christian Provenzano	In the Trade Routes collection
2016	Roaring Radcliff		Daphné Bugey	In the Portraits collection, Chapter 2, secret affairs
2016	The Coveted Duchess Rose		Christophe Raynaud	In the Portraits collection, Chapter 1, the core family
2016	The Revenge Of Lady Blanche		Daphné Bugey	In the Portraits collection, Chapter 1, the core family
2016	The Tragedy of Lord George		Alberto Morillas	In the Portraits collection, Chapter 1, the core family
2017	Agarbathi		Alex Lee	In the Trade Routes collection
2017	Agarwood		Christian Provenzano	
2017	Clandestine Clara			In the Portraits collection, Chapter 2, secret affairs
2017	Mr Harrod		Loc Dong	In the Portraits collection, Chapter 3, extended family and overseas guests. Sold exclusively at Harrods.
2017	Monsieur Beauregard			In the Portraits collection, Chapter 3, extended family and overseas guests
2017	Paithani		Alex Lee	In the Trade Routes collection
2017	Savoy Steam		Juliette Karagueuzoglou	In the British Tales collection.
2017	The Bewitching Yasmine			In the Portraits collection, Chapter 3, extended family and overseas guests
2017	The Ruthless Countess Dorothea			In the Portraits collection, Chapter 3, extended family and overseas guests
2017	The Uncompromising Sohan			In the Portraits collection, Chapter 3, extended family and overseas guests
2018	Belgravia Chypre		Fabrice Pellegrin	In the Hidden London limited edition collection
2018	Changing Constance			In the Portraits collection, Chapter 4, society scandals and cousins
2018	Kensington Amber		Fabrice Pellegrin	In the Hidden London limited edition collection
2018	Marylebone Wood		Fabrice Pellegrin	In the Hidden London limited edition collection
2018	The Blazing Mister Sam			In the Portraits collection, Chapter 4, society scandals and cousins
2019	Babylon			In the Trade Routes collection
2019	Cairo		Christophe Raynaud	In the Trade Routes collection
2019	Heartless Helen			In the Portraits collection, Chapter 4, society scandals and cousins
2019	Terrible Teddy			In the Portraits collection, Chapter 4, society scandals and cousins
2019	The Impudent Cousin Matthew			In the Portraits collection, Chapter 4, society scandals and cousins
2019	The Ingénue Cousin Flora			In the Portraits collection, Chapter 4, society scandals and cousins
2020	Brilliantly British			Limited edition commemorating their 150th anniversary, sold exclusively at Heathrow Airport
2020	Halfeti Cedar		Christian Provenzano	In the Trade Routes collection
2020	Halfeti Leather		Christian Provenzano	In the Trade Routes collection
2020	The Favourite		Aliénor Massenet	In the British Tales collection as part of the Royally Inspired chapter.
2020	The Inimitable William Penhaligon		Alberto Morillas	In the Portraits collection
2021	Constantinople		Christophe Raynaud and Marie Salamagne	In the Trade Routes collection
2021	Racquets			A modern reinterpretation of Racquets Formula (1989)
2021	The World According to Arthur			In the Portraits collection
2022	Highgrove Bouquet		Julie Pluchet	A limited edition created to support The King's Foundation. In the British Tales collection.
2022	Legacy of Petra		Nathalie Gracia-Cetto	In the Trade Routes collection
2022	Sports Car Club			In the British Tales collection as part of the Brilliantly British chapter, and in The Gents collection.
2023	Eau de Audacity		Dominuque Ropion	In the Potions & Remedies apothecary collection
2023	Liquid Love		Nicolas Beaulieu	In the Potions & Remedies apothecary collection
2023	Vra Vra Vroom		Quentin Bisch	In the Potions & Remedies apothecary collection
2023	Solaris		Aliénor Massenet	In the British Tales collection as part of the Myths and Legends chapter
2023	The Omniscient Mr Thompson			In the Portraits collection
2023	A Balm of Calm			In the Potions & Remedies apothecary collection
2023	A Kiss of Bliss			In the Potions & Remedies apothecary collection
2024	AlUla		Fanny Bal	In the Trade Routes collection
2024	The Dandy		Fabrice Pellegrin	In the British Tales collection as part of the Brilliantly British chapter, and in The Gents collection.
2025	Daphne Bouquet		Antoine Maisondieu	A limited edition created to support The King's Foundation. In the British Tales collection as part of the Royally Inspired chapter.
2025	Fortuitous Finley		Caroline Dumur	In the Portraits collection
2025	The Cut		Paul Guerlain	In the British Tales collection as part of the Brilliantly British chapter, and in The Gents collection.
2026	Bold Blend		Paul Guerlain	In the Potions & Remedies apothecary collection
2026	Halfeti Amber			In the Trade Routes collection
2026	The Manoeuvres of the Baroness		Daphne Bugey	In the Portraits collection
