= Givenchy Pour Homme =

Men's perfume by Givenchy

Givenchy Pour Homme is a men's perfume produced by French fashion house Givenchy, introduced in 2002. Its perfumers were Alberto Morillas and Ilias Ermenidis.
