= Irina Kulikova =

Irina Kulikova may refer to:

- Irina Kulikova (model)
- Irina Kulikova (guitarist)
