= Lendrum & Hartman =

London automobile importer

Lendrum & Hartman Ltd was a major London importer, the sole UK concessionaires of Buick and Cadillac cars from North America between 1919 and 1968. It became the most prestigious car dealership in the country, having sold a Buick in 1935 to the Prince of Wales, who became King Edward VIII the following year.

== History ==
Ernest Lendrum, a self-made successful businessman and Frederick Hartman, son of a wealthy Anglo-German industrialist, partner in Suter Hartmann, now a stockbroker invalided out of the Royal Naval Air Service met in 1917 at a City of London function, struck up a friendship realising a mutual interest in motor cars. They recognised the sales opportunities there would be after the First World War, particularly American cars, as the whole of British industry had been devoted to the war effort.
In May 1919 they travelled to New York to secure a deal with General Motors. Their initiative was successful. General Motors had already established itself in London at Long Acre but met with variable success over the years. The persuasive businessmen had secured a deal as non-franchised importers of top General Motors brands, Buick and Cadillac. In October Ernest registered the new company Lendrum Motors Ltd, using the address of Hartman's London flat at 26b Albemarle Street, London W 1.

=== 1920s–1930s ===
In 1920, they acquired the General Motors old premises in Long Acre, and in 1921 moved to a better location in Mayfair, the recently vacated ground floor and basement premises of The Mellier building at 26b Albemarle Street. They renamed it ‘Buick House’. It would be the Lendrum & Hartman Mayfair showrooms for the next thirty years. The following year General Motors announced they were seeking to appoint another agent in London. Hartman again travelled to New York, and after a series of meetings at the General Motors Building (Manhattan) on Broadway won the business. With the result Ernest Lendrum made Hartman a full partner in January 1923 creating Lendrum & Hartman Ltd. By 1927 the Society of Motor Manufacturers and Traders announced that it had achieved 27,949 – the highest number of US imported cars to the UK. Confident that the business was developing well in the hands of Hartman, Lendrum took on the role of silent partner and resigned in 1931. The following year the company became Buick, Cadillac, and La Salle Concessionaires. The number of cars sold in 1932 was 150, by 1938 it would reach 2,000; the upper classes were now considering American cars as a credible alternative to Rolls-Royce, Bentley and Daimler
The 1920s and 1930s was a period of rapid growth for Lendrum & Hartman. Captain Hartman, (using his assumed war-time rank) was a consummate salesman and went out of his way to cultivate American executives like James D. Mooney, president of General Motors Overseas, and General Motors president Alfred P. Sloan. Hartman used the 1924 British Empire Exhibition at Wembley Park, officially opened by H.M. King George V, for social and business networking. General Motors of Canada Limited took the largest space in the Canadian Pavilion receiving a visit from the Prince of Wales. It was the largest exhibition ever staged anywhere in the world and had attracted twenty-seven million visitors.
By the early 1930s, the Buick brand in the UK had generally become accepted as representing one of the finest examples of transatlantic design in the field of medium-priced cars. The models exported to the UK came from Canada and were badged as McLaughlin Buicks for the British market and classified as being Empire-built.
In the summer of 1934, Lendrum and Hartman Limited was completely reorganised, with an increased share capital, and a new director was appointed, Hartman's wife (the former Lady Dalrymple), Mrs. Dorothea Mirabelle Cynthia Hartman.

=== Post war ===
Ernest Lendrum died in 1938 aged 61, at his home, Moor Place, Pinkneys Green, near Maidenhead Berkshire. Four years later in 1942, ‘Captain’ Hartman died aged 58 at his home, Luckington Manor, Wiltshire. His wife, Dorothy Hartman (the former Lady Dalrymple) inherited the business and ran it successfully in the post-war years. It was announced at the 1952 Motor Show, Another woman in the motoring news is Mrs Dorothy Hartman, head of a firm which distributes some leading American cars in Britain, who will be the only woman exhibitor at the Motor Show. To-night she gives a party to introduce a ‘Golden Anniversary’ Cadillac.. She moved to Stumblehole Farm in Surrey in 1953, continued running the company from her flat in Berkeley House in Hay Hill, until her death in November 1957.

The company was bequeathed to a close family friend Guy Nicholas (Nick) Vansittart, then chairman of Vauxhall Motors. Nick sold it to the Lex Group in the early 1960s. Around that time Lex had bought the US franchise for Chevrolet and Oldsmobile by the acquisition of British and Colonial Motors in St Martins Lane. The Lendrum & Hartman concessions of Buick and Cadillac fitted well into their strategic plans.

By 1966 the Albemarle Street showroom closed, and Lendrum & Hartman relocated to Flood Street in Chelsea, near the Kings Road. Under the ownership during the 1960s, the dealership became known for selling American vehicles to figures in the entertainment industry, including film and television actors and pop musicians, During this period, American cars were increasingly viewed as status symbols by the demographic, often favored over traditional British marques such as Rover (marque) or Armstrong Siddeley.

The 1980s were not so kind and unfavourable legislation introduced earlier finally led to the company being dissolved and put into receivership in September 1990. The Lex Group was acquired by Aviva, a British multinational insurance company in 2005.

== Company and directors ==
Lendrum & Hartman Ltd. Automobile Distributors, Importers and Repairers.
Company registered office: Berkeley House, Hay Hill, London W1 (Mrs Hartman's flat)
Showrooms: Buick House, 26b, Albemarle Street, London, W.I. Telephone: Regent 7121. T/A:"Buickgen" London
Vehicle Service: Buick Works, Old Oak Lane, Willesden Junction, London, N.W.10. Telephone: Elgar 7911. T/A: "Exbuickmo" London
Directors: Dorothy C. M. Hartman, Charles H. Culross, Rowley M. Rowley-Morris, Henry E. Berenstein (general manager and advertising executive),
Sales executive: E. T. Cuthbert, service executives: R. Johns (production), E. Taylor, secretary: John Sheehan.

DIRECTOR NOTES:

- Henry Berenstein (1895–1970), joined L&H in 1922 had been a friend of Hartmam since their days in the RNAS during WW1.
- Rowley-Morris (1875–1954), a confirmed bachelor, distantly related through marriage to actor Charles Dance, was also a member of the RAC, and Hartman's banker at Lloyds Bank (Cox and King's branch), later joined the L&H board after Captain Hartman's death.
- Charles Culross (1881–1960), had been Hartman's close friend and solicitor (Charles Culross & Co.) since 1918.

== Mayfair showroom ==
Albemarle Street, one of the most fashionable streets in Mayfair with many historic associations. Lord Byron, whose publisher John Murray was based at number 50, Oscar Wilde, a member of the Albemarle Club at number 13, the Rev. William Webb Ellis, the Anglican clergyman who invented rugby football, preached at St George's Chapel at number 27, demolished around 1903, and Anne Lister, Gentleman Jack a notable Victorian lesbian, stayed at number 29.

Lendrum Motors moved to Mayfair in 1921, taking the recently vacated ground floor and basement premises of The Mellier building at 26b Albemarle Street, opposite the Royal Institution at number 21. This fashionable and stylish showroom in the Beaux-Arts building was known originally as The Mellier, once the home and showroom of Charles Mellier & Co. Mellier was born in France and became a successful high quality cabinet maker and decorator, one of his most famous commissions had been for the liner, RMS Mauretania (1906). They renamed it ‘Buick House’ and from 1923 it remained the Lendrum & Hartman Mayfair showrooms for the next thirty years.

The showroom was closed in 1966, after the company was sold to the Lex Group, moving to Flood Street, off Kings Road, Chelsea, S.W.3. Today the Albemarle Street building renamed The Mellier again, has been transformed by architect Eric Parry from commercial use into apartments with spectacular penthouse.

== Willesden works - Old Oak Lane ==
In 1921, the company took a new lease on the facilities at Old Oak Lane in Willesden N.W.10, originally the Bedford Motors assembly plant, which became the ‘Buick Works’ for servicing and maintenance. It backed onto the Grand Union Canal.

From the very early days Lendrum & Hartman had specialised bodies built on Buick chassis. In the 1920s, the most popular were two-seater coupes with dickey seats, built by Page & Hunt of Farnborough, Surrey. It was one of these that the artist Augustus John had acquired in exchange for a picture. The limousines version was usually by Vanden Plas of Brussels. The chassis were shipped from the London docks and they returned finished to Harwich, several at a time, escorted by the Lendrum & Hartman Belgium representative.

Hartman recruited well, his choice of Merle Gates Armstrong from Noyes Buick in Boston in 1924, to run the London servicing operation, proved a success, assisted by Ted Taylor, his under-manager, who had previously been employed by General Motors, and a popular Canadian, Bob Berryman, headed the Reception Department. Hartman had initiated a new-car delivery service and Berryman's team was instructed to show anyone interested over the Buick Service Department without prior appointment, all innovative business practices at the time. By 1929 the Old Oak Lane in Willesden the service depot for Buick, Cadillac and La Salle cars was now covering 114,000-square-foot and employing over two-hundred personnel, with a wide range of skills on the premises. These included blacksmiths, welders, trimmers and upholsterers, machine shops, paint shops and a spare-parts department. This coordinated approach was a very unusual and advanced for the 1920s. By the 1930s the facility was handling over 12,000 cars a year.

When war was declared in 1939, the Old Oak Lane service complex was given over to military repairs. Just after the Dunkirk evacuations in 1940 Captain Hartman had seized the publicity opportunity of presenting General Charles de Gaulle with a Buick limousine on his arrival in England. Amongst the clients during the war included, Admiral Sir Max Horton VC, commander in chief Western Approaches, Exiled King Peter II of Yugoslavia, his mother Queen Maria of Yugoslavia, also purchased a L&H Buick, Queen Wilhelmina of the Netherlands, Władysław Sikorski, prime minister of the Polish Government in Exile, and the Russian ambassador, Ivan Maisky. With the arrival of the first American Forces in January 1942 the works were instructed to prepare a bullet-proof Cadillac for the use of General Dwight D. Eisenhower. This was done, using armour plate inside the doors, flooring, roof, as well as special Triplex glass and Dunlop tyres.

After the sale of Lendrum & Hartman in the 1960s the Old Oak Lane service depot, was closed and the spares and service was undertaken by the Lex Group at Kensington Place, Campden Hill Road, London N.W.8.

== Royal connection ==
Edward, Prince of Wales had visited Canada in 1927, and used a lavishly outfitted McLaughlin Buick, McLaughlin Motor Car Company that appears to have sparked his affection for the company's products.

In the summer of 1935, the Prince of Wales arrived unannounced at the Albemarle Street showrooms of Lendrum & Hartman and ordered a customized McLaughlin Buick, that would give two passengers luxury and privacy, specifications to include drinks cabinets, vanity mirrors, reading lights, correspondence facilities, radio, smoker's cabinet, jewellery cabinet, compartments for canteen and luncheon trays, and a drawer to accommodate London telephone directories.

Captain Hartman was called from a local hairdresser Truefitt & Hill in Bond Street, to personally attend to his Royal client. The works manager, Ted Taylor, was sent to visit the Prince at York House, St James's Palace to take instructions on the requirements of the client. Taylor was then sent to General Motors Canada, at Oshawa, in Ontario, to supervise the building of two cars ordered, one the main car, the other a back-up. The choice of these Buicks was said to have been made by Wallis Simpson. The car was delivered to the King at St James's Palace in February the following year. Fred Kirk who worked for Lendrum & Hartman was seconded to King Edward VIII as his private chauffeur when the King bought these customised Buicks. He drove Edward and Mrs Simpson throughout 1936 including the last visit to Windsor Castle to make his abdication speech. He accompanied the king to France in December 1936 before his exile in Paris.

The car with registration CUL 421, was sold at auction by Bonhams in London for more than £100,000 in 2007. It had clocked up 42,827 miles, and included many original fittings, including two silver gilt cigarette boxes, a silver jewellery box, six silver top decanters and two posy holders. It is said that the Foreign Office chose the number plate when the abdicated Edward went to France as in French the word "CUL" is slang for "arse". The documents include the original logbook, stating the first owner to be H.M. The King, St James's Palace, SW1, and an album of photographs of the car to the point when it was handed over to the King.

== Distinguished customers ==
Lendrum & Hartman, under Captain Hartman's direction, had become ‘the’ car dealership in England, boosted enormously by royal association.

By the early 1930s the Buick brand in the UK had generally become accepted as representing one of the finest examples of transatlantic design in the field of medium-priced cars. The models exported to the UK came from Canada and were badged as McLaughlin Buicks for the British market and classified as being Empire-built. Buick cars became the ‘must haves’ for leading business people, as well as theatricals and celebrities. Apart from the King Edward VIII (Duke of Windsor) and his American socialite friend Mrs Wallis Simpson, customers included:

- Lady Patricia Ramsay, Princess Patricia of Connaught granddaughter of Queen Victoria, was over six-foot, so had the body built especially high in order that she could enter and alight gracefully
- Prince George, Duke of Kent
- Thomas Edward Anson, fourth Earl of Lichfield
- Lady Brownlow, wife of Peregrine Cust, 6th Baron Brownlow, closely linked with Wallis Simpson's circle (out of royal favour after the abdication)
- The Honourable Mrs Charles Greville, wife of Charles Greville, 3rd Baron Greville a British society hostess and philanthropist
- Henry Somerset, 10th Duke of Beaufort and Master of The Beaufort Hunt in Badminton
- Henry Pelham-Clinton-Hope, 9th Duke of Newcastle styled Earl of Lincoln from 1928 to 1941, was a British peer and aviator
- Sir David Dalrymple, Dorothy Hartman's ex second husband, was sold a Buick Sports Roadster
- Henry Gage, 6th Viscount Gage, landowner and chairman of Southdown Hunt in Sussex
- Sir Ernest Guinness, bought a custom-built V16 Cadillac, exhibited at London Motor Show in 1930 before delivery
- Augustus John, Welsh painter
- Lucy, Lady Houston, British philanthropist, political activist and suffragette
- Denis Sebastian Pietro Ziani De Ferranti, a member of the family electrical engineering and equipment firm
- Gracie Fields, actress, singer and comedienne
- George Formby, actor, singer-songwriter and comedian
- Firth Shephard, a London theatrical impresario
- Diana Dors, English film actress and singer
- Raymond Bessone, known as Mr Teasy-Weasy, Britain's first celebrity hairdresser in the post war years (he trained Vidal Sassoon)
- Jack Hylton, Jack Payne (bandleader) and Edmundo Ros, leading dance band leaders
- Sir John Moores (British businessman) and philanthropist who founded Littlewoods retail company
- Barbara Hutton, an American socialite, heiress and philanthropist, during her brief stay at the Savoy in London
- Whitney Straight, Grand Prix motor racing driver, a distinguished air commodore and deputy chairman of British Overseas Airways Corporation (BOAC)
- Sir Giles Gilbert Scott, architect of Liverpool Cathedral, Waterloo Bridge, Battersea Power Station, and the iconic red telephone box
- Sir Jack Cohen (businessman), a grocer who founded the Tesco supermarket chain
- the Cartier (jeweler) family of Bond Street, Royal Warrant holder since 1921
- Sir John Ellerman, 1st Baronet, English ship-owner, once considered one of the wealthiest men in England
- Admiral Sir Max Horton VC, who was commander in chief Western Approaches
- Ian Fleming, author and journalist, who as a young man working for Reuters was a L&H Buick sports car fan

== ‘Concours d'Elégance’ ==
During the 1930s, Captain Hartman would ‘showcase’ his company cars by entering many of his personal Cadillacs in various Concours d'Elegance events at home and abroad where he won many premier awards. These cars were serviced and maintained by his works at Old Oak Lane, in Willesden. These events, essentially ‘beauty contests’ for automobiles flourished in Europe, particularly France during the interwar period, emerging in 1920s Paris in the Bois de Boulogne and resort cities like Le Touquet in the north and on the Riviera, and continued until the onset of the war. Organized by French newspapers L'Auto-Journal and L'Intransigeant and the journal Fémina, (Lady Diana Cooper once briefly edited the English edition in the twenties) the idea in the early days was to mix models in haute couture with a parade of various elegant cars, later actresses and celebrities took part. It continues as the Annual European Concours d’Elegance.

== London Motor Shows ==
The first British Motor Show organised by the Society of Motor Manufacturers and Traders (SMMT) was held at Crystal Palace, London in 1903, the same year that the speed limit was raised from 14 miles per hour to 20 miles per hour by the Motor Car Act 1903. After the 1903 event it moved to Olympia in London, where it was held for the next 32 years before moving to Earl's Court Exhibition Centre, London from 1937 until 1976, except for the period of World War II during which time where were no shows.

The London Motor Show in 1955 took place at Earls Court in October. The same year General Motors announced from its Lendrum & Hartman stand, it had been the best year for Buick sales ever, with over 738,800 sold. One of the star exhibits was a display model of the Cadillac ‘La Espada’ -the only one built for exhibition purposes, a completely functional dream car built of fiberglass and gave promises of things to come, there was no price tag, but it was insured for thirty-five thousand dollars.

A selection of Lendrum & Hartman exhibition catalogue covers including: 1936, 1948, 1951, 1956, and 1957 are featured in Graces Guide

== Creative Advertising ==
Hartman was a salesman with a love of cars. He was a member of the Royal Automobile Club in Pall Mall, with its breathtaking Rotunda, used for displaying vintage cars.

- One of his early advertising stunts during the 1920s included a couple dancing the Charleston on the roof of a Buick saloon while it was being driven in London's Kingsway. (An original film clip of this event is used to introduce the P. G. Wodehouse BBC TV comedy series. The World of Wooster 1965–67).
- Another, to prove the durability of an L&H Buick, was driven up a long flight of stairs in the grounds of the Crystal Palace.

== Film associations ==
- 1920s, Huntley Film Archives John Huntley (film historian) Clip shows: London streets after the war (WW1). Crowds in the street. Long line of London omnibuses, many people. Well-dressed people at the horse races. People on a spinning fairground ride. Traffic (in Kingsway London) with couple dancing the Charleston on the roof of a L&H Buick car. Ref: 1096286, Category: London, Decade: 1920, Sound: Mute, Colour: Film – B/W
- In 1956, Diana Dors, majestically arrived at the Cannes Film Festival in her delicate pink L&H Cadillac convertible, given to her by Shepperton Studios; to promote the film Yield to the Night, the movie was nominated for the Palme d'Or.
- In 1960, Hell Is a City a British crime thriller starring Stanley Baker, features a L&H 1938 Buick Special side mounted sedan
- In 1971, a L&H Cadillac Fleetwood is used in various scenes, including entering the Gatehouse to Dryderdale Hall, in the iconic film Get Carter featuring Michael Caine (playing Jack Carter) with Ian Hendry (playing Eric Paice -the Cadillac chauffeur)

== General Motors Continental ==
Since the 1930s, the Hartman's at Lendrum & Hartman had developed a close business and social friendship with Guy Nicholas Vansittart (1893–1989) at General Motors Continental (became General Motors Europe in 1986). He was known as Nick within the company, distantly related to T. E. Lawrence and well connected politically (his brother was Robert Vansittart, 1st Baron Vansittart). He joined General Motors Continental in 1927, and became assistant managing director in March 1929. In July of the following year, he was promoted managing director of General Motors Continental. By 1937, Vansittart had been appointed regional director (for Northern Europe) responsible for General Motors Continental, covering Europe, Scandinavia and the Balkans, based in Antwerp Belgium.
In 1938, Nick was placed in charge of the H.Q. office of General Motors Limited in St. James's Square, London. He was near neighbour to the Hartman's and Stewart Menzies in the 1940s living in the Wiltshire village of Luckington. During the war he served with Special Operations Executive (SOE).
He was elected chairman of the board of Vauxhall Motors Limited in 1948. He inherited Lendrum & Hartman on the death of Mrs Dorothy Hartman in 1957, and retired from Vauxhall the following year.

== Sources ==
- CARVERHILL, Geoff, automotive historian and author of The Lendrum & Hartman Story, in Classic American Magazine, published in three parts June–July–August 2006 Home
- DANN, John, Maud Coleno's Daughter -The life and times of Dorothy Hartman, 1898–1957, Troubador, 2017 ISBN 9781785899713
- FOURIE, Louis F, On a Global Mission: The Automobiles of General Motors International Volume 3, FriesenPress Canada, 2016
- GOODMAN, Bryan, American Cars in Prewar England: A Pictorial Survey, 2004 Mc Farland & Co Inc, N.Carolina USA
- HAYWARD, David, General Motors historian, David Hayward (1935-2015)
- JOHNS, Russell, article Buick By-Gones, life with Lendrum & Hartman featured in ‘MotorSport Magazine’ October 1980, pages 1560-1562
- SLOAN, Alfred P Jr., My Years with General Motors, Doubleday & Co., New York 1964
- STEVENSON, Heon, American Automobile Advertising, 1930-1980: An Illustrated History, 2006, Mc Farland & Co Inc, N.Carolina USA
- TURNER, Henry Ashby, General Motors and the Nazis: The Struggle for Control of Opel, Europe's Biggest Carmaker, Yale University Press, 2005
- Bonhams, 2007, Auction of King Edward VIII, 1936 L&H Buick, limited series 90 eight limousine Bonhams : Formerly the Property of His Majesty, King Edward VIII, 1936 Buick Limited Series 90 Eight Limousine Chassis no. 649990164 Engine no. 2943885
- Lendrum & Hartman, showroon premises, Albemarle Street (as it is today) Glebe - Portfolio - Albemarle Street
