= CK One =

Perfume product

CK One is a citrus aromatic chypre unisex fragrance developed by Alberto Morillas and Harry Fremont for Calvin Klein.

== Composition and marketing ==
CK One's top notes include pineapple, mandarin orange, papaya, bergamot, cardamom and lemon. Its middle notes include nutmeg, violet, orris root, jasmine, lily-of-the-valley and rose. Its base notes include sandalwood, amber, musk, cedar and oakmoss.

The fragrance is considered to be a unisex fragrance, and was the first unisex fragrance to gain wide popularity in the US. It has also been described as the first fragrance to be openly marketed as unisex.

=== CK One Essence ===
CK One Essence, a "parfum intense" version of the original scent was released in August 2024. Calvin Klein claims that CK One Essence is twice as concentrated as the original. Calvin Klein marketed the fragrance as a way to celebrate the 30th anniversary of CK One with a "signature scent for men and women, for all occasions".

== History and sales ==
CK One was launched in 1994. It became a best-seller, making more than $5 million in its first 10 days. It generated about $90 million (USD) annually in the mid-1990s. As of 2007, the scent's sales in the United States were still about $30 million annually.
