= General Motors Europe =

Europe's division of General Motors

- Type: Subsidiary
- Industry: Automotive
- Founded: April 4, 1986
- Defunct: 2017; 9 years ago
- Fate: Sold to PSA Group in 2017
- Successor: PSA Group
- Headquarters: Zurich, Switzerland
- Number of locations: 14 manufacturing facilities in nine countries
- Area served: Europe
- Key people: Nick Reilly, Former CEO
- Products: Automobiles; Commercial vehicles
- Brands: Opel; Vauxhall; Saab (until 2010)
- Services: Vehicle financing; Vehicle insurance
- Number of employees: 54,500 (2009)
- Parent: General Motors

General Motors Europe (often abbreviated to GM Europe) was the European subsidiary of the American automaker General Motors (GM). The subsidiary was established by GM in 1986 and operated 14 production and assembly facilities in 9 countries, and employed around 54,500 people. GM's core European brands were Vauxhall and Opel, which both sell much the same range of cars in different markets. GM also owned the Swedish brand Saab until early 2010 and sold Chevrolet models between 2005 and 2015. The U.S. brand Cadillac is imported into Europe in small quantities. In 2009, General Motors (GM) announced to move its European headquarters from Zürich, Switzerland, to Rüsselsheim, Germany, to strengthen its German subsidiary Opel.

As of July 2022, General Motors's European operations are conducted by Cadillac Europe GmbH (distribution of Cadillac vehicles and Chevrolet sports cars), General Motors IT Services (Ireland) Limited in Ireland (provision of IT services) and GM Auto LLC (ООО Джи Эм Авто) (a separate subsidiary that distributes the Chevrolet Camaro, Tahoe, and Traverse models in Russia).

== Overview ==
In Europe, GM Europe operated 14 vehicle production and assembly facilities in nine countries and employed around 54,500* people. Many additional directly related jobs were provided by some 8,700 independent sales and service outlets. In 2005 GM's market share in Europe was 9.4%.

=== European factories ===
- Germany (Opel): Bochum, Eisenach, Kaiserslautern and Rüsselsheim, employed 25,103 workers.
- Spain (Opel): Figueruelas, Zaragoza, employed 7,001 workers (the biggest factory of General Motors in Europe).
- England (Vauxhall): Ellesmere Port and Luton, employed 4,279 workers.
- Sweden (Saab): Trollhättan, employed 3,892 workers.
- Hungary (Opel): Szentgotthárd.
- Poland (Opel): Gliwice, employed 3,582 workers.
- Belgium (Opel): Antwerp, employed 2,584 workers.
- Russia (Opel): St. Petersburg, employed 986 workers (the Shushary plant was shut down in 2015 and later sold to Hyundai).

The total number of European employees were 54,500 (as of May 2009).

== History ==
=== 1911–1939 ===
General Motors entered the European market only three years after the company's foundation in 1908. This involved the construction of Chevrolet cars in Denmark in 1923 and Belgium in 1925. This involvement was greatly expanded by the acquisitions of Vauxhall in 1925 and Opel in 1929. Originally both Vauxhall and Opel had operated independently of each other with totally separate product lines and were direct competitors outside of each other's home markets.

See also David Hayward's Automotive history: GENERAL MOTORS 1908 TO 1933 Outlines in detail the company's development, acquisitions, key directors, particularly Guy Nicholas (Nick) Vansittart (1893–1989) see Lendrum & Hartman and James D. Mooney (1884–1957) involvement with Adam Opel A.G. and politics between the wars.

=== 1970–2008 ===
By the early 1970s, GM began to merge the product lines of Opel and Vauxhall, with the development of a series of common platforms from which a range of vehicles could be derived. These vehicles carried either Vauxhall or Opel branding depending on market – Vauxhall being mainly used in the British market, Opel everywhere else. This in turn allowed manufacturing resources to be pooled, therefore Opel badged vehicles were produced in Vauxhall factories and vice versa. Initially under this arrangement, Vauxhall still retained some degree of design and engineering freedom with their versions of the Opel models carrying their own distinct front and rear styling, and in some cases, their own engine designs; but by the launch of the Opel Kadett D in 1979, the cars only differed in badging and specification. This therefore meant that two ranges of otherwise identical cars were sold in competition with each other under the two brands, this ended in 1982 when both dealer networks were merged as "Vauxhall-Opel", most of the Opel range was discontinued in favour of their Vauxhall equivalents and Opel was positioned in Great Britain as a performance-luxury brand, with only the Manta, Senator and Monza ranges being offered in Great Britain. Elsewhere in Europe, Vauxhall's Bedford brand was used on car-derived vans and heavy commercial vehicles. Vauxhall-badged cars were sold across Europe in small numbers, even in Opel's home market Germany, and remained the longest in Scandinavia and the Benelux countries – markets that did not have their own automobile industry and also retained a residual resistance to German goods following World War II.

General Motors' American-made cars were sold sporadically in Europe in the 1970s and into the early 1980s. One main import centre was Lendrum & Hartman Limited in the United Kingdom (who had assembled GM cars in the pre-war years), but in 1982 there was a push to increase export to Europe and all American (and Canadian) imports were moved to a unified importer in Athens, Greece, called the North American Vehicle Overseas Organisation. This location was chosen as the company would also handle exports to Africa and the Middle East. The export push was a reflection of a weak dollar and the post-oil crisis move to smaller and more efficient cars, more marketable in Europe. General Motors' European spare parts depot for American parts was located in Antwerp, Belgium.

IBC Vehicles, a joint venture between GM and Isuzu was established in 1985. The new company took over the Bedford van plant in Luton, producing a range of badge engineered light vans based on Isuzu and Suzuki designs. IBC would later go on to manufacture the Isuzu-based Frontera SUV model. Isuzu would later pull out of IBC Vehicles in 1998, with Renault (and later the Renault–Nissan Alliance) taking its place in the venture – which was subsequently renamed as GMM Luton, manufacturing the Vivaro family of light cargo vans.

In 1986, GM officially inaugurated GM Europe, the same year as the last "true" Vauxhall – the Bedford CF panel van – ceased manufacture. In 1987, GM Europe sold the heavy trucks division of Bedford to AWD Ltd, the Bedford brand continued on light commercial vehicles until 1990 when it was dropped completely. The newly created AWD struggled as an independent business away from GM, and collapsed in 1992, bringing an end to the lineage of Bedford trucks and the Dunstable plant was later closed.

In 1988, following the discontinuation of the Manta model (the Senator had become a Vauxhall in 1984, while the Monza coupe was killed off in 1987), the Opel brand was formally dropped in the UK market – while Vauxhall was discontinued in Ireland in favour of Opel six years earlier. GM Europe announced in 1991 that the sixth generation Opel Kadett platform would adopt the Astra name (already used by Vauxhall) – ushering in a new policy of standardization of model names across both brands, further diluting Vauxhall's independence from Opel. In 2002, it was announced that the Vauxhall car production lines at Luton would close following the introduction of the third generation Vectra.

Also in 1986, GM bought Lotus in England – the first fruit of the purchase being the special edition Lotus Omega/Carlton performance saloon. Seven years later, on August 27, 1993, GM sold the company for £30 million to owners of Bugatti. GM acquired a 50 percent stake in Saab of Sweden in 1989, taking full ownership in 2000. General Motors also developed a partnership with and acquired a stake in Fiat in 2000. GM divested its minority equity interests and dissolved the partnership in 2005, following a legal fight regarding the conditions of a put option afforded Fiat.

=== Restructuring ===
Following the 2008 financial crisis, and GM's plunge towards bankruptcy, on May 30, 2009, it was announced that a deal had been reached to transfer New Opel (Opel plus Vauxhall, minus Saab) assets to a separate company, controlled by a trustee.

The deal, underwritten by the German Government, was negotiated by German Chancellor Angela Merkel. GM was expected to keep a 35% minority stake in the new company, Opel staff 10%, with a plan which proposed to sell the majority of the business to one of two partners:

- Fiat
- A consortium majority-owned by a Sberbank of Russia (35%), Magna International of Canada (20%), and Opel employees and car dealers (10%)

The new company would not be allowed to sell Opel cars in the US (permanently) and China (at least temporarily) markets, which are the two biggest markets in the world.

On 1 June 2009, GM filed for bankruptcy in a court in New York. As the sale of Opel has been negotiated two days before, with the preferred bidder the Magna consortia, both companies were in effect ring-fenced from any GM asset liquidation. Magna stated that their plans for Opel included attracting GM or third-party carmakers to build their cars and electric vehicles in Antwerp. If Opel needed to reduce production of its own core models then any unused capacity could be used to manufacture vehicles for other carmakers. Inside sources close to Magna revealed that some of the possible third party carmakers include the U.S carmaker Ford and the French company PSA Peugeot-Citroën (PSA). However, negotiations broke down with Magna over details, particularly the sale of intellectual property rights and distribution of all future GM products in the former Soviet Union.

GM announced that final bids were to be placed with them by July 20, which resulted in three bidders:

- Magna, still backed by Sberbank, had made a last-minute change to its bid to placate concerns about its Russian partner's influence. This would result in both partners having a 27.5% share in the new company, with GM retaining 35%
- Belgian-based investor RHJ International
- China's Beijing Automotive Industries – disqualified over "intellectual property issues" a few days later

Towards the end of August 2009 there were doubts over whether a sale of Opel would actually go ahead, though a German government official later revealed that talks were continuing. This was followed by RHJ International raising its bid for Opel to €300m from €275m.

On 10 September 2009, GM agreed to sell a 55% stake in the German brand Opel to the Magna group with the approval of the German government. With this move, Magna chairman Frank Stronach aims to take Magna from its current role as a parts supplier to an expanded role as a global automaker that ranks "amongst the leaders in selling and building electric cars." However, on November 3, 2009, the GM board called off the Magna deal after coming to the conclusion that Opel was crucial to GM's global strategy.

With ongoing restructuring plans Opel announced the closure of its Antwerp plant in Belgium.

In 2015, the Spanish National Commission on Markets and Competition fined General Motors España, S.L.U. with over 22 million euros because it operated a cartel with other car builders and sellers controlling 91% of the Spanish market between 2006 and 2013. They shared information about sales and repairs anti-competitively.

==== Sale of Saab to Spyker ====
Originally GM planned to sell Saab to Swedish sportscar maker Koenigsegg.

On 11 June 2009, a letter of intent was signed by GM to sell Saab to Koenigsegg, but the deal fell through in November 2009. On 26 January 2010, Saab was sold to Spyker Cars, forming a company known as Swedish Automobile.

==== Sale of Opel and Vauxhall to PSA ====
On 6 March 2017, GM and PSA Group announced an agreement for PSA to buy GM's Vauxhall and Opel subsidiaries in a deal worth US$2.2 billion. PSA would later merge with Fiat Chrysler Automobiles to form Stellantis in 2021.
