= Cadillac Europe =

Swiss subsidiary of General Motors

Cadillac Europe GmbH

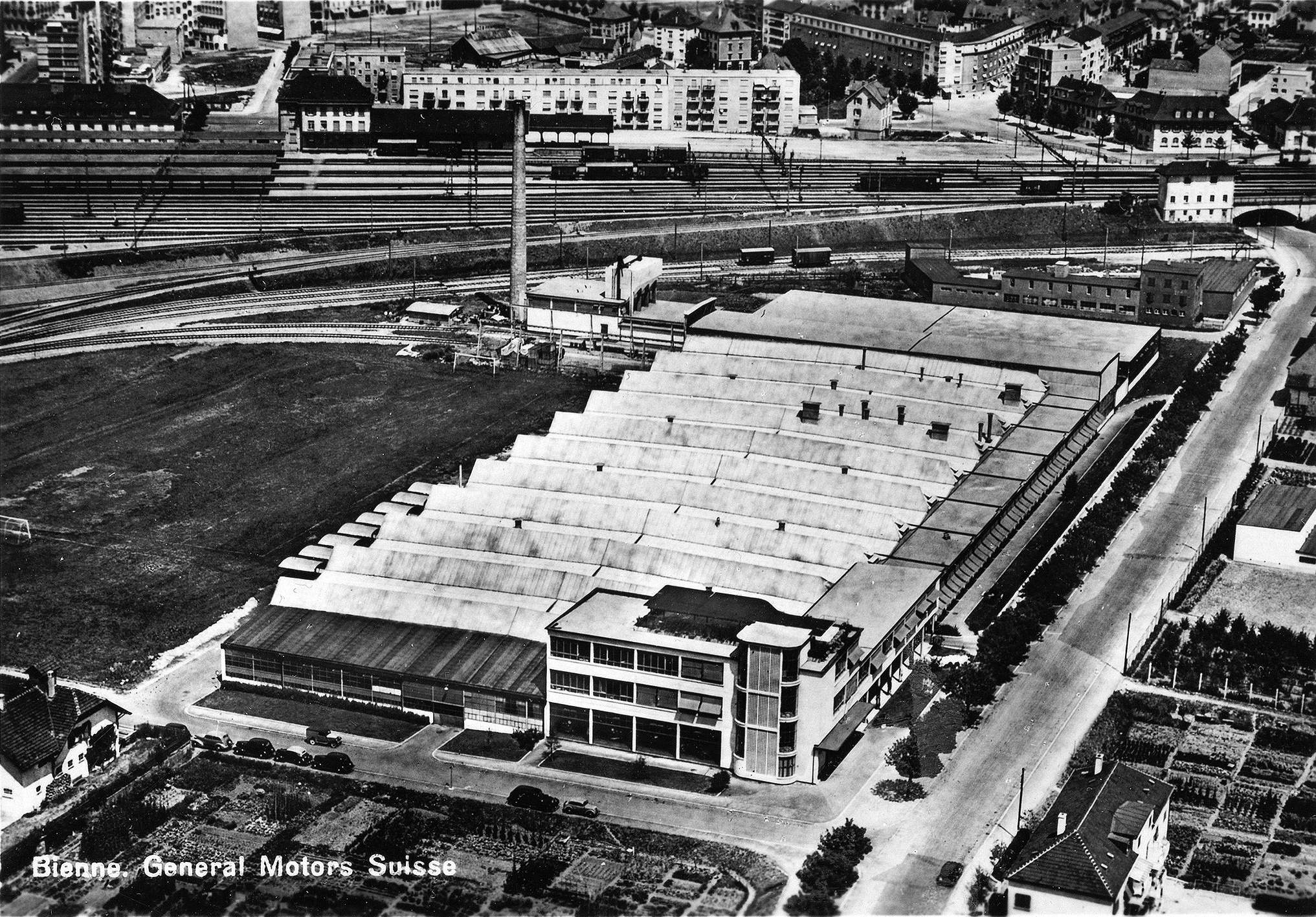
- The GM Suisse factory c. 1937
- Type: Subsidiary
- Industry: Automotive
- Founded: May 1, 1935; 91 years ago
- Headquarters: Zurich, Switzerland
- Area served: Europe
- Key people: Jean-Pierre Diernaz (CMO and Managing Director)
- Products: Automobiles
- Brands: Cadillac; Chevrolet List: Former brands: Buick; Oldsmobile; Pontiac; LaSalle; Opel; Vauxhall
- Services: Vehicle financing; Vehicle insurance
- Parent: General Motors Europe
- Website: www.cadillaceurope.com

Cadillac Europe (formerly General Motors Switzerland S.A.) is the Swiss subsidiary of US-based company General Motors that imports and commercialises Cadillac and Chevrolet vehicles for 25 countries across Europe. In the past, it was also active as a manufacturer, producing Buick, Chevrolet, Oldsmobile, Pontiac, La Salle, Opel, and Vauxhall vehicles in its Bienne factory. As of 2025, the only models imported by Cadillac Europe are the Cadillac Lyriq, Cadillac Optiq, Cadillac Vistiq, and the Chevrolet Corvette Stingray, Z06, and E-Ray.

== History ==
General Motors was looking for a suitable location for an assembly plant in Switzerland in the 1930s. Guido Müller, the then city president of Biel, offered a finished factory and tax exemption for five years. On 2 May 1935, "General Motors Suisse" was founded in Biel/Bienne. The company register derogates from 1 May 1935. The first vehicle was produced on 5 February 1936. Until the outbreak of World War II, about 2,000 vehicles were produced each year.

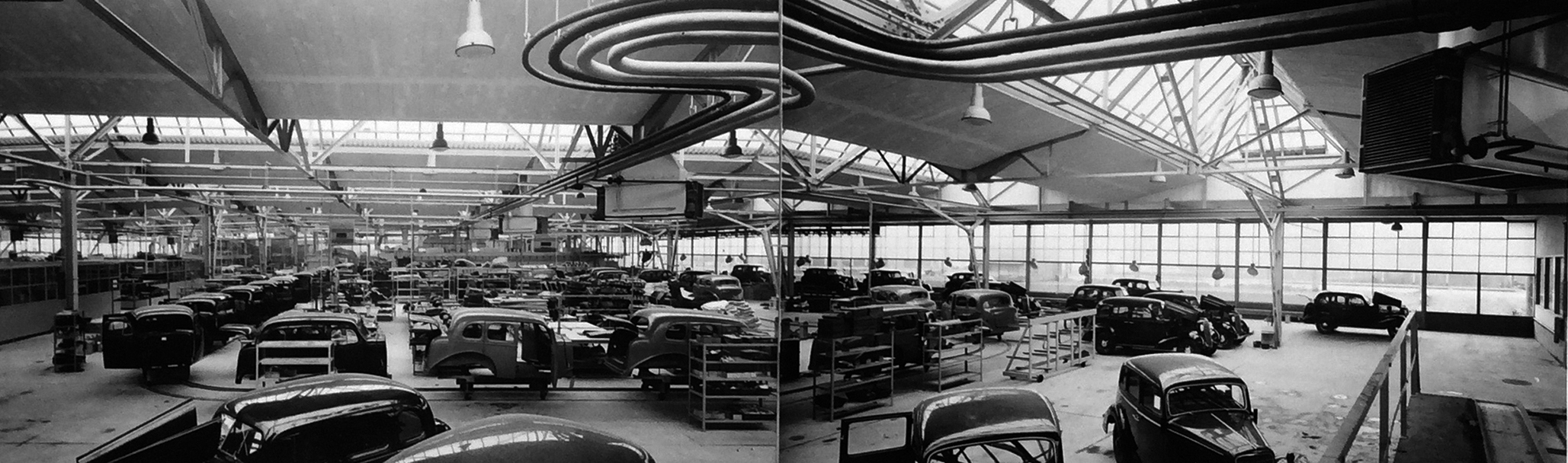
Interior of the factory, c. 1937

After the end of the war, production continued and expanded. At the end of the 1950s, annual capacity was 14,500 cars. In the mid-1960s, more than 1,000 people were employed. In 1970, 17,102 vehicles were created. In addition, imported vehicles were sold. At that time, problems started. Switzerland belonged to the European Free Trade Association, not to the European Union. A Free Trade Agreement of 22 July 1972 between the European Economic Community and Switzerland was in force from 1 January 1973. The plan was to assemble upper class cars such as the Opel Diplomat. The following oil crisis from 16 October 1973 caused the sales of such vehicles to fall rapidly, after which cheaper models were assembled again. The last vehicle, an Opel, was produced on August 14, 1975. A total of 329,864 vehicles were manufactured.

The company was then limited to imports and distribution. In 1994, it was renamed "Opel Suisse SA", later "Opel Svizzera SA" and "Opel Schweiz AG". On 17 November 2003, the old company name was accepted again. Alternative or translated names were "General Motors Schweiz AG", "General Motors Svizzera SA" and "General Motors Switzerland Ltd." On 13 April 2004, there was a merger agreement with Saab Automobile Schweiz AG, which was acquired. Saab belonged to General Motors at the time. On 14 April 2004, the head office was relocated to Opfikon. On 24 May 2012, there was another merger agreement, this time with General Motors Europe AG.

On 6 March 2017, Opel was sold by General Motors to the Groupe PSA. The next merger agreement followed on 30 June 2017. As a result of this, General Motors Suisse changed its name to Cadillac Europe GmbH in the legal form of limited liability. An alternative or translated company name was Cadillac Europe LLC. On 16 February 2018, the headquarters was moved to Glattpark.

== Brands ==
Marque	Since	To
Buick	1936	1958
Cadillac	1938	1940
Chevrolet	1936	1938
LaSalle	1936	1937
Oldsmobile	1936	1958
Opel	1936	1975
Pontiac	1936	1959
Ranger	1970	1975
Vauxhall	1946	1971

== Gallery ==
Some models produced by GM Suisse:

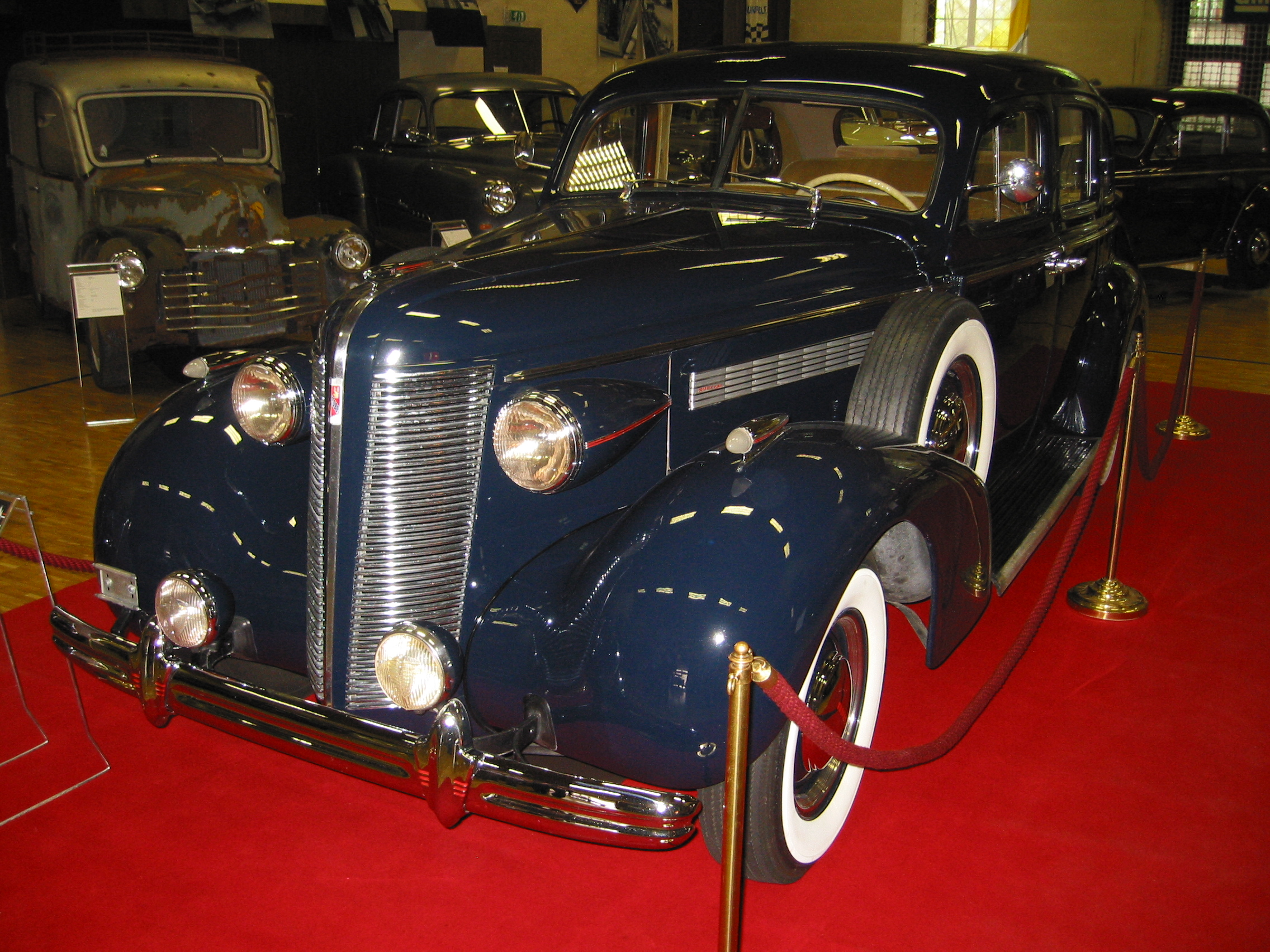
1936 Buick Eight Special

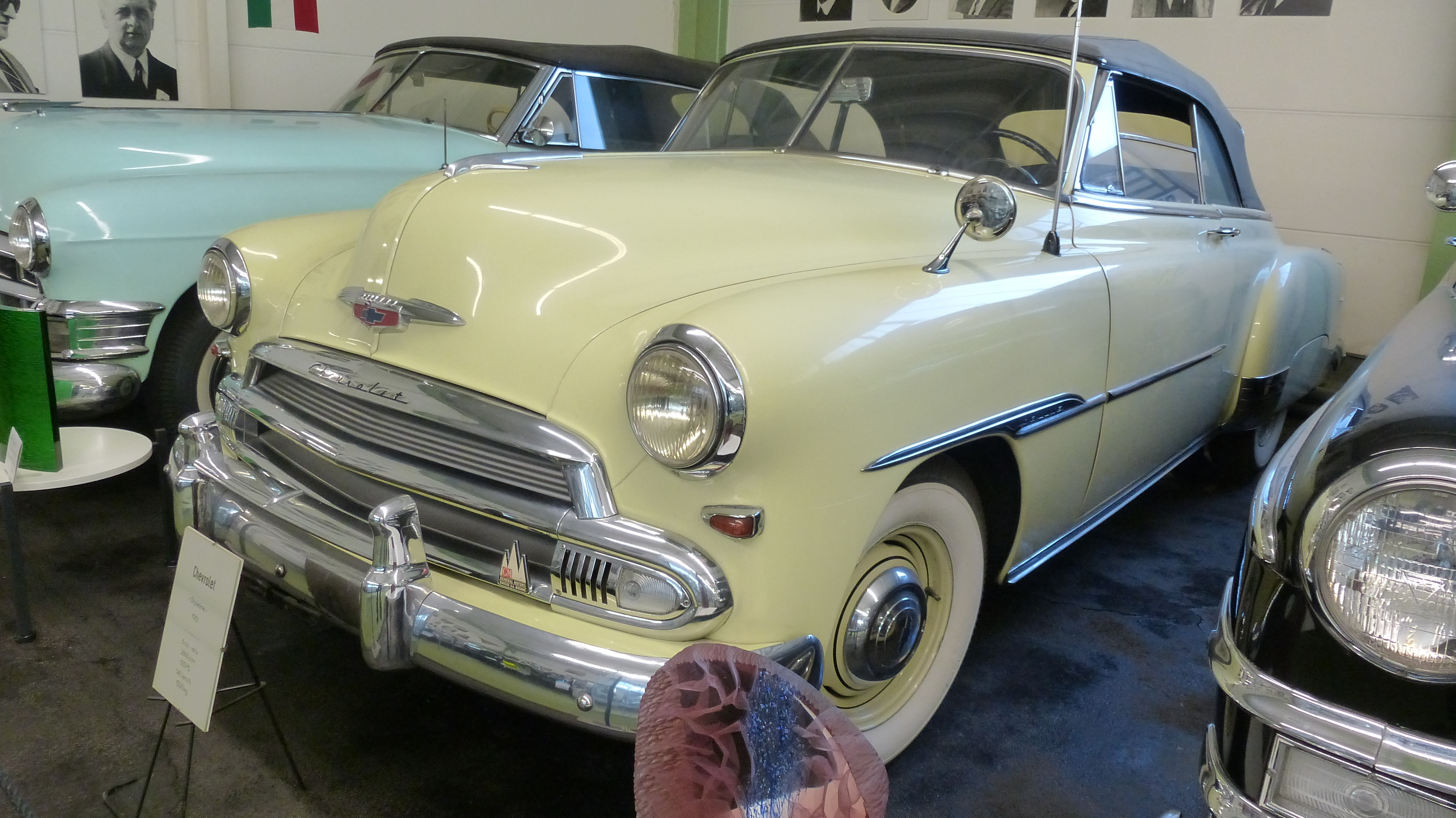
1951 Chevrolet Styleline

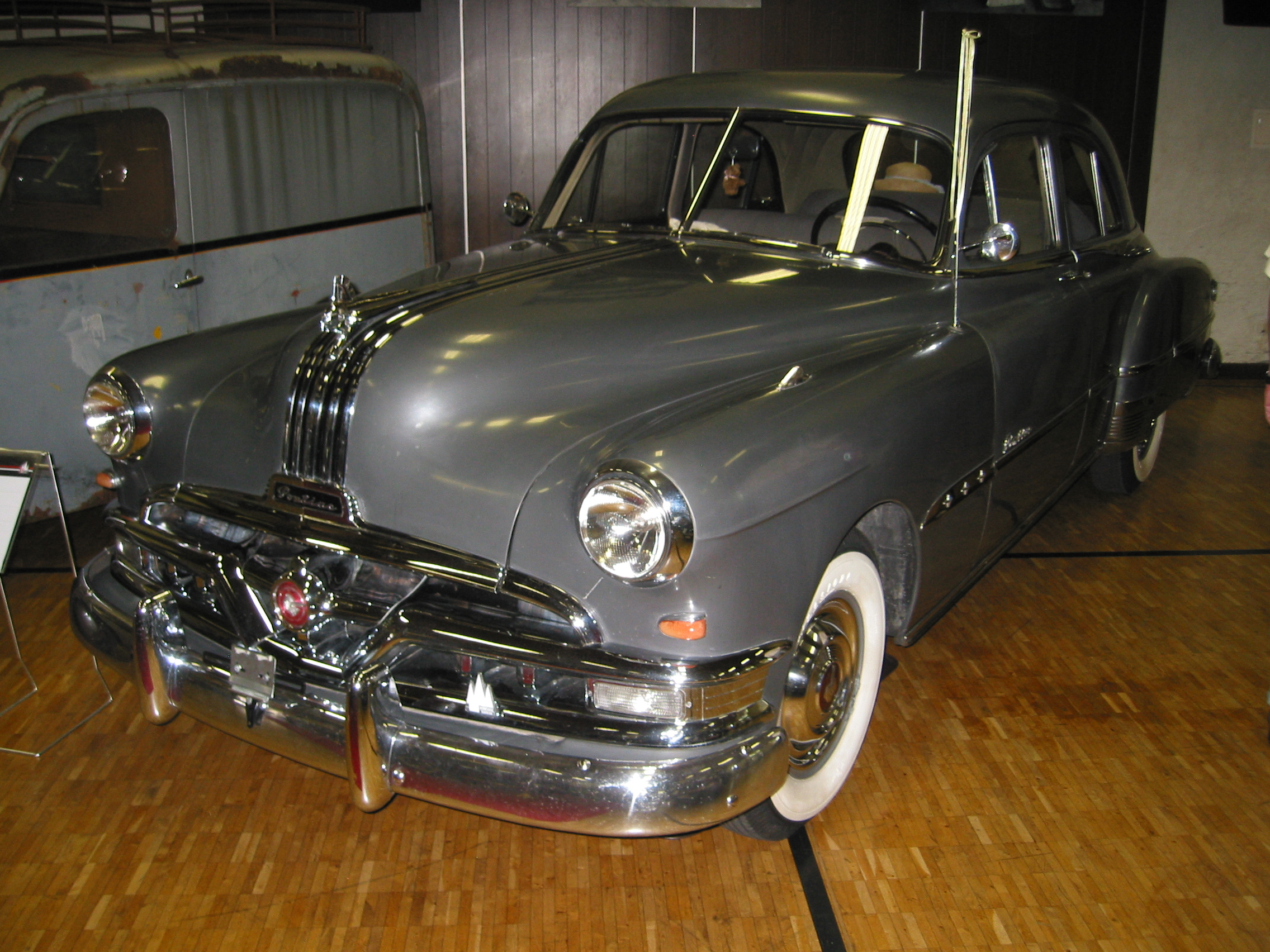
1951 Pontiac Chieftain

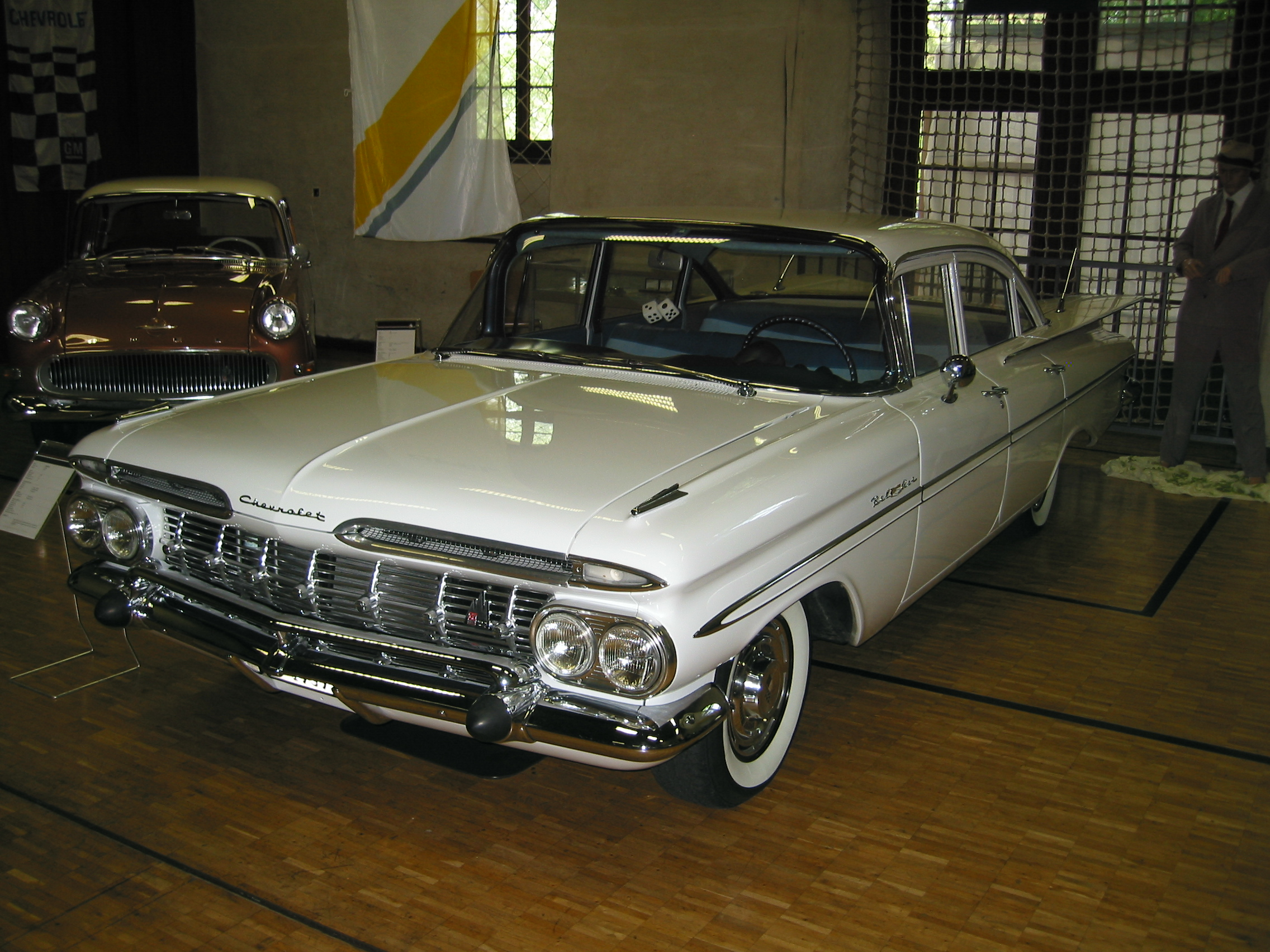
1959 Chevrolet Bel Air

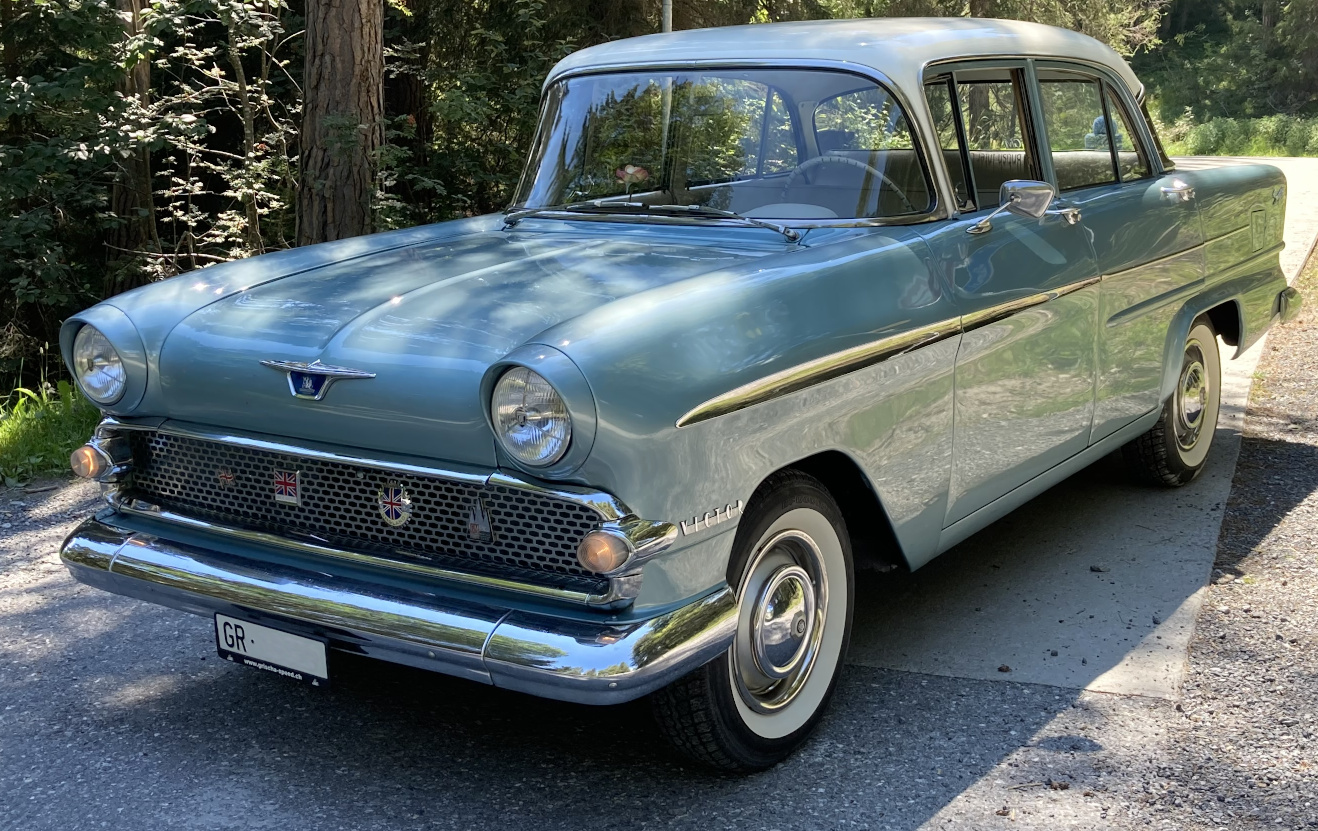
1960 Vauxhall Victor

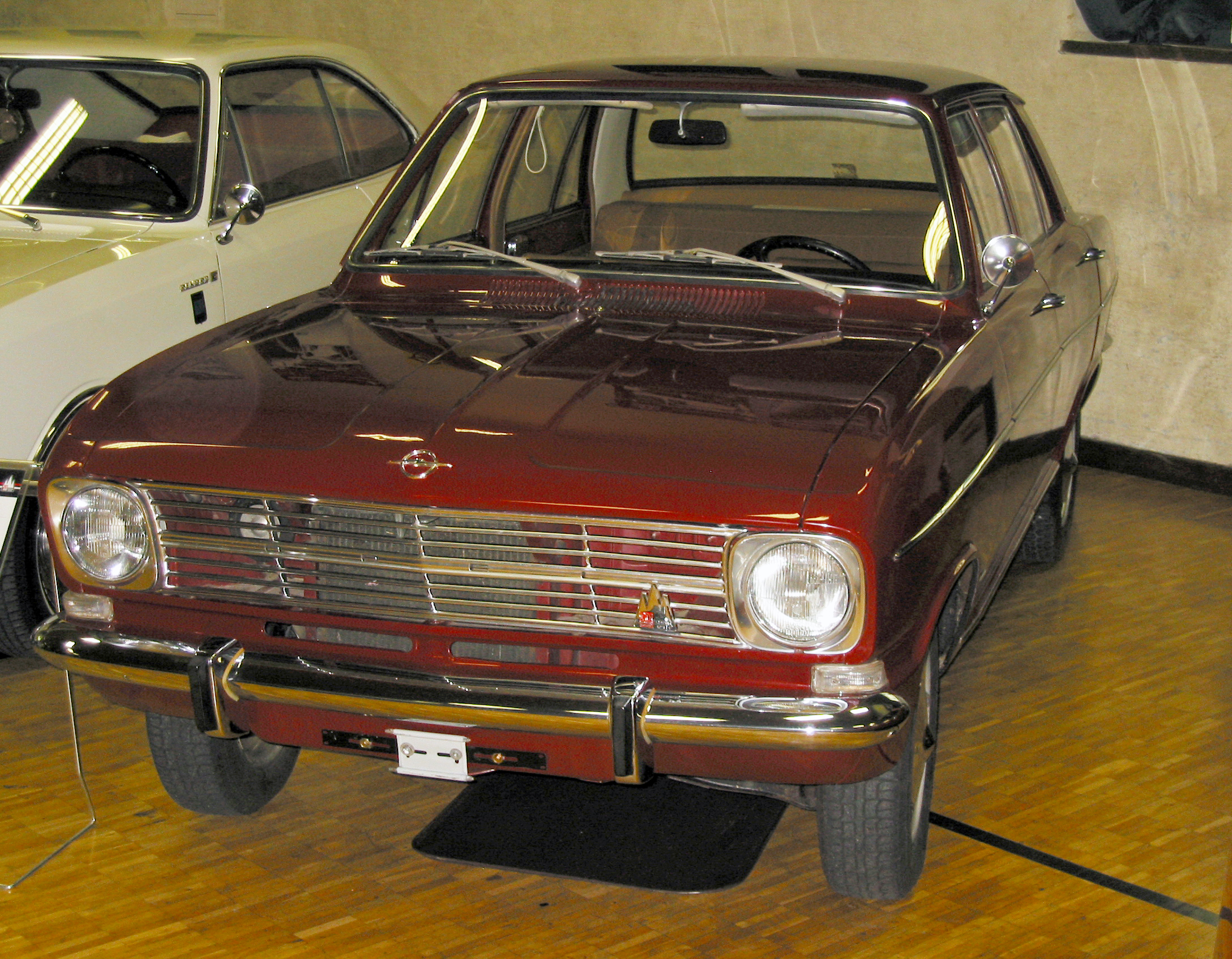
1968 Opel Kadett
