= Acqua di Giò =

Men's fragrance by Giorgio Armani

Fragrance by Giorgio Armani
- Designed for: Men
- Released: 1996
- Label: Giorgio Armani
- Perfumer(s): Alberto Morillas
- Concentration: Eau de toilette
- Flanker(s): Acqua di Giò Profumo (2015)
- Awards: Fragrance Foundation Hall of Fame, Men's (2012)

Acqua di Giò is a men's fragrance released by Giorgio Armani in 1996. It was composed by the perfumer Alberto Morillas and is produced under licence by L'Oréal Luxe. It has remained in production since its launch and was inducted into the Fragrance Foundation's Hall of Fame in 2012.

== Composition ==
The original eau de toilette is an aquatic composition built on Calabrian bergamot, neroli, citrus and rosemary. A variant, Acqua di Giò Profumo, also composed by Morillas, was introduced in 2015 with a woody and spicy character using patchouli and incense. By 2024 the line was sold in eau de toilette, eau de parfum and parfum concentrations.

== Advertising ==
Armani has used a succession of male models as the face of the fragrance, each photographed by an established fashion photographer. Larry Scott appeared in the first campaign in 1996, shot by Herb Ritts; Lars Burmeister followed in 2006, photographed by Peter Lindbergh; and Simon Nessman was shot by Bruce Weber.

In 2015 Jason Morgan became the fourth face of the fragrance, appearing in two campaigns photographed by Matthew Brookes and filmed in Sardinia and London. Armani selected Morgan personally.

The actor Aaron Taylor-Johnson fronted a campaign released on 16 February 2024, directed by Yoann Lemoine and filmed on Pantelleria, in which he dives from a cliff into the sea.

== Commercial performance ==
Distribution of Acqua di Giò grew from 20,000 to 30,000 retail outlets internationally in the two decades after its launch, with the United States and Italy consistently its two largest markets. Executives at L'Oréal Luxe estimated in 2015 that the fragrance accounted for about 30 per cent of Armani's total perfume sales, and industry sources quoted by Women's Wear Daily put combined retail sales of the eau de toilette and Profumo for that year at between €280 million and €300 million.

Since 2010 Armani has tied the fragrance to Acqua for Life, a clean-water initiative run with Green Cross International, which the company said had produced 230 million litres of drinking water by 2015.
