= Truefitt & Hill =

British barbershop

Coordinates: 51.5058°N 0.1388°W

Logo of Truefitt & Hill

Truefitt & Hill is the oldest barbershop in the world, established in 1805 by William Francis Truefitt. The firm received its first Royal Warrant from King George III. In 1911, Edwin Hill set up a barber shop on Old Bond Street where H.P. Truefitt (William's nephew) moved in 1935 to create Truefitt & Hill. Other Truefitt regional outlets were merged into the present company in 1941. The present location of Truefitt & Hill at 71 St. James's Street, was taken up in 1994. The brand has locations in Toronto, Chicago, Melbourne, Beijing, Canberra, Sydney, Bangladesh, India, Kuala Lumpur, Singapore, Kuwait, Bangkok, Nepal, Sri Lanka, Bhutan, Vietnam, Myanmar, and the Czech Republic.

== Products and services ==
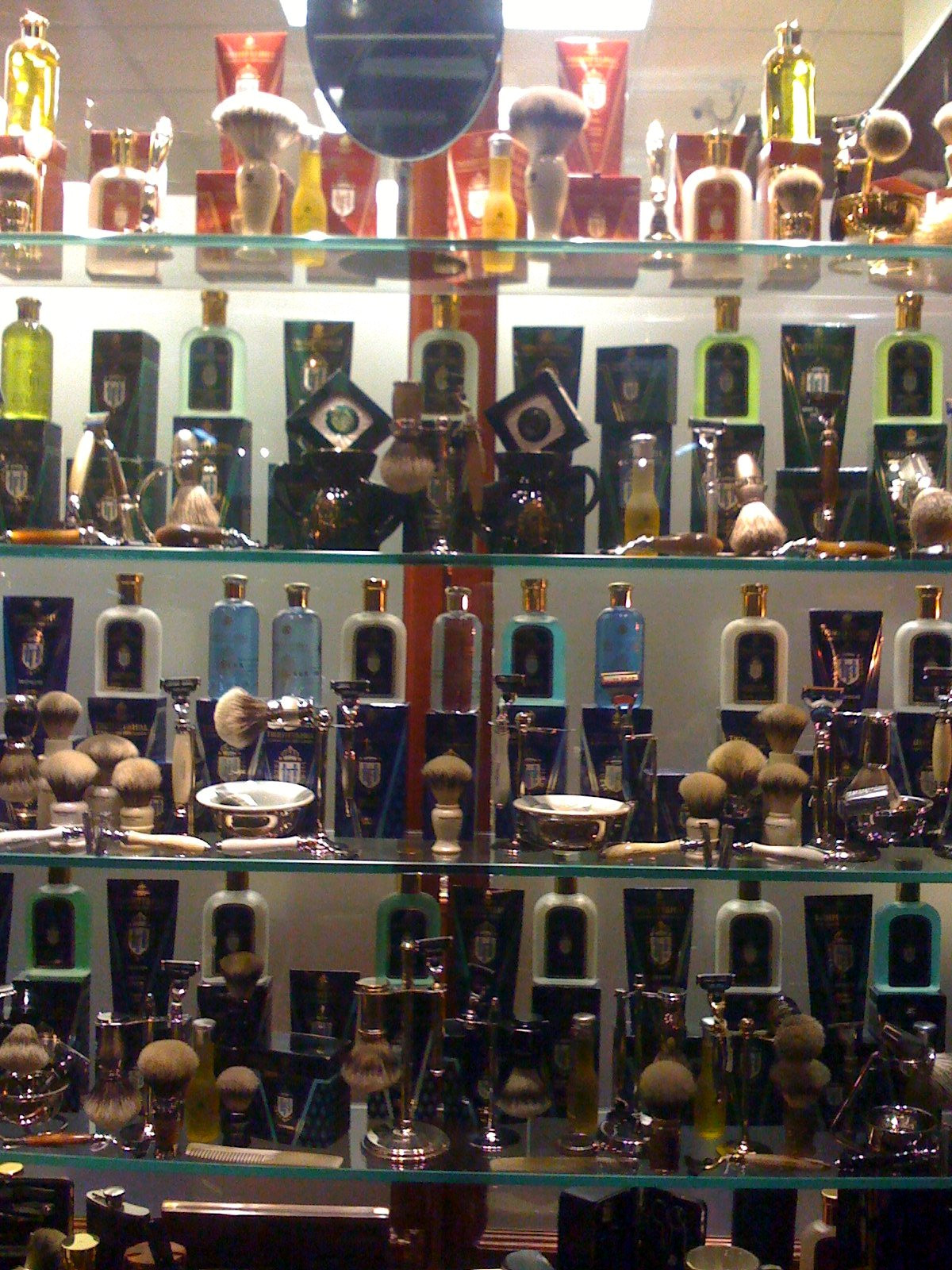
Truefitt & Hill products

Their products include an array of modern and traditional toiletry goods and accessories. They have a mixture of scents that include some that have been developed for the modern market (1805, Trafalgar and No.10) and also the more traditional scents (some dating back almost 200 years) such as Spanish Leather, Sandalwood, West Indian Limes, Lavender and Rose.

Some of the services they provided in the past (such as wig making) have now become obsolete in the mainstream, but other traditional services (such as the Traditional Hot Towel Wet Shave) have made a popular come back in the past 50 years, with the service often being part of a birthday surprise or wedding party group activity. Although providing various modern products and services, Truefitts still supplies a number of traditional products, such as Hair Tonic (C.A.R. Lotion, Bay Rum, Oleaqua and the like), Hair Cream, Shaving Soap and Bath Oil. A special place is occupied by fragrances such as 1805, Trafalgar and Spanish Leather, inspired by English traditions and natural motifs.

== Clientele ==
Famous clients include the British royal family, members of visiting Royal Households, business leaders, Members of Parliament, Frank Sinatra, Winston Churchill, Charles Dickens, John Wayne, various Ambassadors and the diplomatic service and visiting dignitaries. The C.A.R. hair lotion was a favourite with 'Captain' Hartman -director of Lendrum & Hartman Limited, who was fetched from the shop in Bond Street by his staff to serve the Prince of Wales (Duke of Windsor). Another ardent user of C.A.R. was Josslyn Hay, 22nd Earl of Erroll, part of the so called Happy Valley set in Kenya in 1941. Up until 2021, Truefitt & Hill held a Royal Warrant by appointment to the Prince Philip, Duke of Edinburgh.
