= Antonia Wesseloh =

German fashion model (born 1995)

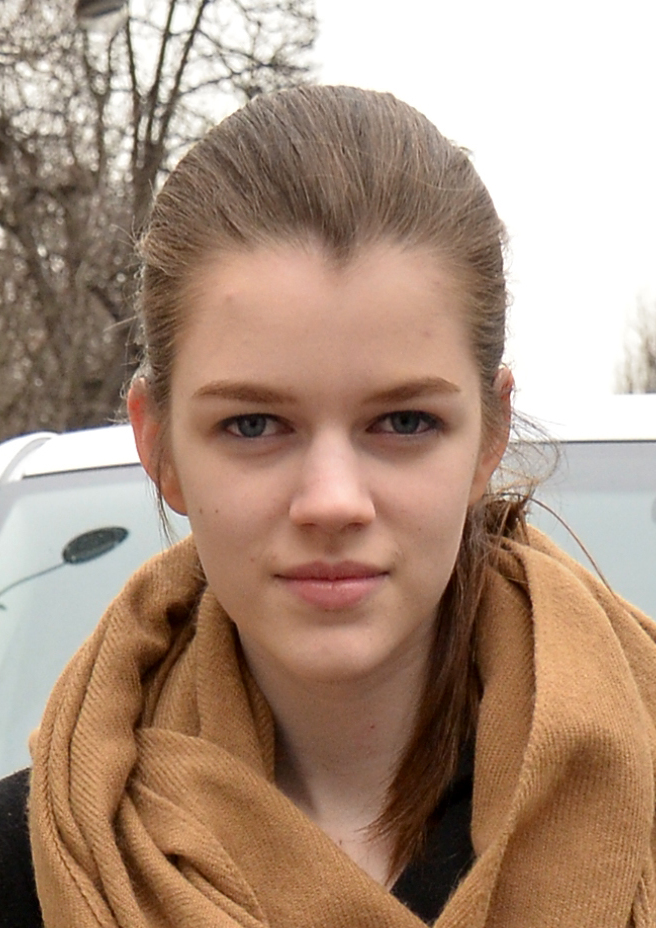
- Wesseloh in 2012
- Born: Antonia Frederika Wesseloh; 25 July 1995 (age 31); Hamburg, Germany
- Occupation: Model
- Modeling information
- Height: 1.79 m (5 ft 10 1/2 in)
- Hair color: Brown
- Eye color: Blue
- Agency: Silent Models (New York); Marilyn Agency (Paris); Monster Management (Milan); Traffic Models (Barcelona); Photogenics LA (Los Angeles); Bravo Models (Tokyo); Le Management (Copenhagen, Stockholm, Hamburg) (mother agency)

Antonia Frederika Wesseloh (born 25 July 1995) is a German fashion model.

== Career ==
Wesseloh sent photos to several modeling agencies; while others rejected, Modelwerk Modeling Agency signed her immediately.

She debuted at Escada. She has walked for Richard Chai, Rodarte, Louis Vuitton, Anna Sui, Balenciaga, Marc Jacobs, Miu Miu, Giles, Just Cavalli, Peter Som, Loewe, Lacoste, Thakoon, Sonia Rykiel, Costume National, Prabal Gurung, Marni, Chanel, Viktor & Rolf, Topshop, Yigal Azrouel, and Cynthia Rowley in her first season.

In 2011, renowned photographer Steven Meisel selected her for a Prada campaign.

Wesseloh has appeared in Vogue, i-D, Dazed, Vogue Japan and Vogue China.
