= CPL Aromas =

Fragrance company

CPL AROMAS
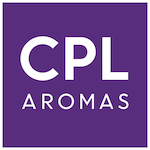
- Company type: Family business partner
- Industry: Fragrance
- Founded: 1971
- Headquarters: Bishop's Stortford, UK
- Key people: Chris Pickthall, CEO; Nick Pickthall, COO
- Products: Fragrances
- Number of employees: 600 (2020)
- Website: cplaromas.com

CPL Aromas is a global fragrance house with its headquarters in the UK. The company operates internationally, with offices and manufacturing centers spread across various countries. Established in 1971 by the Pickthall family, CPL Aromas initially started as an independent firm.

== Timeline ==
- CPL Aromas was founded in 1971 by brothers, Michael and Terry Pickthall.
- 1990 – CPL Aromas established its Brixworth site as its European manufacturing facility and launched CPL Aromas Far East too.
- 1991 – CPL Aromas acquired H.E. Daniel Ltd and established in Germany and the USA.
- 1994 – CPL Aromas was floated on the London Stock Exchange.
- 1995 – The acquisition of Du Crocq Aromatics, Netherlands and Daniel Blayn, France.
- 2015 – AromaCore technology launched, and an automated production facility was established in Dubai.
- 2021 – CPL Aromas launched its new website and branding, and the company celebrated its 50th anniversary.

== Locations ==
CPL Aromas has sites in 18 international locations, serving customers in over 100 countries.

== Notable projects ==
The company is a partner of the Catholic Agency for Oversees Development (CAFOD). In 2020, this partnership reached its 20th anniversary.

CPL Aromas is the co-founder of the College of Fragrance for the Visually Impaired (COFVI), a charitable organisation.

The company participated in the founding of NAB Perfumery College in India, an educational initiative by the National Association for the Blind.
