= William Penhaligon =

Cornish barber and perfumer (1837–1902)

William Henry Penhaligon (1837–1902) was a British barber and perfumer, the founder of the British perfume house Penhaligon's, and Court Barber and Perfumer to Queen Victoria.

== Early life ==
William Henry Penhaligon was born in 1837 in Madron, Penzance, Cornwall.

== Career ==
In Penzance, a barber shop on Chapel Street was kept in the 1830s by Humphrey Roberts, who had succeeded his father, who died of cholera in 1832. Roberts was later succeeded by William Matthews, who in turn was the predecessor of William Penhaligon and of a Mr. Hooper. Penhaligon is listed as a hairdresser at 9 Chapel Street in 1864, and a Robert Hooper, hairdresser, at the same address in 1883.

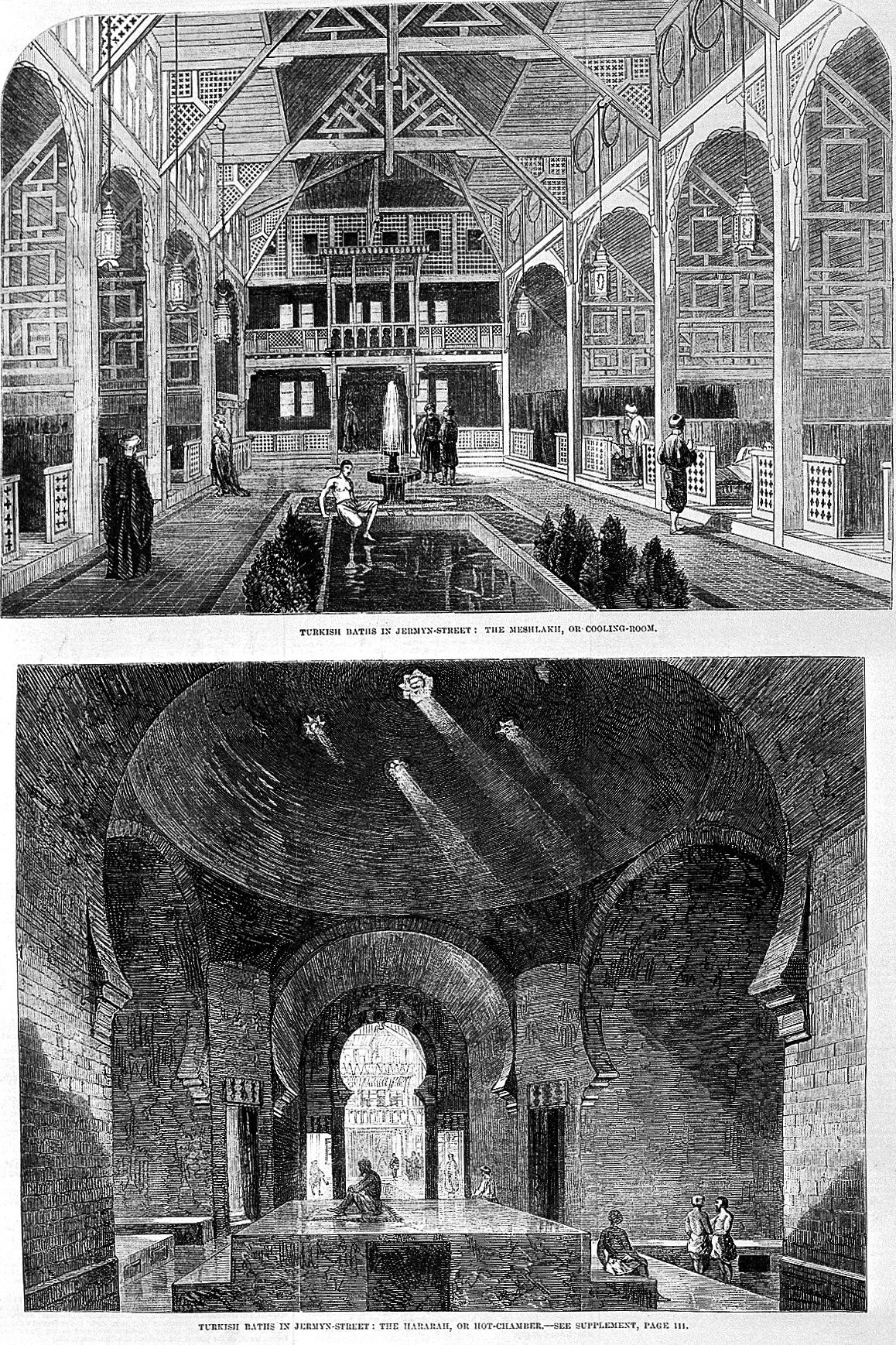
The Turkish Baths at 76 Jermyn Street, 1862

In 1869, Penhaligon moved to London, and worked as a barber at the London Hammam, the Victorian Turkish baths at 76 Jermyn Street. In 1872, Penhaligon launched his first commercial fine fragrance, Hammam Bouquet, and in 1874 he took over the running of the baths' salon, and expanded it to offer perfumery and related items. In 1880, he went into business with his foreman, and Penhaligon's & Jeavons was founded, with premises a few doors away from the baths, also in Jermyn Street.

Penhaligon died in 1902, and the following year the company received its first Royal Warrant, from Queen Alexandra.

== Personal life ==
The 1881 United Kingdom census shows William and his wife Elizabeth had several children (Clara, Ida, William, and Walter), and he employed 14 assistants.
