= Alberto Morillas =

Spanish perfumer

- Born: 1950 (age 75–76); Seville, Spain
- Occupation: Perfumer
- Years active: 1970–present
- Employer: Firmenich
- Notable work: Calvin Klein CK One; Giorgio Armani Acqua di Giò; Marc Jacobs Daisy; Fragrance One Office for Men
- Awards: Prix François Coty

Alberto Morillas (born 1950) is a Spanish perfumer. He is a master perfumer at Swiss fragrance and flavor firm Firmenich, where his notable creations have included Calvin Klein CK One, Giorgio Armani Acqua di Giò and Marc Jacobs Daisy. He has an independent line called Mizensir.

== Early life ==
Morillas was born in 1950 in Seville, Spain and moved to Switzerland at age ten. He studied for two years at the École des Beaux Arts in Geneva.

He cites as early scent memories his mother's bottle of Rochas Femme and his father's hair tonic.

== Career ==
=== Firmenich ===
Mainly self-taught, Morillas began working in perfumery at 20, inspired by a Vogue article about French perfumer Jean-Paul Guerlain. He joined Swiss fragrance and flavor firm Firmenich in 1970 and has gone on to create nearly 7000 perfumes. He established himself with the 1975 creation Must de Cartier, the jewelry company's first fragrance.

Among Morillas's notable creations is CK One, developed with Harry Fremont in 1994 for Calvin Klein fashion brand. In the mid-1990s, CK One had annual sales of about $90 million (USD) and in 2007 still sold about $30 million annually in the United States. In Perfumes: The Guide, Luca Turin gave CK One four of five stars, describing it as a "radiant citrus" that combines "soapy, fresh top notes" with heart and base notes simultaneously, creating a linear effect in which the scent sustains one "chord" rather than shapeshifting over the course of the day: "Time forever stands still at 8 a.m.: the frozen morning of a day full of promise." It is often cited as the first "unisex" fragrance (though historians note that dividing fragrances by gender was itself a relative novelty, a development of 20th-century marketing techniques.)

=== Other projects ===
In 1997, Morillas and his wife began a line of scented candles called Mizensir, which grew to offer 80 different candles. In 2015, Morillas expanded the brand to include 17 perfumes. In collaboration with Penhaligon's, Morillas also has a custom perfumery service, Bespoke by Alberto Morillas, based the Salon de Parfum in department store Harrods in London.

=== Awards ===
Morillas won the Prix François Coty in 2003.

== Personal life ==
Morillas lives in Geneva, after periods in Paris and New York.

== Perfumes ==
- Calvin Klein CK One (1994)
- Dolce & Gabbana Light Blue Pour Homme (2007)
- Estée Lauder Pleasures (1995)
- Givenchy Pi (1998)
- Giorgio Armani Acqua di Gio (1996)
- Giorgio Armani Acqua di Gio Pour Homme
- Kenzo Flower (2000)
- Tommy Hilfiger Tommy
- Marc Jacobs Daisy
- Valentino Valentina (2011)
- Versace Pour Homme
- Gucci Bloom
- Gucci Bloom Acqua di Fiori (2018)
- Gucci Bloom Nettare di Fiori
- Gucci Guilty Absolute
- Gucci Guilty Absolute Pour Femme
- Titan Skinn
- Eric Buterbaugh Apollo Hyacinth (2015)
- Eric Buterbaugh Fragile Violet (2015)
- Eric Buterbaugh Kingston Osmanthus (2016)
- Bulgari Omnia (2003)
- Bulgari Goldea (2017)
- Bulgari Man Wood Essence (2018)
- Bulgari Omnia Pink Sapphire (2018)
- By Kilian Good Girl Gone Bad (2012)
- By Kilian Good Girl Gone Bad Extreme (2017)
- By Kilian Musk Oud
- Le Labo Vanille 44
- Mizensir Bois De Mysore
- Mizensir L'Envers Du Paradis
- Mizensir Little Bianca
- Mizensir Sweet Praline
- Mizensir Vanilla Bergamot
- Mizensir Eau De Gingembre
- Must de Cartier (1975)
- Penhaligon's Iris Prima (2013)
- Thierry Mugler Cologne
- Zara Home Aqua Bergamota (2016)
- Zara Home Evitorial Twist (2016)
- Fragrance One Office For Men (2018)
- Philipp Plein The $kull (2019)
- Philipp Plein No Limit$ (2020)
- Philipp Plein No Limit$ Super Fre$h (2021)
- Philipp Plein Plein Fatale (2022)
- Philipp Plein No Limit$ Gold (2023)
- Philipp Plein Plein Fatale Rose (2023)
- Philipp Plein The $kull Gold Edition Parfum (2024)
- Philipp Plein No Limit$ Platinum (2024)
- Philipp Plein Plein Fatale Rose Intense (2025)
- Mizensir Golden Oud (2020)
- O Boticário Malbec Bleu (2021)
- Fragrance One Black Tie (2021)
- Adleen Haute Parfumerie Luban (2025)
- Dolce & Gabbana Light Blue Pour Homme (2026)
- Ferrari Uomo (2009)
