= Hannah Holman =

American model (born 1991)

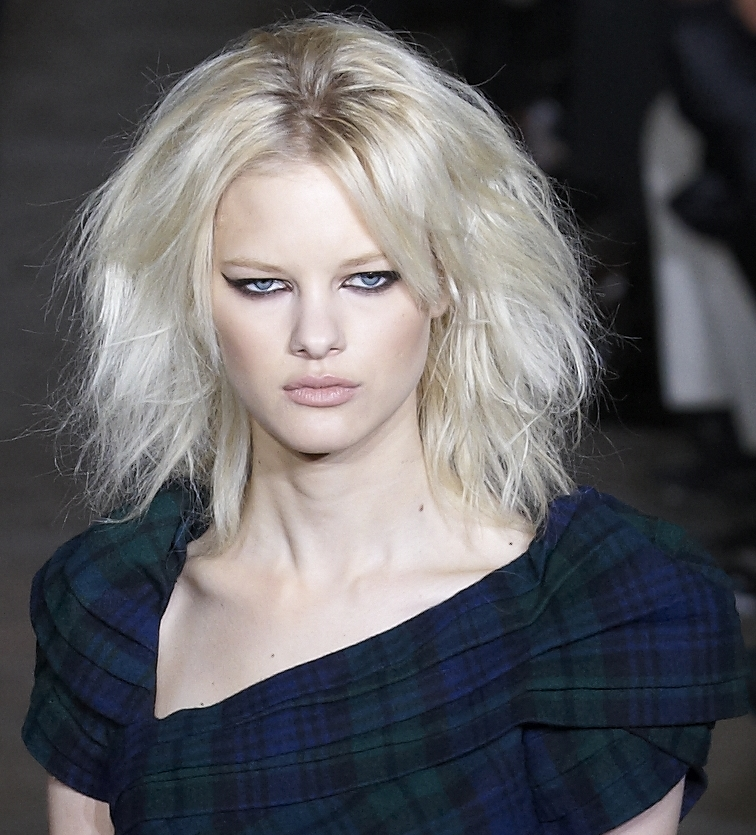
- Holman walks for Jill Stuart in 2010
- Born: March 12, 1991 (age 35); Leamington, Utah, U.S.
- Modeling information
- Height: 1.73 m (5 ft 8 in)
- Hair color: Blonde
- Eye color: Blue
- Agency: HEROES Model Management (New York); Oui Management (Paris); Elite Model Management (Milan); The Hive Management (London); VISION Los Angeles (Los Angeles); Priscilla's Model Management (Sydney)

Hannah Elizabeth Nielson Holman (born March 12, 1991, in Leamington, Utah) is an American model.

== Early life ==
The child of a schoolteacher mom and cattle rancher father. She was raised in a small (population approx 210) town of Leamington, Utah. She is the youngest of 4 children. She is skilled as a western horse rider, having helped her father for years. Holman was discovered at 15 at a shopping mall.

== Career ==
She has appeared in editorials for i-D, V Magazine, W Magazine, Dazed & Confused, Interview Magazine, Allure, and Japanese, British, Australian, Teen, American, Russian, Italian, and French Vogue and on the covers of French Revue de Modes, D, and Elle Portugal. Holman has appeared in campaigns for Alexander Wang, Burberry, H&M, Iceberg, Jill Stuart, Marc Jacobs, Max Mara, Miu Miu, Chloe and Uniqlo. She has walked in fashion shows for designers including Alberta Ferretti, Antonio Marras, Betty Jackson, Chanel, Christopher Kane, Prada, Erdem, Fendi, Gaspard Yurkievich, Jaeger London, Jonathan Saunders, Karl Lagerfeld, Loewe, Louis Vuitton, Marc Jacobs, Marc by Marc Jacobs, Missoni, Miu Miu, Nina Ricci, Philosophy di Alberta Ferretti, Valentino, Hogan, Iceberg, John Rocha, Les Copains, Mary Katrantzou, Pringle of Scotland, Sonia Rykiel, Topshop Unique, and Vivienne Westwood Red Label.

She has appeared in editorials for i-D, V Magazine, W Magazine, Dazed & Confused, Interview Magazine, Allure, and Japanese, British, Australian, Teen, American, Russian, Italian, and French Vogue.

In 2008, Holman appeared in the American Eagle Spring 2008 campaign. Her first major campaign was Miu Miu Spring/Summer 2009, photographed by Mert and Marcus. In the Spring/Summer 2010 season, Holman was the face of Marc by Marc Jacobs(photographed by Juergen Teller) and T by Alexander Wang (photographed by Daniel Jackson), and appeared in campaigns for Jill Stuart(photographed by Mario Sorrenti), Burberry Japan, See by Chloe (photographed by Mario Sorrenti) and Uniqlo(photographed by Ellen von Unwerth). Holman appeared in campaigns for Ice Iceberg and Max Mara in the Fall/Winter 2010 season. For Spring/Summer 2011, she appeared in campaigns for the Marc Jacobs Daisy Eau so Fresh fragrance, H&M, Marc Jacobs, Miu Miu, Holman appeared in the Fall/Winter 2011 campaign for Moschino Cheap and Chic. For Spring/Summer 2012, Holman appeared in the Marc Jacobs Daisy Eau so Fresh fragrance TV commercial along with Frida Gustavsson and Sophie Srej, which was the first Marc Jacobs TV commercial. The commercial was directed by TJ Wilcox and Juergen Teller. Holman appeared in the Orla Kiely Spring/Summer 2013 campaign.

Holman made her runway debut in 2009 for the Resort 2010 season, opening Miu Miu and closing Prada. In the Fall 2010 season, she opened and closed Jonathan Saunders, and walking for designers such as Alberta Ferretti, Chanel, Christopher Kane, Fendi, Gaspard Yurkievich, Jaeger London, Karl Lagerfeld, Loewe, Louis Vuitton, Marc by Marc Jacobs, Marc Jacobs, Missoni, Nina Ricci, Philosophy di Alberta Ferretti and Valentino. For Autumn/Winter 2010, she walked in shows such as Antonio Marras, Betty Jackson, Damir Doma, Erdem, Hogan, Iceberg, Jill Stuart, John Rocha, Jonathan Saunders, Les Copains, Louis Vuitton, Marc by Marc Jacobs, Marc Jacobs, Mary Katrantzou, Missoni, Pringle of Scotland, Roksanda Ilincic, Sonia Rykiel, Topshop Unique, and Vivienne Westwood Red Label for the Spring/Summer 2011 season, Holman opened Jeremy Scott, and walked in Emanuel Ungaro, Marc Jacobs, Marc by Marc Jacobs, Louis Vuitton, and Sonia Rykiel. Holman walked in Cushnie et Ochs, Marc by Marc Jacobs and PPQ in the Fall/Winter 2012 season.
