= Irina Kulikova (model) =

Russian fashion model (born 1991)

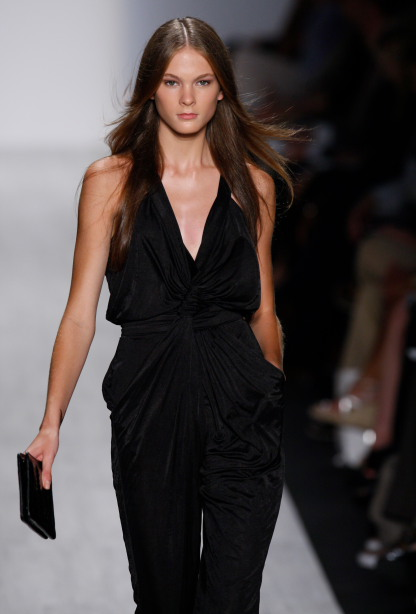
- Kulikova, September 2008 at BCBG Max Azria
- Born: 6 August 1991 (age 34); Slobodskoy, Kirov Oblast, Russian SFSR
- Modeling information
- Height: 6 ft 0 in (1.83 m)
- Hair color: Brown
- Eye color: Green
- Agency: Uno Models (Barcelona); Mega Model Agency (Hamburg); NIK Model Management (Moscow); Vision Scouting (Shanghai)

Irina Kulikova (Russian: Ирина Куликова; born 6 August 1991) is a Russian fashion model. She was discovered in a Moscow restaurant by Ivan Bart of IMG Models and actress Liv Tyler. Kulikova was named one of the top 10 models of 2007 by V. She is currently represented by NIK Model Management in Russia and One Management in New York.

During her first season in Fall/Winter 2007 she opened the shows for Prada and Nina Ricci, closed the shows of Yves Saint Laurent and Louis Vuitton, and was an exclusive for Calvin Klein in New York, among others. She has opened shows for Dior, Donna Karan, BCBG Max Azria, Marc Jacobs, John Galliano, and Sonia Rykiel, and closed shows for Peter Som, Alberta Ferretti, Proenza Schouler, Donna Karan, Moschino, Dries Van Noten, John Galliano, Sonia Rykiel, Viktor & Rolf, and Vera Wang.
