= Aliage =

1972 perfume by Estée Lauder Companies

Aliage / Alliage

Fragrance by Estée Lauder Companies
- Category: Green Chypre
- Designed for: Women
- Top notes: Primarily galbanum
- Heart notes: Primarily nutmeg
- Base notes: Primarily cedarwood
- Released: 1968
- Label: Estée Lauder Companies
- Perfumer(s): Francis Camail and Bernard Chant
- Tagline: "Take a deep breath. You're in the country. You're wearing Aliage."
- Awards: 1974 FiFi Award for Best In-Store Promotion

Aliage is a green chypre fragrance that was released in 1972 by Estée Lauder, and was the first sports fragrance. It is sold as Alliage in France. Because sports fragrances were new, some of them had a more descriptive name printed on the bottle: Aliage Sport.

The name was meant to be Alliage, which is French for "alloy", to suggest a blending or fusion of elements into a single, new creation. An order sheet accidentally had it printed as "aliage", and American labels were printed that way. The spelling error was corrected for the French market.

== Product line ==
Estée Lauder introduced Aliage as part of its Mother's Day rollout in May 1972. The launch advertising described the name as meaning "a blend," and marketed the fragrance in two initial forms: Sport Fragrance (a concentrate), and Sport Spray (a cologne).

By December 1975, the product line had expanded for the Christmas season to include other scented items alongside the fragrance itself, and advertisements distinguished two variants: Aliage Country Sport, described as "the lighter, air-washed version", and Aliage Sport Fragrance Spray, marketed with the line "one mist in the morning provides a day's worth of refreshing fragrance."

== Fragrance ==
Francis Camail at International Flavors & Fragrances (IFF) first created this fragrance as a personal project. His original formulation had 2 percent galbanum, with its notable green accord built around cis-3-hexenyl salicylate—similar to Guy Laroche Fidji (1966) and Norell Norell (1968), which were both created by Joséphine Catapano at IFF. To this, he also added allyl amyl glycolate for a green and pineapple scent and olibanum (frankincense) for a balsamic note.

Estée Lauder considered over 400 variations of this fragrance over a span of four years. Her habit was to pour multiple fragrances in the palm of her hand at once, unmeasured, and then ask perfumers to recreate qualities she detected in the resulting scents. Camail worked in Paris while Lauder was in New York, so chief perfumer Bernard Chant worked with her to further refine the formula.

The fragrance has green top notes; spicy middle notes; and woody base notes:

Top notes
Primarily galbanum; also bergamot and jasmine
Middle notes
Primarily nutmeg; also armoise and rose
Base notes
Primarily cedarwood; also oakmoss and vetiver

Fragrances with green notes were not widely popular in fragrances marketed to women, but one that came before it was Balmain Vent Vert (1947); others released in the years immediately following Aliage include Chanel Cristalle (1974) and Ralph Lauren Lauren (1978). Future fragrances that highlighted the green and pineapple scent of allyl amyl glycolate include Guy Laroche Drakkar Noir (1982) and Davidoff Cool Water (1988).
