= Aventus =

Perfume marketed by Creed

Fragrance by Creed
- Category: Fruity chypre
- Designed for: Women
- Top notes: Green apple, violet leaf, pink pepper, Calabrian bergamot
- Heart notes: Rose, styrax, Mysore sandalwood
- Base notes: Peach, cassis, amber, ylang-ylang
- Released: 2010
- Label: Creed
- Perfumer(s): Jean-Christophe Hérault and Oliver Creed
- Flanker(s): Aventus For Her (2015)
- Website: Aventus Collection

Aventus eau de parfum is a fruity-chypre fragrance produced by the French niche house, Creed. The fragrance was created by Jean-Christophe Hérault and Olivier Creed and released in September 2010 as part of their 250th anniversary celebration.

== Overview ==
Olivier Creed, creative director for Creed, claims that the inspiration for Aventus was the French military and political leader, Napoleon Bonaparte. As a result, many of the scents found within the fragrance have a link to Napoleon. For example, blackcurrants from Corsica (where Napoleon was born), and birch from Louisiana (which Napoleon ruled over for 4 years), are used.

== Scent ==
Aventus is an example of a fruity-chypre fragrance, featuring mainly citrus top notes and animalic base notes, like as oakmoss and musk. Olivier Creed has stated that, unlike the majority of perfume houses, the Creed brand focuses more on the base notes, rather than the top ones. The reason for this, they claim, is that focusing on the base notes means to fully appreciate the fragrance the wearer must take their time in order to fully understand it.

== Flankers and line extensions ==
- Aventus For Her (2016): Flanker with prominent notes of musk, green apple, bergamot, and blackcurrant.
- Aventus Cologne (2019): Masculine version with prominent notes of mandarin orange, birch, ginger, and vetiver.
- Absolu Aventus (2023): Limited edition release, with heavier notes for cool weather such as cinnamon, patchouli, and pink pepper.
- Absolu Aventus (2024): Limited edition release, with fresher notes and improved longevity and sillage than the 2023 limited edition.

== Criticism ==
Aventus has faced criticism for inconsistencies in both scent and longevity between batches, with some alleging particular batches to smell fruitier and others smokier. While these inconsistencies have not been concretely proven or addressed by the company, the number of online reviews suggest that there is some variation between batches. Additional criticism has been drawn in regards to the performance and longevity of modern Aventus batches compared to those prior to 2020. This is believed to stem from IFRA's ban on the aroma chemical Lyral, a lily of the valley raw material to which many fragrances attributed some of their high performing and long lasting quality.
