= Houbigant =

Houbigant may refer to:

- Charles François Houbigant, Biblical scholar
- Jean-François Houbigant, owner/maker of the second oldest perfumery of France
- Houbigant (perfume), perfume manufacturer
