= Creed (perfume house) =

Anglo-French multi-national niche perfume house

Creed Fragrances

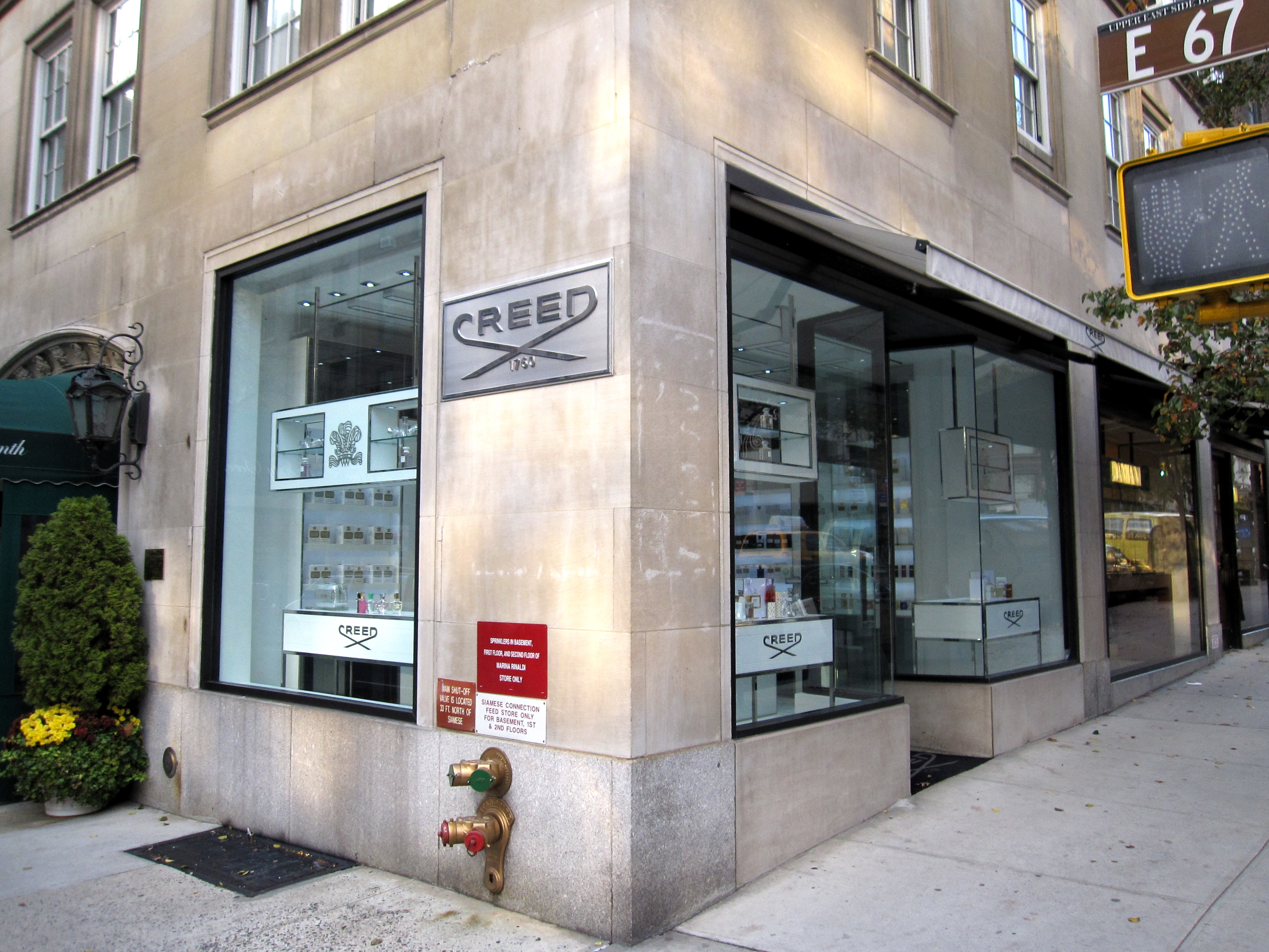
- Type: Subsidiary
- Industry: Perfume Industry
- Founded: London, England, United Kingdom as a tailoring house 1760; 266 years ago (disputed)
- Founder: James Henry Creed
- Headquarters: Paris, France
- Area served: Paris; London; New York City; Beverly Hills; Sydney; Dubai; Kuwait City; Vienna; Mexico City; Milan; Miami; Toronto; Santa Clara
- Key people: Olivier Creed (died 22 May 2026), Erwin Creed
- Products: Aventus; Green Irish Tweed; Millesime Imperial; Silver Mountain Water
- Parent: L'Oréal
- Website: creedfragrance.com

Creed Fragrances is an Anglo-French, multi-national niche perfume house based in Paris.

The company was supposedly originally founded as a tailoring house in London, England in 1760 by James Henry Creed. It has boutiques in Paris, London, New York City, Beverly Hills, Sydney, Dubai, Kuwait City, Vienna, Manila, Cebu City,Melbourne, Mexico City, Milan, Miami, Toronto (Yorkdale Mall) and Dallas in addition to stands in high end retailers across the world. The current generation of creative directors consists of Olivier Creed (died 22 May 2026) and his son Erwin Creed.

== Early history ==
James Henry Creed supposedly founded the House of Creed in London in 1760 as a tailoring establishment, however, the earliest evidence of Creed's existence hark from the late 1960s or early 1970s. It claims to have risen to fame in the mid-19th century under Henry Creed as tailors and habit makers for the fashionable dandy Count d'Orsay, Queen Victoria, and Empress Eugénie, who issued the firm of Creed & Cumberland a Royal Warrant for tailoring articles. Olivier Creed's first eponymously named fragrance was a traditional eau de cologne with matching aftershave. Its release date is unknown, although bottles are still in circulation. Creed also has other high-profile creations in its catalog such as Angelique Encens, which was said to have been originally created in 1933 for the Bishop of Paris. The history of the Creed brand prior to 1970 comes from Creed itself. No historical evidence (documents, letters, warrants, receipts, vintage bottles or packaging, business licenses, etc.) of the company’s existence before 1970 exists.

== Current business ==
In 2009, Creed opened its first stand-alone US store on Madison Avenue in New York City.

In February 2020, the private equity group BlackRock announced that it would become the majority shareholder of Creed. Sarah Rotheram was named CEO in November 2020. In June 2023, Creed was acquired by Kering for €3.5 billion.

In October 2025, Kering sold its beauty division, which includes Creed, to L'Oréal for €4 billion. On 31 March 2026, L'Oréal completed its acquisition of Kering Beauté, which included Creed. The transaction made Creed part of L'Oréal's luxury division and followed the strategic partnership between L'Oréal and Kering announced in October 2025.

== Popular culture ==
Creed has stated that it has created perfumes exclusively for celebrities and well-known political figures. Creed claims that Tabarome "was commissioned by a legendary British statesman who loved fine brandy and highest quality cigars" but this is without historical confirmation. Also, Creed's Vetiver is marketed to have been created for "one of America's leading families, a political dynasty now known worldwide for its energy, vigor, and impeccable style". This is also without historical confirmation.

=== Mainstream success ===
Creed's mainstream breakthrough success came in the mid-1980s with the fresh fougère fragrance Green Irish Tweed (1985). After Cary Grant died in 1986, Creed’s advertising made claims that he wore it. Around this time their advertising began to feature many long-dead celebrities, attempting to lend pedigree to the fledgling brand. The first trademark for Creed perfume was registered in 1979 in France.

Creed's marketing masterpiece, the fragrance Aventus (2010) has seen good commercial success. Erwin Creed stated that the popularity of Aventus enabled Creed to open its New York boutique location.

=== Authorship ===
Gabe Oppenheim's book, The Ghost Perfumer, interviews numerous perfumers and disputes Creed's claim that all of the fragrances are made in-house by members of the Creed family. Pierre Bourdon claims to be the perfumer behind Green Irish Tweed (an early iteration of Davidoff's Cool Water, also made by Bourdon), Original Santal, Silver Mountain Water, Erolfa, Millesime Imperial among others.

== Governance ==
- 2020–2024: Sarah Rotheram

== Publicly released fragrances ==
Creed claims to make fragrances exclusively for their clients and that some of those fragrances are later released to the public. These are some of the Creed fragrances sold to the general public.

- Wind Flowers
- Amalfi Flowers
- Aventus
- Absolu Aventus (2023 & 2024 editions)
- Cuir de Russie
- Herbe Marine
- Imperatrice Eugenie
- Olivier Creed Eau de Cologne/Toilette (not fully confirmed)
- Viking
- Ylang Jonquille
- Zeste Mandarine

== See also ==
- Charles Creed, fashion designer
