= Parquet (disambiguation) =

Parquet is a type of wooden flooring.

Parquet may also refer to:

== People ==
- Jeremy Parquet (born 1982), gridiron football player
- Paul Parquet (1856–1916), French perfumer

== Other uses ==
- Parquet (legal), the office for legal prosecution in some countries
- Apache Parquet, a columnar data file format

== See also ==
- Parquet Courts, an American rock band
