= Maja Herman Sekulić =

Yugoslav poet, novelist, essayist and translator

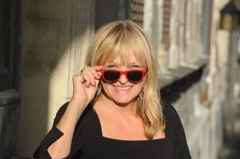
- Born: February 17, 1949 (age 77); Belgrade, Serbia, Yugoslavia
- Occupations: Poet, writer and translator
- Writing career
- Period: 1980–present

Maja Herman Sekulić (born February 17, 1949) is a former Yugoslav and Serbian poet, novelist, essayist and translator.

== Biography ==
Maja Herman Sekulić was born in Belgrade, Serbia, Yugoslavia, where she received her M.A. in World Literature from the University of Belgrade in 1977, and her PhD in Comparative Literature from Princeton, New Jersey, in 1986.

She spent 1990–91 in Germany, and 1992–7 in the Far East. Nowadays, she shares her time between New York City and Belgrade. She is a member of the Serbian Literary Association, Serbian Literary Society, Serbian and the American P.E.N. Center, Academy of American Poets and the International Federation of Journalists (FIJ).

She taught at Princeton University (1985–89), and Rutgers University (1982–84), and was guest-lecturer at Harvard, Columbia, Iowa, and other universities. Besides academic work, she has also edited the journal Night in New York from 1989 to 1990, and is a regular contributor to Recours au Poème, Belgrade dailies Politika and Blic, "Cultural Journal" on Serbian TV (RTS) and other media and literary journals. In 2017, she signed the Declaration on the Common Language of the Croats, Serbs, Bosniaks and Montenegrins.

== Bibliography ==
Her works have been translated into a number of foreign languages.

In 2013 and 2012, a number of her poems were published bilingually in English and French in Recours au Poeme, Paris.

=== Poetry collections ===
She started publishing poetry since 1981, first in Knjizevne novine, literary magazine, then in other distinguished publications.

- Kamerografija (Camerography), 1990. ISBN 86-81277-53-7 COBISS 1140492
- Kartografija ( Cartography), 1992. COBISS 28256519
- Iz muzeja lutanja ( Out of the Museum of Wondering), 1997. ISBN 86-363-0384-2 COBISS 56882700
- Iz puste zemlje (Out of the Waste Land) Paideia, 1998. It came out as a bilingual English & Serbian edition, as a tribute to and parody of T.S.Eliot and as a lament over the Balkan destiny, with cover and illustrations by Mirko Ilic. ISBN 86-82499-53-3 COBISS 61165068
- Her e-book of selected and new poems selected by the French poet Matthieu Baumier De La Terre de Désolation (Out of the Wasteland), French translation by Elizabeth Brunazzi, July 2015. ISBN 978-2-37226-049-7
- Lady of Vincha (Gospa od Vinče), poem, izdavač Pešić i sinovi, 2017 ISBN 978-86-7540-282-4 COBISS.SR-ID 237510668

Her poems were published in English in such prominent American periodicals as The Paris Review and Confrontation; were included in anthologies in English such North Dakota Quarterly, "Out of Yugoslavia" anthology,1993; The Paris Review, New York, 1992 translated by Mark Strand, American Poet Laureate; The Printed Matter, Tokyo, 1992; in German, anthology Das Buch der Rånder Lyrik, Wieser Verlag,1995; bilingual selections in French and English at Recours au Poeme, Paris, 2012 and 2013 and in a book 2015.

=== Novels ===
- Kralj svile, 2000, 2001. COBISS 102604300 (Maya Herman, "In Search of the Silk King", a novel, Xlibris, 2005, ISBN 1-4134-9118-9, Library of Congress 2005902697)
- Slike kojih nema, (Pictures not taken), 2009.
- U potrazi za Lolitom (Looking for Lolita), 2011. (new, changed "female" edition of the novel Slike kojih nema), English translation in preparation for publication COBISS 186611212
- Ma Belle, prva americka dama Srbije, 2015, Sluzbeni glasnik, Beograd ISBN 978-86-519-1965-0

=== Essays ===
- Skice za portrete (Sketches for Portraits) A collection of essays and conversations with colleagues and friends, American and international authors ranging from Joseph Brodsky to Bret Easton Ellis. ISBN 86-367-0558-4 COBISS 28091911
- Knjizevnost prestupa (Literuture of Transgression) First published in English as a series of essays in James Joyce Quarterly and European Studies Journal, then as doctoral dissertation ( The Fall of Hyperbaton: Parodic and Revisionary Strategies in Bely, Joyce, and Mann,...) ISBN 86-363-0240-4 COBISS 32331788
- Prozor u žadu, Prosveta 1994. A book of travel essays about travels through Thailand, Vietnam, Cambodia and Burma. ISBN 86-07-00851-X COBISS 31904524

It was published in English under pen name Maya Herman, The Jade Window (D.K Book House, Bangkok, London, 1998) ISBN 978-974-7457-03-2; Publisher Code: B0003/1998-2,000 The jade window: images from Southeast Asia

- Digitalna galaksija (Digital Galaxy), 2011. ISBN 978-86-7694-343-2 COBISS 186488332 a book of micro essays about the transition of our world from print to digital media.
- "Who was Nikola Tesla? The Genius who gave us Light" Zavod za udzbenike 2015, Belgrade, (ISBN 978-8617192974).

=== Other publications ===
Besides the books for adults, Maja Herman Sekulić published a book for children Slon Lala Tulipan, ili kako je otkriven porcelan with illustrations by Dobrosav Bob Zivkovic (Decje novine), and for English and German publications of Elephant Lala the Tulipe, or how porcelain was invented with illustrations by Sibille Schwarz; she also published a poem for children in English Lazar, the Lizard in a Blizzard (Waldo Tribune, Southampton, 2000). She wrote an introduction for a book of photography (Black Horse Book, New York) by the Italian photographer Marco Glaviano. She was a contributor to another book of photography Skin by distinguished French photographer Laurent Elie Badessi (Edition Stemmle, Zurich–New York). She closely collaborated with Italian theatre director Paolo Magelli on a dramaturgy of the longest running production in Belgrade Drama Theater of Harold and Maude, and did a Serbian adaptation of the life of the British author, Dame Rebecca West, which is awaiting its Serbian theatre production.
