= Azurée =

Perfume by Estée Lauder

Azurée is a leather/animalic chypre fragrance created in 1969 for Estée Lauder. Its name is French for "azure". Azurée was inspired by the Mediterranean warmth near Mrs. Estée Lauder's vacation home in Cap d'Antibes. It has top notes of basil, jasmine and citrus, middle notes of armoise, vetiver and rose, and base notes of patchouli, oakmoss and amber.
