= Marcel Marongiu =

French fashion designer

- Born: 9 February 1962; Paris, France
- Occupations: personal stylist, fashion designer
- Website: http://www.marcelmarongiu.paris

Marcel Marongiu (born 9 February 1962) is a French-Swedish fashion designer. He created his eponymous fashion design brand in 1991 in Paris, and was the artistic director of Guy Laroche from 2008 to 2015.

== Biography ==
Marcel Marongiu was born on February 9, 1962, in Paris. His father was a French engineer, and his mother a Swedish flight attendant. He studied at the Beaux-Arts de Paris but dropped out to pursue a career in fashion design. He studied modelism in Sweden, worked with the designer France Andrévie in Paris, and moved back to Sweden to present his first collection in 1989. He moved back to Paris in 1991 to launch his eponymous fashion design company, Maison Marcel Marongiu. In 1996, his company went bankrupt. He partnered with Japanese associates to relaunch, and opened two stores, in Paris and Tokyo. In 2006, he closed his eponymous brand after a conflict with his shareholders.

In November 2007, Marongiu became a consulting artistic director for Guy Laroche with the goal to reinvent the fabled brand in a similar way Hedi Slimane reinvented Yves Saint Laurent and Alexander Wang Balenciaga. In 2012, he signed a capsule collection with the mail order company 3 Suisses and was a jury on the Swedish version of the TV show Project Runway. In January 2015, he stepped down as artistic director of Guy Laroche, replaced by Adam Andrascik.

Since then, he has been a consultant for fashion brands and has been commissioned for interior design work.

== Style ==
Inspired by the iconic fashion of David Bowie, Marongiu also cited Claire McCardell (1905-1958) as a source of inspiration for stylish yet affordable clothes. In the 1990s, his women collections borrowed masculine clothing elements (cowboy hats, fitted suits over black satin shirts, fetish boots, double-breasted suits) to tough up femininity. He was also credited for exploring the reinvention of the chiton, giving a special attention to pleated patterns in his creations. At Guy Laroche, he developed more feminine modern looks with classic simplicity and new materials, attempting to develop a futurist tone that Thomas Adamson of Associated Press defined as "intergalactic". He also found inspiration in the works of contemporary architects such as Frank Gehry and Oscar Niemeyer.

== Filmography ==
- Marcel Marongiu/Se mettre sur son 31/Saké/Rouge, Tendance XXI (season 9, episode 17), TV5 Monde
