= Fidji (perfume) =

Perfume by Guy Laroche

Fragrance by
- Released: 1966
- Label: Guy Laroche

Fidji is a perfume by Guy Laroche, developed in 1966 by the perfumer Joséphine Catapano.

Fidji is named after the Fiji Islands in the South Pacific. It is composed of notes of galbanum, hyacinth, lemon, bergamot, rose, jasmine, violet, ylang-ylang, carnation, orris, musk, patchouli, sandalwood, amber, vetiver and oakmoss. The bottle was designed by the artist Serge Mansau and was the first women's perfume line for Guy Laroche.
