= Krasnaya Moskva =

Russian perfume

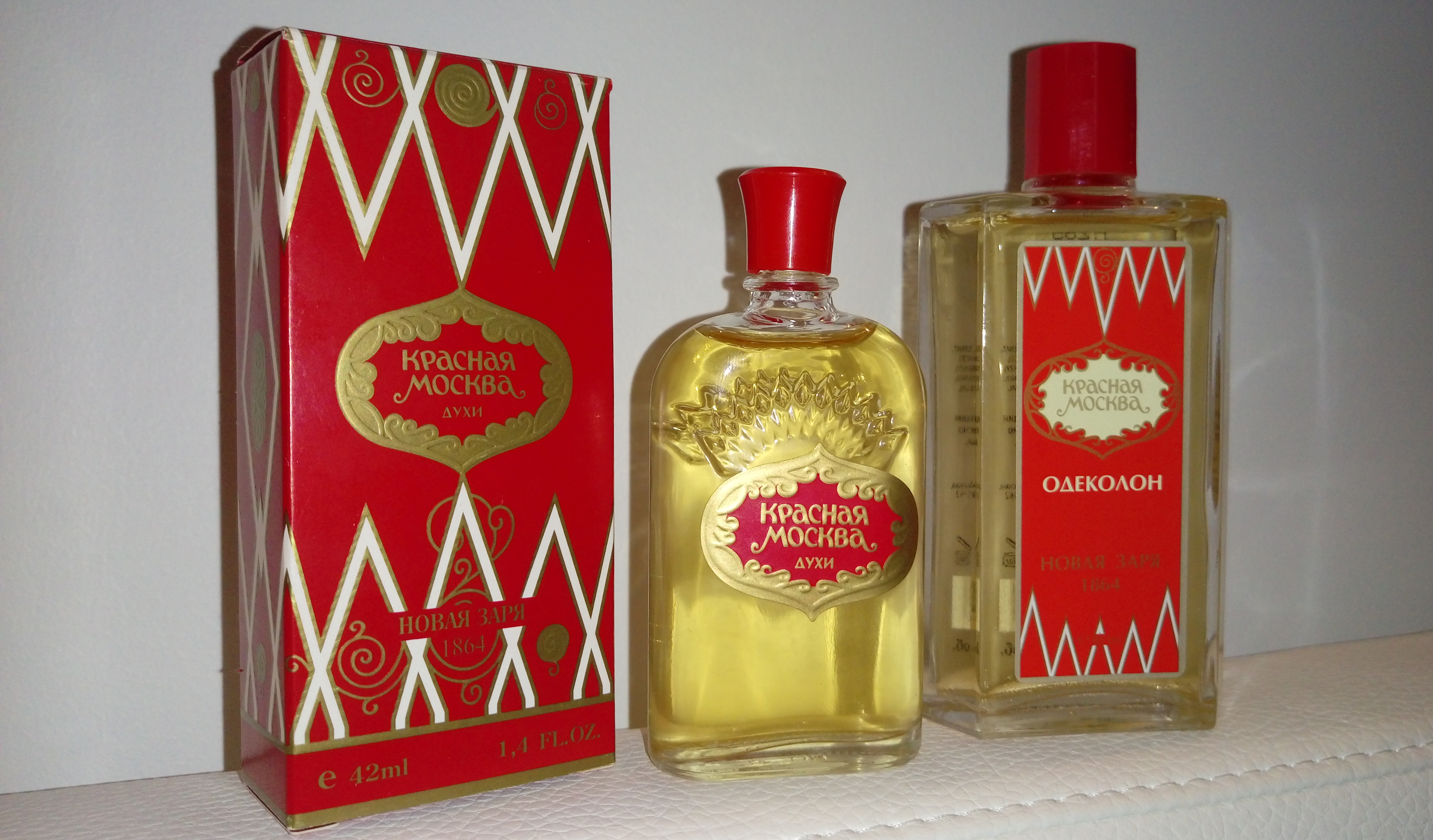

Krasnaya Moskva (Russian: Красная Москва, literally Red Moscow, figuratively Beautiful Moscow) was the first Soviet-created perfume.

The fragrance belongs to the class of chypre fragrances (sub-class "floral chypres") and contains more than 60 components, the official description of the perfume says: "A thin, warm, noble aroma with a tinge of orange blossom".

Rudolf Arkadyevich Friedman writes in his book "Perfumery", edition of 1955:

- "Krasnaya Moskva is associated with elegant warmth, playful and flirtatious languor, melodious, plastic melodiousness",
- "the perfume "Krasnaya Moskva", mainly representing the violet complex, are quite sentimental by smell, but due to the change of timbre and the introduction of a number of harmonizing substances, they received a special beauty and richness of smell",
- "the perfume "Krasnaya Moskva", consisting of a mixture of the bases of iris, violet, carnation for perfection (rounding) of all these primary materials and for enhancing their delicate smell, requires a significant proportion of jasmine essence".

== Popularity in the 20th century ==
Krasnaya Moskva became very popular and was widespread in the Soviet Union (partially due to limited competition in early USSR) and, after the Second World War, became popular throughout the Eastern Bloc.

In 1958, Krasnaya Moskva perfume received an award at the World Exhibition in Brussels.

=== Strength and sillage ===
KM's ubiquity during socialist era resulted in some notoriety: Krasnaya Moskva is somewhat notorious for the combination of:

1. Being widespread "back in the days";
2. Having long-lasting smell and enormous sillage compared to most modern perfumes, colognes and eau de toilettes;
3. Having no atomiser, no spray attached to the bottle (and it is not advisable to use excessively scented classic KM with one), as opposed to most bottles of modern perfumes. Since KM comes in "splash" bottles, an inexperienced user may accidentally overuse, over-apply KM, failing to enjoy the proper scent.
4. Being popular nowadays among people who have been using it for years or even decades (and who are accustomed to the scent of the fragrance); being popular among people of old age (with weakened ability to sense smells); or both (due to the fragrance's fanbase aging).

== Nowadays and availability ==
Renata Litvinova describes KM as "sugary, concentrated... giving rise to a feeling of normal healthy nostalgia".

The fragrance and its design survived the fall of the Soviet Union: KM is produced to this day by the same Novaya Zarya factory, located in the Danilovsky District, Moscow; and it still comes in "oldschool" (albeit slightly redesigned) 42ml "splash" bottles (e.g. bottles without atomisers) with tiny bottlenecks; As for 2020 prices, one 42ml bottle of classic Krasnaya Moskva is available in Novaya Zarya's boutiques for around 800 RUB.

=== Flankers and eau de cologne form ===
In 2010's, KM also comes in eau de cologne form, sold in hexagonal-shaped 85ml bottles with wider bottle neck (also "splash" bottle type). Its price (as low as 111 RUB for 85 ml bottle in 2020) and the specific smell caused by its alcohol base without stabilization (which is common for cheap eau de colognes) is often misleading in terms of qualities of original KM.

- ~2$/bottle colognes by Novaya Zarya are supposed to be "hygiene lotions" rather than full-pledged perfumes in general. Examples of other colognes: "Futbol 2018", "Kommandor" or "Dlay Muzchin" pour homme "lotions" from Novaya Zarya can only be found in "cheap cologne" form. However, other eau de colognes, like "Sportclub" and "Consul", also come in variants of higher scent oil content and bolder smell in bigger and more expensive bottles.

Novaya Zarya also produces a flanker of KM since 2018: КМ Лайт, "Krasnaya Moskva Light".

== Origins ==
Krasnaya Moskva's origins are disputed to the point of creating urban legends:

1. It may date from before the Russian Revolution of 1917 as Le Bouquet Préféré de l'Impératrice (The Empress’ Favorite Bouquet’), a fragrance created in Henri Brocard's factory in 1913 (and later given a Russian name);
2. or it may have been created in 1925, after Brocard's factory was nationalized and renamed Novaya Zarya in 1922;
3. Krasnaya Moskva was created by perfumer Auguste Michel and reformulated after The October Revolution.
