= Laurent Elie Badessi =

American photographer

- Born: November 27, 1964 (age 61)
- Occupations: Photographer and Artist

Laurent Elie Badessi (born November 27, 1964, in Avignon, France) is a French American photographer and artist based in New York City and Paris.

Badessi frequently uses symbolism, mythology, and historical and cultural references in his work.

The study of trust that develops between the photographer and the sitter and the exploration of the power of the photographic medium on people, are both fundamental vectors in his artistic quest.

His photographs often addresses subtle and relevant questions on social, political and cultural issues, such as the relationship with nudity, religion, the environment, war or the fragility of life.

He is a fourth-generation photographer.

== Early life ==
Badessi the son of French photographer Elie Badessi and Catalan Maria Louisa Rovira Font was raised in France.

Badessi was first interested in painting and filmmaking, but he chose photography as his chief form of artistic expression. While studying language and communication sciences with a focus on journalism and advertising at the Université des Lettres in Avignon, he experimented with photography. He spent hours taking photos of people and soon, started to draw attention to his work by winning prestigious photography contests such as the Guy Laroche Drakkar Prize.

Before moving to Paris, Badessi's first noteworthy photograph was published in Paris's Vogue Hommes magazine. The black-and-white portrait was exhibited as part of the Condé Nast retrospective at the Centre Photographique et d'Audiovisuel de la Ville de Paris (1986), along with photographs by Irving Penn, Bruce Weber, Helmut Newton, Guy Bourdin, and Annie Leibovitz that had been taken throughout the years for the company's various prestigious titles.

== Early career ==
Badessi became fascinated with the interaction that develops between the photographer and the sitter during a photo session, as well as the psychological impact of the photography medium on the sitter. To deepen his study of these two observations, he decided to move to Paris in the mid-1980s and enrolled in a class of photography at the Université de Paris VIII. For his Master thesis, he created a project entitled "Ethnological Fashion Photography" whose focus was to study the impact of photography on a relatively unexplored terrain, using clothing as the main communication tool with his subjects. Using the method of "La photographie négociées" (Negotiated Photography) introduced to him by photographer/teacher Michel Séméniako, Badessi, spent several months over the course of two years (1987–1988), in Niger, Africa, taking photographs and studying the impact of the medium on isolated tribes, that had never or very rarely been exposed to photography. He was able to finance this project thanks to the prominent "Bourse de l'aventure" prize that he won (1988), which was funded by several sponsors including Fuji Color, VSD magazine, and France Inter.

Badessi's well-polished and unique images began to appear frequently in photography magazines and exhibitions. Before long he was hired to create images to advertise high-end fashion brands and perfumes. These commercial assignments enabled Badessi to have a steady income at an early age, and to pursue his artistic quest to explore the photographic medium around the world.

== Career ==
To expend his career, Badessi moved to the United States in the early 1990s. Dividing his time between commercial and personal work, he began focusing on artistic nudes, which he had already experimented with during his early stages behind the camera. Since nude work requires the deepest degree of trust between the photographer and the sitter, he felt that this phase was necessary to further evaluate the psychological impact of photography on people.

Badessi has always been spiritually close to nature. Before the organic products trend, he was well aware that we should respect our environment because we are part of it. He believes that whatever we do badly to nature will come back to us at some point. In between assignments and with this philosophy in mind, Badessi dedicated ten years taking nudes in dramatic landscapes, showing how close we are to nature. In 2000, the prestigious Swiss publishing company Edition Stemmle, released his first book, SKIN, which featured a foreword written by Sondra Gilman, Founder and chairperson of the photography committee at the Whitney Museum in New York. A few solo shows presenting some of this work had previously taken place in Paris, but in the years to follow the publication of the book, more exhibitions opened in the United States and abroad. At the same time, his photographs became part of numerous important collections and he received several prestigious awards and grants.

During this transitional phase of his career, Badessi decided to focus on the fine art aspects of photography and only accepted commercial assignments that would grant him total control over the images. The campaign he produced for Charles Jourdan (2004) is the perfect example of Badessi's desire to create and nurture an image from its concept to its final phase. The success of the Charles Jourdan project was a great challenge, because for two decades, Guy Bourdin had generated a large amount of stunning photographs for the brand that have become iconic images. To bring his own vision, Badessi played with eroticism and mythological symbolism, creating memorable visuals that are in the permanent collection of le Musée de la Publicité – Les Arts Décoratifs in Paris. That same year, one of the photographs "The Abduction of Ganymede 1" made the headlines for an article in The New York Times.

Focusing on his artistic undertakings considerably boosted Badessi's desire to get closer and closer to total artistic freedom.

Badessi created "American Dream, This is not a dream" (2006) a series of portraits based on the propagandist campaigns elaborated in the United States to attract new recruits during the Iraq War. The project was acclaimed abroad and widely collected, but seen as too controversial in the United-States at the time because of the tense relationship between many military families and the Government, as a result, the series was not widely exhibited in its homeland. "American Dream, This is not a dream" was later selected for the prestigious Arte Laguna Prize and shown at the Venice Arsenal (2011).

"Age of Innocence, Children and Guns in the USA" (2016–2019) Over nearly 4 years, Badessi produced a series of portraits to document the emotional and sociological relationship between children and guns in the USA.This exploration of gun culture involved capturing portraits of children and teenagers across different states, each posing with their firearms—some real, some toys. This difference reflects whether they come from gun enthusiast families or households without such inclinations. During the photo sessions, I always asked a simple question to the children: "What do you like about guns?" Their response accompany their respective portrait, providing insight into their perspectives. Some photographs from this series have been exhibited in galleries, photo festivals and museums, including La Bibliothèque Nationale de France in Paris, Les Rencontres Internationales de la Photographie in Arles, the National Portrait Gallery in London, The Musée de la Photographie in Lille, Fr., Contemporary Art Center in Dali, China, La Maison Caillebotte Museum in Yerres, France, The National Arts Club in New York and several other places. A book of this series was published by Images Plurielles in 2020 with an introduction by sociologist Jennifer Carlson.

== Exhibitions ==
Badessi has had solo exhibitions in New York, Los Angeles, Boston, Miami, London, Milan, Rome, Paris, Nice, Barcelona, Monaco. Selected solo exhibitions include "Age of Innocence" National Arts Club, New York (2021). "Age of Innocence" Photographic Nights of Pierrevert, France (2020). "Age of Innocence" Art Trope Gallery in collaboration with Polka Galerie, Paris (2020). "Guns" Polka Galerie, Paris (2019). "Age of Innocence" Gallifet Art Center, Aix-en-Provence, France (2019). "Voilà" – "Age of Innocence" Le Parcours de l’art 24th Edition, Théatre Benoit XII, Avignon, France (2018). "Fragments of Innocence" Blank Space Gallery, New York (2015). Selected group exhibitions include "Women on view" Frauen Museum Wiesbaden, Germany (2020). "La belleza de las lineas" Master pieces from the Gilman & González-Falla Photography Collection, Fundación Foto Colectania, Barcelona, Spain (2019). "La beauté des lignes" Master pieces from the Gilman & González-Falla Photography Collection, Propriété Caillebotte, Yerres, France (2018). "Fragilités" – Age of Innocence" La Bourse du Talent, Maison de la Photographie, Lille, France (2018). "The Beauty of Lines" Master pieces from the Gilman & González-Falla Photography Collection, Musée de l’Elysée, Lausanne, Switzerland (2018). "Fragilités" – "Age of Innocence" La Bourse du Talent, Bibliothèque Nationale de France, François Mitterrand, Paris (2017). "Age of Innocence" Taylor Wessing Photography Portrait Prize, National Portrait Gallery, London (2017). "Fragilités" – "Age of Innocence" La Bourse du Talent France, Dali, China (2017). "La nuit de l’année" – "Age of Innocence" Rencontres Internationales de la Photographie, Arles, France (2017). "Trees in Focus" Anne Fontaine Foundation, Sotheby's, Paris (2014). "Cloud 9" The Sultan Gallery in collaboration with Dean Project, Doha, Qatar (2013). "Trees in Focus" Anne Fontaine Foundation, Sotheby's, New York (2013). "Shared Vision", The Sondra Gilman & Celso Gonzales-Falla Collection of photography, Aperture Gallery, New York (2012). "Mirrors of the magic muse" Foundation Ekaterina, Moscow (2012). "Shared Vision", The Sondra Gilman & Celso Gonzalez-Falla Collection, Museum of Contemporary Art, Jacksonville, Florida (2011). "Il Dibbio della bellezza" The Gibelli Collection, Museo Palazzo Te, Mantua, Italy (2011). "Arte Laguna Prize" Fifth edition, Arsenale, Venice, Italy (2011). "Icons" Laurent Elie Badessi & Andres Serrano, Salamatina Gallery, Manhasset, New York (2010). "American Dream" Galerie Adler, Paris (2009). "Whole in The Wall" Helenbeck Gallery, New York (2009). "Exorcisms" The Steps Gallery, London (2009). "American Dream" Bertin-Toublanc Gallery, Art Basel, Miami (2008). "Laurent Elie Badessi" Galerie Helenbeck, Paris (2007). "Victim" Galerie Helenbeck, Group Exhibition, Paris. France (2006). "American Dream" Art +, Art Basel, Miami (2006). "Color Generations" Tepper Takayama Fine Arts, Boston (2005). "Celebrating Diversity" UN Pavilion, Aichi, Japan (2005). "HPA" Guangzhou, China (2004). "New Acquisitions" The Danforth Museum of Art, Framingham, Massachusetts, US (2004)."Skin" Spazio Étoile, Cesare Serono Foundation, Rome (2004). "Skin" Casa Battlo, Barcelona (2003). "Ethnik" Art House, Dubai. UAE (2003). "Go Figure, Manifestation of the Human Form in Contemporary Art" Turchin Center for the Visual Arts, Boone, North Carolina, US (2003). "Art Garden Fantasy" Maruani & Noirhome, Knokke-Zout, Belgium (2003). "Skin" Lacoste Castle, Pierre Cardin, Lacoste, France (2001). "NYC/DXB" (P.O.V), International Modern Gallery, Emirates Towers, Dubai, UAE (2001). "Skin" Galleria del Cortile & Academica di Costume, Rome (2000). "Skin" Stephen Cohen Gallery, Los Angeles (2000). "Skin" Il Diaframma, Lattuada Studio, Milan (2000). "Skin" Cristinerose Gallery, New York (2000)

== Collections and awards ==
Badessi's work is featured in prominent collections such as The Whitney Museum New York, The Sondra Gilman and Celso Gonzales-Falla Collection, The Buhl Collection, The Elton John Collection, La Bibliothèque Nationale de France, Le Musée de l'Elysée Lausanne, The Danforth Museum of Art, Dr. Pier-Luigi Gibelli Collection, The Jorge Perez Collection, Musée de la Publicité – Les Arts Décoratifs Paris, Barry Diller, Pierre Cardin, Karl Lagerfeld among others.

Badessi has received several grants and awards. One of the most prestigious is a grant from the French Ministry of Culture for his exhibition "Metamorphoses" held at L’Espace V.E.G.A. Pierre Cardin in Paris. La Bourse du talent "Age of Innocence" France (2017). Hasselblad Award, Sweden "American Dream project" (2011).

== Family history ==
Badessi's father's side of the family has had an interesting history in fine arts and photography. His great-grandfather, Cesare Badessi, was an Italian artist who specialized in fresco painting. To explore the "New World", he moved to Brazil where some of his relatives had emigrated from Italy. For several years, he decided to put painting on the side to take part in the family business, which spanned from banking to coffee exploitations and diamond mining. To resume his painting career, he moved back to Europe and started to practice photography in the late part of the 1800s. At the time, photography was a fairly new medium and was promising to become the alternative to painting. It was starting to open portraiture to an entirely new audience. With a prominent banker as business partner, he opened a photo studio in one of the most fashionable streets of Lisbon, Portugal where he took portraits of the well to do.

Miguel Angelo Badessi (Laurent Elie Badessi's grandfather), son of Cesare Badessi, was born in Porto in 1904. In 1923, the entire family moved to Paris, France, for political reasons. There were 10 siblings in the Badessi family and all pursued careers in painting, sculpture or photography. Miguel Angelo Badessi was 19 years old when he arrived in Paris and quickly picked up the art of photography, as he wanted the follow the footsteps of his father and his older siblings. In 1924, at the age of 20, he started to work as a photographer for one of the most important photo studios of the time, Manuel Frères. Later on, he worked in several of the other prestigious Parisian photo studios Lorelle, Saad, and Piaz that mainly focused on high fashion, celebrities and movie stars.

It was at Studio Piaz in the late 1930s that he met his future wife Raymonde Feugère a photographer who was the daughter of photographer Jules Feugère. While working at Studios Manuel Frères, Raymonde Feugère met Germaine Hirschefeld, known as Cosette Harcourt, who was taking care of the appointments for sittings of the celebrities. Cosette Harcourt created the Studio Harcourt in 1934 with the brothers Lacroix. They hired a part of the Manuel Frères team and Raymonde Badessi joined the newly opened studio, which quickly became extremely famous for celebrity portraiture.

Miguel Angelo Badessi and Raymonde Badessi were married in 1938 while working together at Studio Piaz. Shortly after, they opened their own studio in the XIV arrondissement of Paris. They had one son Elie Badessi (Laurent Elie Badessi's father) who was born in Paris in 1942. He became also a photographer and worked in the family business. In 1957, looking to escape the fast-paced Parisian lifestyle, the Badessis acquired the renowned establishments Studios Châteauneuf and settled in the south of France.

== Works ==
- ISBN 9782919436316
- Age of Innocence, Children and Guns in the USA Images Plurielles Editions (2020)
- Anders Dyhr Light, Sir (May 21, 2013) Xamou Art magazine
- Helene Martinez Laurent Elie Badessi, révélateur universaliste du sensible (November 5, 2009) Artistik Rezo
- Joyce Wadler Of Course, as a Predator He Can Name His Price (Dec 14 2004) New York Times
- Remi Onabanjo Focusing on the Photographers: Laurent Elie Badessi (February, 4th, 2013) Anne Fontaine Foundation
- ISBN 3908163145 SKIN Laurent ELie Badessi
- Antipilipseis magazine Laurent Elie Badessi issue No. 24
- Cloud 9 Art Kuwait magazine (May, 1st, 2013)
- Mirrors of the Magic Muse Riviera Excellence (May 2, 2013)
- Paint in Art Basel Washington Life magazine (Feb 2009)
