= Soredium =

Reproductive structures of lichens

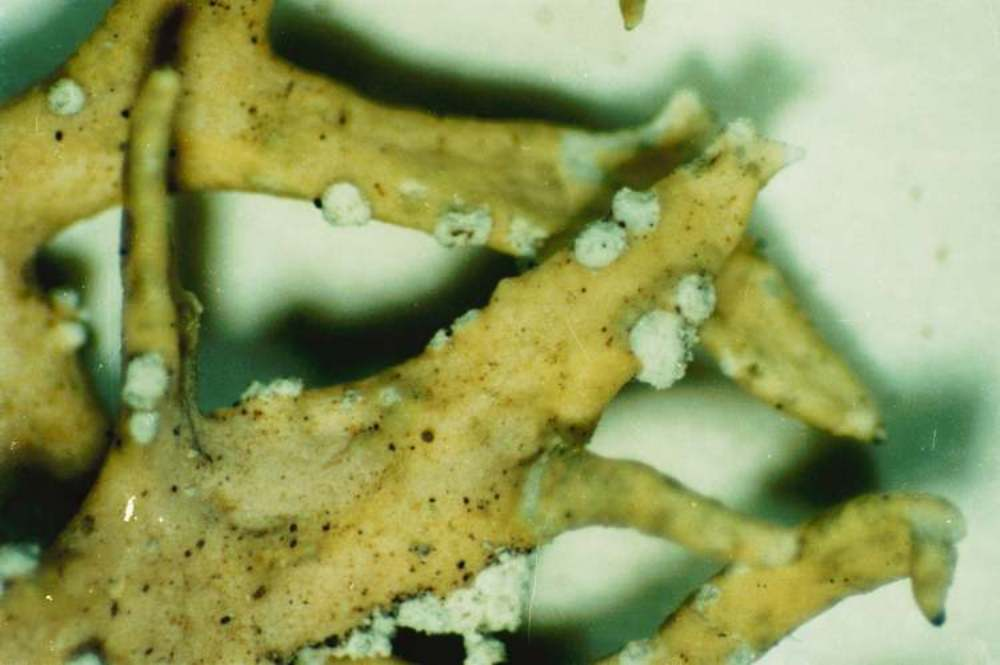
Soredia on Evernia prunastri

Soredia are common reproductive structures of lichens. Lichens reproduce asexually by employing simple fragmentation and production of soredia and isidia. Soredia are powdery propagules composed of fungal hyphae wrapped around cyanobacteria or green algae. These can be either scattered diffusely across the surface of the lichen's thallus, or produced in localized structures called soralia. Fungal hyphae make up the basic body structure of a lichen. The soredia are released through openings in the upper cortex of the lichen structure. After their release, the soredia disperse to establish the lichen in a new location.
