= Fougère =

One of the main olfactive families of perfumes

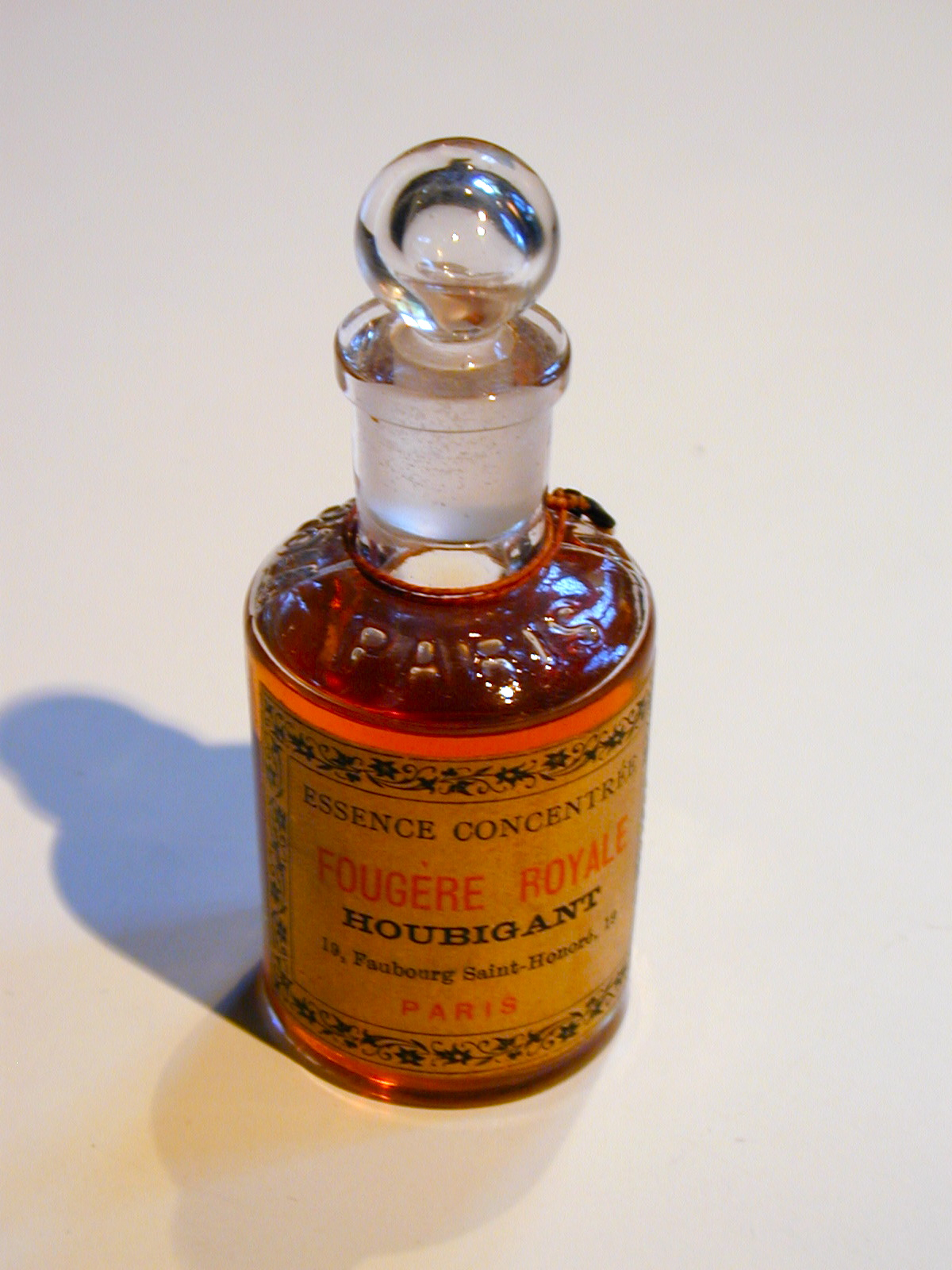
An original bottle of Fougère Royale by Houbigant, created by the perfumer Paul Parquet in 1882

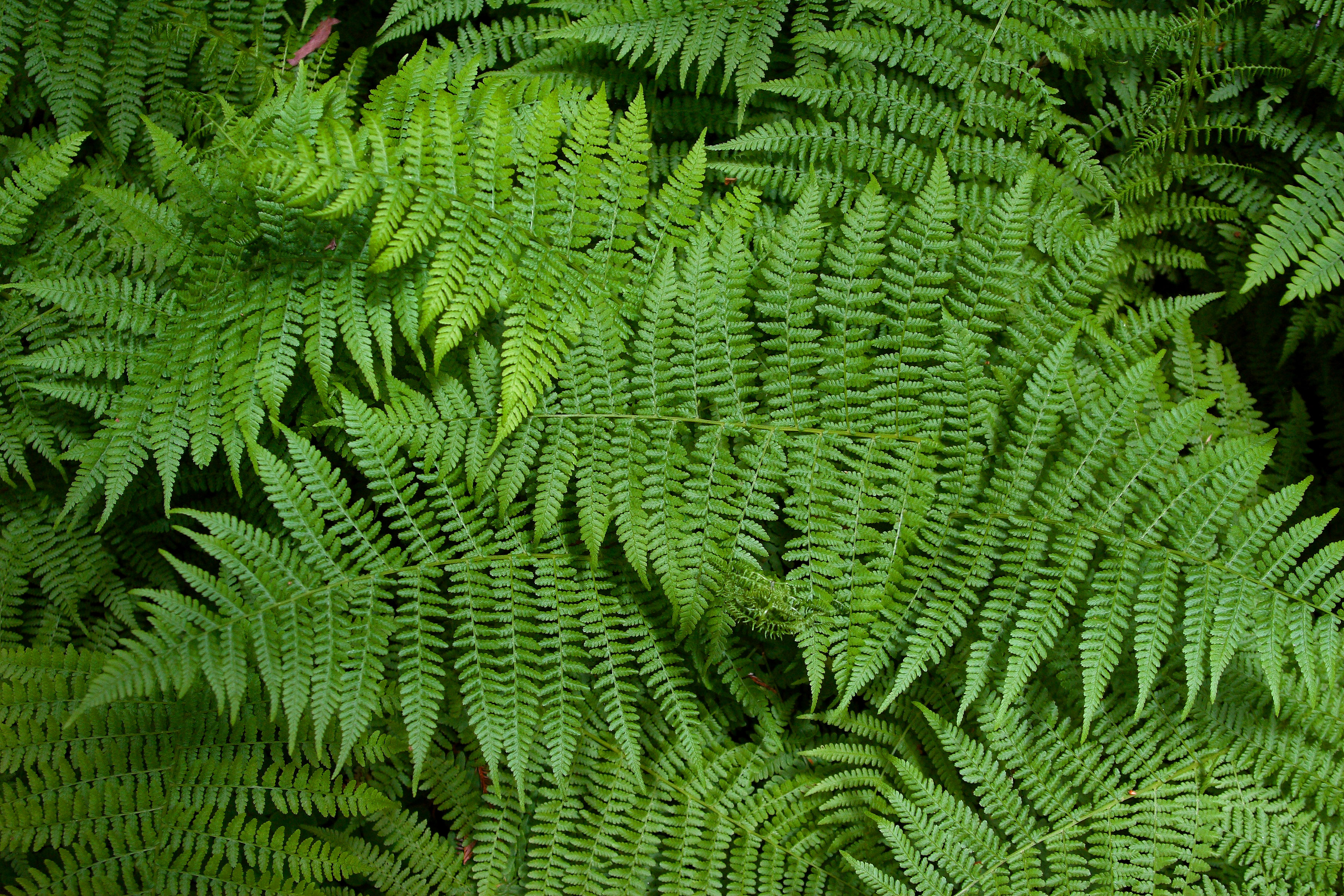
Fougère means "fern" in French.

Fougère, pronounced [fu.ʒɛʁ], is one of the main olfactive families of perfumes. The name comes from the French language word for "fern". Fougère perfumes are made with a blend of fragrances: top-notes are sweet, with the scent of lavender flowers; as the more volatile components evaporate, the scents of oakmoss, derived from a species of lichen and described as woody, sharp and slightly sweet, and coumarin, similar to the scent of new-mown hay, become noticeable. Aromatic fougère, a derivative of this class, contains additional notes of herbs, spice and/or wood.

The name originated with Houbigant Parfum's Fougère Royale. This perfume, created by Houbigant owner Paul Parquet in 1882, was later added to the scent archives known as the Osmothèque, in Versailles, France. Houbigant re-introduced this fragrance in 2010.

Perfumes of this type are especially popular as fragrances for men. Many modern fougère perfumes have various citrus, herbaceous, green, floral and animalic notes included. The most common additions to the basic fragrance blend include vetiver and geranium. Bergamot is often present to add sharpness to the lavender top-note.

Examples of men's fragrances which fall into the fougère class include Sartorial by Penhaligon's, Brut by Fabergé, Paco Rabanne Pour Homme, Azzaro Pour Homme, Boss by Hugo Boss, Prada for Men, Eternity for Men by Calvin Klein, Canoe for Men by Dana, Dolce & Gabbana Pour Homme, Drakkar Noir by Guy Laroche, Tabac for Men, Michael for Men by Michael Kors, Clubman Pinaud After Shave and Special Reserve, Polo Green and Chaps by Ralph Lauren, Kouros by Yves Saint Laurent, Bracken Man by Amouage, and English Blazer by Yardley London.

Lately a lot of companies started selling unisex and female fougère fragrances, e.g. Libre by Yves Saint Laurent and Coffee Break by Maison Margiela.

== Etymology ==
The English term fougère comes from the French word for "fern". It was first used to refer to perfume in 1882 with the release of Fougère Royale by Houbigant. The French term was inherited from Old French fulgiere, which, in turn, originates from the Vulgar Latin filicaria and Classical Latin filix.

== History ==
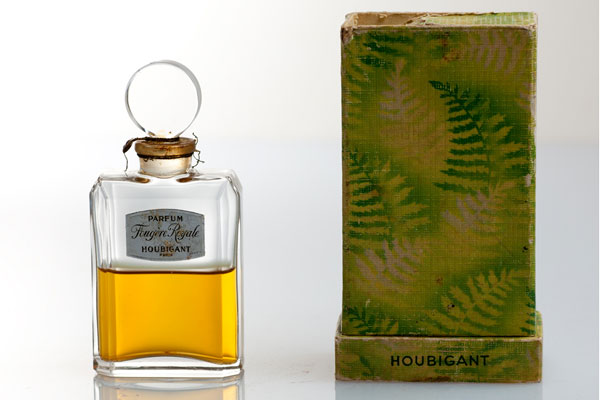
Bottle and packaging of Fougère Royale by Houbigant

The fougère genre was established in 1882 with the creation of Fougère Royale for Houbigant. Fougère Royale, composed by perfumer Paul Parquet, is considered one of the first modern perfumes for its usage of synthetic aromachemicals. A key component of Fougère Royale was coumarin, a compound with a sweet, haylike scent, which had been recently synthesized in 1868. Initially formulated as a women's fragrance, like most perfumes of the time, Fougère Royale quickly gained popularity among male consumers, particularly dandies and refined urban men, who were drawn to its familiar barbershop notes of woods and lavender. One of its earliest and most prominent users, Guy de Maupassant, praised it in a letter to Maurice de Fleury, writing:

Respirez la Fougère Royale [...] et vous me direz qu'il y a une prodigieuse évocation des forêts ou des landes, non de leur flore mais de leur verdure.

[Smell Fougère Royale [...] and you will tell me there is a prodigious evocation of forests or moorlands, not of their flora but of their greenery.]

— Guy de Maupassant, a letter to Marice de Fleury

While Fougère Royale was discontinued in the 1950s, its central accord of oakmoss, coumarin, and lavender would be re-used and adapted into many other fragrances. (Note: Fougère Royale has been relaunched twice: unsuccessfully in 1988, and modernized by perfumer Rodrigo Flores‐Roux in 2010.) A notable early example is Jicky, released in 1889, making it the oldest perfume in continuous production. Composed by Aimé Guerlain, Jicky incorporated synthetic vanillin and coumarin into the fougère accord, along with prominent notes of citrus, rose, jasmine, orris, vetiver, civet, and benzoin; together, these form an abstract composition—a radical departure from the established style of the late 19th century, which preferred realistic evocations of particular flowers.

Unusually, the fougère accord was first developed for soaps before being adapted to fine fragrance. Fougère was also used to scent cosmetics and toiletries, although its popularity for this purpose has declined since its height.

Synthetic fragrance chemistry would continue to develop in the coming years. The 1898 creation of Trèfle Incarnat introduced isoamyl salicylate (described by Georges Darzens as smelling of "a blossoming clover field in the warmth of August") to the fougère skeleton.

== See also ==
- Perfume
- List of perfumes
