= Robert Bienaimé =

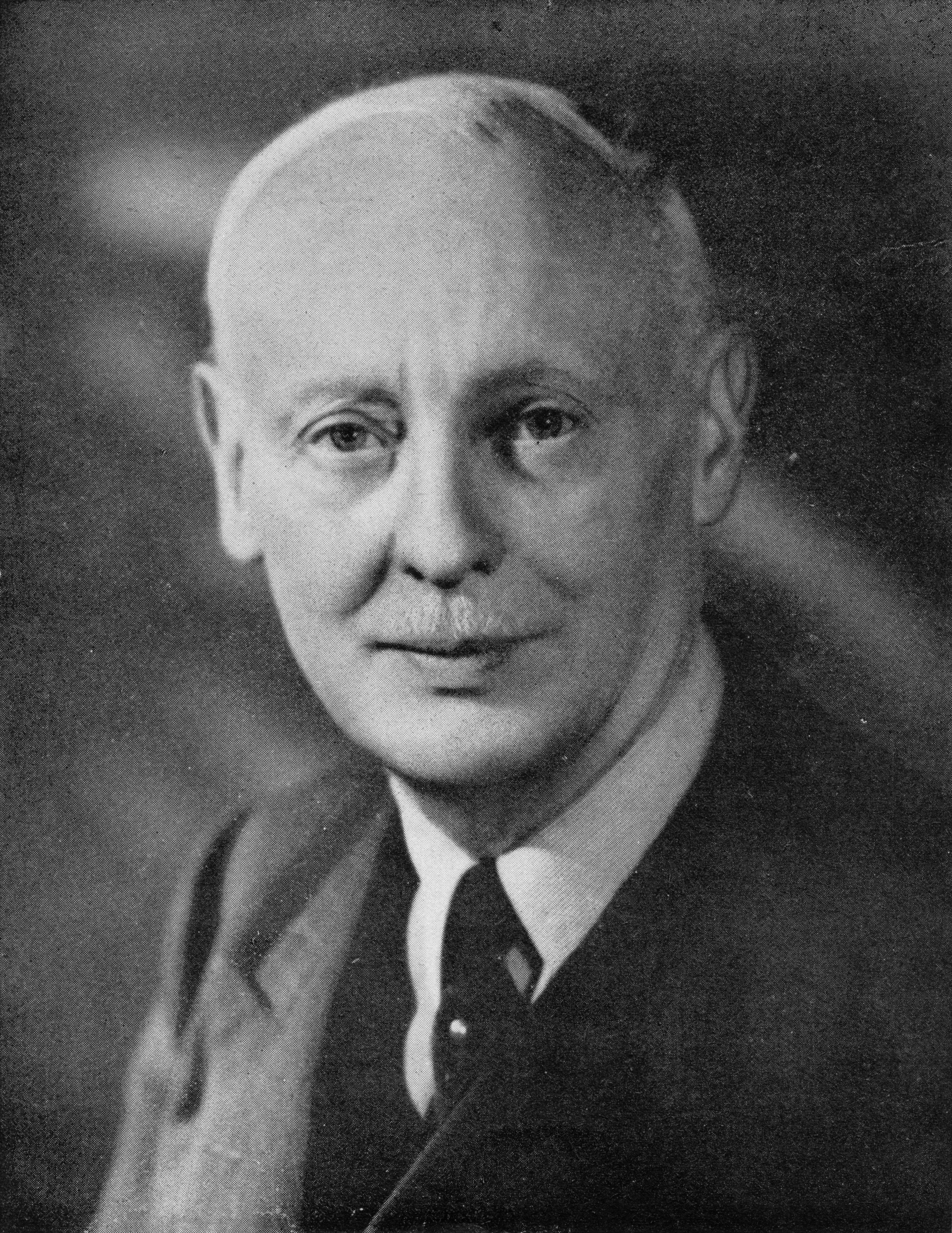
Bienaimé

Robert Bienaimé (15 March 1876 – 12 October 1960) was a French perfumer, notable for his work at Houbigant.

Bienaimé was born in the 8th arrondissement of Paris and became a perfumer early in life. About 1910, he joined Houbigant, then under the control of Paul Parquet, remaining there until 1935, and created several well-known fragrances for the company. One was Lilac, taking its scent only from that flower. Another, launched in 1910, was Quelques Fleurs, which mixed several flowers and became one of Houbigant's best sellers of all time, continuing to be on sale until the present time.

In 1935, Bienaimé left Houbigant to establish his own business, called Parfum de Bienaimé, and his own name was attached to his scents. Its fragrances were still in production in the early 1940s, but the house went under during the later 1940s.

Bienaimé died at Neuilly-sur-Seine in 1960.

== Some scents created ==
- Lilac, for Houbigant
- 'Quelques Fleurs, for Houbigant (1910)
- Eveil (1935)
- Fleurs D'Eté (1935)
- La Vie en Fleurs (1935)
- Vermeil (1935)
- Sur les Aimes (1935)
- Cuir de Russie (1935)
- Caravan (1936)
- Fleurs de Provence (1937)
- Les Carnations (1943)
- Dentelle (1948)
- Jours Heureux (1949)
- Enfin Jeuls (1949)
