= Houbigant Parfum =

Perfume manufacturer founded in Paris, France, in 1775

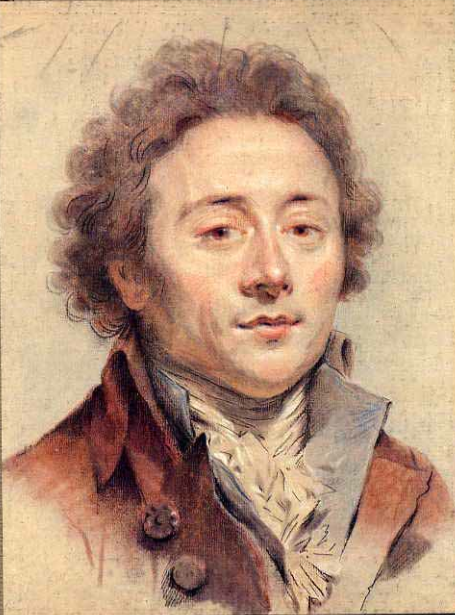
Jean-François Houbigant, as portrayed in the company's 150th anniversary catalog

Houbigant Parfum (pronounced [ubiɡɑ̃]) is a perfume manufacturer founded in Paris, France, in 1775 by Jean-François Houbigant of Grasse (1752–1807). The brand originally sold gloves, perfumes, and bridal bouquets. The original shop, À la Corbeille de Fleurs, operated at 19 rue du Faubourg Saint-Honoré. Several European rulers including Napoleon, Napoleon III, Alexander III of Russia, and Queen Victoria used Houbigant's perfume.

== History ==
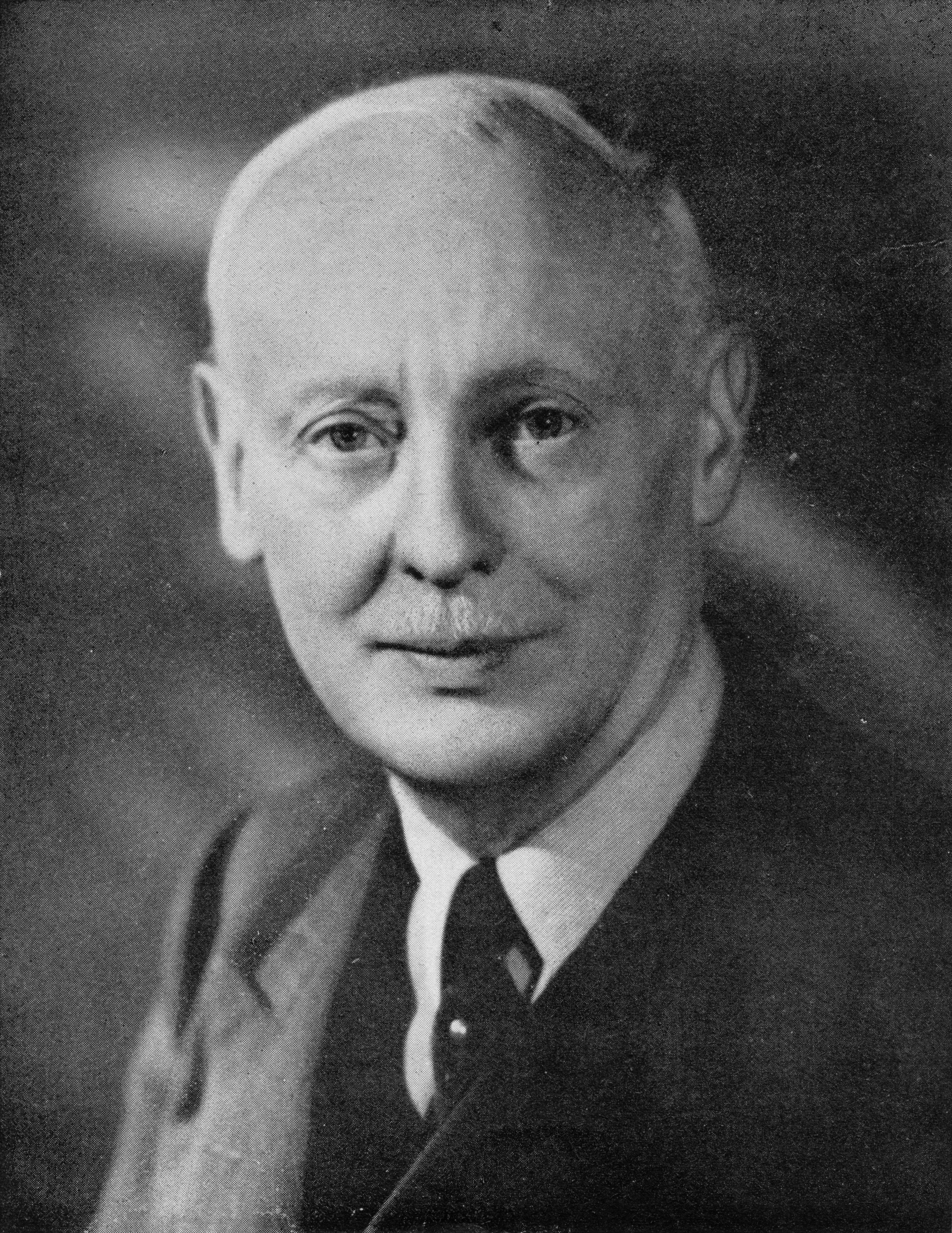
Robert Bienaimé, Houbigant perfumer from 1912 to 1935 and creator of Quelques Fleurs

In 1882, the House launched Fougère Royale, the first fougère (or 'fern-like') perfume, and established a new fragrance family. During this period, under the direction of the Paris office, offices were established in the United States, England, Belgium, the Netherlands, Switzerland, Italy, Spain, Poland, and Romania. The New York location included a manufacturing and distribution facility.

Houbigant was the first perfume house to discover how to isolate particular molecules from natural raw materials—specifically coumarin, which is isolated from the tonka bean. In 1912, they introduced Quelques Fleurs, the first multi-floral bouquet. Up to that time, floral fragrances had been mostly single flowers or were blended with herbs and other essences. The Genealogy of Perfumes cites Quelques Fleurs as an innovation that established a new fragrance classification and influenced other compositions for years afterward, including many of today’s important fragrances.

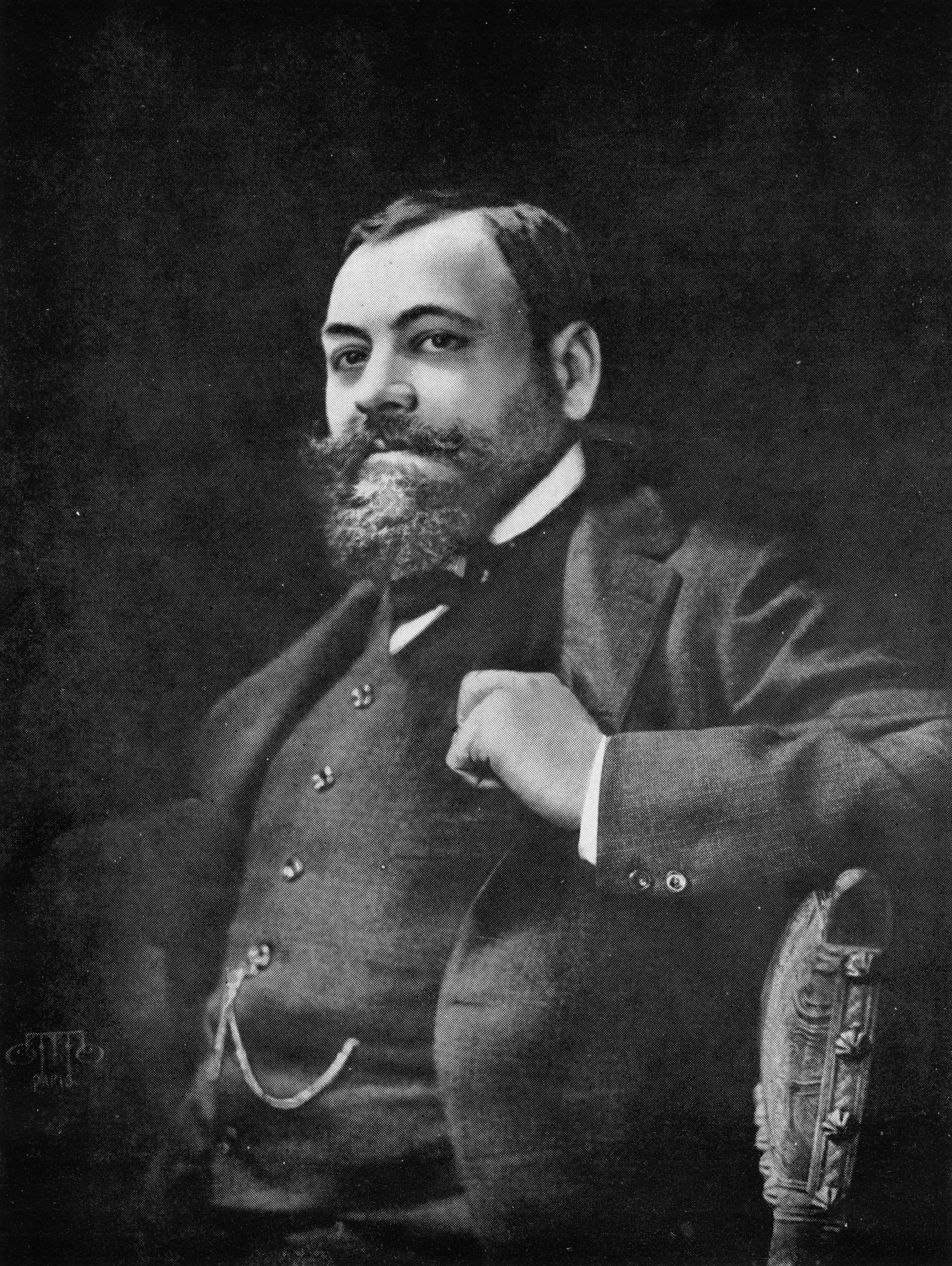
Paul Parquet, creator of Fougère Royale which created the eponymous Fougère family of fragrances

The Houbigant factory was bombed during the Second World War. The brand later produces some mildly successful fragrances, though later discontinued.

In 1993, Houbigant filed for chapter 11 bankruptcy protection in New York, with liabilities of US$52.5 million and assets of US$23 million. In 1994, Houbigant licensed twelve Houbigant perfumes, with their formulas and the Houbigant name, to a start-up company, Renaissance Cosmetics, Inc., which stated that its intention was to market via drug store chains and discounters, rather than maintain Houbigant's market position.

Renaissance filed for bankruptcy protection in 1999, preceded by much litigation between the companies, with Houbigant complaining that its perfumes were being "watered down", and its name used in ways not included in the licensing agreement. Houbigant later litigated with Renaissance's insurers over the claims. Renaissance ceased to exist, and perfumes far from their original formulations were legally sold under the Houbigant name. A company called "New Dana Perfumes", later "Dana Classic Fragrances", ended up with the legal right to use the "Houbigant" name for fragrances they manufactured themselves; Houbigant no longer tried to enforce compliance with the originals. It was reported in 2017 that the Houbigant perfumes were being manufactured under the original specifications by LOFT Fashion and Beauty Diffusion of Monaco.

== Current status ==
The Houbigant fragrances are now manufactured under the original specifications by LOFT Fashion and Beauty Diffusion of Monaco and marketed in the United States by Exclusive Fragrances and Cosmetics.

== Timeline ==
- 1775: Perfumer Jean-François Houbigant opens À la Corbeille de Fleurs, Rue Faubourg St Honoré
- 1807: Perfumer Armand-Gustave Houbigant, the son of Jean-François, joins the house
- 1807: Houbigant was appointed personal perfumer to Napoleon and created a special perfume for Empress Josephine
- Early 19th century: Houbigant was appointed as perfumer to Princess Adelaide d'Orléans, mother of King Louis-Philippe.
- 1838: The French house was awarded the license of "Perfumer to Her Majesty, Queen Victoria of the United Kingdom".
- 1880: perfumer Paul Parquet became joint owner.
- 1882: Paul Parquet creates Fougère Royale.
- 1890: Tsar Alexander III named Houbigant perfumer to the Imperial Court of Russia
- 1912: Perfumer Robert Bienaimé joined Houbigant and created fragrances for the house until he founded his own in 1935.
- 1912: Robert Bienaimé introduced Quelques Fleurs.
- pre-1950: perfumers Paul Schving and Marcel Billot created perfumes for Houbigant.
- 1990: Houbigant relaunched Lutece from prestige department store brand to domestic brand.
- 1980s: Houbigant relaunched Quelques Fleurs.
- 1985: Houbigant launched Duc de Vervins.
- 1998: Houbigant launched Quelques Fleurs Royale.
- 2010: Houbigant relaunched Fougère Royale.
- 2012: Houbigant launched Orangers en Fleurs.
- 2023: Houbigant launched Ambre des Abysses.
