= Paul Parquet =

French perfumer (1856-1916)

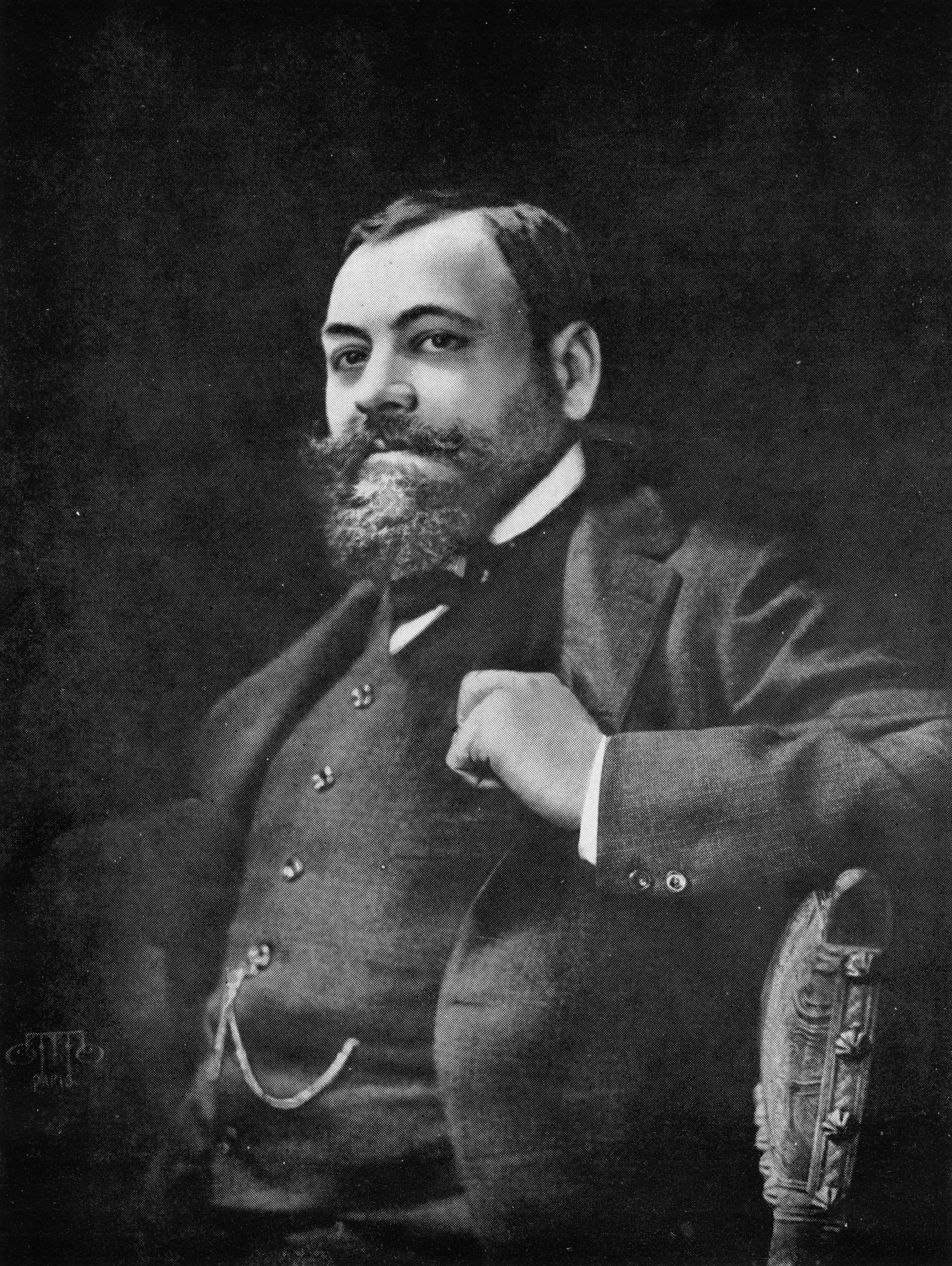
- Paul Parquet Portrait
- Born: 1856; France
- Died: 1916 (aged 59–60)
- Occupations: Perfumer, businessman
- Known for: Founder of modern perfumery

Paul Parquet (1856–1916) was a French perfumer and joint owner of Houbigant. Called the "greatest perfumer of his time" by Ernest Beaux, he is widely regarded as the founder of modern perfumery for having pioneered the use of synthetics in works such as Fougère Royale. His bestselling perfume, Le Parfum Idéal, was described by Robert Bienaimé as a “masterpiece of fragrant equilibrium, harmonious and of good taste as shall never be surpassed”.

== Career ==
Paul Parquet joined the perfume house of Houbigant as a part owner in 1880, and was the nose behind their most famous early creations, such as:

- Le Chypre Idéal (date unknown)
- Le Royal Houbigant (date unknown)
- Fougère Royale (1884)*
- Peau d'Espagne (1894)*
- Parfum d'Argeville (1895)*
- Cœur de Jeannette (1900)*
- Jockey Club (1900)*
- Le Parfum Idéal (1900)*
- Royal Cyclamen (1900)*
- Mes Délices (1904)
- Royal Bouvardia (1904)
- L’Œillet du Roy (1906)*
- Violette Pourpre (1907)
- La Rose France (1911)*

(*) indicates inclusion in the archives of the Osmothèque

Parquet was the chief perfumer of the house, succeeded by Robert Bienaimé, the creator of Quelques Fleurs (Houbigant, 1912).

Parquet was appointed Chevalier de la Légion d'Honneur in 1908. He bequeathed his fortune to the establishment of a pediatric center, the Fondation Paul Parquet in Neuilly-sur-Seine.

== Importance ==
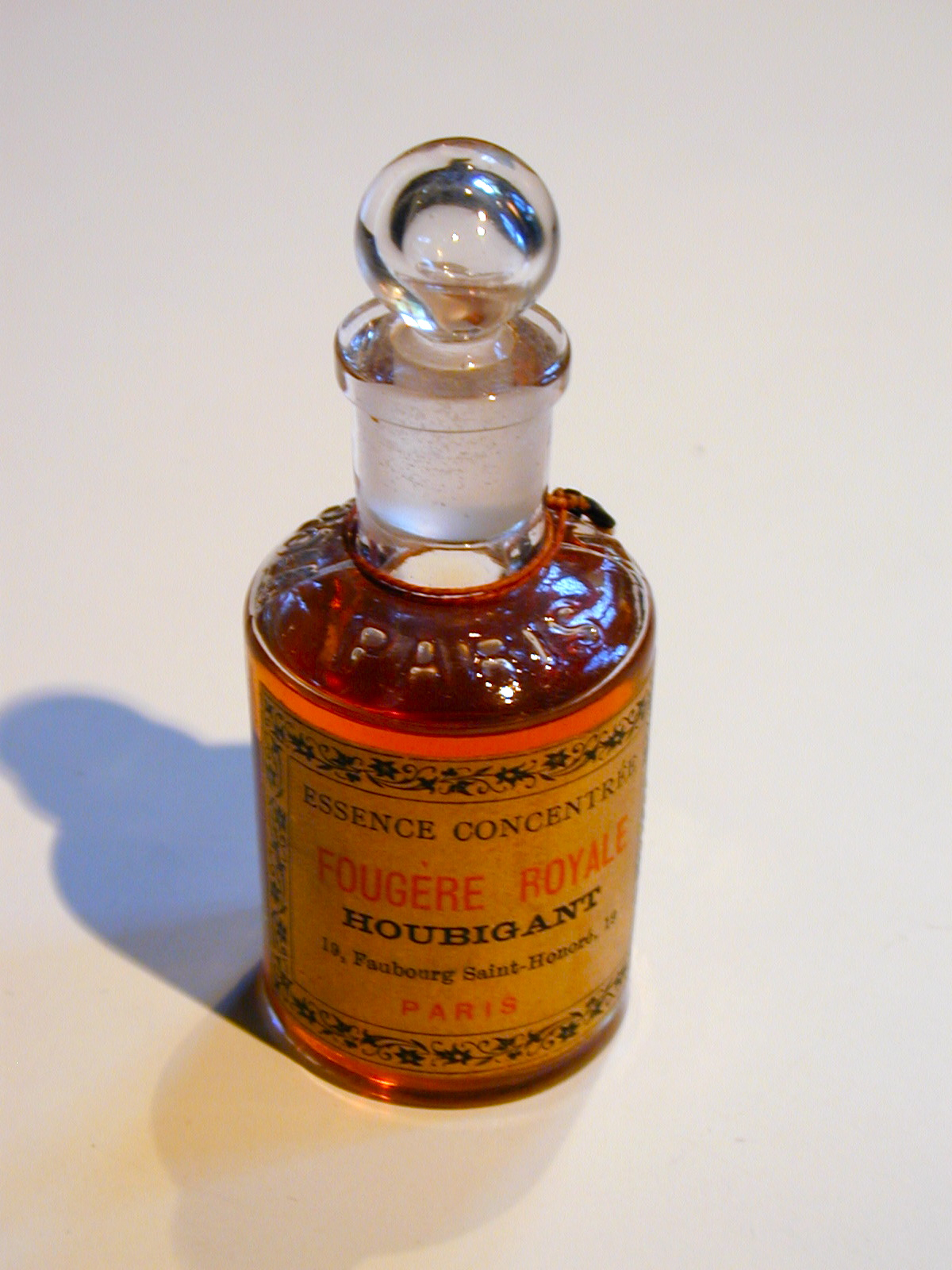
Paul Parquet's Fougère Royale (Houbigant) - 1884

With his use of coumarin in Fougère Royal, juxtaposed to lavender, citrus and woody notes, he revolutionized perfumery in being the first perfumer to ever use a synthetic fragrance material in his creations, and in conceptualizing a scent that was not an imitation of a natural smell, as ferns (fougère is French for fern) are basically odorless. Until its disappearance from the market in the late 1960s, Fougère Royale was often imitated and became the most typical representative of a whole family of related fragrance, the so-called fougère perfumes.

== Famous quote ==
"If God gave ferns a scent, they would smell like Fougère Royal", Paul Parquet.
