= Chypre =

Type of perfume

Chypre (pronounced [ʃipʁ]) is the name of a family (or concept) of perfumes that are characterised by an accord composed of citrus top notes, a middle centered on cistus labdanum, and a mossy-animalic set of basenotes derived from oakmoss. Chypre perfumes fall into numerous classes according to their modifier notes, which include but are not limited to leather, florals, fruits, and amber.

== History ==
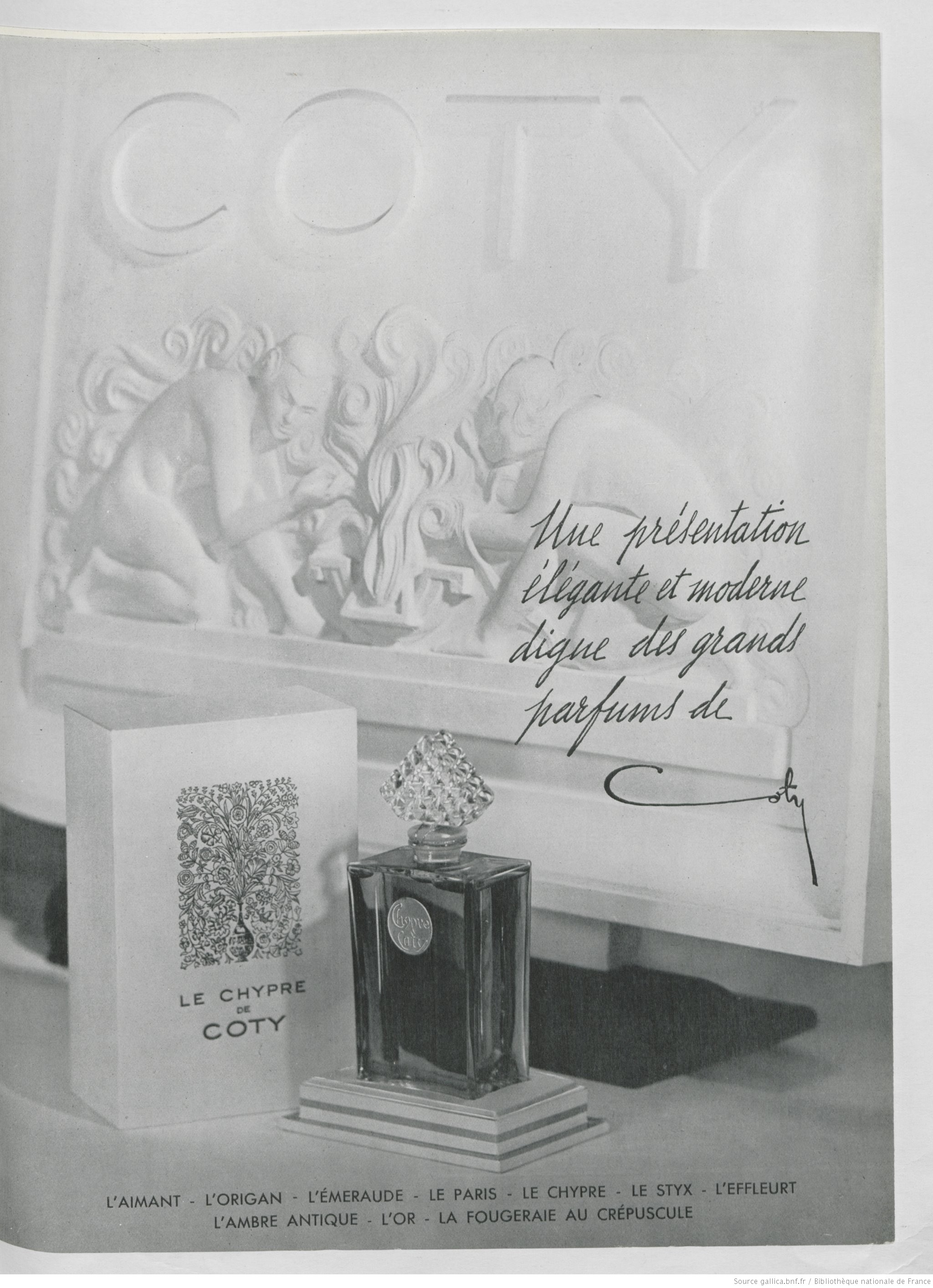
Chypre by Coty, advertisement in French Vogue, 1937

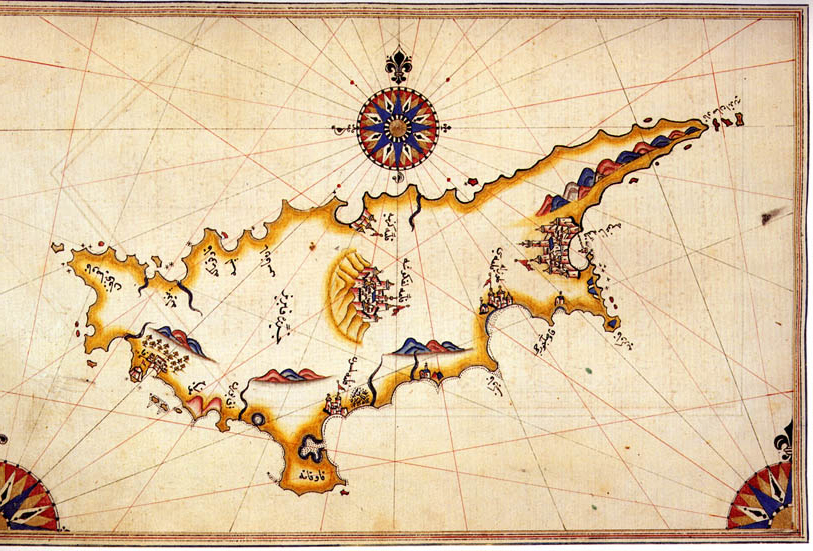
Chypre is French for Cyprus.

The term chypre is French for the island of Cyprus. Its connection to perfumery originated with the first composition to feature the bergamot-labdanum-oakmoss accord, François Coty's perfume Chypre from 1917 (now preserved at the Osmothèque), whose name was inspired by the fact that its raw materials came predominantly from Mediterranean countries. Although perfumes in a similar style had been created in the 19th century, Coty's 1917 composition was so influential that it inspired many descendants. It ultimately became the progenitor of a whole family of related fragrances sharing the same basic accord, which came to be known as "chypres."

== Chypre in popular culture ==
- Marya – the protagonist of Jean Rhys's semi-autobiographic debut novel, Quartet (Chatto and Windus, 1928) – asks a young woman in the Paris demimonde she frequents whether she wears the Coty fragrance Chypre.
- In Aldous Huxley's Brave New World (1932), the main female character, Lenina Crowne, “dabbed herself with chypre” after drying off from a bath.
- Raymond Chandler's The Lady in the Lake (Knopf, 1943) mentions a chypre-scented, monogrammed handkerchief.
- In Lawrence Durrell's Alexandria Quartet (Mountolive, first published in 1958), the protagonist, British diplomat David Mountolive, recognizes the "nervous handwriting" of his one-time lover, Leila Hosnani, on an envelope smelling of chypre.
- In the novel The Maltese Falcon, the character Joel Cairo (an elegant criminal) wears a chypre fragrance.
  - In the 1941 movie adaptation, chypre is replaced with gardenia.
- One of the two physical editions of Le Sserafim's Fearless is given the subtitle "Blue Chypre".
- In Thomas Pynchon's 2013 novel Bleeding Edge (set in New York in 2001), a character who is a professional "Nose" (perfumer) mentions "People who wouldn’t know a floral from a chypre".

== Style, concept ==
The chypre concept is characterised by the contrast between the fresh citrus accord and the woody-oakmoss base; often patchouli is considered an indispensable element as well. The chypre accord is used in both male and female perfumery.

Modern chypre perfumes have various connotations. There can be floral, fruity, green, woody-aromatic, leathery, and animalic notes, but the chypre concept is to be easily recognized by the "warm" and "mossy-woody" base which contrasts the fresh citrus top, and a certain bitterness in the drydown from the oakmoss and patchouli. The chypre accord consists of:

1. Citrus: singular or blends of bergamot, orange, lemon or neroli
2. Cistus labdanum: warm and resinous
3. Oakmoss: mossy and woody
4. Patchouli: camphoraceous and woody
5. Musk: sweet, powdery, and animalic. Usually synthetic in modern times.

The composition is usually enhanced with a floral component through rose and jasmine oil.

Animalic notes such as civet can be added to this accord to provide richness, but are less popular in modern perfumery. The most common modifiers to this basic accord include patchouli, bergamot, vetiver, ambergris, sandalwood and labdanum resin.

== Subfamilies ==
The chypre fragrances generally fit into the Oriental and Woody family of fragrance wheel classification. They can also be classified into several styles:

- Leather and/or animalic chypres, such as Bandit by Robert Piguet (1944), Cabochard by Grès (1959), and Azurée by Estée Lauder (1969).
- Floral chypres, such as Calèche by Hermès (1961), Krasnaya Moskva by Novaya Zara (1925), and Knowing by Estée Lauder (1988).
- Fruity chypres, such as Femme by Rochas (1944), Mitsouko by Guerlain (1919), and Diorama, by Dior (1949).
- Green chypres, such as Givenchy III by Givenchy (1970), Ma Griffe by Carven (1946), and Aliage by Estée Lauder (1972).
- Woody chypres, such as Aromatics Elixir by Clinique (1972).
- Fresh chypres, such as CK One by Calvin Klein (1994).

== Notable examples of chypre-type perfumes ==
- Poudre de chypre (16th century): An oakmoss powder that was used as scent.
- Guerlain Eau de Chypre (1840)
- Brocard and Co. (now Novaya Zarya) ШИПР (Shipr) (1889): A masculine cologne with a chypre accord and vanilla; it is mentioned in the 1909 poem "Отъезд Петербуржца" by Sasha Chorny.
- A. Siu & Co., шипръ (Chypre) soap (1900s)
- Novaya Zarya Krasnaya Moskva (1925): A feminine chypre perfume made in the USSR in 1925, known for its strong, excessive sillage.
- Parfums Christian Dior Miss Dior (1947): A floral chypre, whose formula was later changed, likely due to issues with the ingredient oakmoss.
