= Olivier Creed =

Perfumer (1943–2026)

- Born: 1943
- Died: 20 May 2026
- Occupation: Perfumer
- Known for: Sixth-generation head of the House of Creed
- Children: Erwin Creed

Olivier Creed (1943 – 20 May 2026) was a perfumer who led the House of Creed, the fragrance house founded in 1760 by his ancestor James Henry Creed. The sixth generation of his family to run the business, he created several of its best-known fragrances, among them Aventus, Green Irish Tweed and Silver Mountain Water.

== Early life ==
Olivier Creed was born in Nice, France during the Italian occupation in World War II.

== Career ==
Creed joined the family firm at the age of eighteen, working alongside his father, James Creed, and went on to lead the house as its master perfumer and creative director.

Creed studied at the École des Beaux-Arts and painted with Georges Braque. He completed more than 100 canvases before becoming the house's master perfumer in 1975. He is credited with expanding the business from production of about 1,000 bottles a year, working with his son Erwin from the company's factory in Fontainebleau, France.

He became master perfumer in 1980.

Among the fragrances attributed to him are Aventus, Green Irish Tweed, Silver Mountain Water, Virgin Island Water and Royal Oud.

The family sold the house in 2020 to BlackRock Long Term Private Capital and the businessman Javier Ferrán, with Creed and his son remaining involved in the business. Kering acquired the company for its Kering Beauté division in 2023, and L'Oréal in turn acquired Kering Beauté, and with it Creed, in a deal completed in 2026.

== Authorship dispute ==
In his 2021 book The Ghost Perfumer: Creed, Lies, & the Scent of the Century, the journalist Gabe Oppenheim alleged that several fragrances credited to Creed had been composed by the perfumer Pierre Bourdon, including Green Irish Tweed, Silver Mountain Water and Millésime Impérial. According to the book, Creed took compositions Bourdon had submitted unsuccessfully to other brands, with Bourdon's knowledge, and paid him little in return. The book also credits Aventus to Jean-Christophe Hérault, a former student of Bourdon.

== Death ==
Creed died on 20 May 2026 at the age of 82. His son Erwin Creed, who had served as the house's co-creative director, survives him.

Cyril Chapuy, president of L'Oréal Luxe, said that "the world of haute parfumerie has lost one of its great figures", describing Creed's "quiet passion, humility, and deep commitment to craftsmanship".
