= Jean-François Houbigant =

French perfumer

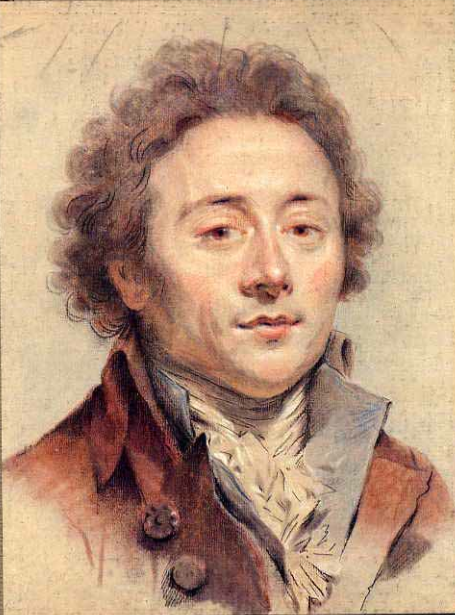
Jean-François Houbigant

Jean-François Houbigant (21 December 1752 – 22 October 1807) was a French perfumer who founded the second oldest perfumery in France. He established a modest shop in 1775 at 57 rue du Faubourg-Saint-Honoré (which would become No. 19 when the street was renumbered in 1806). He chose a basket of flowers to identify the front of his shop and that emblem will remain the symbol of Houbigant through the years.

== History ==
Jean-François Houbigant was born in Paris, France, on 21 December 1752 to Nicolas Houbigant and Geneviève Rolinart, both servants. His mother worked for the Duchess of Charost, who owned a mansion at what is now 39 Rue du Faubourg Saint Honoré. It is said that the Duchess was very kind and that she decided to take Jean-François under her wing by giving him an education and a modest nest egg to start in life.

At the time, the fashion for perfume, powders, and blushes was in full swing primarily because of the awful stench in the streets of Paris and from its inhabitants. The young Jean-François worked his way into this community of merchants, who were licensed to make and sell perfumes, powders, ointments, soaps, scented water, gloves, mittens, and knitted leather. The statutes in this community, which required four years of education followed by three years of apprenticeship, were enacted in 1190 during the reign of Philippe II, duke of Orléans (also known as Philippe-Auguste), and were renewed by Louis XIV in 1656. Patents cost 50 pounds and 550 pounds for certification.

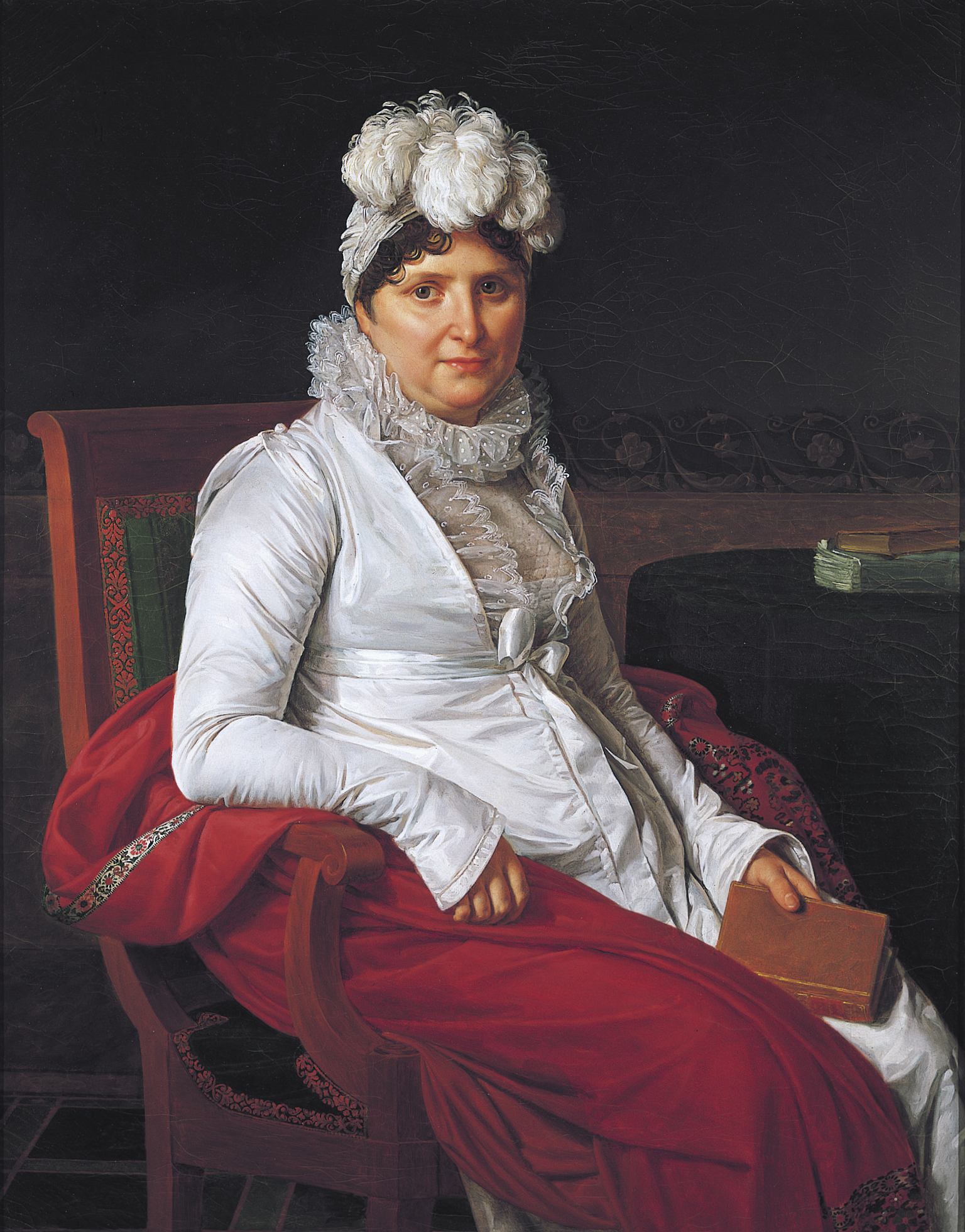
Madame Houbigant, born Nicole Adéläide Deschamps (Merry-Joseph Blondel, c. 1807)

Jean-François Houbigant would thus become a master perfumer under the tutelage of his future father-in-law, allowing him to open a shop and sell his own products. He chose a trendy area and a street where new mansions were under construction, such as the Hotel d’Évreux (which later became the Élysée Palace), the Hotel Beauvau, and the Hotel Edmond de Rothschild. Age 23 at the time, he rented a boutique on this street and took as his trademark the phrase: “Houbigant is a perfume merchant, glove manufacturer, and creator of powders, ointments, and the highest-quality blush; he also makes and sells assorted wedding and christening baskets”.

His ledger from 1777 to 1782 shows that much nobility came to his shop, such as the Duchess of Charost (of course), the knight Jean de Manville, the Viscountess of St. Hermine, the Marquis of La Rochelambert, the Viscount of Choiseul, the Marquise of Erneville, Father of Osmond, and the Countess of Matignon. Having established his business, in June 1781 he married Nicole Adéläide Deschamps. The couple waited until 1790 to have their only child, Armand Gustave, who unfortunately did not follow the family trade.

The history of France took a sharp turn during the French Revolution (1789–1799), but Jean-François’ business came out unscathed. Subsequent years brought an avalanche of change: the First Republic in 1792, the Reign of Terror in 1793, the National Convention in 1794, the Directory in 1795, the French Consulate in 1799, the Concordat of 1801, and finally the establishment of the First French Empire by Napoleon in 1804. Interest in perfumes and powders did not weaken during this time, and as the clientele changed, Jean-François adapted his business.

On 22 October 1807, Jean-François Houbigant died at the age of 55, without knowing that his name would go down in history. He left a thriving business to his wife and son. In order to continue the work of her late husband and because of the statutes in this profession, Nicole Adelaide had no choice but to marry the chief clerk of the store.

== List of products ==
Here are some products that anyone could find in his shop

- Dog-skin gloves for men, women, and children, such as winter and everyday gloves in all colors, gloves for larger hands, fur gloves, etc.
- White, flower-based powders made of orange flower, tuberose, Spanish flowers, frangipane, etc.
- Brown powders in Marshal, Sultana, and British styles, etc.
- Colored, odorless powders to degrease hair, prevent sweat, etc.
- Ointments made of roses, heliotrope, acacia, Milady, beef marrow with hazelnut oil, snail, etc.
- Quintessence made of neroli oil, myrtle, lavender, musk, etc.
- Scented water made of sweet water, cassia, cithara, cedar, distilled vinegar, essence of melissa, etc.
- Soaps – perfumed or not – made of Turkish rose, fine amber, neroli oil, carnations, herbs, etc.
- Marzipan made of honey, orange flowers, Spanish jasmine, etc.
- Lozenges
- Ribbons from Bruges, Belgium
- Fine sponges
- Toothbrushes
- Flasks
- Potpourri from Montpellier, France
- Sachets of iris flowers from Florence, Italy
- Swan tassels from Holland
- Powder masks
- Depilatory waxes
