= Drakkar Noir =

Line of men's cologne marketed by Guy Laroche

Fragrance by Guy Laroche
- Released: 1982
- Label: Guy Laroche
- Tagline: Feel the power
- Website: www.guylaroche.com

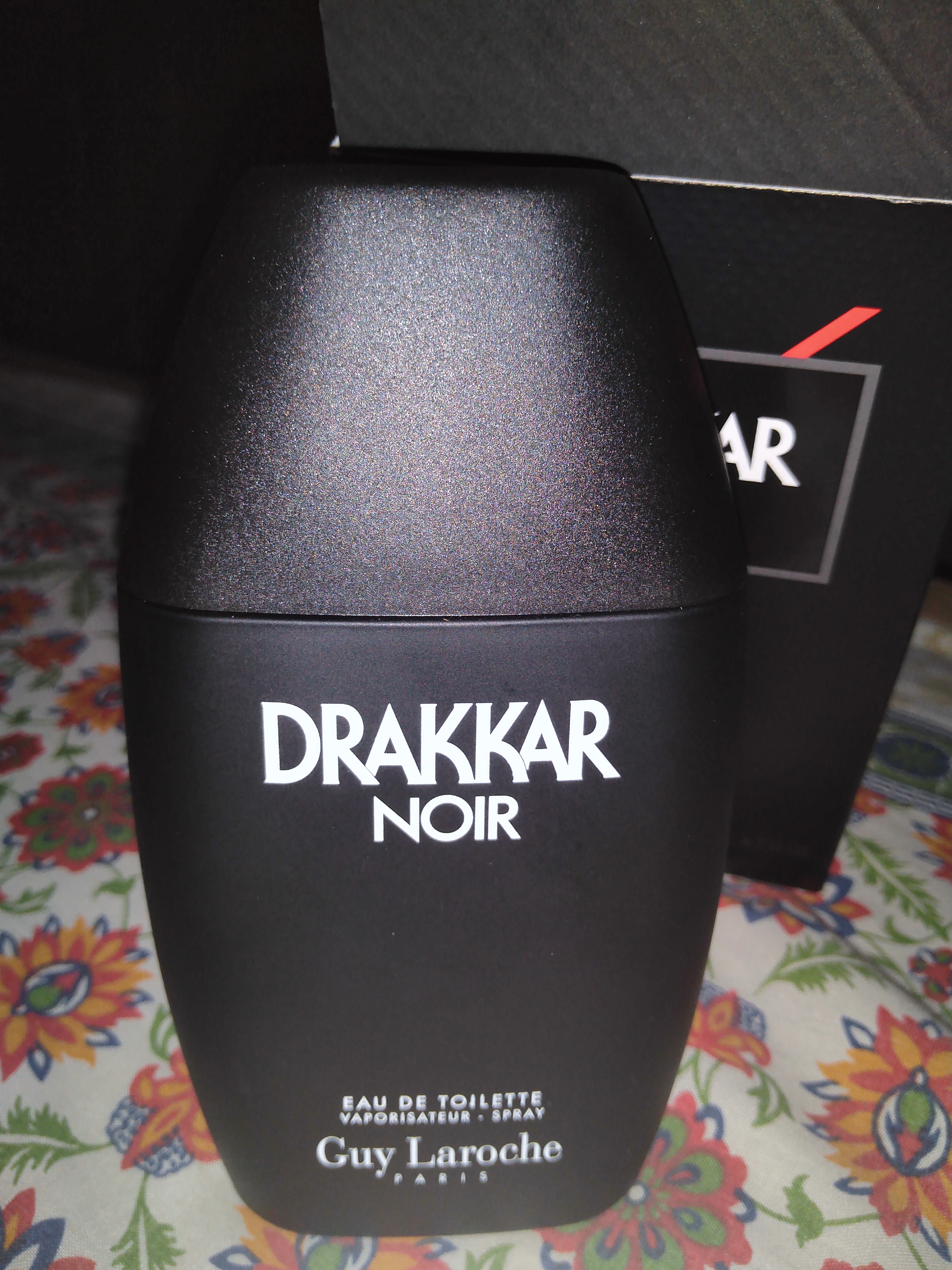

Drakkar Noir is a men's fragrance by Guy Laroche created by perfumer Pierre Wargnye. The fragrance was introduced in 1982 and is manufactured under license by the L'Oréal Group. It is a successor scent to the brand's 1972 fragrance Drakkar, launched to appeal to a British market. It won the 1985 FiFi Award for "Most Successful Men's Fragrance (Limited)", and, in 2010, the Canadian Fragrance Awards' "Hall of Fame Award—Men's". In 1991, it was the bestselling men's "prestige" ($20+) scent worldwide. The name is pronounced with the stress on the second syllable "Dra-CAR". According to The New York Times, the name derives from "a flat-bottomed Viking ship".

== Product overview ==
I do believe the secret behind this fragrance is the emotion of its construction as well as the power feeling that it evokes. It’s still very modern nowadays due to its timeless contrasting and its sensual masculine power.

— Pierre Wargnye, perfumer; creator of Drakkar Noir

Drakkar Noir comes in a sleek black metallic bottle. The fragrance is an aromatic fougère, with top notes of bergamot, rosemary, lavender, middle notes of cardamom and geranium, and a dry down of vetiver, cedar, and fir balsam. The top note includes prominent dihydromyrcenol, a synthetic odorant with a metallic citric-floral character, typical of the fougère family fragrances. Compared to the original Drakkar fragrance, Drakkar Noir is darker, with notes of leather and patchouli that the original lacks. Drakkar Noir helped cement a trend of fresh fougère scents in the 1980s.

=== Marketing ===
Marketing for Drakkar Noir has focused on themes of masculinity, sensuality, decadence, darkness, and lust. The name Drakkar is derived from the word drakar/drekar, a type of Viking longship, invoking the "virile charm" associated to the Viking warriors. The fragrance's name also has a similar sound to Count Dracula, a fictional vampire known for his seductive cruelty; through the name, themes associated with Dracula are believed to become unconsciously associated with the fragrance in the mind of consumers.

Print advertisements for Drakkar Noir have visually emphasized these themes. One ad displayed the fragrance bottle in the center of the page on a dark background, with a beam of light crossing the page and not touching the bottle; this lack of illumination serves to emphasize the bottle. The dark visuals of the ad are intended to subconsciously evoke mystery, sensuality, and forbidden pleasures. Another ad portrayed a man's unclothed arm from just below the wrist, gripping a bottle of Drakkar Noir. A woman's hand with long, red-painted nails assertively grips his bare arm at the wrist. The ad portrays masculine strength and the female desire for security in that strength. The ad was re-shot for the United Arab Emirates (UAE) to accommodate cultural differences: in the UAE version, the man is wearing a suit, and the woman's fingers are lightly grazing his hand in a more subordinate fashion. The overall effect was to reduce the amount of bare skin displayed and to make the contact less obviously intimate, in accordance with Arabic cultural norms, without reducing the attractiveness of the image.

From 1986 to 1991, a TV commercial for the fragrance featured a mysterious young man engaging in masculine activities such as archery, nightclubbing, and flirting with a beautiful woman. From 1991 to 1993, another TV commercial featured a boxer and his girlfriend, played by supermodel Stephanie Seymour. The print advertising campaign was photographed by Herb Ritts. In 1994, a new commercial, shot by director Jean-Baptiste Mondino, was introduced. It depicted a rock star amongst his wildly excited fans. In 2013, a new commercial was released featuring the Brazilian football player Neymar, photographed again by Jean-Baptiste Mondino, promoting social inclusion through sport.

In 1993, Guy Laroche offered a promotional CD, Best of Rock, with every purchase of Drakkar Noir. The CD featured tracks by Jimi Hendrix, Rod Stewart, and others. In 2002, L'Oréal signed a US$10 million sponsorship agreement for NASCAR race driver Dale Earnhardt Jr. to endorse Drakkar Noir.
