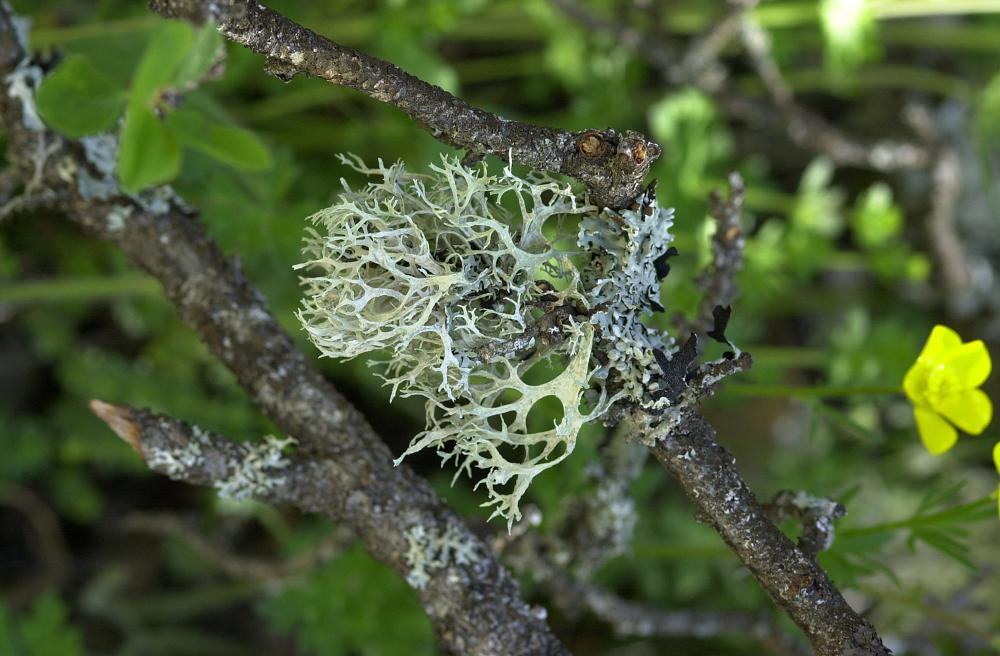

Conservation status
- Secure (NatureServe)

Scientific classification
- Kingdom: Fungi
- Division: Ascomycota
- Class: Lecanoromycetes
- Order: Lecanorales
- Family: Parmeliaceae
- Genus: Evernia
- Species: E. prunastri

Binomial name
- Evernia prunastri (L.) Ach. (1810)

Synonyms
- Lichen prunastri L. (1753)

= Oakmoss =

Species of lichenised fungus

Oakmoss (scientific name Evernia prunastri) is a species of lichen. It can be found in many mountainous temperate forests throughout the Northern Hemisphere. Oakmoss grows primarily on the trunk and branches of oak trees, but is also commonly found on the bark of other deciduous trees and conifers such as fir and pine. The thalli of oakmoss are short and bushy, and grow together on bark to form large clumps. Oakmoss thallus is flat and strap-like. They are also highly branched, resembling the form of antlers. The colour of oakmoss ranges from green to a greenish-white when dry, and dark olive-green to yellow-green when wet. The texture of the thalli is rough when dry and rubbery when wet. It is used extensively in modern perfumery.

== Description ==
Thallus fruticose or technically foliose (by virtue of having differentiated upper and lower surfaces), erect or drooping, to 7(13) cm long, dichotomously branched; branches flattened, 1–5(10) mm wide, ± flaccid; upper surface greenish or yellowish green; lower surface whitish; soredia present (though soredia occasionally very sparse); apothecia not seen.

=== Similar species ===
Shade-growing forms have narrow lobes and can be confused with Ramalina species. The subtle contrast between the greenish upper surface and the slightly paler lower surface of E. prunastri distinguishes it. It is also possible to recognize the difference between the stiffer, cartilaginous texture of Ramalina when dry and the softer feel of Evernia.

== Commercial uses ==
Oakmoss is commercially harvested in countries of South-Central Europe and usually exported to the Grasse region of France where its fragrant compounds are extracted as oakmoss absolutes and extracts. These raw materials are often used as perfume fixatives and form the base notes of many fragrances. They are also key components of Fougère and Chypre class perfumes. The lichen has a distinct and complex odour and can be described as woody, sharp and slightly sweet. Oakmoss growing on pines have a pronounced turpentine odor that is valued in certain perfume compositions.

In parts of Central Italy, oakmoss has been used as for biomonitoring the deposition of heavy metals at urban, rural, and industrial sites. Studies of bioaccumulation for zinc, lead, chromium, cadmium, and copper in lichen samples were performed five times at regular intervals between November 2000 and December 2001. As expected, the rural areas showed smaller impact of those five heavy metals when compared to urban and industrial areas.

== Health and safety information ==
Oakmoss should be avoided by people with known skin sensitization issues. Its use in perfumes is now highly restricted by International Fragrance Association regulations, and many scents have been reformulated in recent years with other chemicals substituted for oakmoss.

== Ecology and Habitat ==
Oakmoss grows on wood or bark, especially on hardwood trees and shrubs, occasionally on conifers. It is ubiquitous in most low-elevation habitats in the Pacific Northwest west of the Cascades, especially in hardwood forests, savannas, and urban and agricultural areas; less abundant in lower montane forests.

== Conservation status ==
Evernia prunastri is listed as critically endangered (CR) in Iceland, where it is found in only one location. As of February 2026, it has not been evaluated by the IUCN.

== Gallery ==
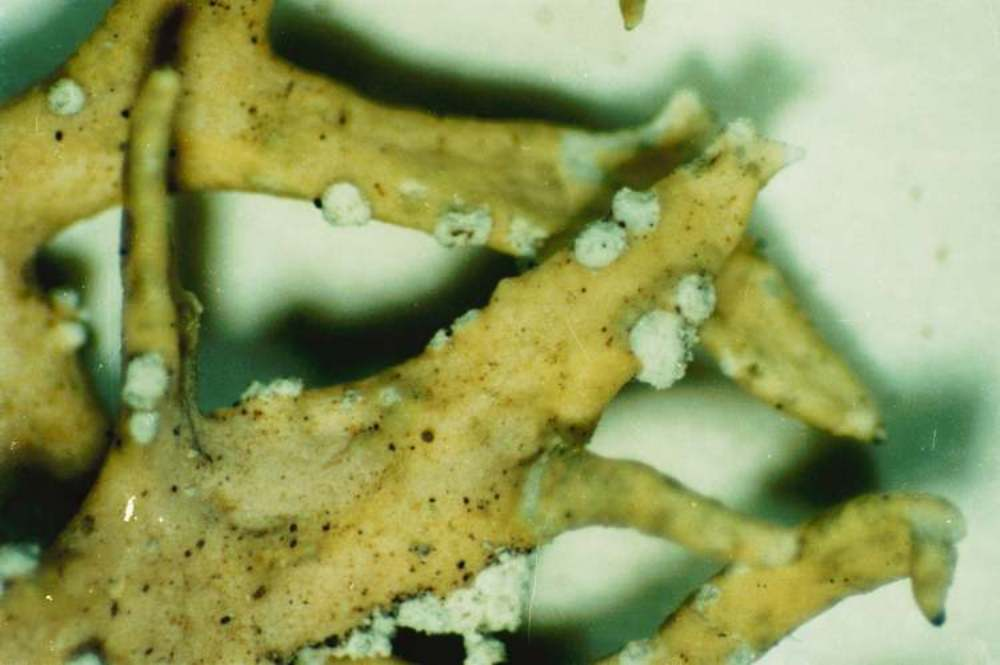
Close-up photo showing branches with soredia

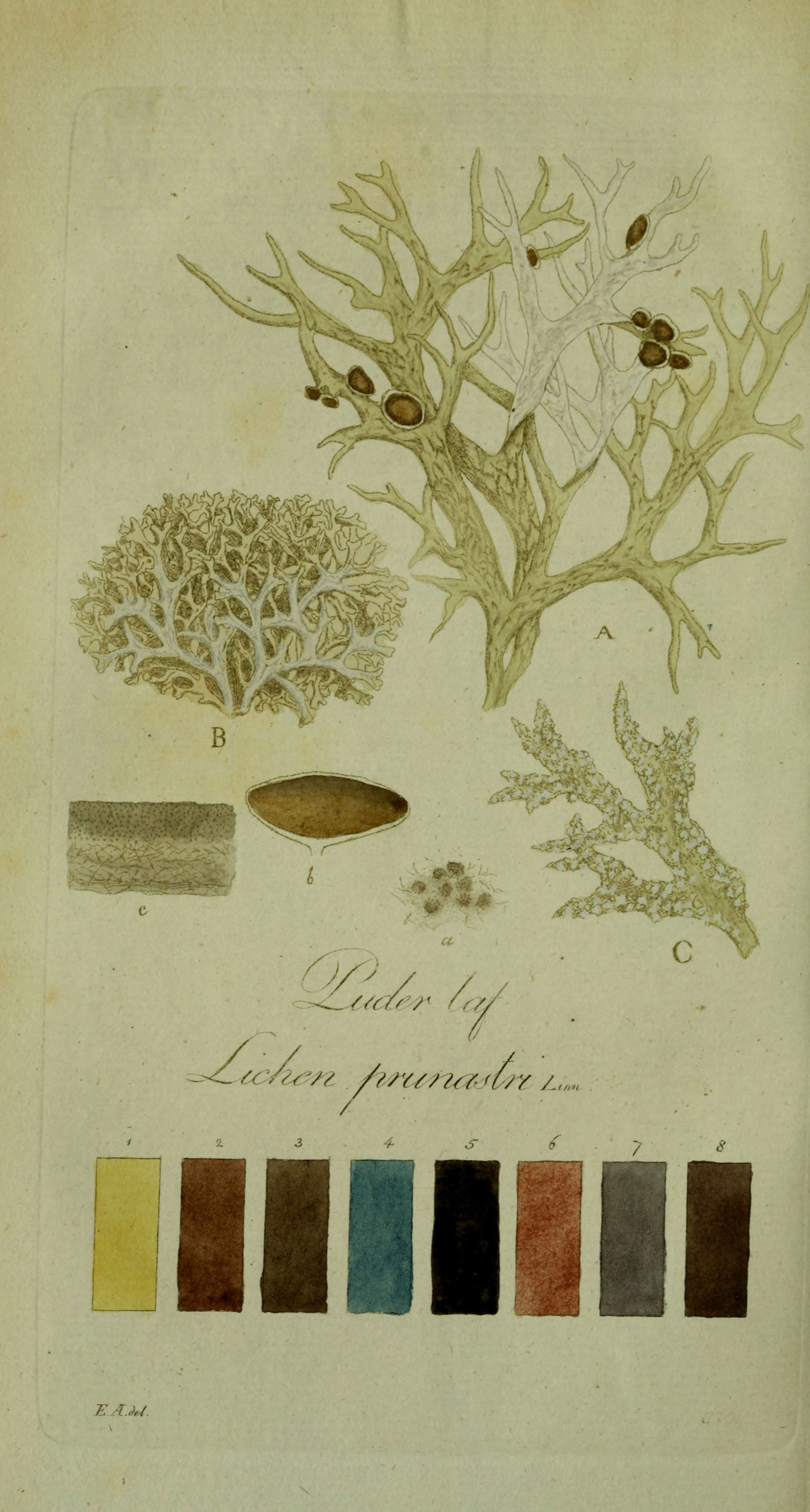
Illustration of Lichen prunastri.

== See also ==
- Ethnolichenology
- Pseudevernia furfuracea, used as a substitute for oakmoss in perfumery
- List of lichens named by Carl Linnaeus
