= Guy Laroche =

French fashion designer (1921–1989)

- Born: 16 July 1921; La Rochelle, France
- Died: 17 February 1989 (aged 67); Paris, France
- Occupations: Fashion designer, milliner

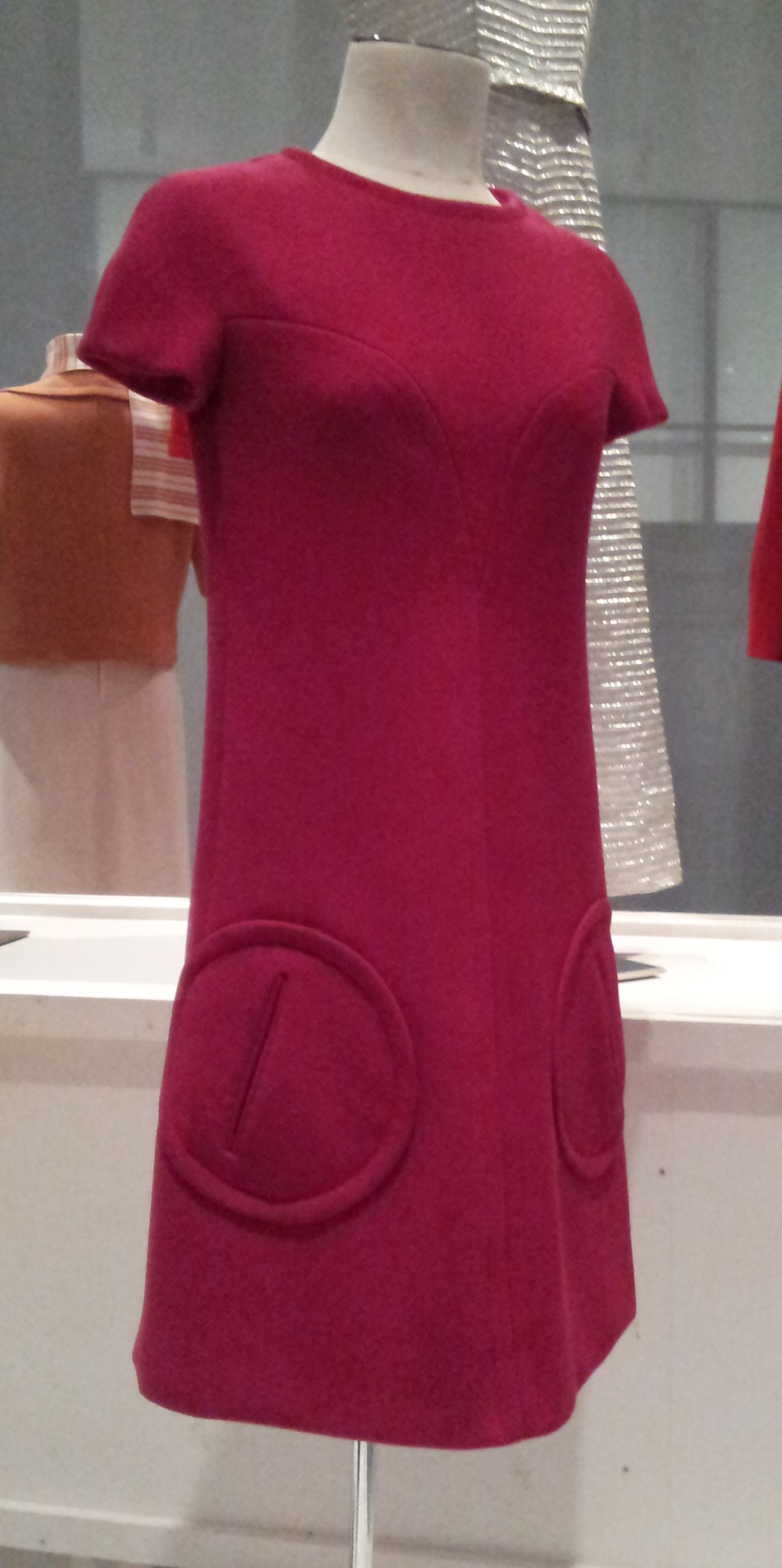
Guy Laroche cyclamen pink wool minidress, 1968

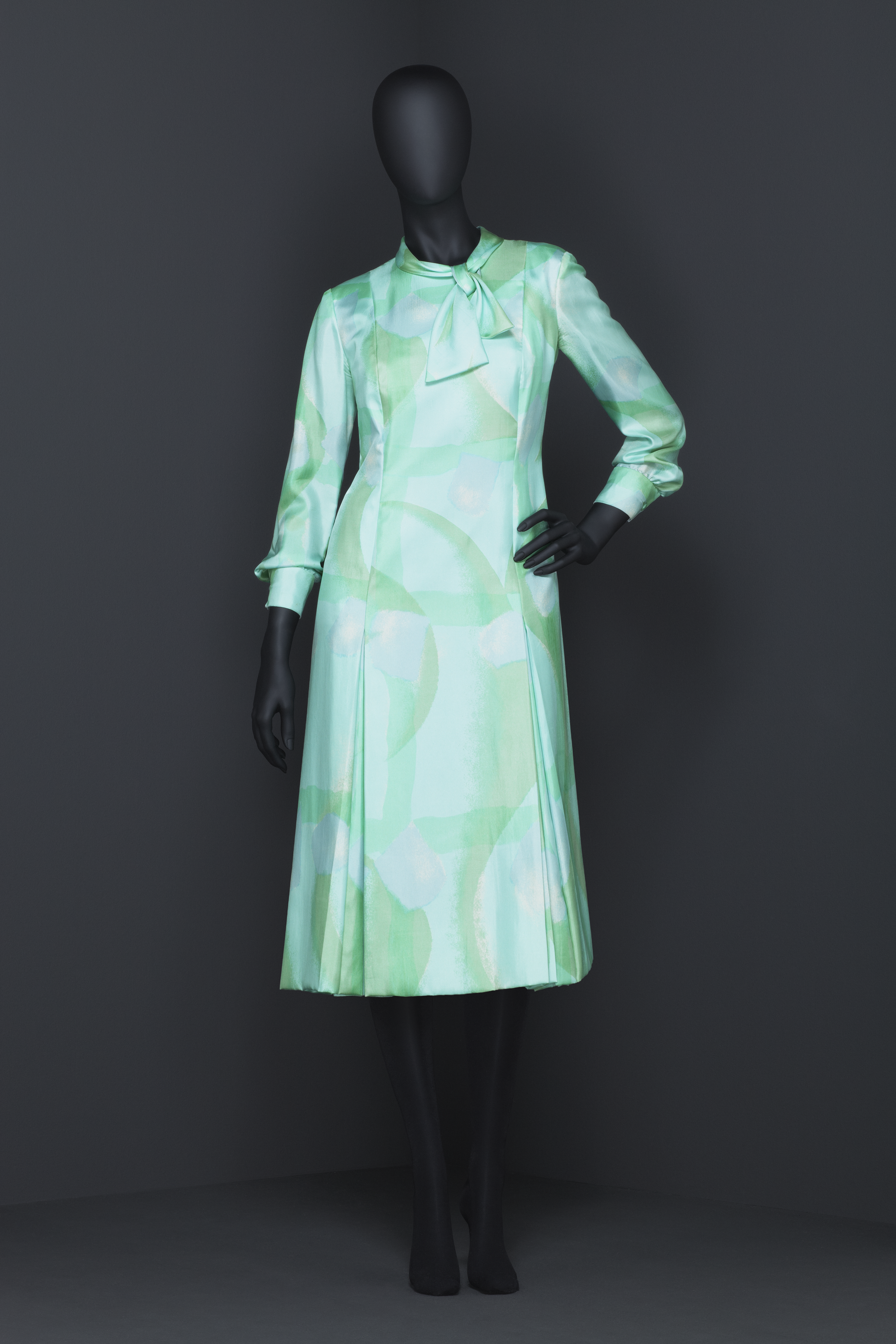
Silk Knot Detail Dress, c 1973

Guy Laroche (French pronunciation: [ɡi laʁɔʃ]; 16 July 1921–17 February 1989) was a French fashion designer and the founder of the eponymous company.

== Biography ==
Laroche was born in La Rochelle to a Tunisian Jewish family, where his parents ran the Hotel de France. After graduating from secondary school, he moved to Paris and trained as a milliner. In 1948, he was hired as the assistant to couturier Jean Dessès. Later, in 1955, he visited the U.S. to investigate new ready-to-wear manufacturing methods. In 1957, he founded a high-fashion atelier at 37 Avenue Franklin Roosevelt, Paris.

His first collection was favorably received, and within it he reintroduced vibrant colors such as pink, orange, coral, topaz, and turquoise. His clothes also featured plunging neck and back lines. Traditional elegant color combinations remained a staple in his designs as well. He cited Christian Dior, Cristobal Balenciaga, Jacques Fath and Pierre Balmain as his main influences.

Laroche designed haute couture but practical clothing for women. For the American market, he was one of the first to create separates.

In 1961, he moved to larger quarters in a townhouse at 29 Avenue Montaigne, Paris, opened a boutique there, and introduced his first ready-to-wear collection. In 1966, Laroche launched men's ready-to-wear and opened the Guy Laroche Monsieur boutique.

Laroche died of intestinal cancer in Paris on 17 February 1989, at the age of 67.

In November 2007, Franco-Swedish designer Marcel Marongiu took over as artistic director of Guy Laroche.

== Fragrances ==
In his lifetime, Laroche worked with Daniel Moliere, Alain Astori, Max Gavarry, Michel Girard, Pierre Wargnye, and Joséphine Catapano to create fragrances for women and men. After his death, L'Oréal created additional fragrances under his name.

- Fidji (1966)
- Eau Folle (1970)
- Drakkar (1977)
- J'ai Osé (1977)
- Fidji du Soir (1977)
- Drakkar Noir (1982)
- Clandestine (1986)
- Horizon (1993)
- Drakkar Dynamik (1999)

== Gallery ==
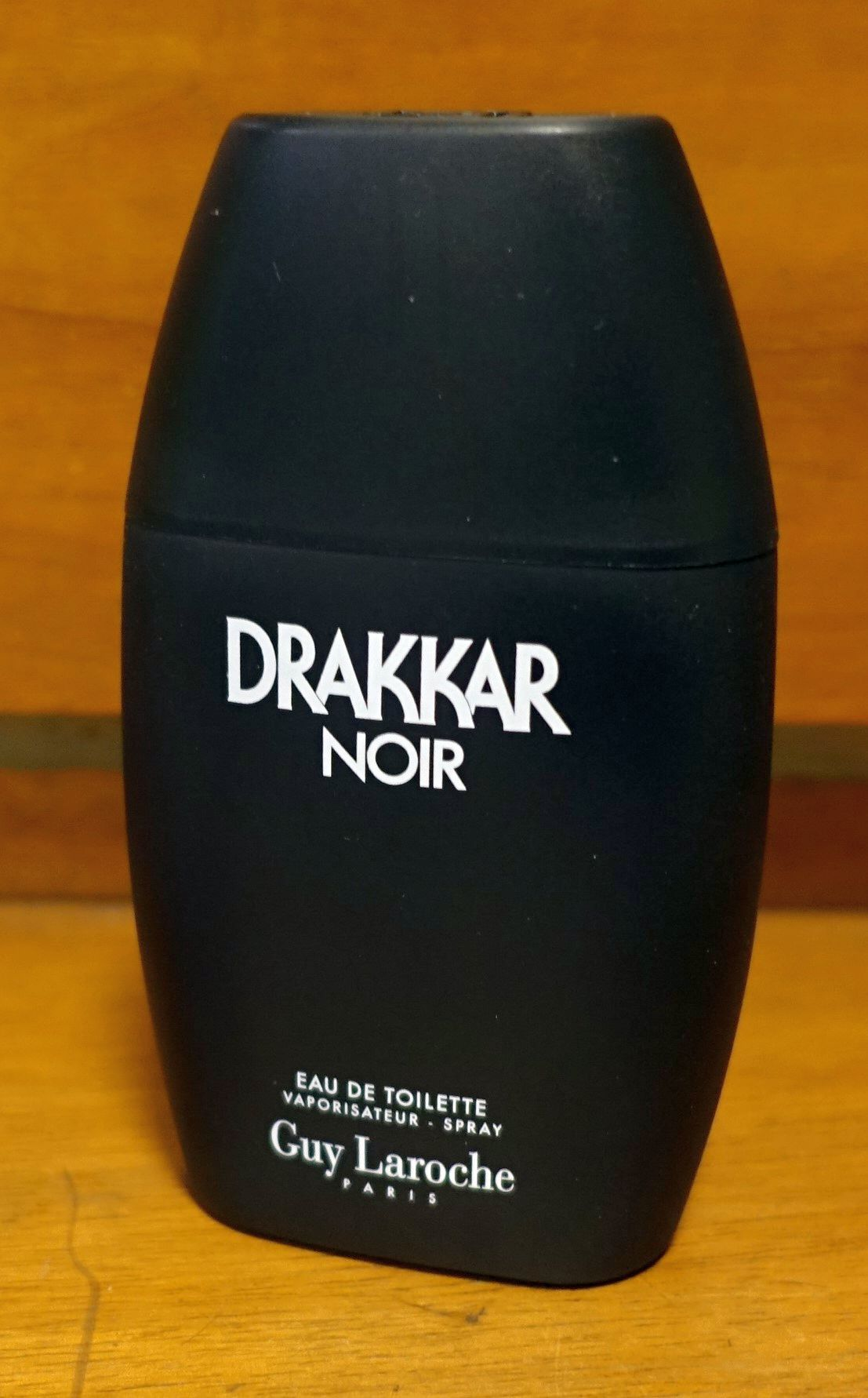
Perfume Drakkar Noir

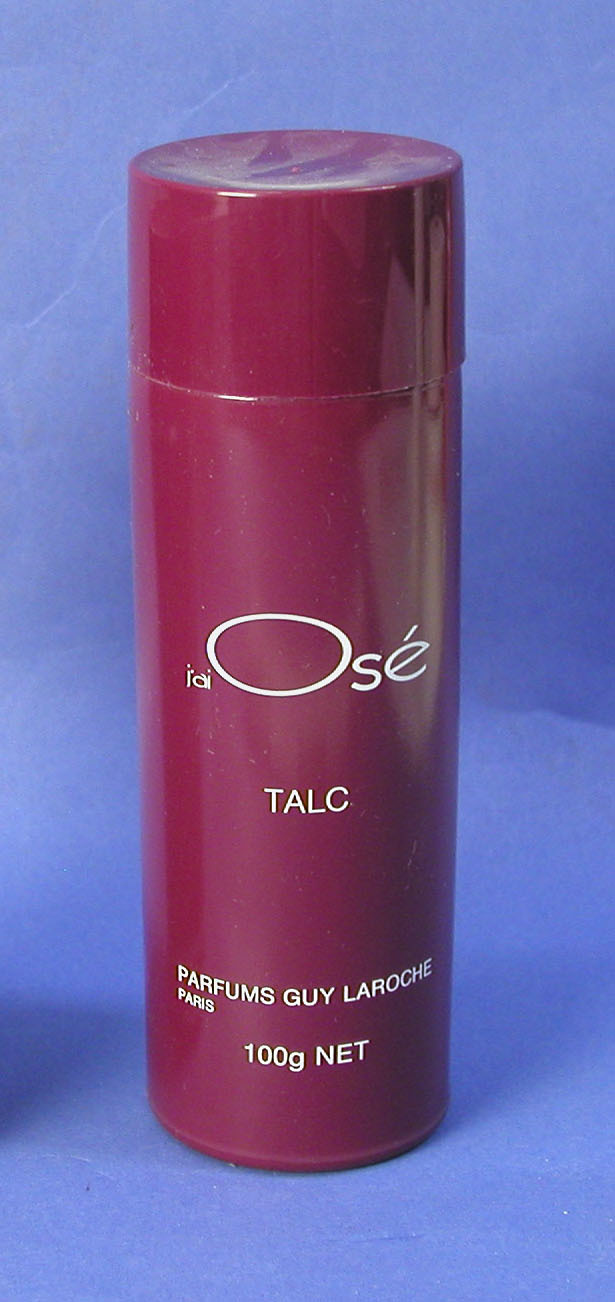
J'ai Osé Powder

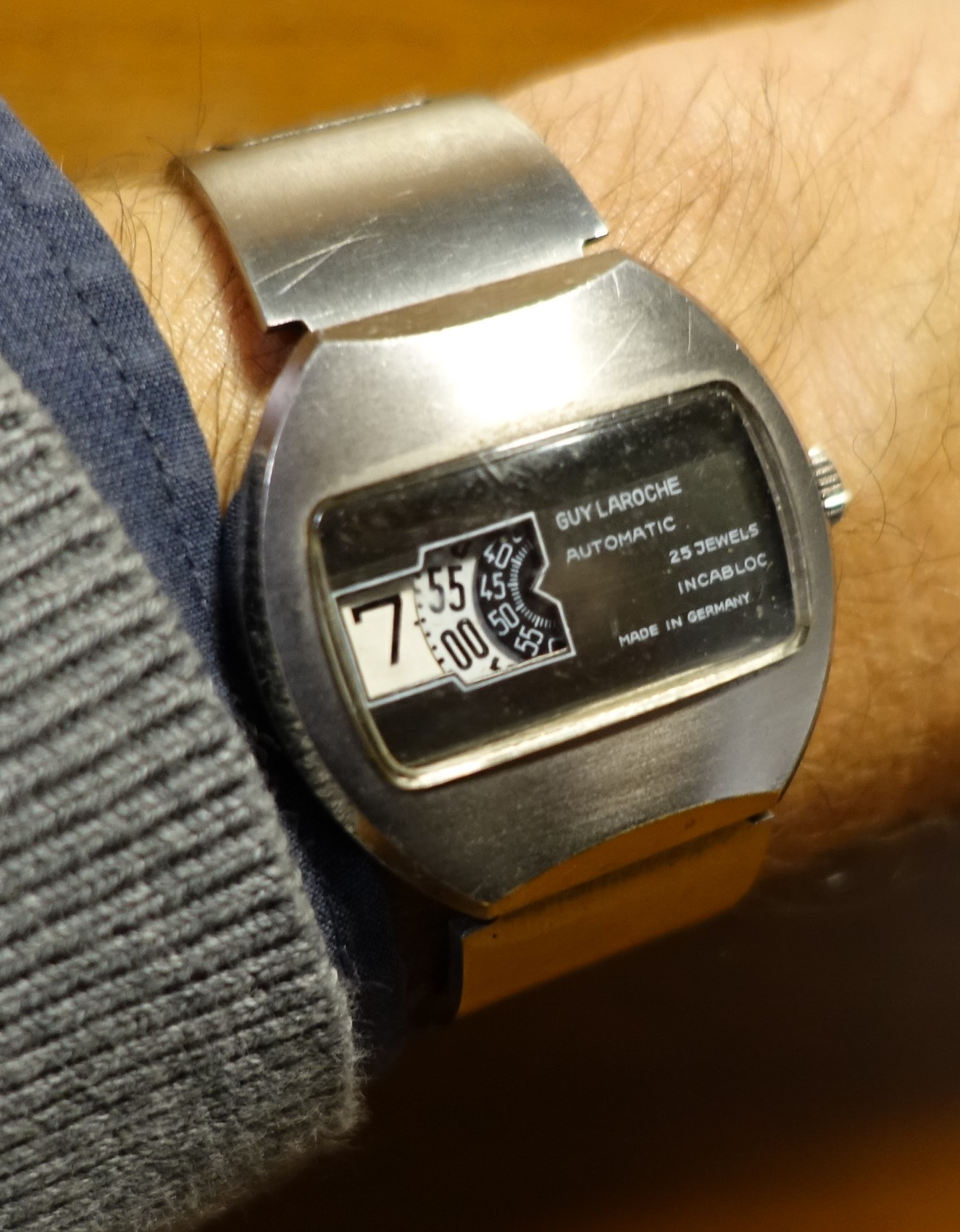
Rare Laroche jumpwatch

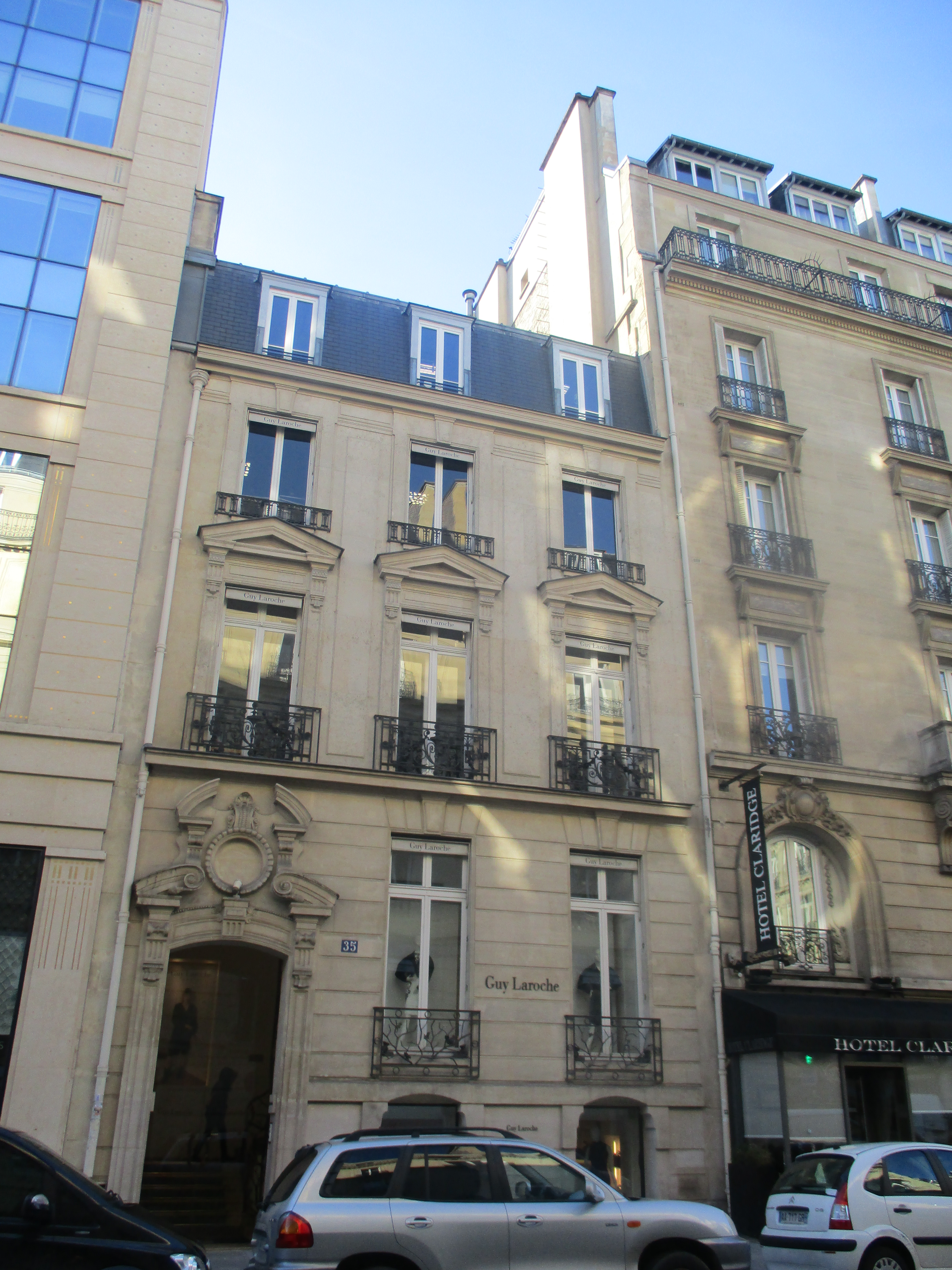
The House of Laroche
