= Zino Davidoff =

Swiss cigar merchant and author (1906–1994)

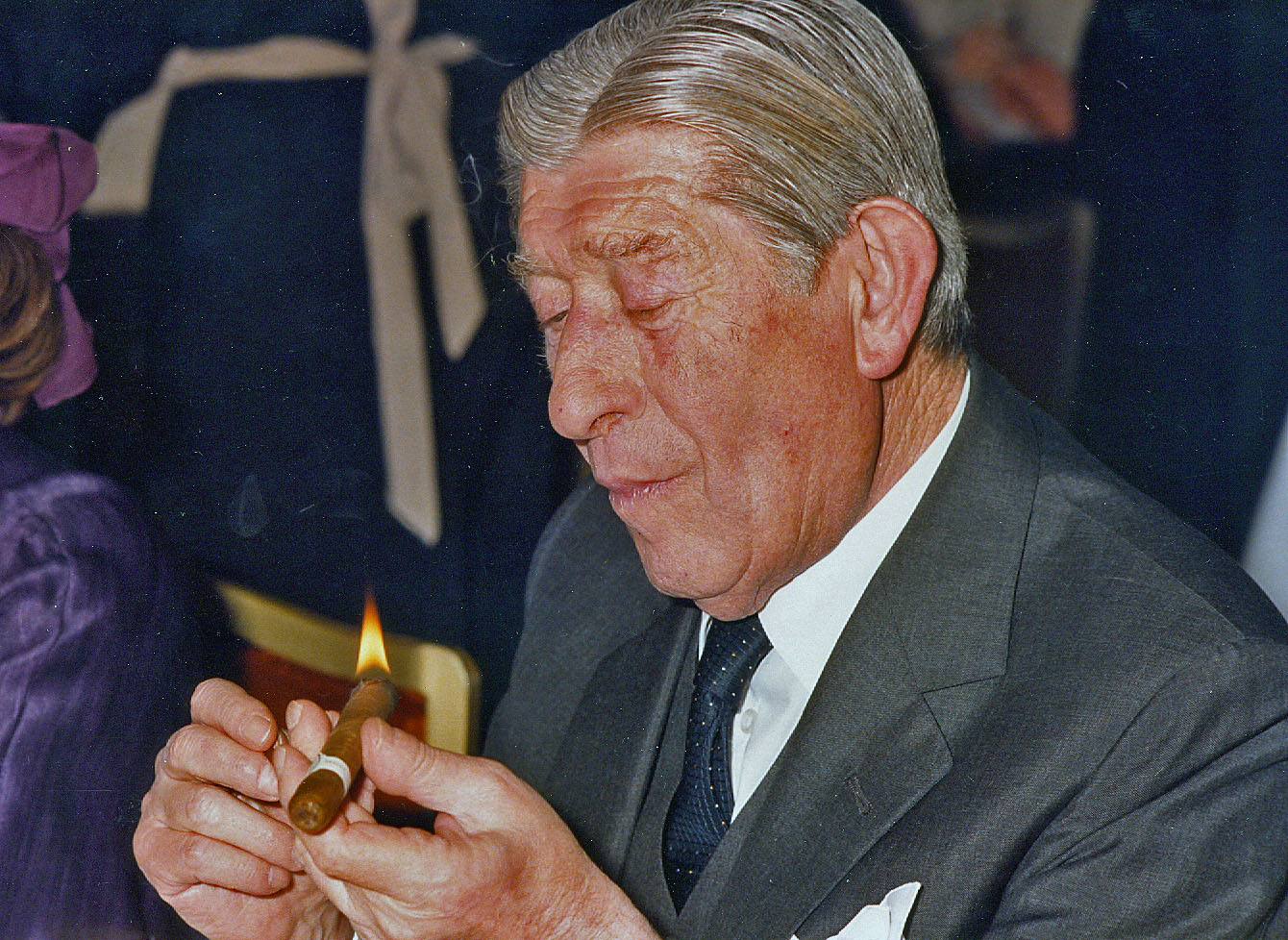
- Born: Sussele-Meier Davidoff; 11 March 1906; Novhorod-Siverskyi, Chernihiv Governorate, Russian Empire
- Died: 14 January 1994 (aged 87); Geneva, Switzerland
- Resting place: Jewish Cemetery of Veyrier, Switzerland
- Other names: Zinovy Davidoff; "Mister Cigar"; "King of Cigars"
- Occupations: Tobacconist; merchant; author
- Years active: c. 1930 – 1994
- Known for: Founder of Davidoff; pioneer of the desktop humidor
- Spouse: Marthe Meyer (m. 1931)
- Children: 1 (Sonia)
- Parent(s): Hillel ("Henri") Davidoff (father); Rachel Davidoff (mother)
- Relatives: León, Joseph, Nina, Helène (siblings)

Zino Davidoff (born Sussele-Meier Davidoff, later russified as Zinovy Davidoff; 11 March 1906 – 14 January 1994) was a Swiss tobacconist, cigar merchant and author of Ukrainian-Jewish origin. The proprietor of the Davidoff tobacco shop in Geneva from the early 1930s until his death, he established the Davidoff name as one of the world's most recognised luxury cigar brands and was widely known by the epithet "King of Cigars".

He is credited with the invention of the desktop humidor, with introducing French Bordeaux nomenclature to the cigar trade through his 1946 Château series, and with persuading Cuba's state tobacco monopoly to roll a personal house brand for him at the El Laguito factory in Havana — the same atelier that produced Fidel Castro's Cohíbas. His 1967 work The Connoisseur's Book of the Cigar (Le livre du connaisseur de cigare) sold more than 200,000 copies in multiple languages and became a standard reference of cigar literature.

== Early life ==
Davidoff was born on 11 March 1906 in Novhorod-Siverskyi, a small town in Chernihiv Governorate of the Russian Empire (present-day Ukraine), to a Jewish family in the tobacco trade. He was the second of five children of Hillel Davidoff (often Westernised as Henri) and his wife Rachel; his siblings were León, Joseph, Nina and Helène. His father operated a small tobacco business in Kyiv where, despite official restrictions, he blended oriental tobaccos and rolled cigarettes for friends and customers.

In 1911, against the background of the anti-Jewish pogroms that had swept the Russian Empire from 1905 onward, the Davidoff family fled westward and settled in Geneva, Switzerland. The five-year-old Zino arrived with his parents and siblings as refugees. His father quickly opened a small tobacco shop on the Place des Philosophes (later moved to premises on the Rue de la Confédération and the Rue du Marché) which rapidly became a meeting place for Russian émigrés and political exiles, including, by some accounts, Russian Social Democrats then living in Switzerland.

Davidoff was educated at the Collège Calvin in Geneva, the secondary school founded by John Calvin in 1559 and one of the oldest in Europe. He was inclined toward languages, the humanities and music — he had wanted to study the violin — rather than the sciences, and left school at the age of around twenty without continuing to university.

== Apprenticeship in the Americas ==
In 1924 Davidoff travelled to South and Central America to learn the tobacco trade at its source. Stateless and travelling on a Nansen-style League of Nations passport, he reportedly had his papers stolen shortly after arrival in Argentina; local officials, mistaking the impressive-looking document for diplomatic credentials, issued him with new identity papers, granting him Argentine citizenship. He would later acquire Swiss citizenship.

For roughly five years, beginning in 1925, Davidoff worked on tobacco plantations and in cigar factories in Argentina, Brazil and Cuba, studying cultivation, fermentation, blending and rolling techniques. His extended stay in Cuba was decisive; he later described the encounter with Cuban tobacco as "a discovery, a wonder." He returned to Geneva around 1930.

== Davidoff of Geneva ==
=== Building the shop ===
On returning to Switzerland, Davidoff entered his father's shop on the Rue de la Confédération and progressively took over the buying, marketing and direction of the business. In November 1931 he married Marthe (also given as Martha) Meyer, the daughter of a Basel merchant family; her dowry enabled him to purchase the shop outright from his father, who had refused to mortgage the business so that his son could borrow against it. The couple had a daughter, Sonia, born in 1933.

Aware that the Cuban tobacco he sold had been grown and aged in conditions that had no equivalent in cool, dry continental Europe, Davidoff converted the shop's basement into a climate-controlled cellar designed to reproduce the humidity and temperature of the Caribbean. The room is generally credited as the first commercial humidified cigar cellar in Europe and the conceptual ancestor of the modern desktop humidor, of which Davidoff is widely regarded as the inventor.

=== Second World War ===
The outbreak of the Second World War proved transformative for the business. In 1939, with German forces approaching France, Seita, the French state tobacco monopoly, offered Davidoff its threatened stockpile of approximately two million Havana cigars then warehoused in French ports. With bank financing he purchased the entire consignment and quietly transferred it into his Geneva cellars. With trans-Atlantic trade subsequently disrupted, Davidoff became, for a time, effectively the only dealer in Europe able to supply quality Havana cigars; his shop served clientele on both sides of the conflict and his reputation as a reliable source of fine tobacco spread internationally. From this period dates his frequent press epithet, "Mister Cigar".

=== Château series and the post-war boom ===
In 1946 Davidoff introduced what would become his most celebrated marketing innovation: a series of cigars named not for traditional Cuban factories but for the great Bordeaux Premier Cru estates. The line, manufactured for him in Havana by Hoyo de Monterrey and packaged in unadorned wood boxes, comprised the Château Haut-Brion, Château Lafite, Château Margaux, Château Latour and Château Yquem (joined later by Château Mouton-Rothschild). Marketed through Davidoff's network of European customers, the Château cigars associated the cigar with the language of fine wine and brought the Davidoff shop to the attention of a new international clientele.

By the 1950s and 1960s the shop had become a Geneva landmark whose customers included Marshal Tito, the violinist Isaac Stern, the pianist Artur Rubinstein, the actor Orson Welles, Baron Edmond de Rothschild and Gina Lollobrigida. The most notorious account in the shop's annals concerns the exiled King Farouk of Egypt, who, after extended negotiation and a credit check carried out in Rome, ordered some 40,000 Hoyo de Monterrey double coronas bearing his own custom band. Despite his admiration for Winston Churchill, Davidoff never numbered the British statesman among his customers.

=== Cubatabaco and the Davidoff brand ===
In 1967 Cubatabaco, the state monopoly that had taken control of Cuba's cigar industry after the Cuban Revolution, approached Davidoff with an unprecedented proposal: to roll a personal house brand bearing his name at the newly built El Laguito factory in Havana, which had been established the previous year to produce Castro's private Cohíba cigars. The first three vitolas — the Davidoff No. 1, the Davidoff No. 2 and the Ambassadrice, corresponding to the El Laguito No. 1, No. 2 and No. 3 formats — were released in 1968–1969, identifiable by a distinctive white band with gold lettering. The Davidoff No. 1 is widely regarded as the first commercially marketed Lancero. Further series followed during the 1970s, including the Mille (1976) and the Dom Pérignon (1977). Although Davidoff's name was closely identified with the Cuban brand and although he negotiated personally with the Cuban authorities, by his own admission he never met Castro.

In 1970, at the height of his career, Davidoff sold the business to the Basel-based family firm Oettinger AG, owned by his close friend Dr Ernst Schneider; the Geneva shop and the Davidoff trademark passed to Oettinger, while Davidoff himself remained as the brand's public ambassador for the rest of his life. The same period saw the company's expansion into pipe tobaccos (1972), cigarillos and accessories.

=== The Zino Davidoff Group ===
In 1980 the non-tobacco activities were spun off into a separate company, the Zino Davidoff Group, which began licensing the Davidoff name for luxury accessories. Davidoff cognac followed in 1986; Davidoff eyewear in 1988; the first Davidoff fragrance was launched in 1984, and the men's scent Cool Water, created by the perfumer Pierre Bourdon, in 1988. Public-health researchers have argued that this diversification — sometimes described as "brand stretching" — also served to keep the Davidoff name in advertising channels closed to tobacco products in many jurisdictions.

=== Break with Cuba ===
Through the late 1980s Davidoff grew increasingly dissatisfied with the consistency of the Cuban-rolled product, citing problems with draw, burn and construction. In 1987 he publicly criticised Cuban craftsmanship on French television. The dispute escalated until, in August 1989, Davidoff — together with representatives of Cubatabaco and Swiss customs officials — set fire to a stock of approximately 130,000 Cuban-made Davidoff cigars that he judged unfit for sale. The episode, sometimes called the "Davidoff bonfire", remains one of the most expensive symbolic acts of quality control in the history of the luxury trade.

The break with Cuba was made formal in 1990–1991. Production was transferred to the Dominican Republic in partnership with the producer Tabadom, owned by the Dominican-Swiss master blender Hendrik Kelner; the first Dominican-made Davidoff cigars were released in 1991, and the Château line was renamed Grand Cru.

== Writings ==
Davidoff was a prolific essayist on cigars and the art de vivre. His best-known work, Le livre du connaisseur de cigare — written in collaboration with the journalist Gilles Lambert and published in 1967 — appeared in English the same year as The Connoisseur's Book of the Cigar (McGraw-Hill, 92 pp.). A blend of practical guidance, anecdote and aphorism organised around the history of tobacco, the cultivation of the leaf in the Vuelta Abajo, and the etiquette of choosing, lighting, smoking and storing a cigar, the book has been translated into more than a dozen languages and has sold in excess of 200,000 copies. Among the directives for which it is best remembered is Davidoff's own credo:

Smoke less, but better and longer — make a cult of it, even a philosophy.

A separate essay on cigar etiquette, also from 1967, codified the do's and don'ts that have circulated under his name in the cigar press ever since.

== Personal life and character ==
Davidoff and his wife Marthe were, by all accounts, inseparable for sixty years; she worked alongside him at the shop and is said to have left it only once during their working life, to give birth to their daughter. Their daughter Sonia developed an allergy to tobacco in childhood and did not enter the family business. Davidoff was multilingual — Russian, French and Spanish and held both Argentine and Swiss citizenships acquired in the course of his early travels.

In person he was a small, dapper, white-haired figure invariably photographed with a Davidoff White Label between his fingers. He cultivated, and embodied, the persona of the cosmopolitan European bon vivant; the slogan he chose for his brand — "When you know" — reflected the discreet snobbery on which his commercial appeal rested. Late in life he is said to have remarked that he had spent his career "trading in dreams and illusions".

== Death and legacy ==
Davidoff died in Geneva on 14 January 1994 at the age of 87. He was buried in the Jewish Cemetery of Veyrier, on the Franco-Swiss border. Obituaries in The Independent, the Associated Press and The Jewish Chronicle, among others, described him as the most recognisable single figure in the post-war European cigar trade.

His name continues as the principal brand of Oettinger Davidoff AG of Basel, which today operates Davidoff of Geneva tobacconists in cities around the world and produces cigars in the Dominican Republic and Honduras. The Davidoff cigarette business was sold to Imperial Tobacco (now Imperial Brands) in 2006. The German cigar journalist Dieter H. Wirtz published a biography to mark the centenary of Davidoff's birth in 2006; the same year, Oettinger Davidoff issued a commemorative Zino Davidoff Centenary cigar.

Beyond the brand that bears his name, Davidoff is generally credited with three durable contributions to the modern cigar industry: the popularisation of the desktop humidor and climate-controlled retail storage; the use of fine-wine nomenclature and packaging to position the cigar as a luxury good rather than a commodity; and the codification — through his book and his shop — of a body of consumer etiquette for cigar smoking.

== Selected works ==
- Davidoff, Zino; Lambert, Gilles (1967). Le livre du connaisseur de cigare. Paris: Robert Laffont.
- Davidoff, Zino; Lambert, Gilles (1967). The Connoisseur's Book of the Cigar. Translated by Lawrence Grow. New York: McGraw-Hill. ISBN 0-07-015460-0.
- Wirtz, Dieter H. (2006). Zino Davidoff: A Life of Cigars (English ed.). Basel: Oettinger Davidoff.

== See also ==
- Davidoff
- Zino Davidoff Group
- Cohíba
- History of the Jews in Switzerland
- Cigar
