= Davidoff =

Swiss tobacco brand

- Industry: Tobacco
- Founder: Zino Davidoff
- Headquarters: Basel, Switzerland
- Products: Cigars and smoker's accessories
- Owner: Oettinger Davidoff AG
- Website: davidoff.com
- Footnotes / references Carcinogenicity: IARC group 1

Davidoff is a Swiss premium brand of cigars, cigarettes and smoker's accessories. The Davidoff cigarette brand has been owned by Imperial Brands after purchasing it in 2006. The non-cigarette portion of the Davidoff tobacco brand is owned by Oettinger Davidoff AG, which is based in Basel, Switzerland.

Oettinger Davidoff AG manufactures cigars, cigarillos, pipe tobaccos and smoker's accessories under the brands Davidoff, Camacho and Zino Platinum. The cigars are produced in the Dominican Republic and Honduras, and tobacco is sourced from the Dominican Republic, Nicaragua, Brazil, Peru, Mexico, Ecuador, Honduras and the United States of America.

== Name ==
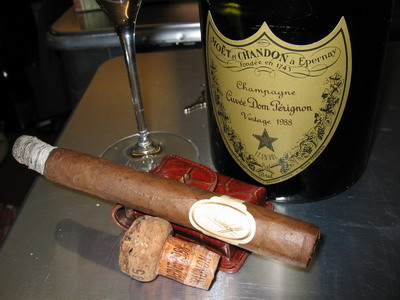
A Cuban-made Davidoff Dom Pérignon with its namesake, Dom Pérignon champagne

The brand name Davidoff originates from the surname of its Swiss-Jewish-born founder, Zino Davidoff (born Sussele-Meier (later russified into "Zinovy") Davidoff; 1906, Novhorod-Siverskyi – 1994, Geneva), who ran a tobacco specialist shop in Geneva, Switzerland, from 1926 to 1994. He was known as the "King of Cigars".

== History ==
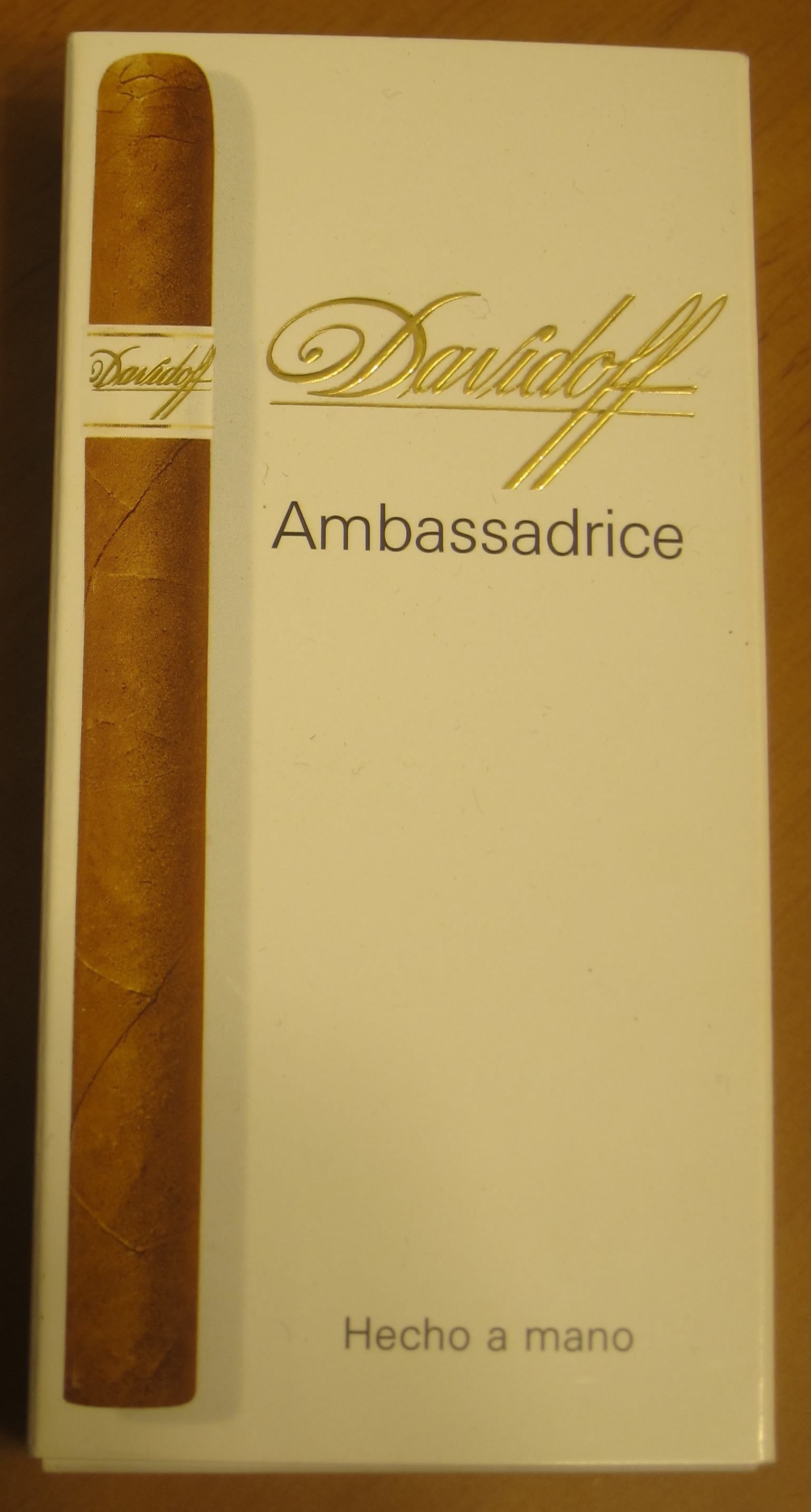
Dominican-made Ambassadrice

After the Second World War, Zino Davidoff decided to acquire a licence to produce his own series of cigars. In the 1930s, he married Martha Meyer, whose dowry helped him buy the store where he worked as a manager. As he had discerning international customers, he named the various formats of this "Château" cigar series after famous Bordeaux vineyard estates. The first in the series was the "Château Latour" in 1946.

In 1967, Zino Davidoff was approached by Cubatabaco, Cuba's state tobacco monopoly, about creating a line of cigars carrying the "Davidoff" name. The cigars were rolled in the newly established El Laguito factory in Havana, which had been established to roll Cuban President Fidel Castro's own personal cigars, named Cohíba.

In 1968, the first cigars carrying the name "Davidoff" were released. The first formats were the No. 1, the No. 2 and the Ambassadrice. In 1970, Oettinger AG, located in Basel, Switzerland, acquired the rights to the Davidoff trademark.

In 1971, the Davidoff "Mini Cigarillos" (short fillers made of 100% tobacco) and, in 1972, the first Davidoff pipe tobaccos were released. As of 1975, the cigars of the Château series were delivered in cabinets bearing the Davidoff logo.

In 1976, the "Mille Series" and, in 1977, the “Dom Pérignon” cigar, named after the champagne, were released. In 1986, a limited release of "Anniversario" cigars were produced, to celebrate Zino Davidoff's 80th birthday.

The Zino Davidoff Group was spun out of Davidoff in 1980 to exclusively market non-tobacco luxury goods such as watches, leather goods, pens, fragrances, eyewear, coffee, and cognac. Public health researchers have suggested that this was in order to engage in trademark diversification (also known as "brand stretching") to promote the tobacco products, because it allows for advertising the brand in the face of restrictions on the direct promotion of tobacco products.

After numerous disputes over quality and ownership rights, Zino Davidoff and Cubatabaco decided to end their relationship. Leading up to this, in August 1989, Zino had publicly burned over one hundred thousand cigars that he had deemed of low quality and unfit to sell. All Davidoff products produced in Cuba were officially discontinued in 1991. An agreement was signed that no more Davidoff cigars from Cuba would be sold.

In 1990, after discontinuing Cuban-made products, Davidoff started to produce cigars in the Dominican Republic. After numerous test runs, Zino Davidoff found a partner in the local producer “Tabadom”, owned by Hendrik Kelner.

In 1991, the first Dominican-made Davidoff cigars were launched, continuing the product lines and cigar formats of their Cuban predecessors. With the move to the Dominican Republic, the Château series was renamed "Grand Cru", and the individual formats were numbered instead of carrying the names of vineyard estates.

In 1991, the limited release called "Aniversario" became an ongoing cigar series, called the "Aniversario" series. In 1992, the "Special" cigar series was released, with the format "Special R" as the first product. In 1994, the 87-year-old Zino Davidoff died in Geneva, Switzerland.

A pack of Davidoff Classic cigarettes

== Cigarettes ==
Imperial Brands has owned the Davidoff cigarette brand name since purchasing it in 2006.

== See also ==
- List of cigar brands
- Zino Davidoff Group
