= Zino Davidoff Group =

Swiss luxury company

Zino Davidoff SA
- Trade name: Zino Davidoff Group
- Company type: Private
- Industry: Luxury goods
- Founded: 1980; 46 years ago in Basel, Switzerland
- Founder: Zino Davidoff
- Headquarters: Basel, Switzerland
- Area served: Worldwide
- Products: watches; leather goods; writing instruments; fashion accessories; cigars; cigarettes; cigar accessories; coffee; cognac; fragrances
- Brands: Cool Water
- Website: www.zinodavidoff.com

Zino Davidoff Group is the trading name of Zino Davidoff SA, a Swiss family business that was spun out of tobacco-product company Davidoff in 1980. It is active exclusively in the non-tobacco luxury goods segment and offers a range of upscale products.

== Overview ==
The company owns and manages the brand Davidoff for watches, leather goods, writing instruments, men's and women's fashion accessories (such as ties, foulards and cufflinks), fragrances, eyewear, coffee and cognac. Public health researchers have suggested that this was in order to engage in trademark diversification (also known as "brand stretching") to promote the tobacco products, because it allows for advertising the brand in the face of restrictions on the direct promotion of tobacco products.

The brand Davidoff is licensed to French-American company Coty, Inc. for the fragrances business, to Menrad for the eyewear business, to German coffee chain Tchibo for the coffee business, and to Thomas Hine & Co. for the cognac business.

== History ==
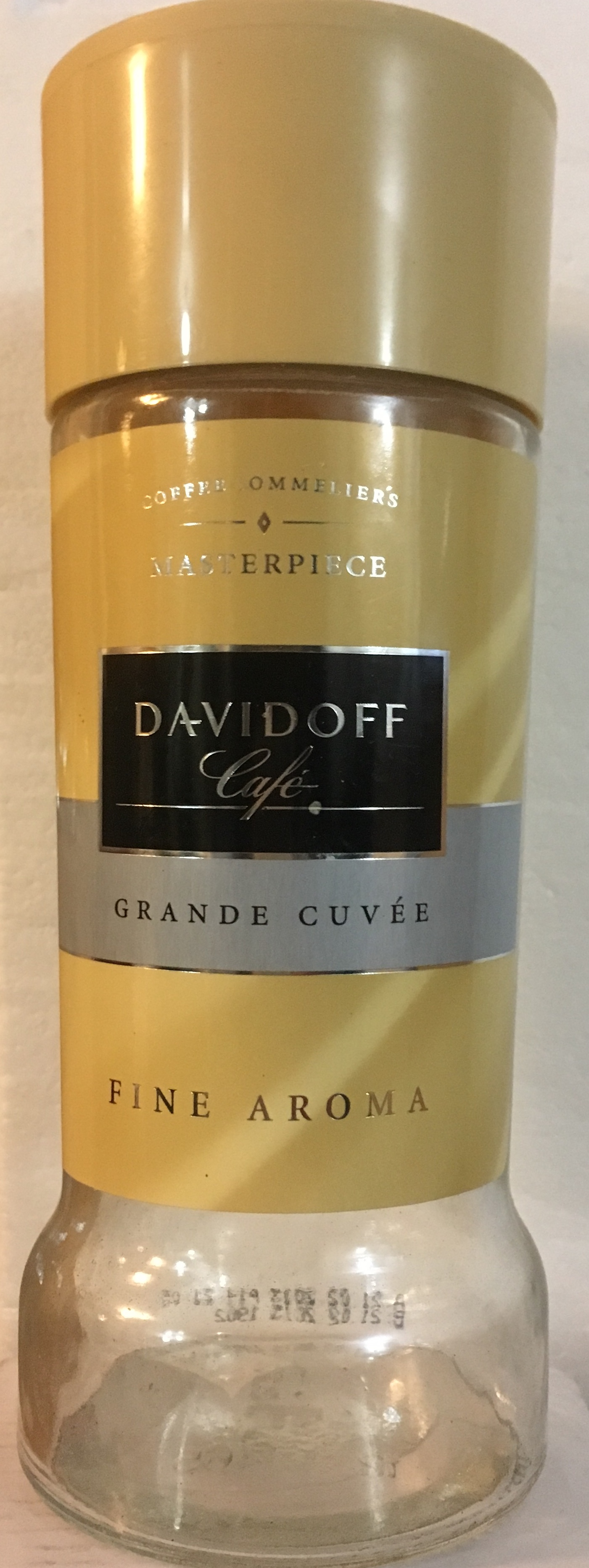
Davidoff Café bottle

The Zino Davidoff Group was founded in 1980 by Ukrainian-Jewish immigrant Zino Davidoff (born Sussele-Meier Davidoff), who lived in Switzerland.

The first Davidoff fragrance was launched in 1984. In 1988, the brand's most renowned fragrance, Davidoff Cool Water, was launched. It was created by Pierre Bourdon, and was one of the first fragrances for men to pioneer the aquatic theme and to offer a fresh and masculine fragrance.

In 1985, the first line of Davidoff ties was launched, and the first Davidoff watch came to the market. In 1986, the Davidoff cognac license started. In 1987, the first collection of Davidoff leather goods was launched. In 1988, the Davidoff eyewear license started.

In the 1990s, the Davidoff writing instruments and the Davidoff coffee were launched. At the beginning of the 2000s, the new Davidoff logo – the same which can be seen on the Davidoff products today – was implemented.

In 2005, the licenses for the luxury accessories products (such as leather goods, writing instruments and ties) were withdrawn from the former license partners. Zino Davidoff Group started to develop and commercialize directly these fashion accessories products bearing the brand name DAVIDOFF and added again a new watch collection. This first in-house collection was presented at BaselWorld Fair in 2008 under the name "Very Zino". Since 2008, Davidoff has presented three different watch collections to the market. In 2013, Davidoff launched their collection of luxury watches and accessories in the UK, which were distributed by Nuval.

== See also ==
- Davidoff
- Zino Davidoff
