= Elie Bleu =

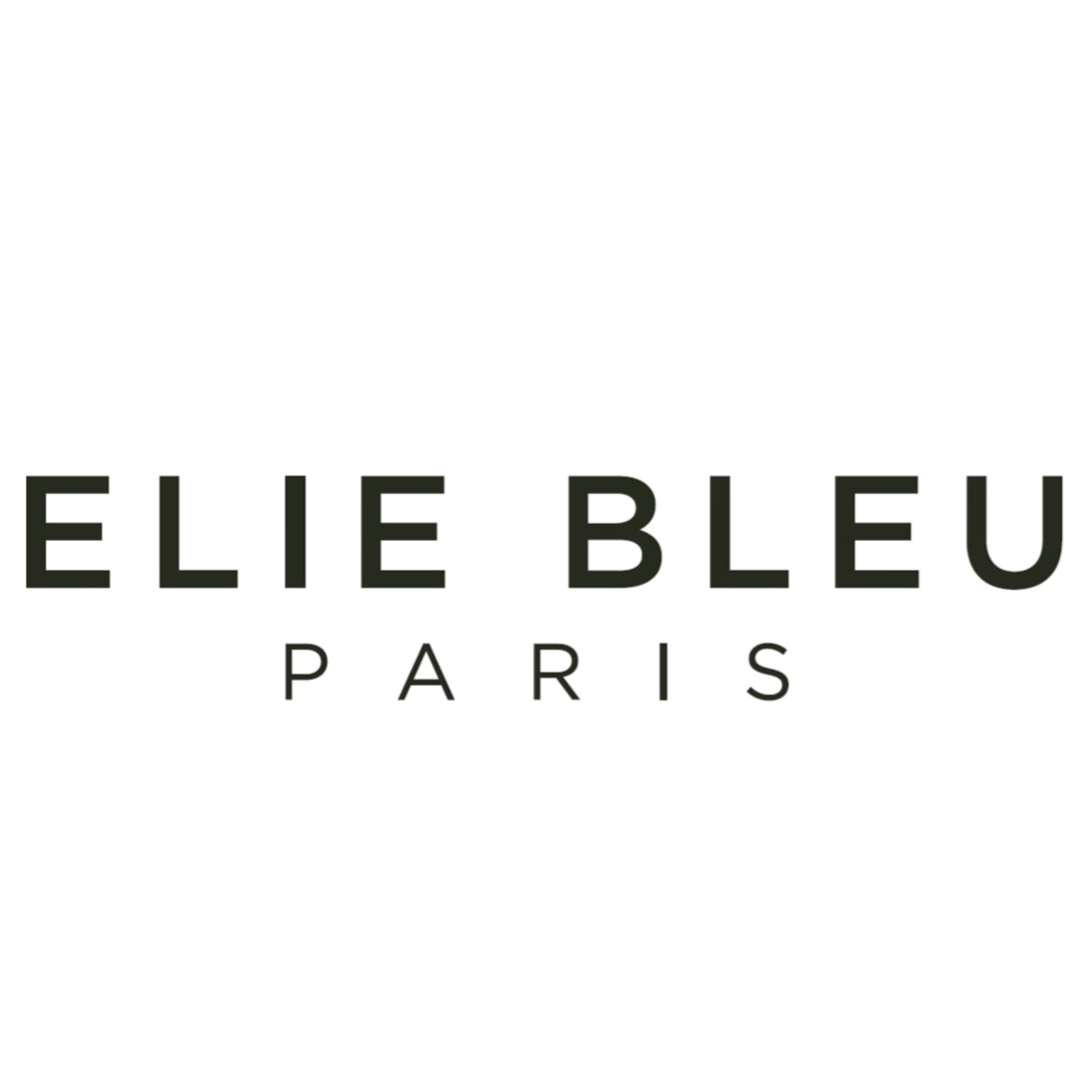
ELIE BLEU logo

Elie Bleu is a French manufacturer primarily of humidors watch boxes, games, and other cigar accessories such as cutters and lighters. The company was founded in 1976, however it did not become international until the early 90s. In 1997 they opened the first boutique in Paris, France in the 8th arrondissement, and only recently in 2020 relocated its boutique in the heart of the capital close to Boulevard St. Germain.

Elie Bleu is also committed to helping the environment and in 2019 partnered with NAUDET nurseries to plant a tree for every Elie Bleu product sold.

Notable models include Flor de Alba, Casa Cabana, Medaille, Vegas, and the Che Guevara.

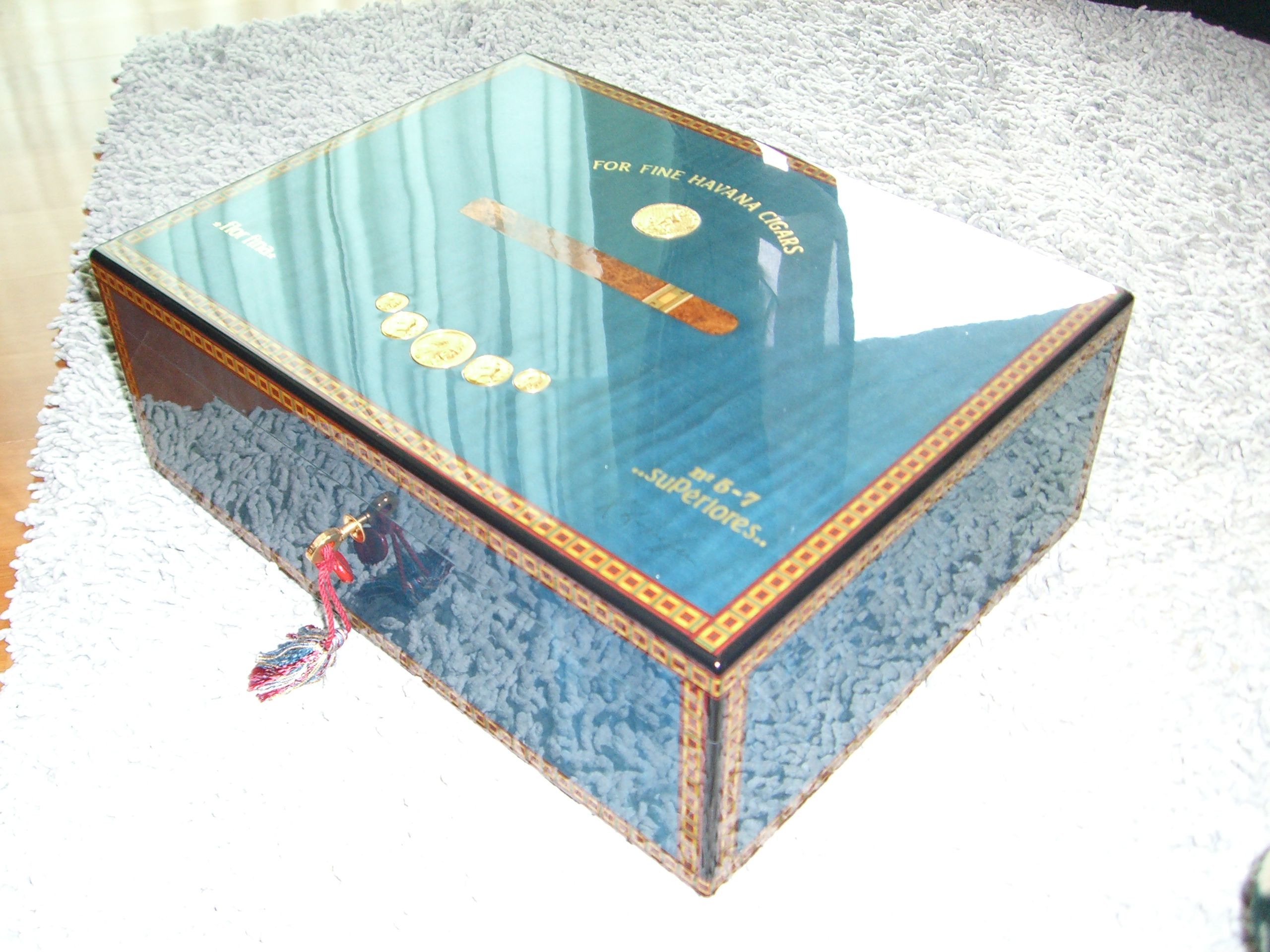
An Elie Bleu Medaille in blue
