= Real Fabrica de Tabacos Partagás =

Cigar factory

La Real Fabrica de Tabacos Partagás
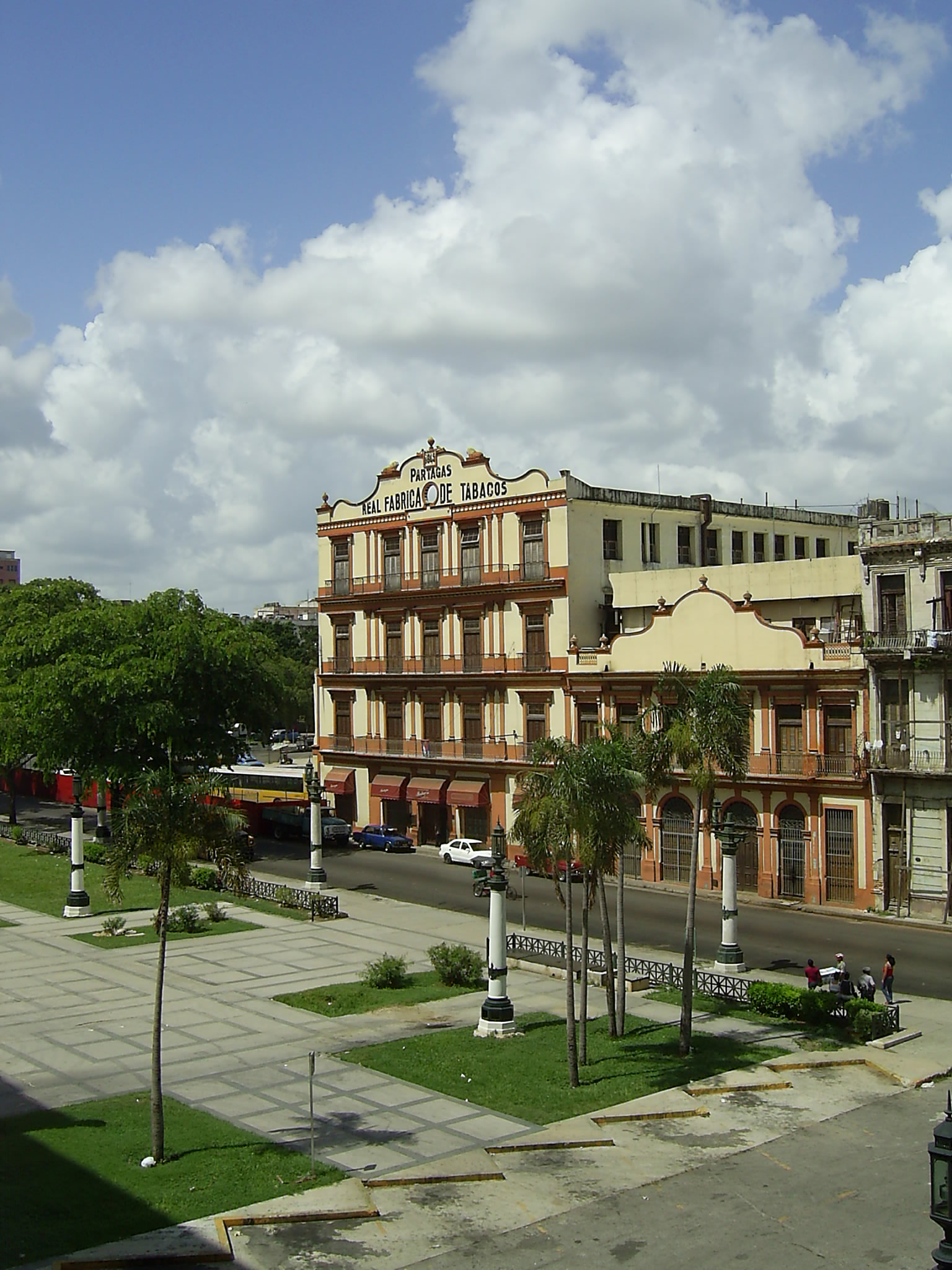
- Interactive map of the La Real Fabrica de Tabacos Partagás area
- Alternative names: The Royal Partagás Cigar Factory; The Francisco Pérez Germán Factory

General information
- Type: Cigar factory
- Location: Havana, Cuba
- Coordinates: 23.1344°N 82.3605°W
- Opened: 1845
- Owner: Jaime Partagás

La Real Fabrica de Tabacos Partagás, also known as The Royal Partagás Cigar Factory, is a cigar factory museum in Havana, Cuba. The world-famous habanos cigars are produced in this factory. Across the street from the massive Capitol building in Havana, it was one of Cuba's oldest cigar factories.

== Early history ==
In 1845, the Real Fabrica de Tabacos Partagás was established by Cantalonian entrepreneur Don Jaime Partagás. The Real Fabrica de Tabacos Partagás was housed in an industrial building in Havana, Cuba. The building stood out amongst its neighbours because of the ornate colorful maroon and cream exterior.

After a thorough fermenting process, tobacco leaves cultivated on Don Jaime's own Vuelta Abajo estates were sorted at the factory and graded for quality. The wrappers were divided into three classes based on their fineness: firsts, second, and thirds. Factory workers sat in long rows of wooden desks hand-rolling piles of loose tobacco leaves into traditional Cuban cigars of various sizes. An early custom of the factory involved an employee serving as a lector, a professional reader brought in to read aloud from books and newspapers.

While Don Jaime Partagás laid the foundation, it expanded into a global enterprise after his mysterious death on one of his tobacco plantations in 1868. After Don Jaime's death, the Partagás & Co. factory was passed on to his son Jose Partagás. On May 6, 1871, Jose Partagás put out a public announcement introducing a patented design and trademark on their cigar boxes in response to the counterfeit cigars manufactured in the United States.

By 1886, the factory employed 425 cigar makers.

Advertising of Real Fabrica de Tabacos Partagás

Later the factory and brand were sold to banker José A. Bances. In 1899, Bances joined forces with Ramón Cifuentes who eventually took over ownership with another partner in 1900, and the company grew under his stewardship. After Ramon Cifuentes' death, the Cifuentes family acquired the brand and production facility, renaming it Cifuentes y Cía. In 1960, the Castro administration nationalized the factory and its owners left Cuba. Following the Cuban Revolution, the factory was renamed Francisco Pérez Germán Factory.

=== Partagas brand ===
During a stay in Cuba in 1867, W. C. Prime, an editor of the Journal of Commerce, wrote about the early varieties of Partagás factory-made cigars which included Celestiales, Salomones, Napoleones, Imperiales, Embajadores, Cazadores, Rothchilds, Operas, Brevas, the Londres, and the Regalia Britannica.

The Partagás Visible Inmenso was manufactured in the factory and made exclusively for the late King Farouk of Egypt.

In addition to the Partagás brand, the factory produced Bolívar, Ramon Allones, and La Gloria Cubana cigars.

== See also ==
- El Laguito Cigar Factory
