= Trinidad (cigar) =

Cuban brand of cigars

- Product type: Cigar
- Current owner: Imperial Brands
- Produced by: Habanos S.A. Altadis
- Country: Cuba
- Introduced: 1969; 57 years ago

Trinidad is a Cuban brand of cigars, named after the city of Trinidad, Cuba. A production plant is located in Cuba and managed by the Cuban manufacturing company Habanos S.A., and a production plant is located in the Dominican Republic and managed by the Spanish manufacturing company Altadis which is a subsidiary of the British tobacco company Imperial Brands.

== History ==
According to Adriano Martinez, a former executive of Habanos S.A. giving testimony in Min Ron Nee's Illustrated Encyclopedia of Post-Revolution Havana Cigars, the Trinidad brand was first produced in 1969 at the El Laguito factory in Havana.

In the early 1990s, this type of cigar received attention in Cigar Aficionado after an interview with Avelino Lara (formerly the manager of El Laguito, and a producer of cigars for the Graycliff Hotel in Nassau, Bahamas, until his death on October 27, 2009). In the 1992 interview, Lara claimed that Trinidad was an exclusive brand that only Fidel Castro was authorized to hand out as diplomatic gifts. Lara also claimed the Trinidad cigars were of a higher quality than the much-famous Cohibas that had formerly been diplomatic exclusives before their mass-market release in 1982.

Two sources have contradicted Lara's claims: President Fidel Castro himself and Mr. Martínez. In an interview with Cigar Aficionado, when asked about Trinidad cigars, Castro stated that he only gave Cohibas away as diplomatic gifts. In his autobiography, My Life: A Spoken Autobiography, Castro claims to know very little about the Trinidad brand. In the Illustrated Encyclopedia, Martínez stated that Trinidads were actually a lower-level diplomatic gift than Cohiba cigars, made with a tobacco blend similar to that used in the Cohiba vitolas, but without the third barrel fermentation that Cohibas receive.

In 1995, Cigar Aficionado hosted the Dinner of the Century in Paris, France, where the guests became the first outside of diplomatic circles to taste the Trinidad cigars.

In February 1998, the Trinidad brand was released for public consumption at an opening ceremony in the Habana Libre Hotel in Havana. The initial release was only in one size: the Fundador. Though Martínez and others maintain that the blend did not change in the transition from a diplomatic gift to a mass-marketed cigar, the size did. The diplomatic Trinidads only came in one size, that of a Laguito No. 1 (the same as the Cohiba Lancero). The Fundador instead comes in a new size with a factory name of Laguito Especial, the same length as a Laguito No. 1 but with a ring gauge of 40 instead of 38.

In November 2003, at a black-tie dinner hosted by British importer Hunters & Frankau at the Hilton Park Lane in London, England, three new sizes were debuted for the Trinidad line: the Coloniale, the Reyes, and the Robusto Extra.

== Vitolas in the Trinidad Line ==
The following list of vitolas de salida (commercial vitolas) within the Trinidad marque lists their size and ring gauge in Imperial (and Metric), their vitolas de galera (factory vitolas), and their common name in American cigar slang.

Hand-Made Vitolas

- Coloniales - 5 1/4 × 44 in (133 × 17.46 mm), Colonial, a corona
- Fundadores - 7 1/2 × 40 in (191 × 15.88 mm), Laguito Especial, a lonsdale
- Reyes - 4 3/8 × 40 in (111 × 15.88 mm), Reyes, a petit corona
- Robusto Extra - 6 1/8 × 50 in (156 × 19.84 mm), Doble, a robusto extra
- Robusto T - 4 7/8 × 50 in (124 × 19.84 mm), Del Valle, a robusto

== Bibliography ==
- Min Ron Nee, An Illustrated Encyclopaedia of Post-Revolution Havana Cigars. Hong Kong: Interpro Business Corp., 2003.

== See also ==
- Cigar brands
