= Fowler Ltd. =

Sugar refining company

Fowler Ltd. or Fowler Limited was a sugar refining company headquartered in Blackwall, London, England.

== Early history ==
Fowler Bros & Co. was founded by Alexander and James Fowler of Port Glasgow, Scotland in 1871. The merchants turned up in Hornsey in the early 1880s. They started out making liquid invert sugars for breweries in London.

In 1881, the Fowler's established a small cane-sugar refinery based at Bow Creek on the banks of the River Lea in Blackwall. The treacle and syrup refiners Fowler Bros. & Ogilvie were listed in a trade journal as of 1883 as being at Orchard Place, Blackwall, 24 Mark Lane.

In 1902, Alexander Fowler formed Fowler Ltd. Around this time, a second refinery was built at No. 31 Orchard Place, a newly acquired, larger dock on the other side of the street, quickly replacing the earlier facility. Fowlers remained at the location until the 1970s.

In the 1950s, the company published recipe booklets with advice on the best uses for their products.

In 1976, Fowler Ltd. was bought out by Manbré and Garton, another sugar refining business. Tate & Lyle took over production of both Fowlers and Mabré and Garton in 1977.

== Products ==
- Fowler's West India Treacle
- Fowler's Pure Cane Golden Syrup
- Fowler's Golden Syrup Jelly

== See also ==
- Treacle
