= El Laguito Cigar Factory =

Cigar factory in Havana, Cuba

General information
- Type: Cigar factory
- Location: Playa, Havana, Cuba
- Opened: 1967; 59 years ago
- Client: Fidel Castro

El Laguito Cigar Factory is a Cuban factory building established by Fidel Castro in Havana, Cuba and recognized as the site where the Cohiba cigar was first manufactured.

== Early history ==
In the 1960s, the El Laguito factory was established by Fidel Castro with the help of Eduardo Ribera, a cigar maker. The factory was located in Havana, in the area of Playa. The property was described as a palm-fringed colonial-style home originally owned by an English family known for producing Fowler's West India Treacle.

=== Cohibas ===
The Cohiba, a trademark now owned by Habanos S.A., was conceived in the factory in February 1967. The varieties included Exquisitos, Lancero, Behike, and more.

In the mid-to-late 1960s, one of Castro's bodyguards was noticed smoking a noticeably aromatic but unbranded cigar. After locating the cigar maker, Eduardo Ribera, it was agreed to establish the El Laguito Factory which would eventually brand the cigars as Cohiba and become Castro's signature brand. Castro exclusively smoked the Cohibas before he gave up cigars for health reasons. The El Laguito factory-made Cohiba Lancero cigars were originally presented as diplomatic gifts for allied countries and friends of Castro.

=== Trinidad ===
The El Laguito factory produced a cigar brand called 'Trinidad' which included the Trinidad Fundadores and Trinidad Panatela. Trinidad Fundadores were exclusively produced at the factory starting in 1980. Diplomatic Trinidads were presented as gifts by the Cuban Government which included former President Fidel Castro, his Secretary of State, and other high-ranking Cuban diplomats.

== See also ==
- Royal Partagás Cigar Factory
