= Cool Water (perfume) =

Perfume

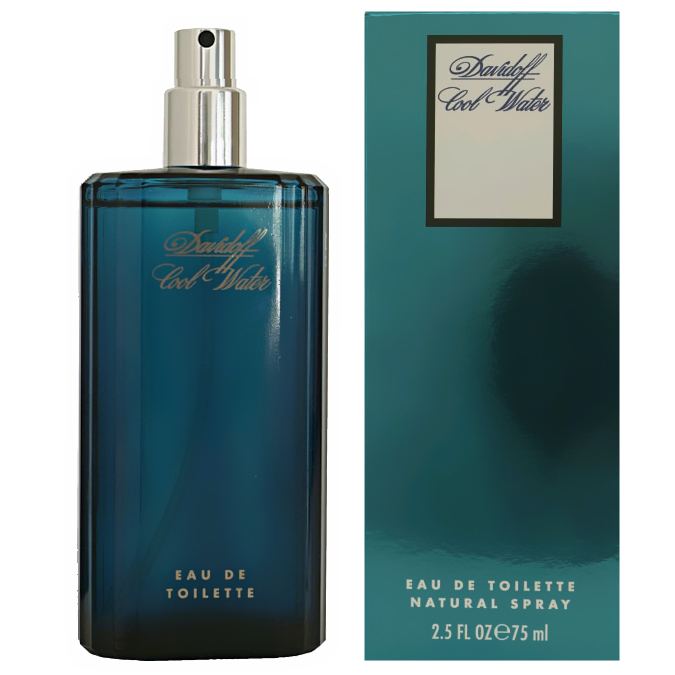
Davidoff Cool Water

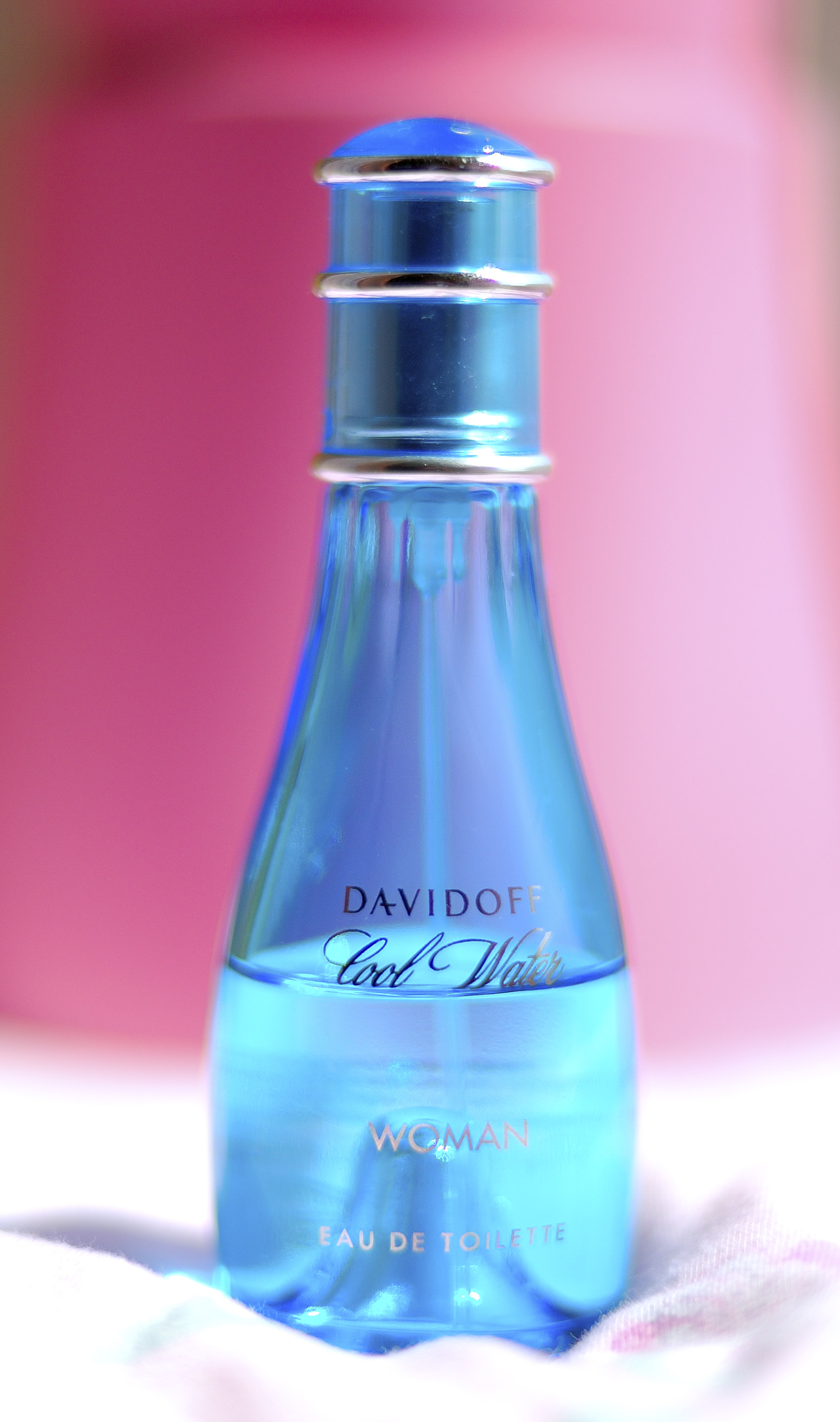
Davidoff Cool Water Women

Cool Water is a men's fragrance introduced in 1988 by Davidoff and produced under license by Coty Inc. as part of its Coty Prestige brand portfolio.

== Advertising ==
Lost star Josh Holloway, Paul Walker and Scott Eastwood are notable actors who appeared in Cool Water promotional material, featuring in a number of television commercials and posters for Davidoff Cool Water in 2008.

== Development ==
The perfumer is Pierre Bourdon. Cool Water contains mint, sea water and rosemary as top notes, lavender, jasmine, geranium and neroli as heart notes, and oakmoss, musk and sandalwood as base notes.

== Culture ==
A young Snoop Dogg shouted out Cool Water, Johnson & Johnson baby powder, and Oil of Olay as his fragrance routine on the classic 1993 hip hop album Doggystyle, on the track "Lodi Dodi".

== List of products ==
Davidoff has released numerous editions of the original Cool Water fragrance:

The Men's List (36 Perfumes)

1988 – 2010: The Classics & Early Summer Editions

• 1988: Cool Water (Original EDT).

• 2004: Cool Water Deep (Discontinued)

• 2004: Cool Water Frozen (Limited Edition)

• 2005: Cool Water Sea, Scents and Sun (Limited Edition)

• 2005: Cool Water Deep: Sea, Scents and Sun (Limited Edition)

• 2006: Cool Water Game

• 2006: Cool Water Summer Fizz (Limited Edition)

• 2006: Cool Water Deep Summer Fizz (Limited Edition)

• 2007: Cool Water Happy Summer (Limited Edition)

• 2007: Cool Water Game Happy Summer (Limited Edition)

• 2008: Cool Water Freeze Me (Limited Edition)

• 2009: Cool Water Cool Summer (Limited Edition)

• 2010: Cool Water Ice Fresh (Limited Edition)

2011 – 2019: Annual Summer & Modern Flankers

• 2011: Cool Water Summer Dive (Limited Edition)

• 2012: Cool Water Pure Pacific (Limited Edition)

• 2013: Cool Water Into The Ocean (Limited Edition)

• 2014: Cool Water Night Dive (Discontinued)

• 2014: Cool Water Coral Reef Edition (Limited Edition)

• 2015: Cool Water Summer Seas (Limited Edition)

• 2015: Cool Water National Geographic Pristine Seas (Limited Edition)

• 2016: Cool Water Exotic Summer (Limited Edition)

• 2016: Cool Water Ocean Extreme (Limited Edition)

• 2017: Cool Water Wave

• 2017: Cool Water Pacific Summer Edition (Limited Edition)

• 2018: Cool Water Caribbean Summer Edition (Limited Edition)

• 2018: Cool Water The Coolest Edition (30th Anniversary Limited Edition)

• 2019: Cool Water Summer Edition 2019 (Limited Edition)

• 2019: Cool Water Intense (Eau de Parfum)

2020 – 2026: Collector, Parfum & Reborn Era

• 2020: Cool Water Aquaman Collector Edition (Limited Edition)

• 2021: Cool Water Street Fighter Champion Summer Edition (Limited Edition)

• 2021: Cool Water Parfum

• 2022: Cool Water Grapefruit & Sage (Limited Edition)

• 2022: Cool Water Reborn (Eau de Toilette)

• 2023: Cool Water Oceanic Edition (Limited Edition)

• 2023: Cool Water Reborn Eau de Parfum

• 2024: Cool Water Reborn Intense

The Women's List (42 Perfumes)

1996 – 2010: The Original & Early Summer Editions

• 1996: Cool Water Woman (Original EDT)

• 2000: Cool Water Woman Energizing Cologne (Limited Edition)

• 2001 / 2004: Cool Water Woman Frozen Fragrance

• 2003: Cool Water Woman Ocean Radiance (Limited Edition)

• 2005: Cool Water Woman Sea, Scents and Sun (Limited Edition)

• 2006: Cool Water Game for Her

• 2006: Cool Water Woman Summer Fizz (Limited Edition)

• 2007: Cool Water Wave (Original)

• 2007: Cool Water Game Happy Summer for Her (Limited Edition)

• 2007: Cool Water Happy Summer Woman (Limited Edition)

• 2008: Cool Water Woman Freeze Me (Limited Edition)

• 2009: Cool Water Woman Cool Summer (Limited Edition)

• 2010: Cool Water Woman Ice Fresh (Limited Edition)

2011 – 2019: Annual Summer & Sea Rose Flankers

• 2011: Cool Water Woman Summer Dive (Limited Edition)

• 2012: Cool Water Pure Pacific for Her (Limited Edition)

• 2012: Cool Water Sensual Essence (Eau de Parfum)

• 2013: Cool Water Sea Rose (Original)

• 2013: Cool Water Woman Into The Ocean (Limited Edition)

• 2014: Cool Water Woman Night Dive

• 2014: Cool Water Woman Coral Reef Edition (Limited Edition)

• 2014: Cool Water Sea Rose Coral Reef Edition (Limited Edition)

• 2015: Cool Water Tender Sea Rose

• 2015: Cool Water Woman Summer Seas (Limited Edition)

• 2015: Cool Water Sea Rose Summer Seas (Limited Edition)

• 2016: Cool Water Woman Exotic Summer (Limited Edition)

• 2016: Cool Water Sea Rose Exotic Summer (Limited Edition)

• 2017: Cool Water Woman Pacific Summer Edition (Limited Edition)

• 2017: Cool Water Sea Rose Pacific Summer Edition (Limited Edition)

• 2018: Cool Water Woman Wave (Relaunch)

• 2018: Cool Water Woman Caribbean Summer Edition (Limited Edition)

• 2018: Cool Water Sea Rose Caribbean Summer Edition (Limited Edition)

• 2019: Cool Water Intense for Her (Eau de Parfum)

• 2019: Cool Water Woman Summer Edition 2019 (Limited Edition)

• 2019: Cool Water Sea Rose Summer Edition 2019 (Limited Edition)

2020 – 2026: Collector, Parfum & Reborn Era

• 2020: Cool Water Mera Collector Edition (Limited Edition)

• 2021: Cool Water Street Fighter Champion Summer Edition for Her (Limited Edition)

• 2021: Cool Water Parfum for Her

• 2022: Cool Water Jasmine & Tangerine (Limited Edition)

• 2022: Cool Water Reborn for Her (Eau de Toilette)

• 2023: Cool Water Oceanic Edition for Women (Limited Edition)

• 2023: Cool Water Reborn Eau de Parfum for Her

• 2024: Cool Water Reborn Intense for Her

In both of the lists, all are special editions of those respective years, except for the Original, Reborn, Parfum and Intense, that are still produced currently.
