= Humidor =

Humidity-controlled box or room for storing tobacco or cannabis

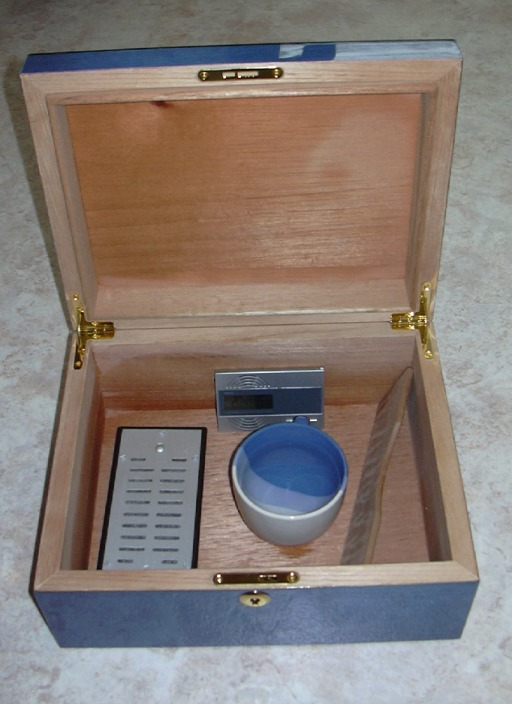
Humidor with hygrometer and bowl of water during initial seasoning

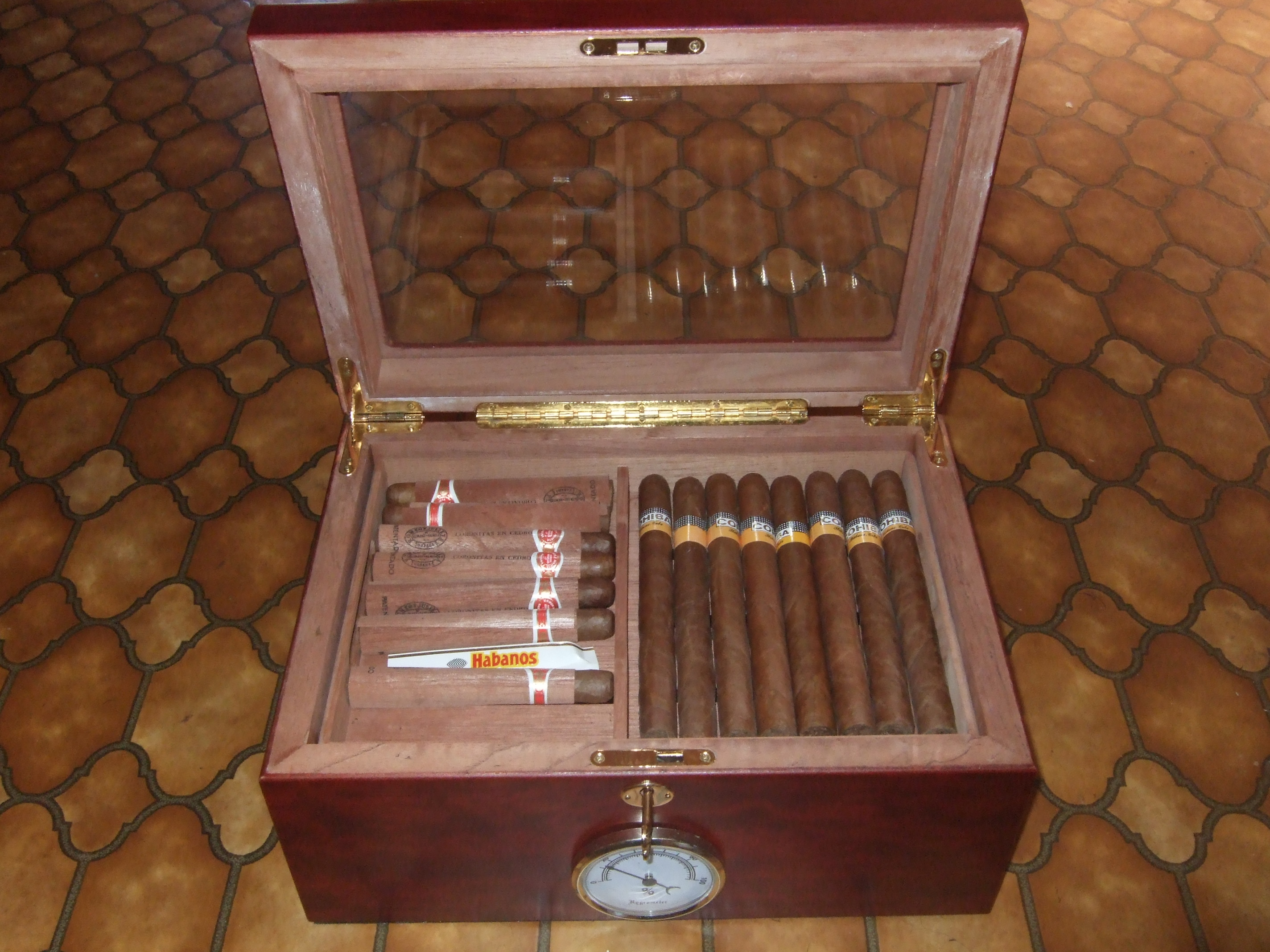
Humidor with cigars

A humidor is a humidity-controlled box or room used primarily for storing cigars, cigarettes, cannabis, or pipe tobacco. Either too much or too little humidity can be harmful to tobacco products; a humidor's primary function is to maintain a steady, desirable moisture level inside; secondarily it protects its contents from physical damage and deterioration from sunlight. For private use, small wooden boxes holding a few dozen or fewer cigars are common, while cigar shops may have walk-in humidors. Many humidors use hygrometers to monitor their humidity levels. When used and maintained properly, humidors can keep cigars fresh and in perfect condition for decades.

Another use for a humidor is controlling the moisture level in a baseball, which can have a pronounced effect on its response when hit with a baseball bat. This phenomenon was so great that in order to put an end to much controversy, in 2002, nine years after joining the league, the Colorado Rockies started storing their game balls in a large walk-in humidor at their home stadium, thus counteracting the effects of the low humidity due mainly to Denver's famous mile-high altitude of around 5,280 feet above sea level. After the change, various offensive and defensive statistics at Rockies home games, especially the number of home runs, were found to be more in line with the rest of the league. In 2018 the Arizona Diamondbacks, whose Phoenix home field is affected by the arid Sonoran Desert climate, became the second Major League Baseball team to use a humidor.

== Types ==
=== Walk-in ===
Most common in cigar bars or stores. One room is built as or converted to a humidor where all the cigars are stored.

=== Cabinet ===
Usually placed on the floor as a piece of furniture. It typically holds 1000–5000 cigars. A cabinet humidor is considered a good option for deep storage.

=== Desktop ===
The most common type of humidor. Typically box sized with lid on top or with one or more drawers. Vary in size from 25–500 cigars capacity. Zino Davidoff is credited as the inventor of the desktop humidor.

=== Travel ===
Portable, usually holding 2 to 20 cigars. Travel humidors must be especially durable and stand up to repeated openings.

=== Cannabis ===
Typically box sized that maintains 62% humidity level.

=== Electric ===
Similar to cabinet humidors, these are fully electronically controlled humidors and function similarly to a fridge. These models are generally the most expensive options on the market and come equipped with automated temperature and humidity control. Many models also come ready with LED display lights and touchscreen controls.

== Construction ==
Commercially made humidor cases are typically made of wood, although materials such as acrylic, glass, and metal are also used. Carbon fibre, silicon carbide, and polyethylene are rare. Aside from pleasing aesthetics, the casing's purpose is to protect the interior and create a closed environment, so any durable and airtight material can be used.

The interior is typically a veneer of Spanish cedar, a traditional material which possesses several desirable characteristics for cigar storage:

1. It holds more moisture than most woods, so it helps maintain humidity.
2. It is not prone to warping or cupping in high humidity.
3. It imparts its aroma to cigars. For the same reason, some cigars are wrapped in Spanish-cedar sheets before they are sold.
4. It can repel tobacco beetles, pinhead-sized pests which can ruin entire stocks of cigars by eating the tobacco and laying eggs, causing further infestation. They can also be discouraged by ensuring the humidor does not get hotter than 20 °C (68 °F). The beetle eggs usually only hatch at around 25 °C (77 °F), although there are also instances where they will hatch at cooler temperatures if the humidity is too high.

Humidors are typically commercially produced, though most walk-ins are custom built and some humidors are homemade. They range considerably in material, size and complexity. Capacity is determined by deducting the space required for the humidification element and some extra room between the element and the cigars. It can also be calculated online for the most popular cigar formats using a humidor calculator based on a database of the most common cigars.

== Maintenance ==
A humidor needs to be seasoned when new or having been out of use for a while. Wood in an unseasoned humidor will absorb moisture from within, drying stored cigars out. The preferred technique for bringing the wood close to an optimal relative humidity level where it will buffer moisture is placing a small container of distilled water inside the humidor for 1 to 3 days.

=== Humidity ===
Some humidors contain a permanent humidifying system which keeps the air moist, which in turn keeps the cigars moist. Without a humidor, within two to three days, cigars will quickly lose moisture and level up with the general humidity around them. The ideal relative humidity in a humidor is around 68–72%. Though it can vary slightly depending on the cigar smoker's preferences, it should never go higher than 75% due to the possibility of hatching tobacco beetles. The more empty space, the more readily the humidity level of the box will fluctuate.

Most humidifying elements are passive, releasing stored humidity through evaporation and diffusion. The use of a 50/50 solution of propylene glycol and distilled water is recommended for replenishing the passive humidifying element, as it has a buffering effect on air humidity, maintaining it at approximately 70%. Retailers and manufacturers claim propylene glycol also has mild antifungal and antibacterial properties; distilled water should always be used, due to its lack of minerals, additives, or bacteria.

Electronic humidifiers are also available, although usually reserved for very large humidors. A sensor measures the outside humidity and then activates a ventilator, which blows air over a humid sponge or water tank into the humidor. Once the preset humidity level has been reached the ventilator stops. This way electronic humidifiers can maintain a much more stable humidity level than passive humidifiers. Also they typically will activate an alarm to notify when the moisture supply needs refilling, to prevent humidity drops. The accuracy of electronic humidifiers depends primarily on the integrated type of sensor; the capacitive type are preferred.

Silica gel beads, familiar for removing moisture from packaging containers, are a third alternative. These are "calibrated" with a coating of mineral salts to absorb or release humidity in various RH ranges (including 65%, 68%, 70%, and 72%), providing a buffering effect on relative humidity. They require only distilled water when necessary, and can be ruined by propylene glycol.

Most humidors contain a hygrometer which is a device that can measure the humidity of the environment. Whether analogue or digital, these hygrometers can be used to measure the levels of humidity inside the humidor. Regardless, digital hygrometers tend to be more accurate when compared to the analogue ones.

=== Temperature ===
A humidor should never be exposed to direct sunlight. To discourage eggs of tobacco beetles from hatching and to prevent cigar rot, its internal temperature should be kept below 25 °C (77 °F), as well as below 75% relative humidity. At temperatures below 12 °C (54 °F), the desired ageing process of the cigars is impaired, making storage in wine cellars problematic.

== See also ==
- Tobacconist
