= Brand extension =

Marketing strategy

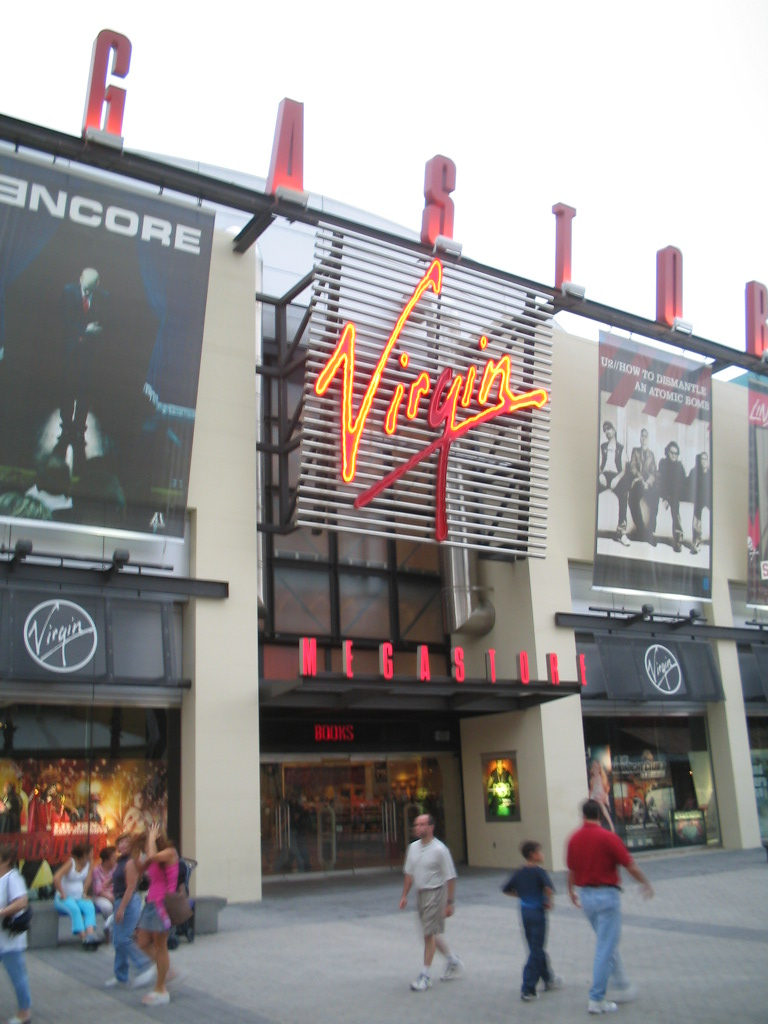
Virgin as a consumer goods brand

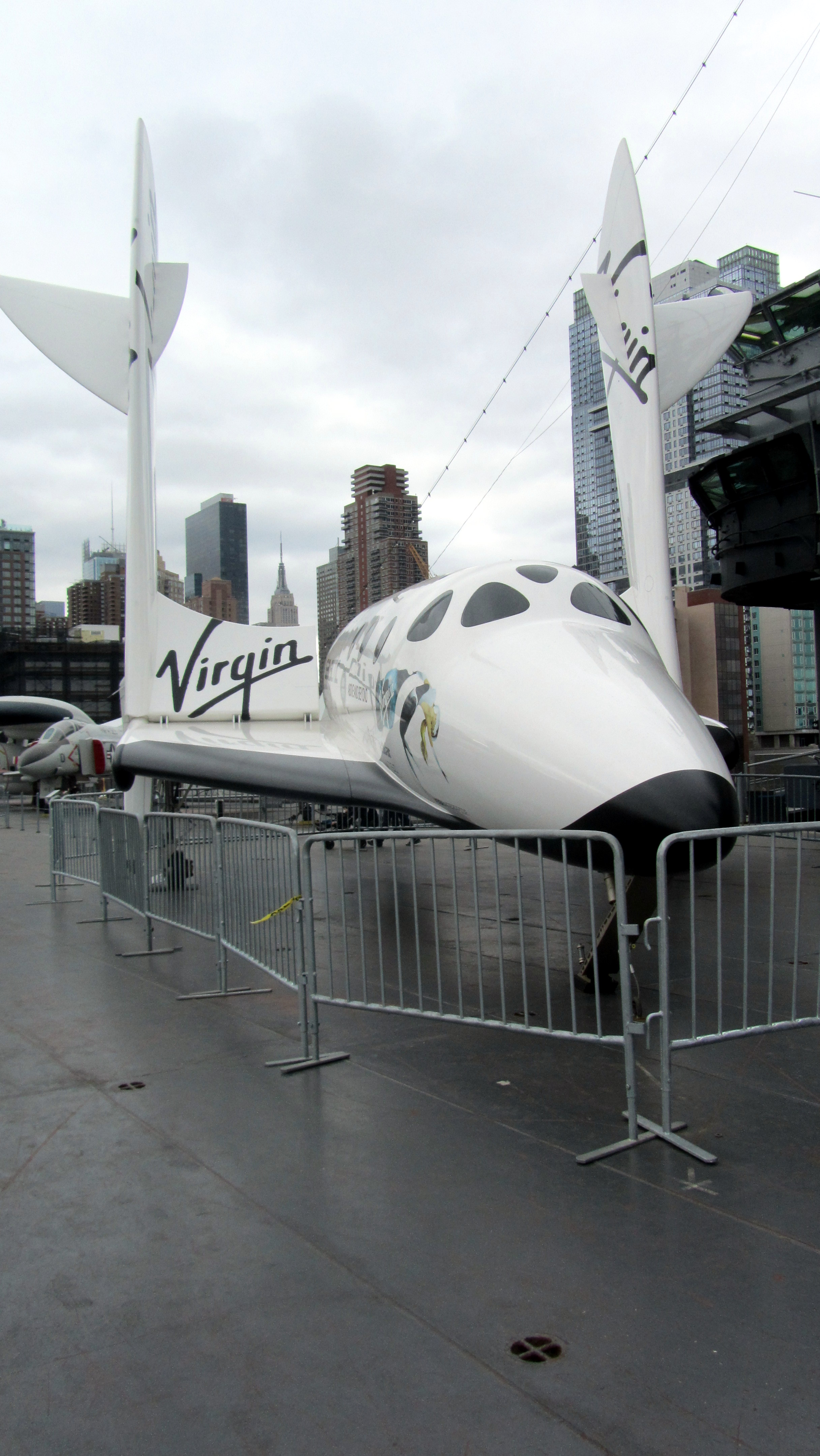
Virgin as an aerospace brand

Brand extension or brand stretching is a marketing strategy in which a firm marketing a product with a well-developed image uses the same brand name in a different product category. The new product is called a spin-off.

Organizations use this strategy to increase and leverage brand equity (definition: the net worth and long-term sustainability just from the renowned name). An example of a brand extension is Jello-gelatin creating Jello pudding pops. It increases awareness of the brand name and increases profitability from offerings in more than one product category.

In the 1990s, 81 percent of new products used brand extension to introduce new brands and to create sales. Launching a new product is time-consuming but also needs a big budget to create brand awareness and to promote a product's benefits. Brand extension is one of the new product development strategies which can reduce financial risk by using the parent brand name to enhance consumers' perception due to the core brand equity.

While there can be significant benefits in brand extension strategies, there can also be significant risks, resulting in a diluted or severely damaged brand image. Poor choices for brand extension may dilute and deteriorate the core brand and damage the brand equity. Most of the literature focuses on the consumer evaluation and positive impact on parent brand. In practical cases, the failures of brand extension are at higher rate than the successes. Some studies show that negative impact may dilute brand image and equity. In spite of the positive impact of brand extension, negative association and wrong communication strategy do harm to the parent brand even brand family.

A brand's "extendibility" depends on how strong consumer's associations are to the brand's values and goals. Ralph Lauren's Polo brand successfully extended from clothing to home furnishings such as bedding and towels. Both clothing and bedding are made of linen and fulfill a similar consumer function of comfort and hominess. Arm & Hammer leveraged its brand equity from basic baking soda into the oral care and laundry care categories. By emphasizing its key attributes, the cleaning and deodorizing properties of its core product, Arm & Hammer was able to leverage those attributes into new categories with success. Another example is Virgin Group, which was initially a record label that has extended its brand successfully many times; from transportation (aeroplanes, trains) to games stores and video stores such as Virgin Megastores.

Product extensions are versions of the same parent product that serve a segment of the target market and increase the variety of an offering. An example of a product extension is Coke vs. Diet Coke in the same product category of soft drinks. This tactic is undertaken due to the brand loyalty and brand awareness associated with an existing product. Consumers are more likely to buy a new product that has a reputable brand name on it than buy a similar product from a competitor without a reputable brand name. Consumers receive a product from a brand they trust, and the company offering the product can increase its product portfolio and potentially gain a larger share in the market in which it competes.

== Types ==
Brand extension research mainly focuses on consumer evaluation of extension and attitude toward the parent brand. In their 1990 model, Aaker and Keller provide a sufficient depth and breadth proposition to examine consumer behaviour and a conceptual framework. The authors use three dimensions to measure the fit of extension. First, the "Complement" refers to consumers taking two product classes (extension and parent brand product) as complementary in satisfying their specific needs. Secondly, the "Substitute" indicates two products have the same user situation and satisfy the same needs, which means the product classes are very similar and that the products can act to replace each other. Lastly, the "Transfer" describes the relationship between extension product and manufacturer which "reflects the perceived ability of any firm operating in the first product class to make a product in the second class" The first two measures focus on the consumer's demand and the last one focuses on the firm's perceived ability.

From the line extension to brand extension, however, there are many different types of extension such as "brand alliance", co-branding or "brand franchise extension". Tauber (1988) suggests seven strategies to identify extension cases such as product with parent brand's benefit, same product with different price or quality, etc. In his suggestion, it can be classified into two category of extension; extension of product-related association and non-product related association. Another form of brand extension is a licensed brand extension. In this scenario, the brand-owner works with a partner (sometimes a competitor), who takes on the responsibility of manufacturing and sales of the new products, paying a royalty every time a product is sold.

Brand extension can also be done through marketing strategies such as guerrilla marketing, where brands can promote their goods or services through unconventional means such as emotional connections to the brand by tackling social problems/dilemmas. These emotional connections are generally done through social experiments where brands express their concern and offer small solutions thereby making the brand standout and seem righteous. Guerilla marketing is a very effective way of connecting with the target market and reaching out to different markets, this extension into the vast demographic while creating brand awareness is highly effective for brands

== Categorization theory ==
Researchers tend to use "categorization theory" as their fundamental theory to explore the effects of brand extension. When consumers are faced with thousands of products to choose amongst, they are not only initially confused, but try to categorise by brand association or image given their knowledge and previous experience. A consumer can judge or evaluate the extension product with his or her category memory. Consumers categorise new information into specific brand or product class label and store it. This process is not only related to consumer's experience and knowledge, but also involvement and choice of brand. If the brand association is highly related to extension, consumer can perceive the fit among brand extension. Some studies suggest that consumer may ignore or overcome the dissonance from extension i.e. perceived misfit with parent brand is ignored, and does not cause dilution of parent's brand equity.

== Failure ==
Literature related to negative effect of brand extension is limited and the findings are revealed as incongruent. The early works of Aaker and Keller (1990) find no significant evidence that brand name can be diluted by unsuccessful brand extensions. Conversely, Loken and Roedder-John (1993) indicate that dilution effect do occur when the extension across inconsistency of product category and brand beliefs. The failure of extension may come from difficulty of connecting with parent brand, a lack of similarity and familiarity and inconsistent IMC messages.

"Equity of an integrated oriented brand can be diluted significantly from both functional and non-functional attributes-base variables", which means dilution does occur across the brand extension to the parent brand. These failures of extension make consumers create a negative or new association relate to parent brand even brand family or to disturb and confuse the original brand identity and meaning.

In addition, Martinez and de Chernatony (2004) classify the brand image in two types: the general brand image and the product brand image. They suggest that if the brand name is strong enough as Nike or Sony, the negative impact has no specific damage on general brand image and "the dilution effect is greater on product brand image than on general brand image". Consequently, consumers may maintain their belief about the attributes and feelings about parent brand, however their study does show that "brand extension dilutes the brand image, changing the beliefs and association in consumers' mind".

The flagship product is a money-spinner to a firm. Marketers spend time and money to maximise exposure and awareness of the product. In theory, a flagship product has the top sales and highest awareness in its product category. In spite of Aaker and Keller's (1990) research, which reports that prestigious brands are not harmed from failure of extensions, some evidence shows that the dilution effect has great and instant damage to the flagship product and brand family. Still, some studies suggest that even though overall parent belief is diluted; the flagship product would not be harmed. In addition, brand extension also "diminish[es] consumer's feelings and beliefs about brand name." To establish a strong brand, it is necessary to build up a "brand ladder".

Marketers may follow the order and model created by Aaker and Keller who are authorities on brand management, but branding does not always follow a rational line. One mistake can damage all brand equity. A classic extension failure example would be Coca-Cola launching "New Coke" in 1985. Although it was initially accepted, a backlash against "New Coke" soon emerged among consumers. Not only did Coca-Cola not succeed in developing a new brand but sales of the original flavour also decreased. Coca-Cola had to make considerable efforts to regain customers who had turned to Pepsi cola.

Although there are few works about the failure of extensions, literature provides sufficient in-depth research into this issue. Studies also suggest that brand extension is a risky strategy to increase sales or brand equity. It should consider the damage of parent brand no matter what types of extension are used.

== Brand equity ==
Brand equity is defined as the main concern in brand management and IMC campaign. Every marketer should pursue the long term equity and pay attention to every strategy in detail. Because a small message dissonance would cause great failure of brand extension. On the other hand, consumer has his psychology process in mind. The moderating variable is a useful indication to evaluate consumer evaluation of brand extension.

Throughout the categorisation theory and associative network theory, a consumer has the ability to process information into useful knowledge for them. They would measure and compare the difference between core brand and extension product through quality of core brand, fit in category, former experience and knowledge, and difficulty of making. Consequently, in this article, we may conclude the following points about consumer evaluation of brand extension:

1. Quality of core brand creates a strong position for brand and low impact of fit in consumer evaluation.
2. Similarity between core brand and extension is the main concern of consumer perception of fit. The higher the similarity is, the higher perception of fit will be.
3. Consumer's knowledge and experience affect the evaluation before extension product trail.
4. The more innovation of extension product is, the greater positive fit can perceive.

A successful brand message strategy relies on a congruent communication and a clear brand image. The negative impact of brand extension would cause a great damage to parent brand and brand family. From a manager and marketer's perspective, an operation of branding should maintain brand messages and associations within a consistency and continuum in the long way. Because the effects of negative impact from brand extension are tremendous and permanently. Every messages or brand extension can dilute the brand in nature.

== See also ==
- Spin-off (media), the process of deriving new radio programs, television programs or video games or even novels from already existing ones
- WWE brand extension
