= List of perfumes =

This is a list of some of the most widely known commercially available perfumes from the 14th century onwards, sortable by column heading.

| Year | Name | Company | Perfumer | Ref. |
|---|---|---|---|---|
| 14th century | Hungary water | | unknown | |
| 14th century | Carmelite Water | | unknown | |
| 1709 | Eau de Cologne | Farina gegenüber | Johann Maria Farina (1685–1766) | |
| 1772 | Number Six | Caswell-Massey | William Hunter (1730–1777) | |
| 1803 | 4711 Eau de Cologne | Mäurer & Wirtz | Wilhelm Mülhens | |
| 1806 | Jean Marie Farina | Roger & Gallet | Jean Marie Joseph Farina | |
| 1808 | Florida Water | Lanman & Kemp Barclay | Robert I. Murray | |
| 1815 | Freshman | Truefitt & Hill | Francis Truefitt | |
| 1840 | Jockey Club | Caswell-Massey | Rowland R. Hazard (1792–1874) | |
| 1853 | Eau de Cologne Impériale | Guerlain | Pierre-François-Pascal Guerlain | |
| 1882 | Fougère Royale | Houbigant Parfum | Paul Parquet | |
| 1889 | Jicky | Guerlain | Aimé Guerlain | |
| 1889 | Shipr | Brocard and Co. (now Novaya Zarya) | Henri Brocard (parfumeur) | |
| 1893 | Vera Violetta | Roger & Gallet | Henri Roger (1845–1906) | |
| 1896 | Trèfle Incarnat | L.T. Piver | Auguste Darzens | |
| 1904 | La Rose Jacqueminot | Coty | François Coty | |
| 1905 | L'Origan | Coty | François Coty | |
| 1905 | Ambre Antique | Coty | François Coty | |
| 1906 | Après l'Ondée | Guerlain | Jacques Guerlain | |
| 1911 | Narcisse Noir | Parfums Caron | Ernest Daltroff | |
| 1912 | L'Heure Bleue | Guerlain | Jacques Guerlain | |
| 1912 | Quelques Fleurs | Houbigant Parfum | Robert Bienaimé | |
| 1913 | Bouquet de Catherine | Rallet | Ernest Beaux | |
| 1913 | Nuit de Chine | Parfumes de Rosine | Maurice Schaller | |
| 1917 | Chypre de Coty | Coty | François Coty | |
| 1919 | Mitsouko | Guerlain | Jacques Guerlain | |
| 1921 | N°5 | Chanel | Ernest Beaux | |
| 1921 | Émeraude (fragrance) | Coty | François Coty | |
| 1922 | N°22 | Chanel | Ernest Beaux | |
| 1922 | Nuit de Noël | Parfums Caron | Ernest Daltroff | |
| 1923 | Rallet No. 1 | Rallet | Ernest Beaux | |
| 1925 | Knize Ten | Kniže & Comp. | François Coty and Vincent Roubert | |
| 1925 | Krasnaya Moskva | Novaya Zarya | | |
| 1925 | Shalimar | Guerlain | Jacques Guerlain | |
| 1926 | Bois des Îles | Chanel | Ernest Beaux | |
| 1927 | Arpège | Lanvin | André Fraysse and Paul Vacher | |
| 1927 | Cuir de Russie | Chanel | Ernest Beaux | |
| 1930 | Joy | Patou | Henri Alméras | |
| 1931 | Un Parfum d'Aventure | L.T. Piver | | |
| 1932 | Je Reviens | Worth | Maurice Blanchet | |
| 1932 | Tabu | Dana | Jean Carles | |
| 1933 | Vol de Nuit (fragrance) | Guerlain | Jacques Guerlain | |
| 1933 | Jungle Gardenia | Tuvaché | Bernadine Angus | |
| 1934 | Blue Grass | Elizabeth Arden, Inc. | Henri Alméras | |
| 1934 | Pour un Homme | Parfums Caron | Ernest Daltroff | |
| 1938 | Old Spice | Shulton Company | Bert Hauck | |
| 1939 | Cuir de Russie | L.T. Piver | | |
| 1940 | Snuff | Schiaparelli | | |
| 1944 | Femme (fragrance) | Rochas | Edmond Roudnitska | |
| 1944 | Bandit (fragrance) | Robert Piguet | Germaine Cellier | |
| 1945 | White Shoulders | Evyan Perfumes | Walter Langer | |
| 1946 | Ma Griffe | Carven | Jean Carles | |
| 1946 | Silvestre | Victor | | |
| 1947 | Miss Dior | Parfums Christian Dior | Jean Carles and Paul Vacher | |
| 1945 | Vent Vert | Balmain | Germaine Cellier | |
| 1948 | Fracas | Robert Piguet | Germaine Cellier | |
| 1948 | L'Air du Temps | Nina Ricci | Françis Fabron | |
| 1952 | Wind Song | Prince Matchabelli | Georges V. Matchabelli | |
| 1953 | Youth-Dew | Estée Lauder Companies | Joséphine Catapano | |
| 1955 | Intimate | Revlon | Ernest Shiftan | |
| 1955 | Pour Monsieur | Chanel | Henri Robert | |
| 1956 | Diorissimo | Parfums Christian Dior | Edmond Roudnitska | |
| 1957 | L'Interdit (original) | Parfums Givenchy | Françis Fabron | |
| 1957 | Vétiver | Carven | Edouard Hache | |
| 1959 | Cabochard | Parfums Grès | Bernard Chant | |
| 1959 | Tabac | Mäurer & Wirtz | | |
| 1960 | Madame Rochas | Rochas | Guy Robert | |
| 1961 | Vétiver (fragrance) | Guerlain | Jean-Paul Guerlain | |
| 1961 | Calèche (fragrance) | Hermès | Guy Robert | |
| 1963 | Aramis | Estée Lauder Companies | Bernard Chant | |
| 1964 | Brut | Fabergé | Jean Carles | |
| 1964 | Y | Yves Saint Laurent (fashion house) | Michel Hy | |
| 1965 | Habit Rouge | Guerlain | Jean-Paul Guerlain | |
| 1966 | Eau Sauvage | Parfums Christian Dior | Edmond Roudnitska | |
| 1966 | Fidji | Guy Laroche | Joséphine Catapano | |
| 1968 | Estée | Estée Lauder Companies | Bethy Bussé | |
| 1968 | Norell | Norman Norell and Revlon | Joséphine Catapano | |
| 1969 | Ô | Lancôme | Robert Gonnon | |
| 1969 | Calandre | Paco Rabanne (brand) | Michael Hy | |
| 1969 | Chamade | Guerlain | Jean-Paul Guerlain | |
| 1970 | No. 19 | Chanel | Henri Robert | |
| 1971 | Aromatics Elixir | Clinique | Bernard Chant | |
| 1971 | Rive Gauche | Yves Saint Laurent (fashion house) | Jacques Polge and Michael Hy | |
| 1972 | Aliage (also named Alliage) | Estée Lauder Companies | Francis Camail and Bernard Chant | |
| 1972 | Diorella (fragrance) | Parfums Christian Dior | Edmond Roudnitska | |
| 1972 | Jovan Musk | Jōvan | Denis McAdam and Murray Moscona | |
| 1973 | Charlie | Revlon | Francis Camail and Harry A. Cuttler | |
| 1973 | Ciara | Revlon | Harry A. Cuttler | |
| 1973 | Coriandre | Jean Couturier | Jacqueline Couturier, Jean-Louis Sieuzac, and Gerard Pelpel | |
| 1973 | Pour Homme | Paco Rabanne (brand) | Jean Martel | |
| 1973 | Private Collection | Estée Lauder Companies | Vincent Marcello | |
| 1973 | Tea Rose | The Perfumer's Workshop | Léon Hardy and Annie Buzantian | |
| 1974 | Cristalle | Chanel | Henri Robert | |
| 1974 | Eau de Guerlain | Guerlain | Jean-Paul Guerlain | |
| 1974 | Gentleman | Givenchy | Paul Leger | |
| 1975 | Chloé | Lagerfeld | Bethy Bussé | |
| 1975 | Halston | Halston | Bernard Chant and Max Gavarry | |
| 1976 | First | Van Cleef & Arpels | Jean-Claude Ellena | |
| 1976 | Z-14 | Halston | Vincent Marcello and Bernard Chant | |
| 1977 | Opium | Yves Saint Laurent (fashion house) | Jean-Louis Sieuzac | |
| 1977 | Oscar | Oscar de la Renta | Jean-Louis Sieuzac | |
| 1978 | Lauren | Ralph Lauren Corporation | Bernard Chant | |
| 1978 | Anaïs Anaïs | Cacharel | Raymond Chaillan, Roger Pellegrino | |
| 1978 | Azzaro pour Homme | Azzaro | Gerard Anthony, Martin Heiddenreich, Richard Wirtz | |
| 1978 | Polo | Ralph Lauren Corporation | Carlos Benaim | |
| 1978 | Pour Homme | Van Cleef & Arpels | Louis Monnet | |
| 1978 | White Linen | Estée Lauder Companies | Ernest Shiftan and Sophia Grojsman | |
| 1979 | Nahéma | Guerlain | Jean-Paul Guerlain and Anne-Marie Saget | |
| 1980 | Ivoire | Balmain | Francis Camail | |
| 1981 | Kouros | Yves Saint Laurent (fashion house) | Pierre Bourdon | |
| 1981 | Must de Cartier | Cartier | Jean-Jacques Diener | |
| 1981 | Nombre Noir | Shiseido | Jean-Yves Leroy | |
| 1981 | Antaeus | Chanel | Jacques Polge | |
| 1981 | Giorgio | Giorgio Beverly Hills | Francis Camail | |
| 1981 | Ombre Rose | Jean-Charles Brosseau | Françoise Caron and Pierre Bourdon | |
| 1982 | Vanderbilt | Gloria Vanderbilt | Sophia Grojsman | |
| 1982 | Drakkar Noir | Guy Laroche | Pierre Wargnye | |
| 1982 | Trussardi | Trussardi | | |
| 1983 | Paris (fragrance) | Yves Saint Laurent (fashion house) | Sophia Grojsman | |
| 1984 | Antonia's Flowers | Antonia's Flowers | Bernard Chant and Joséphine Catapano | |
| 1984 | Coco | Chanel | Jacques Polge | |
| 1984 | Lumière | Rochas | | |
| 1984 | Paloma Picasso | Paloma Picasso | Francis Bocris | |
| 1984 | Ysatis | Givenchy | Dominique Ropion | |
| 1985 | Beautiful | Estée Lauder Companies | Bernard Chant, Carlos Benaim, Nicholas Calderone, Max Gavarry, and Sophia Grojsman | |
| 1985 | Obsession | Calvin Klein (fashion house) | Robert Slattery | |
| 1985 | Poison | Parfums Christian Dior | Édouard Fléchier | |
| 1986 | Zino Davidoff | Zino Davidoff Group | | |
| 1986 | Xeryus | Parfums Givenchy | Alberto Morillas | |
| 1986 | Calyx | Prescriptives | Sophia Grojsman | |
| 1987 | Byzance | Rochas | Nicolas Mamounas and Alberto Morillas | |
| 1987 | LouLou | Cacharel | Jean Guichard | |
| 1987 | Passion | Elizabeth Taylor | James Bell and René Morgenthaler | |
| 1988 | Boucheron | Boucheron | Francis Deleamont and Jean-Pierre Bethouart | |
| 1988 | Cool Water | Zino Davidoff Group | Pierre Bourdon | |
| 1988 | Fahrenheit | Parfums Christian Dior | Jean-Louis Sieuzac, Maurice Roger | |
| 1988 | Eternity | Calvin Klein (fashion house) | Sophia Grojsman | |
| 1988 | Knowing | Estée Lauder Companies | Harry Frémont | |
| 1989 | Red Door | Elizabeth Arden, Inc. | Carlos Benaim and Olivier Gillotin | |
| 1989 | Samsara | Guerlain | Jean-Paul Guerlain | |
| 1990 | Cabotine | Grès | Jean Claude Delville | |
| 1990 | Globe | Rochas | Jean-Claude Ellena | |
| 1990 | New West Skinscent for Her | Estée Lauder Companies, Aramis division | Annie Buzantian and Harry Frémont | |
| 1990 (reimagined from 1953 original) | Trésor (fragrance) | Lancôme | Sophia Grojsman | |
| 1990 | Égoïste | Chanel | Jacques Polge | |
| 1990 | Safari | Ralph Lauren Corporation | Dominique Ropion | |
| 1991 | Kenzo pour Homme | Kenzo | Christian Mathieu | |
| 1991 | Dune | Parfums Christian Dior | Jean-Louis Sieuzac, Nejla Barbir, and Dominique Ropion | |
| 1991 | Amarige | Parfums Givenchy | Dominique Ropion | |
| 1991 | Spellbound | Estée Lauder Companies | Sophia Grojsman | |
| 1991 | White Diamonds | Elizabeth Taylor | Carlos Benaim and Olivier Gillotin | |
| 1992 | Angel | Thierry Mugler | Olivier Cresp | |
| 1992 | Bois de Violette | Serge Lutens | Christopher Sheldrake | |
| 1992 | Casmir | Chopard | Michel Almairac | |
| 1992 | L'eau d'Issey | Issey Miyake | Jacques Cavallier | |
| 1992 | Féminité du Bois | Shiseido-Serge Lutens | Christopher Sheldrake and Pierre Bourdon | |
| 1993 | Eau de Rochas Homme | Rochas | | |
| 1993 | Ambre Sultan | Serge Lutens | Christopher Sheldrake | |
| 1993 | Classique | Jean Paul Gaultier | Jacques Cavallier | |
| 1993 | XS pour Elle | Paco Rabanne (brand) | Gerard Anthony | |
| 1993 | Yvresse | Yves Saint Laurent (fashion house) | Sophia Grojsman | |
| 1994 | Blue Jeans & Red Jeans | Versace | | |
| 1994 | CK One | Calvin Klein (fashion house) | Alberto Morillas and Harry Frémont | |
| 1994 | Tocade | Rochas | Harry Fremont and Alberto Morillas | |
| 1994 | Eden (fragrance) | Cacharel | | |
| 1994 | Miss Arpels | Van Cleef & Arpels | | |
| 1995 | 24, Faubourg | Hermès | Maurice Roucel | |
| 1995 | Pleasures | Estée Lauder Companies | Alberto Morillas and Annie Buzantian | |
| 1995 | Kouros Fraicheur | Yves Saint Laurent (fashion house) | | |
| 1996 | Acqua di Giò | Armani | Alberto Morillas and Jacques Cavallier | |
| 1995 | Le Mâle | Jean Paul Gaultier | Francis Kurkdjian | |
| 1996 | Angel Men/A*Men | Thierry Mugler | Jacques Huclier | |
| 1996 | Dirt | Demeter Fragrance Library | Jodi Wilson | |
| 1996 | Dolce Vita (fragrance) | Parfums Christian Dior | Pierre Bourdon and Maurice Roger | |
| 1996 | Allure (fragrance) | Chanel | Jacques Polge | |
| 1996 | Tommy Girl | Tommy Hilfiger Corporation | Calice Becker | |
| 1996 | Encens et Lavande | Serge Lutens | | |
| 1997 | Envy | Gucci | Maurice Roucel | |
| 1997 | Happy | Clinique | Rodrigo Flores-Roux and Jean-Claude Delville | |
| 1997 | Lolita Lempicka | Lolita Lempicka | Annick Ménardo | |
| 1997 | Dalimix Gold | Salvador Dalí | | |
| 1998 | In Love Again | Yves Saint Laurent (fashion house) | Jean-Claude Ellena | |
| 1998 | V/S Versus | Versace | | |
| 1998 | Alchimie | Rochas | | |
| 1998 | Opium Fraîcheur d'Orient | Yves Saint Laurent (fashion house) | | |
| 1998 | Bulgari Black | Bulgari | Annick Ménardo | |
| 1998 | Romance | Ralph Lauren Corporation | | |
| 1999 | Hiris | Hermès | Olivia Giacobetti | |
| 1999 | Dzing! | L'Artisan Parfumeur | Olivia Giacobetti | |
| 1999 | J'adore | Parfums Christian Dior | Calice Becker | |
| 1999 | Baby Doll | Yves Saint Laurent (fashion house) | | |
| 2000 | Musc Ravageur | Editions de Parfums Frédéric Malle | Maurice Roucel | |
| 2000 | Flower by Kenzo | Kenzo | Alberto Morillas | |
| 2001 | Chergui | Serge Lutens | Christopher Sheldrake | |
| 2001 | Coco Mademoiselle | Chanel | Jacques Polge | |
| 2001 | Light Blue | Dolce & Gabbana | Olivier Cresp | |
| 2001 | Mugler Cologne | Thierry Mugler | Alberto Morillas | |
| 2001 | Nu | Yves Saint Laurent (fashion house) | Jacques Cavallier | |
| 2002 | Absolu | Rochas | | |
| 2002 | Aquawoman | Rochas | | |
| 2002 | Chance | Chanel | Jacques Polge | |
| 2002 | Fierce | Abercrombie & Fitch | Christophe Laudamiel and Carlos Benaim | |
| 2002 | M7 | Yves Saint Laurent (fashion house) | Alberto Morillas and Jacques Cavallier | |
| 2003 | 100% Love | S-Perfume | Sophia Grojsman | |
| 2003 | Beyond Paradise | Estée Lauder Companies | Calice Becker | |
| 2003 | Echo | Zino Davidoff Group | | |
| 2003 | Kenzo Air | Kenzo | Maurice Roucel | |
| 2003 | Life | Aramis | | |
| 2003 | Versace Man | Versace | Domitille Michalon | |
| 2003 | Omnia (fragrance) | Bulgari | Alberto Morillas | |
| 2003 | Narciso Rodriguez for Her | Narciso Rodriguez | Francis Kurkdjian and Christine Nagel | |
| 2004 | Ambre Narguile | Hermès | Jean-Claude Ellena | |
| 2004 | Apparition | Ungaro | | |
| 2004 | Armani Code | Armani | Antoine Lie | |
| 2004 | B Men | Thierry Mugler | | |
| 2004 | Crystal Noir | Versace | | |
| 2004 | Timbuktu | L'Artisan Parfumeur | Bertrand Duchaufour | |
| 2005 | Alien | Thierry Mugler | Dominique Ropion and Laurent Bruyère | |
| 2005 | Chinatown | Bond No. 9 | Aurélien Guichard | |
| 2005 | Miss Dior Chérie | Parfums Christian Dior | Christine Nagel | |
| 2005 | Un Jardin sur le Nil | Hermès | Jean-Claude Ellena | |
| 2005 | Flowerbomb | Viktor & Rolf | Olivier Polge, Carlos Benaim, and Domitille Bertier | |
| 2006 | Black Orchid | Tom Ford (brand) | David Apel and Pierre Negrin | |
| 2006 | Crystal Bright | Versace | Antoine Lie | |
| 2006 | Insolence | Guerlain | Maurice Roucel | |
| 2006 | L'Homme | Yves Saint Laurent (fashion house) | | |
| 2006 | Prada Tendre | Prada | Carlos Benaim and Clément Gavarry | |
| 2006 | Princess | Vera Wang | | |
| 2006 | Terre d'Hermès | Hermès | Jean-Claude Ellena | |
| 2007 | Light Blue Pour Homme | Dolce & Gabbana | Stefano Gabbana | |
| 2007 | Infusion d'Iris | Prada | Daniela Andrier | |
| 2007 | Black | Roberto Cavalli | | |
| 2007 | Noir de Noir Part of the Private Blend collection | Tom Ford (brand) | | |
| 2007 | Tuscan Leather | Tom Ford (brand) | | |
| 2007 | Ice Men | Thierry Mugler | | |
| 2007 | 28 La Pausa | Chanel | Jacques Polge | |
| 2007 | Daisy | Marc Jacobs | Alberto Morillas | |
| 2008 | Chloé Eau de Parfum | Chloé | Michel Almairac and Amandine Clerc-Marie | |
| 2008 | Féerie | Van Cleef & Arpels | | |
| 2008 | Diamonds for Men (fragrance) | Emporio Armani | Jacques Cavallier Belletrud | |
| 2008 | Adventure | Zino Davidoff Group | | |
| 2008 | The One (fragrance) | Dolce & Gabbana | | |
| 2008 | White Patchouli | Tom Ford (brand) | | |
| 2008 | 1 Million | Rabanne (fashion house) | | |
| 2009 | Versense | Versace | | |
| 2009 | Grey Vetiver | Tom Ford (brand) | | |
| 2009 | La Nuit De L'Homme | Yves Saint Laurent (fashion house) | | |
| 2010 | Bleu de Chanel | Chanel | Jacques Polge | |
| 2010 | Womanity | Thierry Mugler | | |
| 2010 | Portrait of a Lady | Frédéric Malle | Dominique Ropion | |
| 2011 | Santal 33 | Le Labo | Frank Voelkl | |
| 2012 | Cafe Rose - Private Blend | Tom Ford (brand) | | |
| 2012 | Jeunesse | Robert Piguet Parfums (Fashion Fragrances & Cosmetics Ltd) | Aurélien Guichard | |
| 2014 | Vince Camuto for Men | Vince Camuto | Steve Demercado | |
| 2014 | Costa Azzurra - Private Blend | Tom Ford (brand) | | |
| 2015 | Baccarat Rouge 540 | Francis Kurkdjian | Francis Kurkdjian | |
| 2015 | Magnificent Blossom | Yves Saint Laurent (fashion house) | | |
| 2015 | Sauvage | Parfums Christian Dior | François Demachy | |
| 2016 | Orchid Soleil | Tom Ford (brand) | | |
| 2017 | Fucking Fabulous - Private Blend | Tom Ford (brand) | | |
| 2018 | Fougere d'Argent - Private Blend | Tom Ford (brand) | | |
| 2018 | Lost Cherry - Private Blend | Tom Ford (brand) | | |
| 2018 | Ombre Leather | Tom Ford (brand) | | |
| 2019 | Metallique | Tom Ford (brand) | | |
| 2019 | Beau de Jour - Private Blend | Tom Ford (brand) | | |
| 2022 | Costa Azzurra Parfum | Tom Ford (brand) | | |

== See also ==
- Perfume
- List of celebrity-branded perfumes
