= Black Opium (perfume) =

Perfume by Yves Saint Laurent

Fragrance by Yves Saint Laurent
- Category: Oriental-Gourmand
- Designed for: Women
- Top notes: Pink pepper, Orange blossom, Pear
- Heart notes: Coffee, Jasmine
- Base notes: Vanilla, Patchouli, Cedarwood
- Released: 2014
- Perfumer(s): Nathalie Lorson, Marie Salamagne, Olivier Cresp, Honorine Blanc
- Concentration: eau de parfum
- Tagline: "The night is ours"
- Flanker(s): Flanker fragrances: Black Opium Neon; Black Opium Illicit Green; Black Opium Extreme; Black Opium Le Parfum; Black Opium Over Red; Black Opium Glitter
- Predecessor: Belle d' Opium
- Successor: Libre
- Website: Official Webpage

Black Opium is an Oriental-Gourmand perfume for women, created for the French fashion house Yves Saint Laurent by perfumers Nathalie Lorson, Marie Salamagne, Olivier Cresp and Honorine Blanc. Black Opium is one of the most popular perfumes from Yves Saint Laurent.

The top notes are a mix of fruits, flowers and spices, the heart note has accords of coffee and jasmine, the former been the special note of the perfume and the base note is a combination of vanilla, patchouli and cedarwood. The perfume is a successor of Opium.

== Design and theme ==
The perfume has the same bottle as Opium, but it is black with glitter, meant to reflect a black diamond. The bottle is meant to present the idea of nighttime and seduction, evidenced by its tagline "The night is ours".

== Advertising ==
The advertising campaigns focus on its ambassador, American actress Zoe Kravitz and has as main setting the night, the theme of the perfume. The 2020 commercial focuses on Kravitz using the perfume while the soundtrack is the song of The Weeknd, The Hills. The 2023 commercial, directed by Anton Tammi, follows Kravitz and her friends enjoying of a party in a nightclub, while the soundtrack is the song Moth to a Flame by Swedish House Mafia and The Weeknd.

== See also ==
- Believe (fragrance)
