= Poison (perfume) =

Perfume by Christian Dior

Fragrance by Christian Dior
- Notes: A spicy floral elixir
- Top notes: Coriander, orange blossom, plum, black pepper, star anise
- Heart notes: Tuberose Absolute, rose de mai, carnation, jasmine, labdanum, berries, cinnamon, honey
- Base notes: Vanilla, Amber, Sandalwood, Cedarwood, Vetiver, Heliotrope, Opopanax, Musk
- Released: July 4, 1985
- Label: Parfums Christian Dior
- Tagline: Poison is my potion
- Flanker(s): Tendre Poison; Hypnotic Poison; Pure Poison; Midnight Poison; Poison Girl
- Predecessor: Dior Dior
- Successor: Dune

Poison is a perfume for women introduced by Parfums Christian Dior in 1985. The popularity of the scent made it become a brand in its own right and resulted in the subsequent release of five flanker fragrances: Tendre Poison, Hypnotic Poison, Pure Poison, Midnight Poison, and Poison Girl.

== Concept ==
By 1980, Dior was enjoying robust product sales in Europe. At the time, the company was one of the top two cosmetics companies in the region. However, they were not able to achieve the same level of success in the American cosmetics market, as they were ranked as the twentieth best selling cosmetics company in United States.

In order to close the gap between Dior's sales on both sides of the Atlantic, the company's president Maurice Roger commissioned a blockbuster fragrance that would dominate the American market. Dior invested heavily in meticulous research and development.

Dior developed a savvy marketing strategy based on the controversial name of Yves Saint Laurent's top-selling fragrance, Opium. The company wanted a name for the new fragrance that would generate massive publicity and, in turn, sales. In 1983, Dior licensed the name Poison.

== The scent ==
After testing approximately 800 scents created by independent perfumers, Dior selected a bombastic fragrance created by perfumier Edouard Flechier. It was a scent unlike any other with notes of wild berries, sandalwood, musk, jasmine, orange blossom, coriander, vetiver, pepper, cedar, cinnamon, rosewood, plum, heliotrope, tuberose, vanilla, rose de mai absolute, cistus labdanum and opopanax.

== Bottle design ==
The bottle was researched in depth. A unique bottle was crafted for Poison and designed to look like forbidden fruit. The color of the apple shaped bottle is a deep shade of amethyst, and the neck is gold with a crystal stopper.

== Marketing ==
On its 1985 release, the brand ambassador for the fragrance was French actor Isabelle Adjani. She remained the face of the advertising campaign for several years.

== Awards ==
Poison won a FiFi Award in 1987.

== Variants of Poison ==
=== Tendre Poison ===
In 1994, Flechier created a follow-up fragrance called Tendre Poison which he designed for a more youthful demographic. The spokesmodels were Paul Sculfor and Laurence Vanhaeverbeke.

=== Hypnotic Poison ===
Hypnotic Poison was created launched in 1998. Created by perfumer Annick Menardo the fragrance is an oriental vanilla scent. The top notes are plum, apricot and coconut with tuberose, jasmine, rose, caraway and lily of the valley middle notes. The base notes are musk, vanilla, sandalwood and almond.

Spokesmodels for the fragrance include actors Monica Bellucci and Milla Jovovich. Most recently French actor Mélanie Laurent appeared in a commercial directed by David Lynch.

=== Pure Poison ===
Pure Poison was created by Carlos Benaim, Dominique Ropion and Olivier Polge in 2004. The fragrance is bergamot, jasmine, sandalwood, orange blossom, white musk and amber.

In 2006, Dior released Pure Poison Elixir, an updated version of the fragrance, in a spray bulb mother of pearl bottle. The scent became more nuanced with the addition of cocoa bean absolute.

The spokesmodel was Letícia Birkheuer.

=== Midnight Poison ===
In 2007, with John Galliano at the helm of the House of Dior, a fifth fragrance was added to the series. Midnight Poison was contained in a sapphire blue bottle. The scent was created by Jacques Cavallier, Olivier Cresp and François Demanchy.

The top note are orange blossom and bergamot. The middle notes are rose. The base notes are patchouli, amber and vanilla.

The spokesmodel for the fragrance is actor Eva Green.

=== Poison Girl ===
In 2016, Dior released another variant of the original Poison perfume called Poison Girl. Created by perfumer François Demachy, the fragrance comes in a clear, pink bottle. It has a top note of bitter orange, a Grasse and Damascus Rose heart note, and a base note of Venezuelan tonka bean. The scent also has sandalwood, tolu balm, almond, and vanilla.

The spokesmodel for the fragrance is Camille Rowe.
