= Polo (fragrance) =

Perfume by Ralph Lauren Corporation

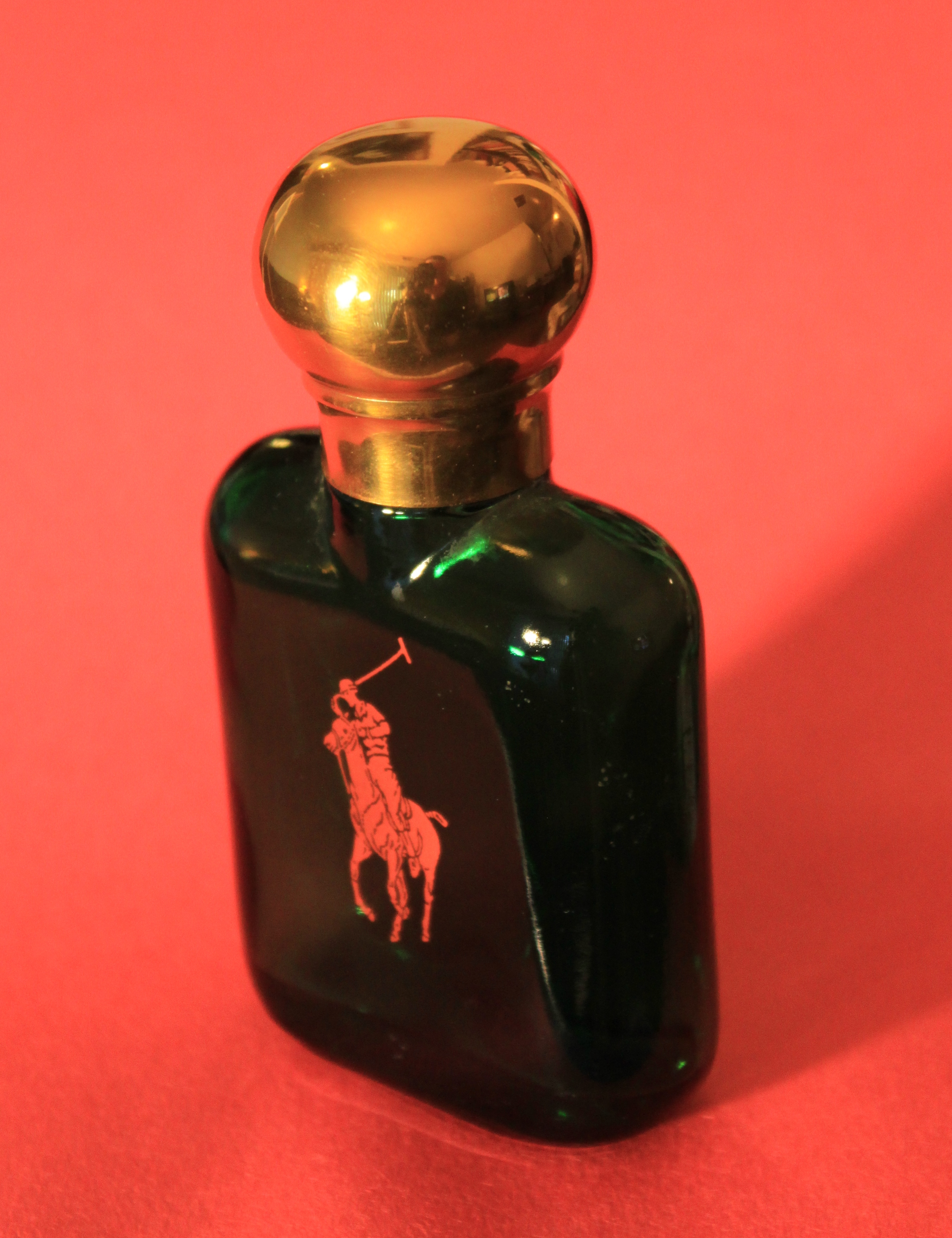

Fragrance by Ralph Lauren
- Category: Woody chypre
- Designed for: Men
- Top notes: Canadian pine, juniper
- Heart notes: Artemisia
- Base notes: Leather, patchouli
- Released: 1978
- Label: Ralph Lauren Corporation
- Perfumer(s): Carlos Benaïm
- Awards: FiFi Award (1979)
- Website: www.ralphlauren.com/men-accessories-fragrance

Polo is one of the two first perfumes by Ralph Lauren Corporation. It was created by Carlos Benaïm in 1978, and won a FiFi Award in 1979. Polo is a masculine perfume, and does not contain floral notes apart from chamomile. The opening is green and fresh, including grassy notes of artemisia, basil and thyme, with spicy notes of cumin, coriander and cloves. The heart contains conifer woods, patchouli, oakmoss and vetiver. The base contains leather, tobacco and thyme. Polo is a woody chypre, like Aromatics Elixir by Clinique (1971).

Carlos Benaïm was named Master Perfumer in 2013, the first perfumer so designated at International Flavors & Fragrances. He has also created fragrances for Armani, Calvin Klein, Givenchy, and Yves Saint Laurent.

== See also ==
- List of perfumes
