= Kouros (perfume) =

Men's fragrance by Yves Saint Laurent

Fragrance by Yves Saint Laurent
- Notes: Clove, Oakmoss, Incense
- Released: 1981
- Label: Yves Saint Laurent
- Tagline: Kouros, un parfum pour dieux vivants
- Flanker(s): Body Kouros, Kouros Fraicheur

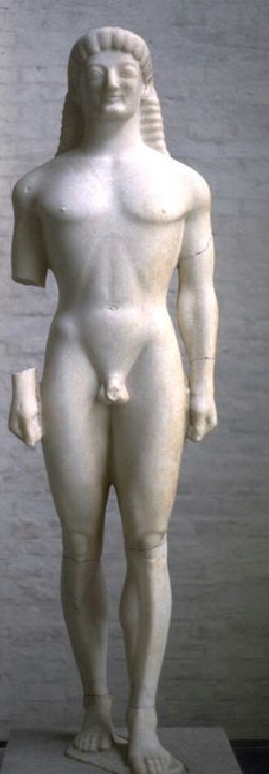
Example of a kouros statue: the Kouros of Tenea, c. 550 BC

Kouros is a perfume for men produced by Yves Saint Laurent. The perfume was introduced in 1981. It was created by perfumer Pierre Bourdon. It is also known as "The Scent of the Gods."

The perfume was inspired by a trip to Greece Saint Laurent had taken. He was particularly impressed by the kouroi:

J'avais été fasciné par le bleu de la mer, le ciel, la fraîcheur intense qui émanait de cet univers voué à la beauté. Dans le même temps, j'ai revu les statues de ces jeunes hommes qui sont la splendeur de la statuaire grecque. ... J'avais mon nouveau parfum. Et son nom. (I had been fascinated by the blue of the sea, the sky, the intense freshness which emanated from this universe dedicated to beauty. At the same time, I saw the statues of these young men who are the splendor of Greek statuary. ... I had my new perfume. And its name.)

== Perfume notes ==
- Top notes: Aldehydes, Bergamot, Tarragon, Clary Sage, Coriander
- Heart notes: Carnation, Vetiver, Patchouli, Cinnamon, Jasmine, Orris Root, Geranium
- Base notes: Oakmoss, Amber, Incense, Honey, Leather, Civet, Musk, Tonka Bean, Vanilla

== Flankers and reformulations ==
A spin-off fragrance Body Kouros was released in 2000, and Kouros Fraicheur by Yves Saint Laurent, a woody chypre fragrance was launched in 1993.

The scent has undergone many reformulations throughout the years and the modern version has been largely criticised in fragrance reviews.
