= Maurice Roucel =

French perfumer

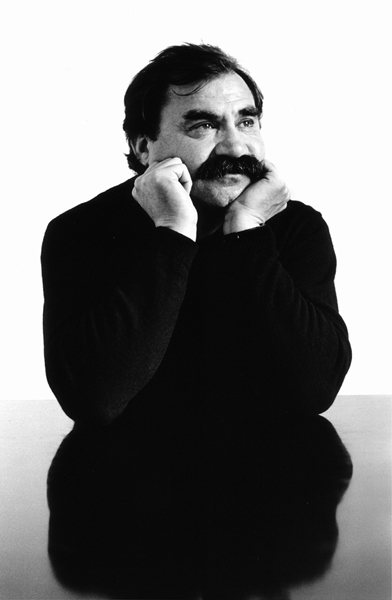
Maurice Roucel

Maurice Roucel is a French perfumer who has worked at International Flavors & Fragrances Inc., Quest, Dragoco, and presently Symrise. Roucel began his career in perfumery on February 19, 1973, while working as the head chromatography chemist at Chanel for 6 years. He commenced his apprenticeship under Henri Robert, Chanel's house perfumer at the time. He joined Quest International and for 12 years developed his craft as a perfumer before switching to work for Symrise in 1996. Most of the fragrances composed by Roucel have his signature scent of Michelia longifolia.

He was also the winner of various accolades in the fragrance industry including the Prix François Coty in 2002, and the French and American FiFi as well as the French "Oscar des Parfums" Awards.

== List of creations ==
Below are some of the perfumes Roucel created.

Year	House	Fragrance
1997	Gucci	Envy
1995	Hermès	24 Faubourg
1994	Serge Lutens	Iris Silver Mist
1981	Krizia	K de Krizia
1994	Rochas	Tocade
2004	Guerlain	L'Instant de Guerlain
2005	Guerlain	Insolence
2007	Guerlain	L'Instant Fleur de Mandarine
2000	Helmut Lang	Eau de Parfum
2007	Lancôme	Hypnose Homme
2006	Le Labo	Jasmine 17
2006	Le Labo	Labdanum 18
2006	Reminiscence	Jammin
2002	Roberto Cavalli	Roberto Cavalli
2004	Roberto Cavalli	Oro
1995	Revillon	R
1996	Fabergé	Irium Pour Homme
1992	Hunca	Asimetri
1990	Tristano Onofri	Eros Homme
2000	Editions de Parfums Frédéric Malle	Musc Ravageur
2006	Nautica	Voyage
2007	Kiton	Kiton Black
2004	DKNY	Be Delicious
1981	Missoni	Missoni
2007	Missoni	Missoni Acqua
2008	Celine Dion	Sensational
2006	Lolita Lempicka	L de Lolita Lempicka
2008	Lolita Lempicka	Fleur de Corail
2001	Castelbajac	Castelbajac
2005	Dunhill	Fresh
2001	Dunhill	Desire for a Woman
2003	Ellen Tracy	Imagine
1982	Yves Rocher	Ispahan
1999	Rochas	Rochas Man
1994	Parfums Monsoon	Monsoon
2005	Estee Lauder	Pleasures Intense for Men
2003	Kenzo	Air
1997	Lalique	Lalique pour Homme
2004	Shalini	Shalini
2021	Shalini	Fleur Japonais
2024	Shalini	GOLD
2006	Guess	Guess for Women
2004	Gianfranco Ferre	GF Ferre Lei-Her
2004	Jacques Bogart	Bogart pour Homme
2004	Pardis	Jaguar Woman
1998	Gai Mattiolo	Gai Mattiolo Man
2003	Ted Lapidus	TL pour Lui (with Norbert Bijaoui)
2001	Strenesse	Strenesse
2003	Bond No. 9	Broadway Nite
2003	Bond No. 9	New Haarlem
2003	Bond No. 9	Riverside Drive
1993	Alain Delon	Lyra
unknown	Parera	Cobalt
2006	Marc Jacobs	Splash Orange (with Patricia Choux)
1994	Adidas	Sport for Men
2008	Adidas	Vitality for Women
1994	Shiseido	We're
1996	Shiseido	We're for Men
2001	Max Azria	BCBGirls Star
1997	Ulric de Varens	Eau de Varens No. 2
1989	Kanebo	HF
1991	Mondi	Pursence
2008	Laura Mercier	Neroli
2013	David Beckham	Urban Homme
2004	Carolina Herrera	So Chic
2013	Laurence Dumont	I'm Free Cherry Cherie
1979	Ellen Betrix	Henry M. Betrix Country
2008	Editions de Parfums Frédéric Malle	Dans tes Bras
2016	Avon	Luminata
2018	Shalini	Amorem Rose
2017	Shalini	Jardin Nocturne
2019	Shalini	Paradis Provence
2020	What We Do Is Secret	A Blvd. Called Sunset
2022	Editions de Parfums Frédéric Malle	Uncut Gem
