= Antaeus (perfume) =

Perfume

Fragrance by Chanel
- Top notes: Clary sage, coriander, bergamot
- Heart notes: Rose, thyme, basil
- Base notes: Castoreum, leather, cistus, patchouli
- Released: 1981
- Tagline: The expression of strength and magnetism

Antaeus is a men's perfume produced by French fashion house Chanel. Introduced in 1981, it was created by perfumer Jacques Polge. It is classified as a leather chypre and was Chanel's second fragrance for men after Chanel Pour Monsieur, which was introduced in 1955. The fragrance was named after the mythic giant Antaeus.
