= Ysatis (perfume) =

Givenchy perfume

Ysatis is a women's perfume produced by French fashion house Givenchy introduced in 1984. Xeryus, a matching fragrance for men, was introduced in 1986.
