= Lancôme =

French perfume and cosmetics brand

- Type: Subsidiary
- Industry: Cosmetics
- Founded: 1935; 91 years ago
- Founders: Guillaume d'Ornano; Armand Petitjean
- Headquarters: Paris, France
- Products: Perfumes and cosmetics
- Parent: L'Oréal (1964–present)
- Website: lancome.com

Lancôme (French pronunciation: [lɑ̃kom]) is a French perfume and cosmetics company that distributes products internationally. A subsidiary of L'Oréal, Lancôme offers skin care, fragrances, and makeup.

== History ==
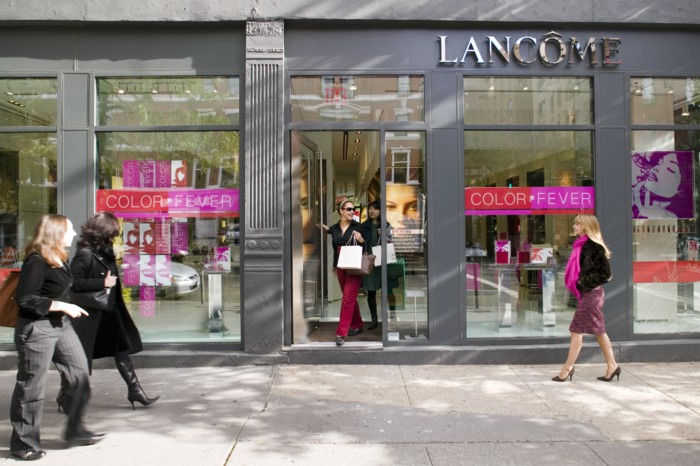
Lancôme Boutique on NYC's Upper West Side

In 1935, Armand Petitjean founded Lancôme in France as a fragrance house. Guillaume d'Ornano and d'Ornano's brother joined him to manage sales and marketing; Pierre Vélon was the chemist; and Edouard Breckenridge was the legal advisor. d'Ornano's wife Elisabeth d'Ornano chose the company name "Lancôme", which was inspired by the Château de Lancosme in the region of Brenne, which lies in the Indre valley in the heart of France. The roses in the area inspired the company's symbol of the single golden rose.

Lancôme launched its first five fragrances in 1935 at the World's Fair in Brussels: Tendre Nuit, Bocages, Conquete, Kypre and Tropiques. Petitjean entered into the skincare market, launching Nutrix, his first "all-purpose repair cream" in 1936, followed by make-up, cosmetics, and skincare products. Lancôme was acquired by L'Oréal in 1964, and became part of its luxury products division.

== Products ==
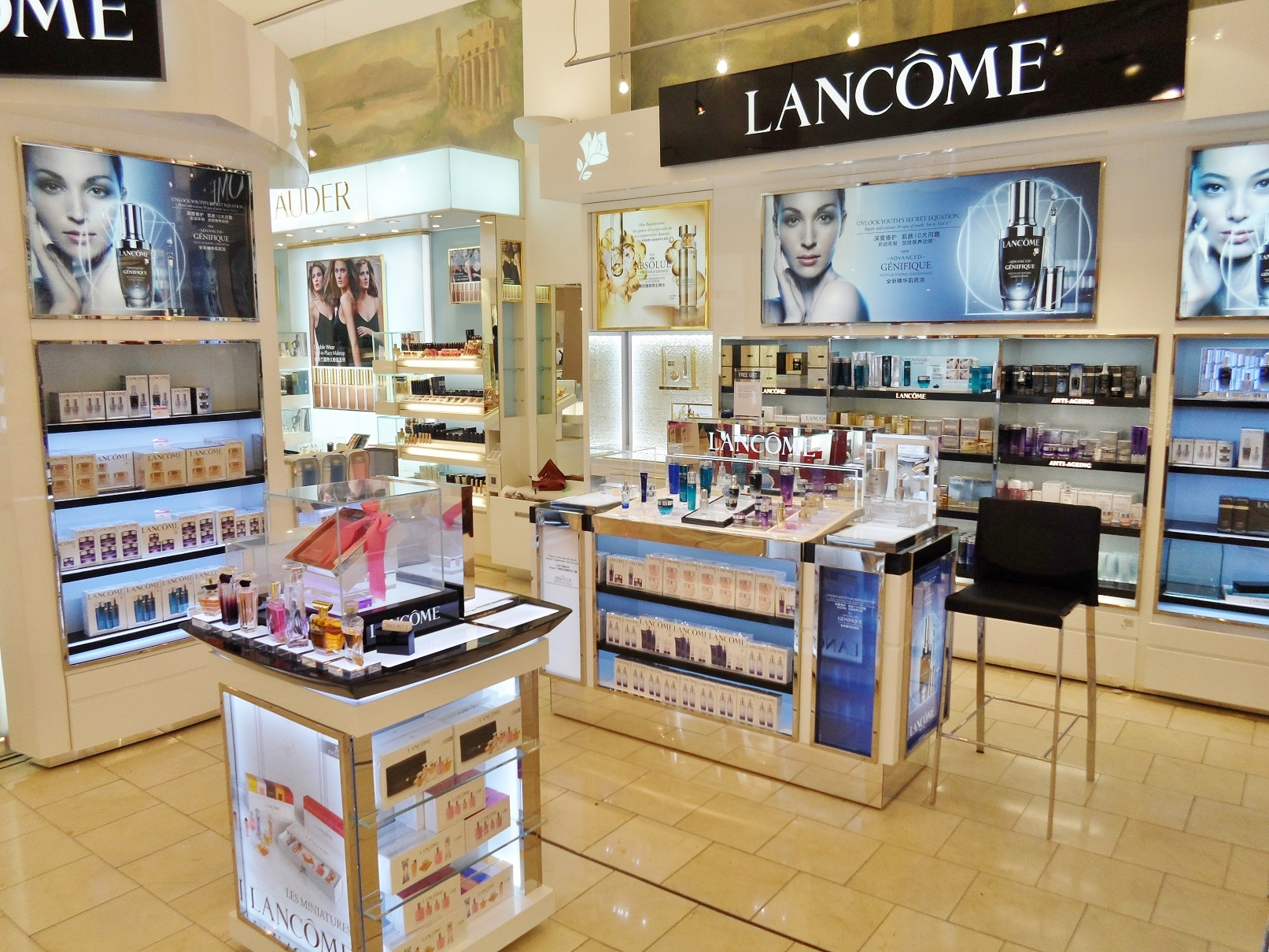
Lancôme counter at DFS Galleria Customhouse in Auckland, New Zealand

The company produces fragrances, skin care, and makeup.

Lancôme fragrances are made in association with perfumers: Alain Astori, Annick Menardo, Daniela Roche-Andrier, Christian Biecher, Jacques Cavallier, Calice Becker, Pauline Zanoni, Maurice Roucel, Thierry Wasser, Christine Nagel, Armand Petitjean, Gerard Goupy, Olivier Cresp, Harry Fremont, Alberto Morillas, Dominique Ropion, Olivier Polge, Francis Kurkdjian, Robert Gonnon, Nathalie Lorson, Sophia Grojsman, and Alienor Massenet.

== Advertising ==
Despite founder Armand Petijean's assertion that Lancôme never advertise, today Lancôme is one of the top advertisers in the beauty arena. Its ads can be seen in numerous publications worldwide. Lancôme's ads have been shot by leading photographers, including Peter Lindbergh, Mario Testino, Mario Sorrenti, Nick Knight, Steven Meisel, Brigitte Lacombe, Patrick Demarchelier, and Dusan Reljin.

Fashion designers that have collaborated with the brand, include design duo Proenza Schouler, and Alber Elbaz

One of Lancôme's longest-running partnerships was with actress Isabella Rossellini. Rossellini was the international face of Lancôme for 14 years. In 2016, Rossellini returned for a collaboration, more than 30 years after she became its first face.

In 2006, Clive Owen became the first male spokesperson for Lancôme. He joined to represent the brand's new Men's skincare range and the fragrance Hypnôse Homme.

== Digital marketing in Lancôme ==
=== Social media marketing ===
In 2014, Lancôme launched a marketing campaign via social media platforms. This program gives points as the reward to members for sharing on social media.

== Makeup artists ==
Lancôme has had several makeup artists representing it.

== Controversy ==
=== Hong Kong ===
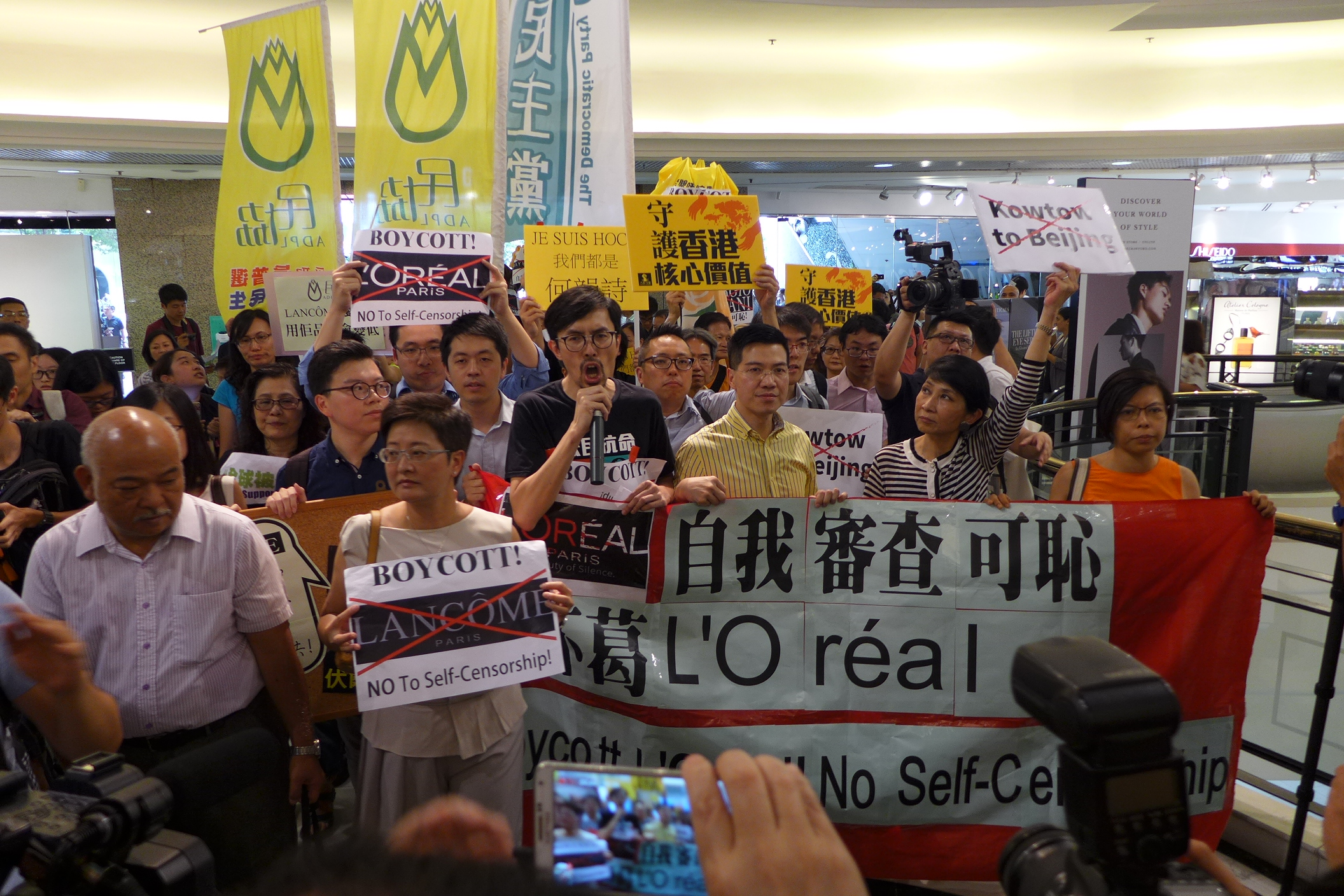
Protesters gathered Times Square mall on 8/6 afternoon

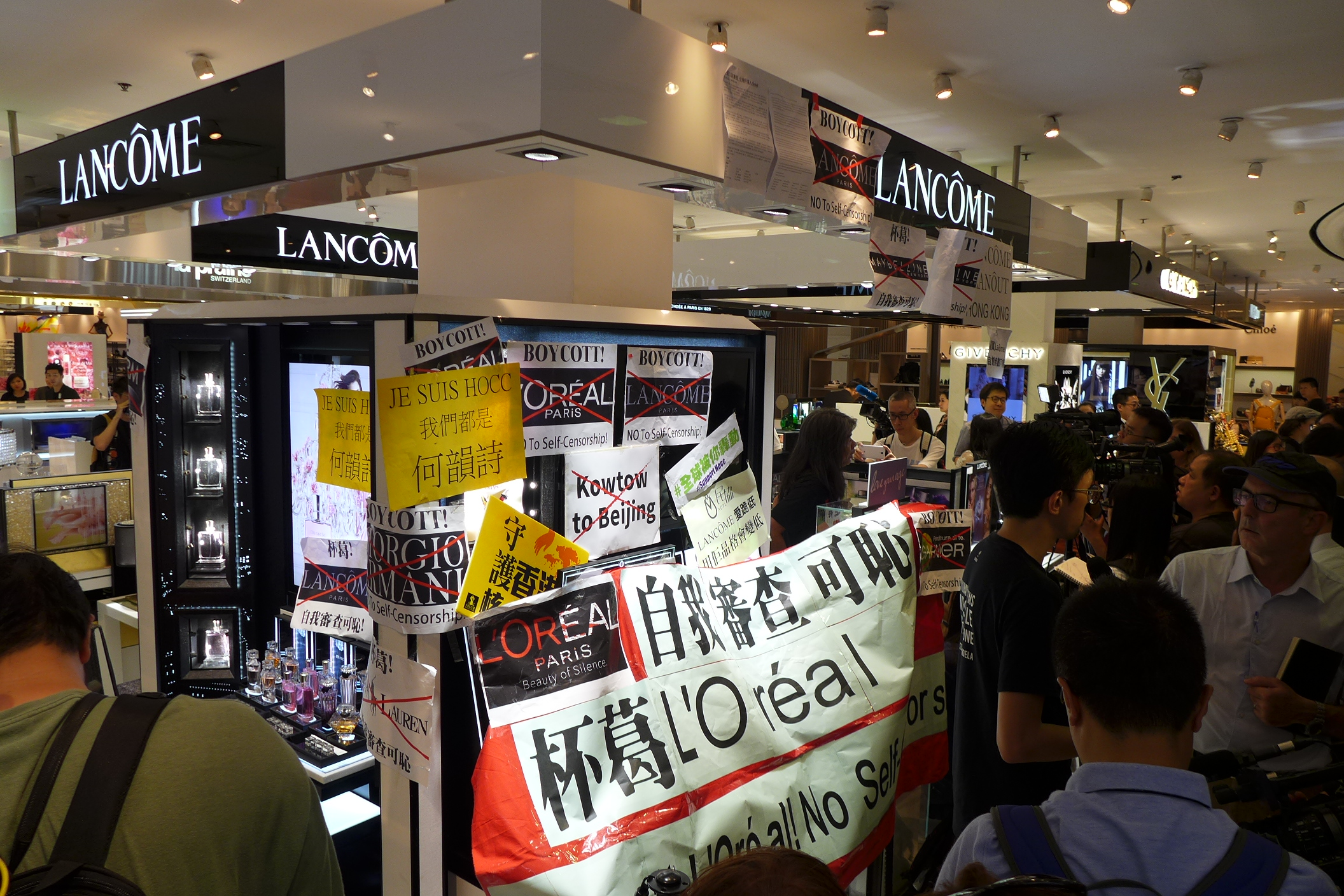
Lancome counters in Lane Crawford after the protest

On 5 June 2016, Lancôme canceled a promotional concert by Hong Kong pro-democracy singer Denise Ho that was scheduled to be held on 19 June in Sheung Wan. The cancellation was due to a boycott campaign launched by the Communist Party-controlled Global Times, which denigrated the Cantopop star for supposedly advocating Hong Kong and Tibet independence. Lancôme posted on Facebook that Ho is not a spokesperson for the brand. The cancellation drew a heavy backlash in Hong Kong, resulting in some Lancôme shops in Hong Kong shutting down during the protests. Some Hong Kong merchants refused to accept the political pressure from the Chinese government. Listerine, another brand that Ho represents, retained the singer despite criticism from the Global Times for hiring Ho as its spokesperson.

Ho ended up playing the concert without Lancôme's support.
