= White Shoulders (fragrance) =

1943 perfume by Evyan Perfumes

Fragrance by Evyan Perfumes
- Category: White Floral
- Designed for: Women
- Top notes: Primarily aldehydes
- Heart notes: Primarily orange blossom and tuberose
- Base notes: Amber, benzoin, civet, musk, oakmoss, and sandalwood
- Released: 1943
- Label: Evyan Perfumes
- Perfumer(s): Walter Langer
- Tagline: "The Best the World Has to Offer"

White Shoulders is a white floral fragrance released in 1943 by spouses Walter ("Peter") Langer and Diane Evelyn ("Evyan") Langer, who incorporated Evyan Perfumes, Inc., in 1946.

Evyan had Titian hair and fair skin. As they told it, at a dinner party the Duke of Marlborough complimented Evyan on her white shoulders, thus inspiring the perfume's name.

== The Langers ==
Walter and Evyan wanted to create an American fragrance that would rival French ones; import restrictions during World War II made this a financially shrewd move. Their image of wealth and stately sophistication, and the gothic romance of their relationship, was an important part of the marketing for their fragrance lines.

Walter and Evyan gave different information about themselves at different times. Both were born sometime in the early 1900s. Walter, born Aaron Walter Langer, was born to a family of railway workers in Ostrava and was a competitive figure skater when he traveled to New York in 1926 for skating exhibitions. He traveled between the two countries and ultimately competed in the 1932 Winter Olympics, until he and Evyan began their perfume business. Possibly, he stopped using his first name to conceal Jewish heritage. He reportedly became a "bought baron," a reference to the practice of using a purchased or symbolic barony title. He presented himself as Dr. Walter Langer, the Baron Langer von Langendorff of Vienna, Austria, with either a degree in chemistry or three Doctors degrees and a background as a chief chemist for a flavoring and fragrances company.

They said they met in the 1920s at a polo match in Long Island, but they may have first arrived in the United States in 1937 for their honeymoon and stayed.

Evyan was born in Devonshire, England. She presented herself as a descendent of Sir Francis Drake and a goddaughter of George Bernard Shaw and James Barrie, the great-granddaughter of a lady-in-waiting for Queen Victoria, a woman whose family owned a 250,000-acre (101,171 hectares) English estate (which is about the combined size of the Royal Family's Duchy of Lancaster, Duchy of Cornwall, Sandringham House, and Balmoral Castle). Her father was a diplomat, she said, and the Indian government gave him a 1,000 carat aquamarine gem that previously belonged to Shah Jahan and was looted by Nader Shah, and used by the Raja of Afghanistan to buy asylum in Lahore in 1813. This origin story shared some elements with the history of the Koh-i-Noor diamond, in which Nader Shah looted Delhi including the diamond in 1739, and in 1813 Shah Shuja Durrani sought refuge in Lahore reportedly with the diamond. Or, sometimes she said the aquamarine came from her ancestor, Sir Francis Drake.

Evyan was born Eveline Marguerite Westall Mason, and before Walter she married a U.S. Vice Consul from Missouri named Clarence Austin Castle in London, in 1924. She sometimes went by the name Lady Clinton Westall and sometimes it was written Lady Diana Westall Clinton; upon her marriage to Walter, she used the name and title Baroness Diana Langer von Langendorff.

== Fragrance ==
Walter Langer created this white floral perfume. It has a strong tuberose note, built from an overdose of Aurantiol (with a scent of orange blossom and neroli) combined with aldehyde C-18 (a "coconut" aldehyde), which was an approach inspired by Parfums Forvil Cinq Fleurs (1926). Langer added a 20 percent level of the synthetic musk ethylene brassylate, which has a powdery, spicy, vanilla amber scent.

The fragrance has sparkling floral top notes; white floral middle notes; and powdery base notes:

Top notes
Primarily aldehydes; also bergamot, green notes, lily of the valley, neroli, and peach
Middle notes
Primarily orange blossom and tuberose; also clove bud, gardenia, iris, jasmine, lilac, rose, and ylang-ylang
Base notes
Amber, benzoin, civet, musk, oakmoss, and sandalwood

The use of ethylene brassylate to enhance the floral notes influenced perfumer John Doyle to do the same when making Jessica McClintock Jessica McClintock (1988).

== Ownership timeline ==
- The Langers:
  - 1943–1946: During this time, Walter Langer created White Shoulders, Menace (1943), and Gay Diversion (1946). He and his wife Evelyn partnered with Nanty, Inc. for the right to use the Hartnell name. Norman Hartnell was a fashion designer who famously made dresses for Queen Elizabeth the Queen Mother. During this time, Evelyn Langer owned the trademarks, and the Langers marketed their fragrances under the Hartnell label.
  - 1946–1988: After a legal dispute, the Langers incorporated Evyan Perfumes, which became the owner and marketer of White Shoulders. In 1968, Evelyn Langer died. In 1983, Walter Langer died. Gabriele Langendorff, a younger woman he married after Evelyn's death, and Leona Robinson, Evyan's executive vice president who Langer treated as a daughter, fought in court for years over the company and estate.
- Chesebrough-Ponds (Unilever), Elizabeth Arden:
  - 1989: Chesebrough-Pond's, a division of Unilever, bought Evyan Perfumes for $75 million.
  - 1989/1990: Unilever acquired Elizabeth Arden, Inc.. White Shoulders was folded into the Elizabeth Arden division.
  - 1993: Evyan Perfumes, Inc., was dissolved.
- FFI, Elizabeth Arden:
  - 2000/2001: FFI Fragrances bought Unilever's Elizabeth Arden division, which included White Shoulders. FFI changed its name to Elizabeth Arden, Inc.
- Revlon:
  - 2016: Revlon bought Elizabeth Arden, Inc. (formerly FFI), which included White Shoulders, for $870 million.
  - 2020: As part of Revlon's debt refinancing, Revlon moved the trademark to a shell company named BrandCo White Shoulders 2020 LLC. In 2022, Revlon, Inc. and their affiliated entities including BrandCo White Shoulders 2020 LLC filed for Chapter 11 bankruptcy. Revlon emerged from bankruptcy as a privately held company renamed Revlon Group Holdings.
