= Ffern =

British fragrance company

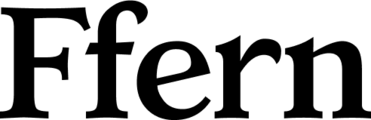
- Company type: Private
- Industry: Perfumery
- Founded: 2017
- Founders: Owen Mears; Emily Cameron
- Headquarters: Somerset, United Kingdom
- Area served: Worldwide
- Products: Seasonal, small-batch natural perfumes
- Website: ffern.co

Ffern is a British fragrance company based in Somerset, England. It produces seasonal, small-batch perfumes using natural ingredients, distributed through a membership model known as the ledger.

== History ==
Ffern was founded in 2017 by siblings Owen Mears and Emily Cameron. Raised next door to an organic herb farm in Somerset, Mears and Cameron developed an early interest in botanical scents. While at Oxford, Mears began growing plants in his dormitory to recreate the scents of his childhood home in rural Somerset, drawing on the work of 19th-century chemist Joseph Robert. This led them to work with perfumers François Robert, Joseph’s great-grandson, and Elodie Durande. Ffern released its first fragrance on the winter solstice of 2018.

In 2022, Ffern opened its sole physical retail location in Soho, London.

== Operations ==
Ffern operates on a direct-to-consumer model, releasing four limited-edition, natural fragrances annually to coincide with the seasonal equinoxes and solstices. Production is limited to a closed ledger of members; a system managed through a waitlist.

Ffern operates a blending facility in Brighton and a bottling plant in Somerset.

== Ffern Folk Foundation ==
To support the preservation of local customs, Ffern launched the Ffern Folk Foundation, which offers yearly endowments to artisans and performers. The foundation's inaugural grant recipient was Boss Morris, an all-female Morris dancing troupe from Gloucestershire.
