= Christopher Sheldrake =

French perfumer

- Born: 11 April 1955 (age 71); Madras, India
- Occupation: Perfumer
- Employer: Chanel (1 December 2005 - February 2025)

Christopher Sheldrake is a perfumer who has created perfumes for Chanel, Shiseido, Serge Lutens, Rochas, Avon and SpaceNK. Some of his most notable fragrances include Chanel's Coco Noir and Serge Lutens, Chergui.
