= Armani Code =

2004 fragrance by Armani

Fragrance by Armani
- Category: Spicy Amber
- Designed for: Men
- Top notes: Lemon, bergamot
- Heart notes: Star anise, olive blossom, guaiac wood
- Base notes: Leather, tonka bean, tobacco
- Released: 2004
- Label: Armani
- Perfumer(s): Antoine Lie
- Flanker(s): Armani Code Colonia; Armani Code Profumo; Armani Code Absolu
- Awards: FiFi Award, Fragrance of the Year – Men's Luxe (2006)

Armani Code is a men's fragrance released by the Italian fashion house Armani in 2004. It won Fragrance of the Year – Men's Luxe at the FiFi Awards in 2006, and as of 2019 was reported to be among the ten best-selling men's fragrances worldwide. The line has since been extended with several flankers, and its campaigns have been fronted by Chris Pine, Ryan Reynolds and Regé-Jean Page.

== Awards ==
Armani Code won Fragrance of the Year – Men's Luxe at the 34th annual FiFi Awards, held in New York in April 2006. Giorgio Armani Parfums took several other prizes at the same ceremony, among them Men's Nouveau Niche and the best packaging awards in both the women's and men's prestige categories, all for Armani Privé.

== Flankers ==
=== Armani Code Profumo ===
Armani Code Profumo was added to the range in 2016. The Hollywood Reporter described it as inspired by the Giorgio Armani tuxedo, and reported its composition as amber, tonka bean and burnt styrax wood with green mandarin essence and green apple. Bottles carried Chris Pine's name embroidered on the label.

=== Armani Code Absolu ===
Armani Code Absolu followed in 2019, composed by the perfumer Antoine Maisondieu as what the house described as an "amplified and warmed" interpretation of the original. It was released in travel retail from April 2019 in Europe, the Middle East, Africa and India, reaching Asia and the Americas the following month. The bottle has a black grained finish with a belt detail referencing a tuxedo cummerbund. At the time of the launch the range also comprised Armani Code, Armani Code Colonia and Armani Code Profumo.

== Campaigns ==
Chris Pine starred in the campaign for Armani Code Profumo, which was trailed by a teaser in February 2016 and ran that month across television, social media and online; the online version allowed viewers to move between moments of the filmed party or walk alongside Pine.

In 2019 Ryan Reynolds became the face of the Code line, fronting the Absolu campaign. The campaign film was directed by Reed Morano and photographed by Matthew Brookes. Regé-Jean Page later became the face of Armani Code.
