= Jacques Cavallier =

French perfumer

Jacques Cavallier-Belletrud
- Born: 24 January 1962 (age 64); Grasse, France
- Occupation: Perfumer
- Employer: LVMH

Jacques Cavallier-Belletrud (born 24 January 1962) is a French perfumer, formerly with the Swiss fragrance and flavor company Firmenich, who currently works for Louis Vuitton of the LVMH Luxury Group.

He has created or collaborated in the creation of over 80 fragrances and perfumes for fashion house brands such as Parfums Christian Dior, Parfums Givenchy, Issey Miyake, Yves Saint Laurent, Fenty Beauty and Lancôme.

== Biography ==
Cavallier was born in Grasse, "the capital of perfume", a town known for centuries for its manufacture of perfumes, to a family that lived in the town since the 15th century. His father and grandfather were also perfumers, whom he credits as having been his greatest influences. As a child, his father trained him in the fragrances of natural raw components, and he has stated that the ingredients he considers most essential for perfumers to use include rose, agar wood, jasmine and orange blossom. He began working at the age of 10 in perfume factories in Grasse during the summers. He later studied English and Spanish at the University of Nice.

== Career ==
He first joined the perfumery company Charabot, and after three years went to the fine fragrance lab at Quest International in Naarden, Netherlands. In 1988 he joined the firm of PFW Aroma Chemicals B.V., and then moved to the fragrance and flavor conglomerate Firmenich in 1990. At Firmenich, he collaborated with Alberto Morillas to create:

- Calvin Klein's Truth
- Carolina Herrera's Chic
- Ermenegildo Zegna's Essenza di Zegna
- Givenchy's Hot Couture
- Oscar de la Renta's Intrusion
- Van Cleef & Arpels' Murmure
- Van Cleef & Arpels' Zanzibar for Men
- Yves Saint Laurent's M7

He collaborated with Olivier Cresp to create:

- Cacharel's Amor Pour Homme Tentation
- Christian Dior's Midnight Poison
- Diesel's Fuel for Life Unlimited
- Lancôme's Magnifique
- Nina Ricci's Nina
- Paco Rabanne's Pour Elle
- Yves Rocher's So Elixir
- YSL's Elle

He also collaborated with Chantal Roos to create:

- Issey Miyake L'Eau d'Issey (1991)
- Jean Paul Gaultier's Women (1993)
- Issey Miyake's L'Eau d'Issey for Men
- Issey Miyake's Le Feu

While Tom Ford was Creative Director at YSL, Cavallier created for him:

- Cinema
- M7
- Nu
- Rive Gauche Pour Homme
- Tuscan Leather (with Harry Fremont, under Ford's own label)
- Noir de Noir (with Harry Fremont, under Ford's own label)

He also created Calvin Klein's Man (with Harry Fremont).

Despite Cavallier’s extensive knowledge of natural components of fragrances, his biggest successes came from the inclusion in several of his most successful perfumes of a synthetic molecule, methylbenzodioxepinone (8-methyl-1,5-benzodioxepin-3-one), known in the industry as Calone 1951 and colloquially as "watermelon ketone". Calone imparts a light, airy, sea-breeze scent with an aqueous watermelon/melon feel that was used by Cavallier in Aqua di Gio and L'Eau d'Issey in the 1990s and Bulgari's Aqva Pour Homme Marine in 2008. Calone 1951 provides the main "marine" scent in perfumes, and Cavallier was among the first perfumers to incorporate this scent into the “water” or “marine” category of fragrances.

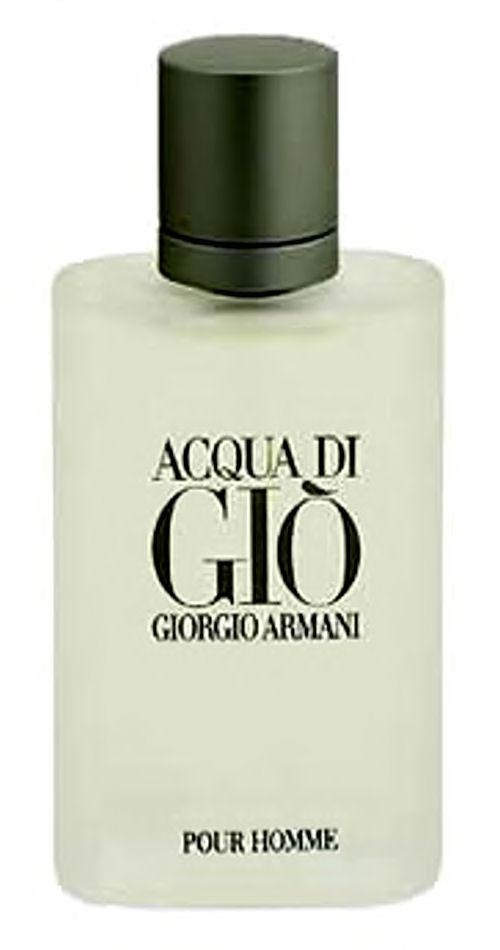
Giorgio Armani Acqua di Gio, designed by Jacques Cavallier

Cavallier considers his most successful perfumes to be the Issey Miyake L’Eau d’Issey . He has said that his favorite fragrances created by someone other than himself are Eau Sauvage by Christian Dior, created in 1966 by Edmond Roudnitska, and Opium by Yves Saint Laurent, created in 1977 by perfumers Jean-Louis Sieuzac, Jean Amic and Raymond Chaillan. Cavallier credits the synthetic jasmine-like molecule hedione (Methyl dihydrojasmonate) for contributing to the long-lasting freshness characteristic of Eau Savage, and has said that Opium reminds him of the great advances in perfumery that occurred in the late 1970s.

Cavallier has been described as a perfumer combining artistry with technical expertise, with a “mastery of several olfactory archetypes … [and] has a huge aesthetic range”, according to the New York Times perfume critic Chandler Burr.

In 2012, Cavallier left Firmenich to join the LVMH Luxury Group (Louis Vuitton Moët Hennessy SE) to formulate the first fragrance for Louis Vuitton, which was expected to be released in 2016. The LVMH Group owns several fragrance brands including Parfums Christian Dior, Guerlain, Parfums Givenchy, Kenzo Parfums and Fendi Perfumes. Jacques Cavallier collaborated with veteran perfumer François Demachy, who was already at LVMH, but Demachy was more involved with the technical and creative direction rather than as an in-house perfumer. LVMH has committed to building a new fragrance laboratory in Grasse, a reconstructed building on the site of a 17th-century bourgeoisie house, initially to be used for development of the Louis Vuitton and Parfums Christian Dior brands.

With Cavallier joining Louis Vuitton as its Master in-house perfumer, LVMH was said to be following a trend of having dedicated in-house perfumers working on luxury fragrance brands, which includes Jacques Polge at Chanel, Jean-Claude Ellena at Hermès, Mathilde Laurent at Cartier, Thomas Fontaine at Jean Patou, and Thierry Wasser at Guerlain.

=== Award(s) ===
In 2004, Jacques Cavallier was awarded the Prix François Coty, now known as the Prix International du Parfum.
