= Aromatics Elixir =

1971 perfume by Clinique (Estée Lauder Companies)

Fragrance by Clinique
- Category: Woody Floral / Green Chypre
- Designed for: Women
- Top notes: Primarily chamomile
- Heart notes: Primarily lily-of-the-valley
- Base notes: Primarily patchouli
- Released: 1971
- Label: Clinique
- Perfumer(s): Bernard Chant
- Tagline: "Intriguing non-conformist fragrance performs the role of perfume, but goes far beyond."
- Flanker(s): Aromatics Elixir Sheer Velvet Philtre Sensuel (2006); Aromatics Elixir Perfumer's Reserve (2011); Aromatics in White (2014); Aromatics in Black (2015); Aromatics Black Cherry (2016); Aromatics Elixir Premier (2017); Aromatics Elixir Fête des Mères (2022)

Aromatics Elixir is a woody floral or green chypre fragrance that was released under the name Aromatics in 1971 by Clinique, a subsidiary of Estée Lauder Companies, and then under its current name in 1974. Clinique started as a skincare company that offered fragrance-free products; this fragrance was originally marketed with the idea that some essential oils and other aromatics could offer aromatherapy benefits; the marketing about the ingredients was written after the fragrance formula was created.

== Fragrance ==
Bernard Chant at International Flavors & Fragrances created this fragrance with guidance from the Estée Lauder product director Ann Gottlieb. Chant was inspired by the rose and moss green accord in Paco Rabanne Calandre (1969), which was the first to use Evernyl for an oakmoss note. Gottlieb, who at the time was developing a patchouli fragrance for the Aramis division, influenced the decision to increase the patchouli. IFF's Tom Joy notes that Calandre's influence is difficult to detect because of the large amount of patchouli in Aromatics Elixir.

Notes include:

Top notes
Primarily chamomile; also clary-sage, green notes, neroli, orange blossom, and verbena
Middle notes
Primarily lily of the valley; also geranium, iris, jasmine, rose, tuberose, vetiver, and ylang-ylang
Base notes
Primarily patchouli; also civet, musk, oakmoss, and sandalwood

In their analysis of the fragrance, Calkin and Jellinek place Aromatics Elixir within a distinct family of patchouli-floral perfumes built around patchouli and hedione (a green jasmine scent). The characteristic accord of this family is a combination of patchouli, hedione, rose, hydroxycitronellal (green citrus, floral, melon, tropical scent), methyl ionone (floral, orris, powdery, and dry woody scent), and woody materials. Aromatics Elixir is an early representation of this family; other fragrances with a similar construction are Jean Couturier Coriandre (1973), Aramis Aramis 900 (1973), Paloma Picasso Paloma Picasso (1984), and Estée Lauder Knowing (1988).

== Fragrance line extensions ==
- Aromatics Elixir Sheer Velvet Philtre Sensuel (2006): A lighter reinterpretation
- Aromatics Elixir Perfumer's Reserve (2011): A 40th anniversary limited edition, with a reinterpretation of the original formula
- Aromatics in White (2014)
- Aromatics in Black (2015)
- Aromatics Black Cherry (2016)
- Aromatics Elixir Premier (2017)
- Aromatics Elixir Fête des Mères (2022): Limited edition release
