= Charles de Vilmorin =

French fashion designer (born 1996)

- Born: December 25, 1996 (age 29); Saint-Germain-en-Laye, France
- Education: École de la Chambre Syndicale de la Couture Parisienne
- Label: Charles de Vilmorin
- Awards: Finalist, LVMH Prize (2021)
- Website: www.charlesdevilmorin.fr

Charles de Vilmorin (born December 25, 1996) is a French fashion designer. A graduate of the École de la Chambre Syndicale de la Couture Parisienne, he launched his eponymous label on Instagram in April 2020, during the COVID-19 pandemic, and quickly attracted the attention of other designers. He made his debut on the Paris haute couture calendar in January 2021, and the following month he was named creative director of Rochas, a position he held until 2023. He was one of nine finalists for the 2021 LVMH Prize.

== Early life and education ==
Charles de Vilmorin was born on December 25, 1996, in Saint-Germain-en-Laye, and was brought up in Compiègne. His father was a financial director at a mass-market fashion brand, and de Vilmorin began sketching at the age of five; he originally wanted to become a theater director. He is the great-nephew of the French novelist and poet Louise Lévêque de Vilmorin. He graduated from the École de la Chambre Syndicale de la Couture Parisienne in June 2019.

== Career ==
After graduating, de Vilmorin struggled to find an internship, but a private collector bought most of his graduation collection. He used the money to fund his first collection, launched on Instagram in April 2020: a line of patchwork quilted bomber jackets inspired by the artist Niki de Saint Phalle. The collection quickly attracted the attention of designers Jean-Charles de Castelbajac and Christian Lacroix, and in November 2020 de Vilmorin was one of 15 emerging designers selected by Gucci creative director Alessandro Michele to participate in the GucciFest online festival.

In January 2021, de Vilmorin made his debut on the Paris haute couture calendar with his spring 2021 couture collection, presented in a video made with Studio L'Étiquette after Jean Paul Gaultier sponsored his guest appearance. The collection's hand-painted looks featured motifs of flowers, butterflies, and psychedelic nudes, worn by models of all genders with their faces and bodies painted in neon makeup. His early collections were noted for their vivid color, hand-painted prints, and puffer silhouettes.

In February 2021, two weeks after his couture debut, de Vilmorin was named creative director of Rochas, in charge of women's ready-to-wear at the house. His first collection for Rochas, for spring 2022, was presented in September 2021. De Vilmorin left Rochas two years later, in April 2023. Later that year, he was named president of the fashion jury for the October edition of the Hyères International Festival of Fashion, Photography and Fashion Accessories. De Vilmorin returned to the couture calendar with a fall 2021 collection shown almost entirely in black, and a spring 2022 collection presented in a video inspired by the Danse Macabre.

In 2021, de Vilmorin was one of nine finalists for the LVMH Prize for Young Designers, and a finalist for the Pierre Bergé Prize at the ANDAM Fashion Award.

In February 2024, de Vilmorin announced the launch of his label's first ready-to-wear line, a 25-piece collection for fall 2024 presented at the Sphère showroom during Paris Fashion Week. Made in Paris, the line included dresses, denim shorts, shirting, a trenchcoat, and new versions of his bomber jackets. He had previously worked with Galeries Lafayette as the guest designer for its 2023 holiday season.
