= Maureen Doherty =

British fashion designer

Maureen Doherty (10 December 1951 – 18 November 2022) was a British fashion designer.

== Biography ==
Born in London, Doherty was the youngest of three daughters of Elizabeth and James Doherty. Her father, a structural engineer with an interest in archaeology, introduced her early on to engineering projects and historical artefacts, inspiring her lifelong interest in ceramics.

Doherty studied pattern cutting at what later became the London College of Fashion. Initially interested in costume design, she briefly worked as a runner for film director David Lean. In 1970, she began working with Swedish designer Hans Metzen, subsequently establishing herself in retail fashion. Doherty became a buying director and contributed to opening several boutiques in London during the 1970s, notably Elle on Sloane Street, as well as shops for Fiorucci and Valentino. She was among the first to introduce Japanese designers, including Issey Miyake, to European countries.

Disillusioned with aspects of the fashion business by the late 1970s, Doherty moved to India in 1982, returning to Europe a year later. She subsequently accepted Miyake's offer to oversee his European operations, contributing to various projects, including early preparations for his fragrance L'eau d'Issey. During this period, Doherty commissioned architect David Chipperfield's first retail design project, a Miyake shop in London.

Encouraged by her mentor, potter Lucie Rie, Doherty relocated to Paris to study ceramics under Annie Fourmanoir. In 1985, she left Miyake and briefly operated her own small retail shop, which she later described as frequently burgled and unsatisfying.

Returning to London in 1992, Doherty became head of design at the fashion retailer Jigsaw before opening her own shop, Egg, in Kinnerton Street. Doherty lived for several years above Egg with her daughter Jessica. In 2017, architect Jonathan Tuckey redesigned and restructured the premises around Egg, including an adjoining former stable, reflecting Doherty's preference for minimalist spaces.
