= Lolita Lempicka =

French fashion designer and perfumer (born 1954)

Josiane Maryse Pividal, known professionally Lolita Lempicka (born in Bordeaux, 1954) is a French fashion designer and perfumer.

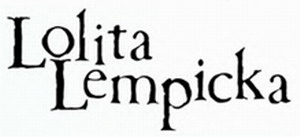
Brand logo

== Early life ==
An admirer of her mother's work as a seamstress, Lolita Lempicka dressed Barbie dolls herself at the age of six; as a teenager she crafted her own clothes. By 17 Lolita was studying fashion design at Studio Berçot.

== Career ==
From the age of six Lempicka was fascinated by wonderlands full of princesses and sumptuous dresses. She was inspired by fairy tales, such as Beauty and Beast, Peau d'Âne, and other tales of Charles Perrault, as well as fashion magazines such as Femmes d'Aujourd'hui and Marie Claire. When designing her collections, she drew inspiration from Coco Chanel, whom she discovered on French TV show Dim Dam Dom. Her inspiration was also drawn from the work of artists such as the photographer David Hamilton, the poet Jean Cocteau, pre-Raphaelite and symbolist painters, as well as Amedeo Modigliani, Picasso, Matisse, Gustave Moreau and Ingres. Lempicka's designs are also influenced by "the thirties and forties and their lace and silk negligee dresses, 18th-century Baroque and its dainty marchionesses". Her signature ivy leaf symbol is drawn from her interest in fairytales and nature.

Lolita began her career as an independent designer. In 1983, at 29, she presented her first collection with the help of her husband. In 1984, she opened the first Lolita Lempicka shop in the Marais district in Paris. That year, she also held her first fashion show in Tokyo, Japan. In 1985, Lempicka held her first fashion show in Paris. In 1986, she launched "Lolita Bis", a collection dedicated to young women. From 1987 to 1990, she was artistic director at Cacharel in charge of the Women and Children lines. In 1987, she started a long lasting partnership with the Japanese group Onward Kashiyama for a master license including fashion clothes and accessories (leather, sun glasses, jewelry, shoes, and lingerie). In 1990, she established her own fashion house in a townhouse on Avenue Marceau in Paris. In 1990 her collection was shown in a courtyard in the Louvre. Throughout the 1990s, she designed special collections for La Redoute, Trois Suisses or Monoprix. In 1994, Lolita Lempicka designed a collection dedicated to brides-to-be and opened another shop in the Marais district dedicated to wedding dresses, Les Mariées de Lolita. Wedding dresses play an important role in the designer's creative universe. In 1996, Lolita Lempicka launched LSD (Lolita Studio Design), a new casual and affordable fashion line. That year, her eldest daughter Elisa Melodie joined the fashion studio and started collaborating actively in the design of new collections. 1997 saw the introduction of Lempicka's first fragrance, "Lolita Lempicka", inspired by fairytales from her childhood. In the early 2000s, Pedro Winter, the Parisian music producer of Daft Punk and DJ, arranged the music of her fashion shows. In 2003, after studying art and fashion, Lolita's twins Lauren Leslie and Paulina Leonor joined the family business. In 2004, Lolita Lempicka celebrated 20 years of creation. On that occasion she published a book celebrating 20 years of design (« Lolita Lempicka : 20 ans de création"). That year, Lolita Lempicka associated her name with a premium car: Nissan Micra "Lolita Lempicka ». The partnership continues to-date, and three versions, including a convertible, were created since. In 2006, she resumed her partnership with La Redoute for a capsule collection. In 2007, she created a fashion clothes and lingerie line for Etam. That year, Lempicka also partnered with Nissan Motor Company to reinvent the Nissan Micra. In 2008, she launched another collection, including a wedding dress, for Trois Suisses. This year also saw the first year Lempicka designed a Samsung mobile phone. In 2009, she expanded her partnerships with luggage maker Delsey and organic product creator Bonneterre (tea, biscuits, chocolates) with Les Gourmandises de Lolita Lempicka. 2011 saw the second mobile phone partnership with Samsung by Lempicka. In 2012, she designed a capsule collection (fashion clothes and accessories) for the organic and ethical brand Ekyog.

=== Perfumes ===
In 1997, Lolita Lempicka launched the Lolita Lempicka perfume (now named Lolita Lempicka Le Premier Parfum), in an apple-shaped bottle. In 2012, Elle Fanning advertised this fragrance in a campaign created by Yoann Lemoine (Woodkid).

This was followed by:

- Lolita Lempicka au Masculin (2000), its first fragrance marketed to men, with an EDT strength launched in 2010
- L de Lolita Lempicka (2006), which featured a mermaid in print advertising
- Fleur de Corail (Coral Flower) (2008)
- Fleur Défendue (Forbidden Flower) (2008)
- Mon Rose (2009), a limited edition fragrance
- Si Lolita (2009), in a bottle shaped like a four-leaf clover with an EDT strength launched in 2011; advertised by Charlotte Le Bon, this became their third most successful feminine fragrance
- Lolita Lempicka L'Eau en Blanc (2012)
- Elle L'aime (2013), a white floral fragrance advertised by Sasha Pivovarova
- Sweet (2014)
- So Sweet (2016)
- Lolita Lempicka Mon Premier Parfum (2017), advertised by Thylane Blondeau
- Mon Eau (2018), a fruity floral fragrance
- Lolita Lempicka Elixir Sublime (2018)

In 2009, Lolita Lempicka Perfumes opened an online store.

=== Marketing ===
Lolita Lempicka has dressed many French actresses, such as Charlotte Gainsbourg and Anouk Grinberg in the film "Merci La Vie", Vanessa Paradis in "L'Arnacoeur" (Heartbreaker), Victoria Abril in "Gazon Maudit" (French Twist), and Mathilde Seigner in "Mariages!" (Marriages!). She also invited many actresses to wear her creations at fashion shows, such as Diane Kruger, Clotilde Courau, Élodie Bouchez, Emmanuelle Seigner, Laetitia Casta, Florence Thomassin, Marine Delterme, Valérie Kaprisky, Charlotte Valandrey, and Geraldine Pailhas. The brand is also regularly worn on the red carpet in Cannes. Lolita Lempicka has dressed Élodie Bouchez, Isabelle Huppert, Emmanuelle Béart, Chiara Mastroianni, Josiane Balasko, Laetitia Casta, Béatrice Dalle, Cécile Cassel, and Roxane Mesquida for the occasion in the past.

== Awards and honors ==
In 2002, Lolita Lempicka became a Chevalier of the Legion of Honor.

== Advocacy ==
In 2014, Lempicka appeared on La Nouvelle Edition on Canal+ to discuss her opposition to Air France's transport of monkeys to laboratories which she called a "waking nightmare" for the animals. In a letter to Air France, she wrote that she has instructed her employees to boycott the airline.

== Personal life ==
Lempicka married Joseph-Marie Pividal, a graphic designer. Lempicka has built her brand as a family business. Lolita's three daughters Elisa Melodie (born 1975), and twin daughters Paulina Leonor and Lauren Leslie (1983) are all actively involved in Lolita Lempicka. Melodie lives in New York and is responsible for the brand in the United States, while Leonor and Leslie work closely with their mother in Paris. Lempicka herself has appeared in the movies "Prêt-à-porter" and "Quelqu'un De Bien" (Slice of Life).
