= M7 (perfume) =

Men's fragrance by Yves Saint Laurent

M7 is a men's fragrance by Yves Saint Laurent launched in 2002 (discontinued). It was created by the perfumers Alberto Morillas and Jacques Cavallier. It is the first male scent from YSL since Tom Ford took creative control. The fragrance "M7 Oud Absolu" (2011) is somewhat different. The name might refer to the fact that the M7 was the seventh fragrance for men created by/for YSL. Brazilian perfume company Natura has recently launched a very similar fragrance called OUD Essencial which is undoubtedly a copy of M7.

- Top Notes: Bergamot, Mandarin, Rosemary.
- Middle Notes: Vetiver, Agarwood.
- Base Notes: Amber, Musk, Mandrake root.
