= L'eau d'Issey =

Perfume for women

Fragrance by Issey Miyake
- Released: 1992
- Label: Issey Miyake Parfums
- Flanker(s): L'eau d'Issey Pour Homme

L'eau d'Issey is a perfume for women produced for Japanese fashion designer Issey Miyake.

"L'eau d'Issey" means "the water of Issey" in French. It is also a pun on "odyssey". It was introduced in 1992. The "nose" for the perfume was Jacques Cavallier. Maureen Doherty also worked on it.

The fragrance is an aquatic floral, with top notes of Lotus, Melon, and Freesia, and a woody white musk base.

A flanker fragrance for men "L'eau d'Issey Pour Homme" was introduced in 1994 by Issey Miyake Parfums.
