= Dune (perfume) =

Perfume by Christian Dior

Fragrance by Christian Dior
- Released: 1991
- Label: Parfums Christian Dior
- Flanker(s): Dune pour Homme, 1997
- Website: Dune at Dior.com

Dune is a perfume for women by Parfums Christian Dior, introduced in 1991. It was created by perfumers Jean-Louis Sieuzac and Maurice Roger. Some controversy about the perfume ensued when another perfumer claimed that she was the owner of the intellectual property of the fragrance, a matter which came to trial at the French Cour de cassation. Dune is described as a homage to Christian Dior's birthplace Granville, "where sea meets land".

Dior released a spin-off fragrance for men, "Dune pour Homme", in 1997. It was created by perfumer Jean-Pierre Bethouart.
