= Dominique Ropion =

French master perfumer (born 1955)

- Born: 1955 (age 70–71); Paris, France
- Occupation: Perfumer

Dominique Ropion (French: [dɔminik ʁɔpjɔ̃]; born 1955) is a French master perfumer. Born in Paris, he trained at Roure Bertrand Dupont (now Givaudan perfumery school) in Grasse. After joining International Flavors & Fragrances Inc. in 2000, Ropion has worked for fragrance brands including Christian Dior, Thierry Mugler, Lancôme, Givenchy, Frédéric Malle, Issey Miyake, Yves Saint Laurent, Paco Rabanne and The Body Shop.

== Awards and recognition ==
Ropion has received Cosmetique Magazine Oscar (2010), the Chevalier de l’Ordre des Arts et des Lettres (2012), the Cosmetic Valley's International Fragrance Prize or Prix François Coty (2008). He received the title of Master Perfumer in 2018.

== List of creations ==
- Yardley London Lace (1982)
- Givenchy Ysatis (1984)
- Givenchy Amarige (1991)
- Kenzo Jungle Elephant (1996)
- Calvin Klein Euphoria
- Thierry Mugler Alien
- Dior Pure Poison (2001)
- Frédéric Malle Vétiver Extraordinaire (2002)
- Cacharel Amor Amor (2003)
- Viktor & Rolf Flowerbomb (2004)
- Frédéric Malle Carnal Flower (2005)
- Calvin Klein Euphoria (2005)
- Burberry London (2007)
- Frédéric Malle Geranium pour Monsieur (2009)
- Yves Saint Laurent La Nuit de L'Homme (2009)
- Frédéric Malle Portrait of a Lady (2010)
- Paco Rabanne Lady Million (2010)
- Lancôme La Vie Est Belle (2012)
- Frédéric Malle The Night (Al-Layl) (2014)
- Frédéric Malle Cologne Indelebile (2015)
- Paco Rabanne Olympea (2015)
- Elie Saab Girl of Now Forever (2019)
- Régime des Fleurs Al-Dukhan
- Madawi Gold Arabian Oud
- Roger & Gallet Bois d'Orange
- O Boticário Clash
- Penhaligon's Eau de Audacity (2023)
- Miu Miu Miutine (2025)
- Miu Miu Miutine Intense (2026)
