= Xeryus =

Eau de toilette by Givenchy

Xeryus is a men's eau de toilette manufactured by Givenchy.

The cologne was introduced in 1986 and comes in a spray bottle.

Its scent is a blend of citrus, violet, jasmine, spices, musk and amber.

A follow-up perfume Xeryus Rouge created by Firmenich was introduced in 1996.

== See also ==
- Parfums Givenchy
- Perfume
- List of perfumes
