= Rive Gauche (perfume) =

Women's fragrance by Yves Saint Laurent

Fragrance by Yves Saint Laurent
- Released: 1971
- Label: Yves Saint Laurent
- Tagline: Ce n'est pas un parfum pour les femmes effacées

Rive Gauche is a women's perfume launched by Yves Saint Laurent in 1971.

The fragrance was composed in 1969 by perfumers Jacques Polge and Michael Hy at Roure. It was reformulated by Daniela Andrier and Jacques Hy at Givaudan in 2003. The all-aluminium silver and cobalt blue striped bottle was designed by Pierre Dinnand.

The perfume was named after Yves Saint Laurent's newly opened boutique in Saint-Germain-des-Prés, the first ready-to-wear store opened by a couturier.

Perfume critic Luca Turin considered Rive Gauche as the "best floral aldehydic of all time". It is a classic aldehyde with a floral heart and woody base notes.
