= Jungle Gardenia =

1933/1938 perfume by Tuvaché

Fragrance by Tuvaché
- Category: Amber Floral / White Floral
- Designed for: Women
- Top notes: Primarily neroli
- Heart notes: Primarily gardenia
- Base notes: Primarily vanilla
- Released: 1933
- Label: Tuvaché
- Perfumer(s): Bernadine Angus
- Tagline: "The most exotic fragrance in the world"

Jungle Gardenia is a fragrance released in 1933 (1938 retail) by Tuvaché which became a favorite of popular entertainers, including Joan Crawford, Ava Gardner, Michael Jackson, Frank Sinatra, Elizabeth Taylor, Natalie Wood, and Fay Wray.

== The Tuvaché company ==
Tuvaché was an American company that took its name from a character in Madame Bovary. The founder, Bernadine (Bernie) de Tuvache Angus was an artist from Judsonia, Arkansas. Like her mother, who was a noted artist, she painted, created etchings, and wrote plays including the 1937 play that was turned into the movie Fog Island. During a visit to the Mediterranean, she began researching essential oils and the historic perfumes used by Cleopatra, Catherine de' Medici, Helen of Troy, Madame du Barry, Madame de Pompadour, and Joséphine de Beauharnais. This turned into a serious interest and vocation, and she studied perfumery under a French chemist. She considered perfumery to be another fine art.

Jungle Gardenia was her first commercial fragrance. She had no marketing experience, no capital for promotion, and she filled and packaged the perfume in her apartment when she got a placement at Saks Fifth Avenue. Some of the initial business growth was because French fragrances were not being imported into the US during World War II. By 1945, she made headlines by creating some of the most expensive perfumes available, from rare materials (Jasmin of Egypt and Zezan). She died in 1948 at the age of 48. Her husband, Howard Angus, had worked in advertising and in upper management at NBC, and he continued her work as a perfume manufacturer until his death in 1956.

== Fragrance ==
Bernadine Angus created this perfume. It smells strongly of gardenias, but that scent cannot be extracted from the flower so it is always created synthetically. This perfume mixed a gardenia-tuberose accord with methyl salicylate, which gave it a hint of camphor. The concentrate was dissolved in an oil instead of alcohol, which gave it longevity.

The fragrance has fresh, herbal top notes; floral middle notes; and balsamic base notes:

Top notes
Primarily neroli; also clary sage, cyclamen, green notes, and ylang-ylang
Middle notes
Primarily gardenia; also heliotrope, jasmine, orange blossom, tuberose, and violet leaf
Base notes
Primarily vanilla; also benzoin, civet, musk, sandalwood, oakmoss, and tolu balsam

== Ownership timeline ==
- After 1956: After Howard Angus died, Durel A. Dugas acquired the company.
- 1959: Dugas sold the company to Germaine Monteil Cosmétiques.
- 1968: British American Tobacco bought Germaine Monteil. In 1970, Tuvaché, Yardley of London, and its other cosmetic companies were folded into their British American Cosmetics Ltd. holding company.
- 1984: Beecham Group bought the British American Cosmetics holding company. They had previously acquired Jōvan (company) in 1979, and Jōvan served as an anchor for their expanding cosmetics and fragrance division.
- 1988: Beecham sold its US cosmetics and fragrance division, including Tuvaché, to its own management team in a leveraged buyout. The new company was named Quintessence Inc.
- 1989: Production of the original Jungle Gardenia formulation ceased.

Reformulation and brief relaunch:

- 1991: Joh. A. Benckiser acquired Quintessence. In 1992, Benckiser acquired Coty from Pfizer.
- 1993: Benckiser merged Quintessence (formerly Jōvan) with Coty.
- 1995: Coty substantially reformulated Jungle Gardenia to include tropical fruit top notes and briefly reissued it. Coty abandoned the Tuvache and Jungle Gardenia trademark names after the failed reformulation.

Trademark split:

- Tuvaché Gardenia 1933: In 1999, Irma Shorell Inc. and their Long Lost Perfumes division bought the rights to the Tuvaché brand name but not the Jungle Gardenia name. In 2012–2013, Irma Shorell Inc. folded its legacy fragrance portfolio, including the Tuvaché brand name, into Hypoluxe Inc. Under the Hypoluxe umbrella, they launched their interpretation as Tuvaché Gardenia 1933.
- Jungle Gardenia by Evyan Perfumes: Arthur H. Garceau bought abandoned trademarks, including the ones for Evyan and Jungle Gardenia. Under the name Timeless Perfumes, they released a fragrance named Jungle Gardenia by Evyan Perfumes.
