= Jean Carles =

French perfumer (1892–1966)

Jean Carles (12 January 1892–8 July 1966) was a French perfumer who worked in Roure Bertrand Fils et Justin Duppont in Grasse (now part of Givaudan) in the early 20th century. He was the founder of the Roure Perfumery School (French: De L'école de Parfumerie de Roure située à Grasse) and served as its first director in 1946.

Jean Carles was also the mentor of many perfumers including Monique Schlienger and Jacques Polge.

Despite becoming anosmic towards the end of his life, Carles created works such as Carven Ma Griffe and Christian Dior Miss Dior using only his memory of odours to guide him. His condition was only known to his son Marcel Carles, who assisted Jean by smelling and commenting on his creations. Due to this remarkable feat, Jean Carles is often compared to Beethoven who continued to compose music after becoming profoundly deaf.

== Training technique ==
Carles also devised a training technique bearing his name (Jean Carles Method) for learning about natural and synthetic perfumery materials. Sixty of these odourants are arranged in a table format, which is organised by classes. Students first learn the contrasts between classes of odourants; floral, woody etc which are arranged in columns. They then proceed to compare and contrast the materials within each class, which are set out in rows. For example, in the floral column there will be rose, jasmine etc, and in the row for rose, its constituents such as phenyl ethyl alcohol, geraniol etc will be listed.

This memorization technique and its variants are still widely used to train novice perfumers to understand perfumery materials.

== Method of composition ==
Jean Carles was the first to set about composing perfumes on a rational basis. Instead of the trial and error method he had observed as a student, he conducted many trials with pairs of materials to see how they would combine.

Carles carried out numerous trials with oakmoss for example, combining it with different materials and in different ratios. This might involve, say, oak moss and patchouli mixed in the ratios of 1 oakmoss to 9 patchouli, 2 moss to 8 patchouli, 3 to 7 etc right up to 9 moss and 1 patchouli. One of the blends, say 3/7 oakmoss to patchouli, would be selected to form the basis of another series of experiments, which might be with vetiver for example. In this way a perfume would be composed in increments, and not all at once on a haphazard basis, as was often the way at the time.

The relative volatility of perfumery materials was also investigated by Carles, and this allowed him to refine his method of perfume composition by building a structure from the bottom up. First the base notes are blended, and then the process continues through the middle notes to the most volatile and fleeting top notes which are found at the head of a perfume, and which are the ones immediately smelled when a perfume is first sprayed.

== Works ==
His creations included:

- Lucien Lelong Tout Lelong (1927)
- Dana Tabu (1932)
- Lucien Lelong Indiscret (1935)
- Dana Canoe (1935)
- Lucien Lelong Elle...Elle... (1937)
- Schiaparelli Shocking! (1937)
- Lucien Lelong Tailspin (1940)
- Carven Ma Griffe (1946)
- Lucien Lelong Orgueil (1946)
- Christian Dior, Miss Dior (1947), with Paul Vacher

== Books ==
Carles's landmark articles titled "A Method of Creation in Perfumery", published in 1961 and 1962 in the journal Soap, Perfumery & Cosmetics, is freely available online.
