= Calice Becker =

French perfumer (born c.1964)

Calice Asancheyev-Becker (born c. 1964) is a French master perfumer and director of Givaudan Perfumery School. As of 2018 she was president of the International Society of Perfume Creators.

Becker has won the Lifetime Achievement Award from The Fragrance Foundation. Luca Turin and Tania Sanchez's Perfumes: The Guide praised many of Becker's creations, including a five-star rating for Beyond Paradise (2004, a “masterful portrait of a gorgeously fresh, fictional, ideal tropical flower”), Beyond Paradise for Men, and Tommy Girl (1996), calling the latter one of the most important of all time because of its influence. Chandler Burr, perfume critic for The New York Times, wrote of Becker’s 1999 creation for Dior, “It makes me think of a setting sun hitting a gold chain — gold has no scent, but if it did, it would smell like J’Adore.”

== List of creations ==
- Balmain Monsieur Balmain (reformulation, 1990)
- Balmain Vent Vert (reformulation, 1991)
- Tommy Hilfiger Tommy Girl (1996)
- Joop What About Adam (1997)
- Avon Women of Earth (1998)
- Christian Dior J’Adore (1999)
- Avon Dreamlife (2002)
- Donna Karan DKNY Energy for her (2002)
- Donna Karan DKNY Energy for him (2002)
- Estee Lauder Beyond Paradise for Men (2004)
- Estee Lauder Beyond Paradise for women (2004)
- Tommy Hilfiger Tommy Girl 10 (2006, with Stephen Nilsen)
- Donna Karan Gold (2006)
- Estee Lauder Beyond Paradise Blue (2006)
- Lancôme Cuir de Lancôme (2007, with Pauline Zanoni)
- By Kilian A Taste of Heaven (2007)
- By Kilian Beyond Love (2007)
- By Kilian Liaisons Dangereuses (2007)
- By Kilian Love, Don't be shy (2007)
- By Kilian Prelude to Love (2008)
- Davidoff Silver Shadow Private with Jacques Huclier (2008)
- Calvin Klein Secret Obsession (2008)
- By Kilian Back to Black: Aphrodisiac (2009)
- By Kilian Pure Oud (2009)
- Payard Bergamot Truffle (2009)
- Payard Lychee Mousse (2009)
- Payard Pistachio Ganache (2009)
- Marc Jacobs Lola (2009, with Yann Vasnier)
- Vera Wang Rock Princess (2009)
- DKNY Delicious Ripe Raspberry (2010)
- DKNY Juicy Berry (2010)
- By Kilian Love and Tears (2010)
- By Kilian Rose Oud (2010)
- By Kilian Playing With The Devil (2013)
- Oscar de la Renta Mi Corazon (2013)
- Oscar de la Renta Coralina (2013)
- Oscar de la Renta Granada (2013)
- Oscar de la Renta Oriental Lace (2013)
- Oscar de la Renta Sargasso (2013)
- Oscar de la Renta Santo Domingo (2013)
- Avon Far Away Gold (2014)
- By Kilian Sacred Wood (2014)
- By Kilian Imperial Tea (2014)
- By Kilian Intoxicated (2014)
- Oscar De La Renta Oscar Flor (2015)
- By Kilian Moonlight in Heaven (2016)
- Ralph Lauren Collection Lime (2016)
- Versace Dylan Blue (2016)
- Versace pour femme Dylan Blue (2017)
- Narciso Rodriguez for Her Fleur Musc (2017)
- Essential Parfums The Musk (2018)
- Arquiste Indigo Smoke (2021)
- By Kilian Kologne (2022)

== Bibliography ==
- Turin, Luca; Sanchez, Tania (2010). Perfumes: The A-Z Guide. Profile Books. ISBN 978-1-84765-152-5.
- Turin, Luca; Sanchez, Tania (2018). Perfumes: The Guide 2018. Perfüümista ÖÜ. ISBN 978-9949-88-553-4.
