= Opium (perfume) =

Perfume by Yves Saint Laurent

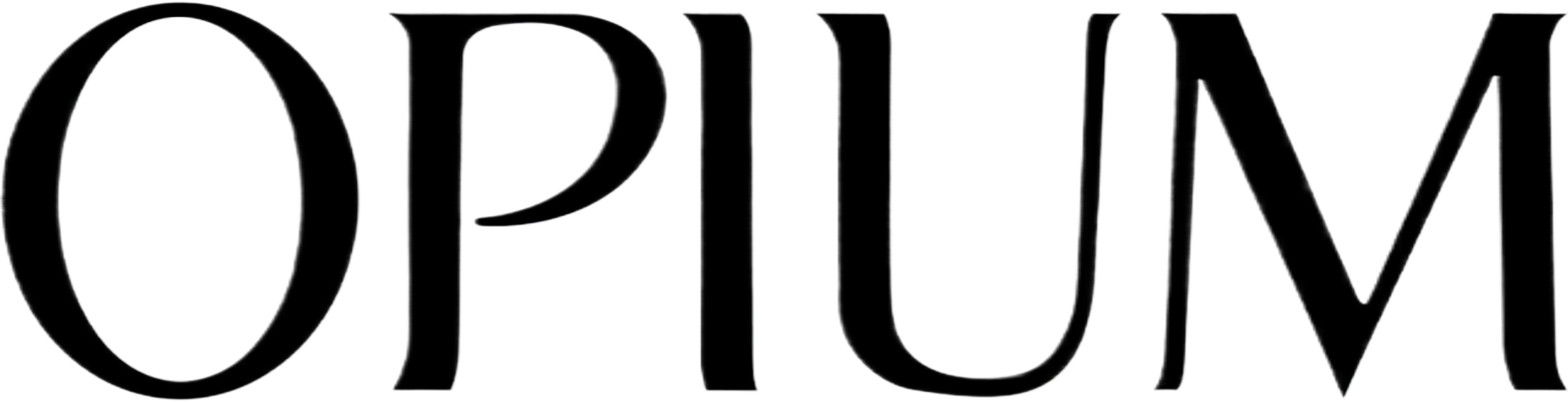
- Brand logo

Fragrance by Yves Saint Laurent
- Category: Oriental-spicy
- Designed for: Women
- Top notes: Mandarin orange, plum, clove, coriander, pepper, bay leaf
- Heart notes: Jasmine, rose, lily of the valley, carnation, cinnamon, peach, orris root
- Base notes: Sandalwood, cedarwood, myrrh, opopanax, labdanum, benzoin resin, castoreum, amber, musk, patchouli, tolu balsam, vetiver
- Released: 1977
- Label: Yves Saint Laurent
- Perfumer(s): Jean Amic, Jean-Louis Sieuzac
- Concentration: Eau de toilette, eau de parfum
- Tagline: "A spicy ambery harmony for extreme sensuality"
- Flanker(s): Flanker fragrances: Opium pour Homme; Belle d'Opium; Black Opium
- Predecessor: Eau Libre
- Successor: Paris
- Website: Opium Eau de Toilette (YSL)

Opium is an Oriental-spicy perfume for women, created for the French fashion house Yves Saint Laurent by perfumers Jean Amic and Jean-Louis Sieuzac. Introduced to the market in 1977, Opium quickly generated publicity with its controversial name and the ensuing press coverage helped to increase its sales. In late 2000, an advertising campaign for the product featured English model Sophie Dahl, whose nudity and bodily expressions in the advertisement were met with mixed reactions internationally.

The top notes of Opium are a mixture of fruits and spices, with mandarin orange, (Note: Jan Moran lists "hesperides" instead.) plum, clove, coriander and pepper, as well as bay leaf. Its floral middle notes consist predominantly of poppy jasmine, rose and lily of the valley, in addition to carnation, cinnamon, peach and orris root. It is underlined by the sweet woody base note containing sandalwood, cedarwood, myrrh, opopanax, labdanum, benzoin resin and castoreum, in addition to amber, musk, patchouli, tolu balsam and vetiver.

== Naming and theme ==
Opium caused a stir with its controversial name and brought accusations that the brand designer Yves Saint Laurent was condoning drug use. In the United States, a group of Chinese Americans demanded a change of the name and a public apology from Saint Laurent for "his insensitivity to Chinese history and Chinese American concerns." They formed a committee called the American Coalition Against Opium and Drug Abuse, which expressed outrage at the choice of a name representing "a menace that destroyed many lives in China." However, the ensuing press coverage helped to increase the sales, with the perfume soon becoming a best-selling product.

For its promotional U.S. launch party in 1978, the German ship Peking—named after the Chinese city of Beijing—was rented from the South Street Seaport Museum and draped with colorful banners, the well-known American novelist Truman Capote sitting at its helm at the event. Peking, along with a 1,000-pound (450 kg) bronze statue of the Buddha that was decorated with white cattleya orchids, displayed the supposed Eastern theme of the perfume at the party. The brand conveyed the theme into the red plastic container holding the perfume's glass vial, which Pierre Dinand designed based on inro—the small Japanese lacquered cases that were worn hanging from the obi and held perfumes, herbs and medicines.

== Advertising campaign controversy ==
A poster advertising campaign for the perfume caused another controversy in October–November 2000. It featured English model Sophie Dahl lying on her back naked except for a necklace, a bracelet and a pair of stiletto heels, with her eyes closed, seemingly in the throes of ecstasy, and her legs spread apart as she covers one of her nipples with her hand, leaving the other exposed. This advertising campaign, photographed by Steven Meisel, was widely seen in print advertisements and posters in bus shelters across many countries. It won an award in Spain but was met with negative reactions in some places, particularly in the United Kingdom. The British Advertising Standards Authority received more than 700 complaints from the public, and ordered the posters to be withdrawn on the grounds that they were too sexually suggestive, degrading to women, and likely to cause "serious or widespread offence". American journalist Susan Faludi argued that certain perfume advertising campaigns pushed "idealization of weak yielding women" to the extreme, citing the Opium advertisement as a primary example.

== Opium pour Homme ==
Opium pour Homme is a men's fragrance by French fashion house Yves Saint Laurent (YSL). It was launched in 1995 as the male complement to the women's Opium (1977) and was created by perfumer Jacques Cavallier of Firmenich.

=== History and creation ===
YSL launched the male complement Opium pour Homme in 1995, created by Jacques Cavallier of Firmenich.

=== Composition ===
Its main note is set by vanilla, with black currant, galangal, star anise, ginger and pepper, fusing with base notes of cedar and Tolu balsam.

According to Perfume Intelligence encyclopaedia:

- Top notes: cassis, star anise, lemon grass and pepper
- Heart notes: oriental woods, patchouli, sandalwood and Guaïac wood
- Base notes: Tolu balsam, cedar and amber

In commercial classification:

- Top: Star Anise, Black Currant
- Heart: Sichuan Pepper, Galanga
- Base: Bourbon Vanilla, Tolu Balsam, Atlas Cedar

The aromatic profile is described as soft spicy, powdery, anis, vanilla, fruity, amber, fresh spicy, woody, balsamic, and floral notes.

=== Bottle design ===
Its flask was designed by Jérôme Faillant-Dumas. It is described as a tall rounded tactile clear bottle with a black cap designed by Jerome Faillant-Dumas.

The Eau de Parfum version from 1995 is known among collectors as Opium pour Homme EDP (Blue Case - 1995). The EDT is the transparent bottle you show, the EDP is the dark navy blue bottle with gold ring.

=== Flankers and editions ===
- Opium Pour Homme Eau de Parfum (1995) - Name: Opium Pour Homme Eau de Parfum | Year: 1995 - A Spicy Amber fragrance created by Jacques Cavallier in 1995
- Opium pour Homme Eau d'Orient (2006) - With notes of white pepper, bergamot, grapefruit, star anise, ginger, bamboo, vetiver, sandalwood and amber.

=== Discontinuation ===
Opium pour Homme is now officially discontinued.

1. The Eau de Parfum is listed as: It is now discontinued and rare. 2. Retail listings show: Is Discontinued By Manufacturer 3. Vintage market: Vintage Opium pour Homme Yves Saint Laurent 100ml, 1995 Oriental Spicy Scent, Discontinued Men's Eau de Toilette, Rare Vintage Cologne

The discontinuation is linked to the L'Oréal takeover of YSL Beauté. As noted in fragrance communities: The EdP wasn't available couple of years ago, it was considered discontinued, coincidentally in the same time-frame when L'oreal took over Ysl. L'Oréal focused on new launches like Black Opium (2014) and discontinued historic masculines.

Today, both EDT and EDP original formulations are only available on the vintage secondary market and are considered highly collectible, with longevity reported as 8+ hours.

=== Advertising ===
- 1995-1998: Rupert Everett - He was the face of Yves St. Laurent's Opium campaign from 1995 to 1998 and his glamorous looks earned him a contract as the face of the cologne Opium for Men in 1995. He is famously referenced as the face of Yves Saint Laurent Opium Pour Homme.
- 1999: Alessandro Gassmann - European campaign.

== Commercials ==
In 1992 and 1999, U.S. film director David Lynch created commercials for Opium.
