= Cacharel =

French fashion company

Jean Cacharel SA
- Type: Private
- Industry: Fashion
- Founded: 1958; 68 years ago
- Founder: Jean Bousquet
- Headquarters: Paris, France
- Area served: Worldwide
- Products: Apparel, eyewear, watches, accessories, fragrances
- Website: cacharel.fr

Jean Cacharel SA (French: [kaʃaʁɛl]) is a French company of ready-to-wear clothing, perfume and accessories, founded in 1958 by Jean Bousquet. Cacharel designs are characterized by their youthful style, femininity, lightness, refinement, and use of bright colours. Cacharel is named after the local name of the garganey (Spatula querquedula, a small duck) in the Camargue (cacharel, standard French sarcelle d'été).

== History ==
Cacharel was created in 1958 by the French politician Jean Bousquet in Nîmes, where he was mayor of the commune for two mandates.

Jean Bousquet was the son of a sewing machine salesman; he was immersed in the world of clothes-making since childhood. He trained to be a tailor at a technical college and worked for two years as a designer before returning to Paris to found his own fashion house in Le Marais. The success of his first collection inspired him to create Cacharel.

The pink seersucker blouse designed in the autumn of 1963, worn by the model Nicole de Lamargé on the cover of Elle in 1966 in a photograph by Peter Knapp, became a best-seller and launched Cacharel onto the international stage.

A number of designers subsequently moved to Cacharel, including his sister-in-law Corinne Sarrut, agnès b., Lolita Lempicka, Emmanuelle Khanh, Corinne Cobson, Japanese designer Atsuro Tayama, the duo Mark Eley and Wakako Kishimoto (who brought back the romantic style with an emphasis on Liberty prints), and Clemens Ribeiro. From 2009 to 2011, Cédric Charlier was in charge of women's design at Cacharel, with 4 seasons. He was replaced in 2011 by Ling Liu and Dawei Sun.

From 2009 to 2012, Cacharel had a licensing agreement with Aeffe Group to manufacture and distribute the line worldwide. In 2010, the brand sold its men’s wear division to Turkey’s Aydınlı Group, which had held the license for 14 years, for an undisclosed sum. In 2017, Aydınlı Group Ownership switched into Turkey's TMSF Fund due connections of FETÖ,Later in 2025, TMSF Sold Aydınlı Group's Company's, Including Turkish Licensee of Cacharel, U.S Polo ASSN and French Pierre Cardin, To HRK Holding (Known with brand Saat&Saat).

In 2014, Cacharel suspended production of its children and men’s lines to focus exclusively on women’s ready-to-wear. It reintroduced the men’s line in 2019.

In 2016, Cacharel commissioned architect Jean Nouvel to design the concept for its French stores.

== Fragrances ==
Cacharel's fragrances include:

- Anaïs Anaïs (1978): a green floral created by Paul Léger, Raymond Chaillan, Robert Gonnon, and Roger Pellegrino.
- LouLou (1987): a floral amber created by Jean Guichard.
- Eden (fragrance) (1994): a floral created by Jean Guichard.
- Noa (1998): a woody floral musk created by Olivier Cresp.
- Gloria (2002): a woody amber created by Olivier Cresp.
- Amor Amor (2003): a fruity floral created by Laurent Bruyère and Dominique Ropion.

== Licenses and partnerships ==
Since 1975 Bousquet commissioned L'Oréal to create a perfume for his brand; the successful Anaïs Anaïs was launched in 1978. It was followed by Cacharel pour l'Homme, Loulou, Eden, Loulou Blue, Eau d'Eden, Noa, Nemo, Gloria, Amor Amor, Amor Amor Eau Fraiche, Noa Fleur, Noa Perle, Promesse, Amor pour homme and Scarlett. The perfume "Liberté", is an orange chypre with fresh citrus top notes inspired by a traditional French cake called 'chamonix' and woody heart and base notes with patchouli.

In 1997, for an exhibition at the New National Museum of Monaco, Cacharel dressed a Barbie doll.

The jewelry and watch license is managed by Christian Bernard Group. Several other licenses have been granted to market products under the Cacharel brand such as business gifts by Plastoria; tableware by Hankook; notebooks by Clairefontaine and underwear by Éminence. Shortterm collaborations were made with other brands like Eastpak for bags in 2009 and Uniqlo for t-shirts in 2011.

In 2012, Cacharel signed a four-year licensing agreement with Hong Kong-based Mondottica for the production and worldwide distribution of its first lines of optical frames and sunglasses for women, men and children.

== Campaigns ==
The person representing Liberté in ad campaigns was Gisele Bündchen, who was also the new face for the brand Cacharel Parfums. Kate Moss modeled for Anaïs Anaïs and Laetitia Casta for Promesse. British-Ethiopian singer-songwriter Izzy Bizu became the face of the New Cacharel fragrance, Yes I Am in 2018.

In 2022, Shay Mitchell from Pretty Little Liars, released a lipstick-shaped fragrance bottle.

In 2023, Cacharel announced that actress, Skai Jackson, would be the new face of the Yes I Am Bloom Up! fragrance.

== Criticism ==
As of 2022, Jean Cacharel continued its operations in Russia, maintaining its business activities and sales in the country despite its invasion of Ukraine. The company faced criticism for not altering its operations in Russia amid global calls for businesses to cease activities in the country.

== Shareholding ==
Cacharel is owned by Jean Bousquet's family which holds 80% stake in the company and by Novinvest of Rothschild, which holds 20%.
