= Serge Lutens =

French fashion designer (born 1942)

- Born: 14 March 1942 (age 84); Lille, France
- Occupations: perfumer; photographer; filmmaker; hair stylist; fashion designer
- Website: Official website

Serge Lutens (born 14 March 1942) is a French fashion designer, perfume creator, photographer, filmmaker and hair stylist. He is known principally for the fashion house and fragrance company which bears his name. The company's best-selling fragrances are Datura Noir, Tubereuse Criminelle, Dent de Lait, Un Bois Vanille, Ambre Sultan, Five O Clock Au Gingembre, Fille en Aiguilles, Nuit de Cellophane, Jeux de Peau, Fleurs de Citronnier, Santal Majuscule.

== Career ==
At 14 years old, Lutens was taken on as an apprentice by a hair salon in Lille, a period which he described as crucial to his appreciation of beauty in three dimensions. Lutens started to experiment with makeup and photography, using friends to pose as models.

In 1962 Lutens moved to Paris, where Vogue hired him to create makeup, hair and jewellery. Throughout the 1960s he collaborated with photographers such as Richard Avedon, Bob Richardson and Irving Penn.

In 1967 Christian Dior commissioned Lutens to create a makeup line.

in 1973, Serge Lutens' series of photographs (inspired by the artists Claude Monet, Georges-Pierre Seurat, Pablo Picasso and Amedeo Modigliani) was shown at the Guggenheim Museum in New York.

In 1974 he made a short movie, "Les Stars", and in 1976, "Suaire". Both were shown at the Cannes Film Festival.

Throughout the 1980s he shot various advertising campaigns and films and designed makeup and packaging. These works won him two 'Lions d’Or' at the International Advertising Film Festival.

In 2000, Lutens launched his own brand "Parfums-Beaute Serge Lutens". Among its notable fragrances is Cuir Mauresque, a composition centered on leather accords.

For four consecutive years, 2001 to 2004, Lutens was awarded the FiFi Award for Best Original Concept.

In 2014, Lutens unveiled Section d'Or – a radical collection that sets no limits or price to artistry.

Lutens currently lives in Marrakesh, Morocco.

== Books ==
- L'Esprit Serge Lutens: The Spirit of Beauty (Editions Assouline, Paris, 1992) (ISBN 2-908228-05-X)
- Serge Lutens (Editions Assouline, Paris, 1998) (ISBN 2-84323-066-7)
- Berlin à Paris (Editions Electa Milan, 2012)
- Serge Lutens Moscou (Les salons du Palais Royal Shiseido S.A, Japan 2015)
