= Rabanne (fashion house) =

French fashion house

- Industry: Fashion
- Founder: Paco Rabanne
- Headquarters: Paris, France
- Number of locations: 4 (2026)
- Key people: Olivier Rousteing (Creative Director); Diane Kendal (Beauty Creative Director)
- Parent: Puig
- Website: rabanne.com

Rabanne (formerly Paco Rabanne) is a French luxury fashion house founded in 1966 by Paco Rabanne. The house is well-known for its influence to "Space Age style", notably the use of non-traditional materials, such as small-metal plates. Rabanne produces a range of products including ready-to-wear, accessories, footwear, beauty, and fragrance, from 1966 to 1999 the house also produced couture.

Since 1987, Rabanne has been under the control of Puig. Puig has produced fragrances under the name since 1968. Olivier Rousteing was appointed creative director of the house in 2026, his first collection will be presented in March 2027.

== History ==
In 1968, a fragrance line was launched under a licensing agreement with Puig. Puig would acquire the company in 1986. In 1999, the couture line was discontinued.

In 2023, the house rebranded from Paco Rabanne to Rabanne. A makeup line launched the same year stocked exclusively in Selfridges, Sephora and Ulta. A collaboration with H&M was released by years end.

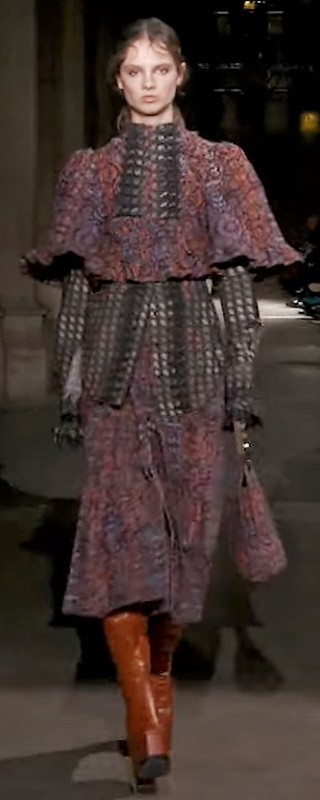
Giselle Norman at Paco Rabanne F/W 2020/2021

In July 2026, Olivier Rousteing was appointed creative director of Rabanne, succeeding Julien Dossena, who had led the fashion house for 13 years.

=== Boutiques ===
In 2016, a boutique of 60 m^{2} (650 sq ft) in size opened at 12 Rue Cambon in Paris. In 2020, a boutique opened at 54 Rue du Faubourg Saint-Honoré, it would close by 2022. In January 2022 a 1,650 sq ft (153 m^{2}) size flagship was opened at 39 Avenue Montaigne, the space was previously a Nina Ricci boutique.

== Creative directors ==
=== Couture, from 1966 to 1999 ===
- Paco Rabanne, 1966–1999

=== Ready-to-wear ===
==== Womenswear, since 1990 ====
- Christophe Decarnin, 1993–1999
- Aurelian Tremblay, 1993–1999
- Paco Rabanne, 1999
- Rosemary Rodriguez, 2000–2004
- Patrick Robinson, 2004–2007
- Manish Arora, 2011–2012
- Lydia Maurer, 2012–2013
- Julien Dossena, 2013–2026
- Olivier Rousteing, 2026–present

==== Menswear, from 2019 ====
- Julien Dossena, 2019

== Perfumes ==
In 1968 Paco Rabanne and Puig began working together and in 1969 the first Paco Rabanne fragrance "Calandre" was launched.

1 Million was launched in 2008 and it was the last scent that Paco Rabanne helped developed. Since the launch, it has been Rabanne's most popular mens fragrance and one of the most popular worldwide. In 2022, Women's Wear Daily rated the fragrance as one of the 100 greatest fragrances. Subsequent line extensions include:

- 1 Million Intense" (2013)
- 1 Million Cologne (2015)
- 1 Million Privé (2016)
- 1 Million Lucky (2018)
- 1 Million Parfum (2020)
- 1 Million Elixir (2022)
- 1 Million Royal (2023)
- 1 Million Golden Oud (2023)
- Million Gold (2024)
- Million Gold Elixir (2025)
- 1 Million Night Elixir (2026)

Marketed to women:

- Lady Million (2010)
- Lady Million Eau My Gold! (2014)
- Lady Million Merry Millions! (2015)
- Lady Million Privé (2016)
- Lady Million Lucky (2018)
- Lady Million Empire (2019)
- Lady Million Fabulous (2021)
- Lady Million Royal (2023)

Additionally, 1 Million and Lady Million fragrances were launched in collaboration with Monopoly and Pac-Man.

Olympéa was launched in 2015; its line extensions include:

- Olympéa Aqua (2016)
- Olympéa Legend (2019)
- Olympéa Blossom (2021)
- Olympéa Solar (2022)
- Olympéa Flora (2023)

Fame was launched in 2022 with an ad campaign featuring actress Elle Fanning; its line extension include:

- Fame Blooming Pink (2023)

Invictus was launched in 2013; its line extensions include:

- Invictus Legend (2019)
- Invictus Victory (2021)
- Invictus Platinum (2022)
- Invictus Victory Elixir (2023)

XS was launched in 1994; its line extension include:

- Black XS (2005)
- Pure XS (2017)

Other fragrances include:

- Paco Rabanne Pour Homme (1973)
- Ultraviolet (1999)
- Phantom (2021)
