= Daniela Andrier =

German perfumer

Daniela Roche Andrier (born 1964) is a German perfumer.

== Biography ==
Born in Heidelberg, Daniela Roche Andrier studied philosophy at the Sorbonne before turning to a career in the perfume industry.

She studied at Roure after training at Chanel and has created scents for Bottega Veneta, Bulgari, Etat libre d'Orange, Giorgio Armani, Guerlain, Kenzo, Maison Martin Margiela, Miu Miu, Prada, Valentino, and Yves Saint Laurent. She currently works as perfumer for Givaudan.

She is married to Gilles Andrier, the CEO of Givaudan. They have four children.

== Creations ==
- Bottega Veneta Knot (2014)
- Calvin Klein Contradiction (1997) with Antoine Lie
- Etat libre d'Orange Une Amourette Roland Mouret (2017)
- Gucci Envy for men (1998)
- Maison Martin Margiela Untitled (2010)
- Marni -Marni (2013)
- Miu Miu Miu Miu (2015)
- Prada Candy (2011)
- Tiffany Eau de Parfum (2017)
- Prada Les Infusions (2007)
