= Rochas =

French fashion house and luxury brand

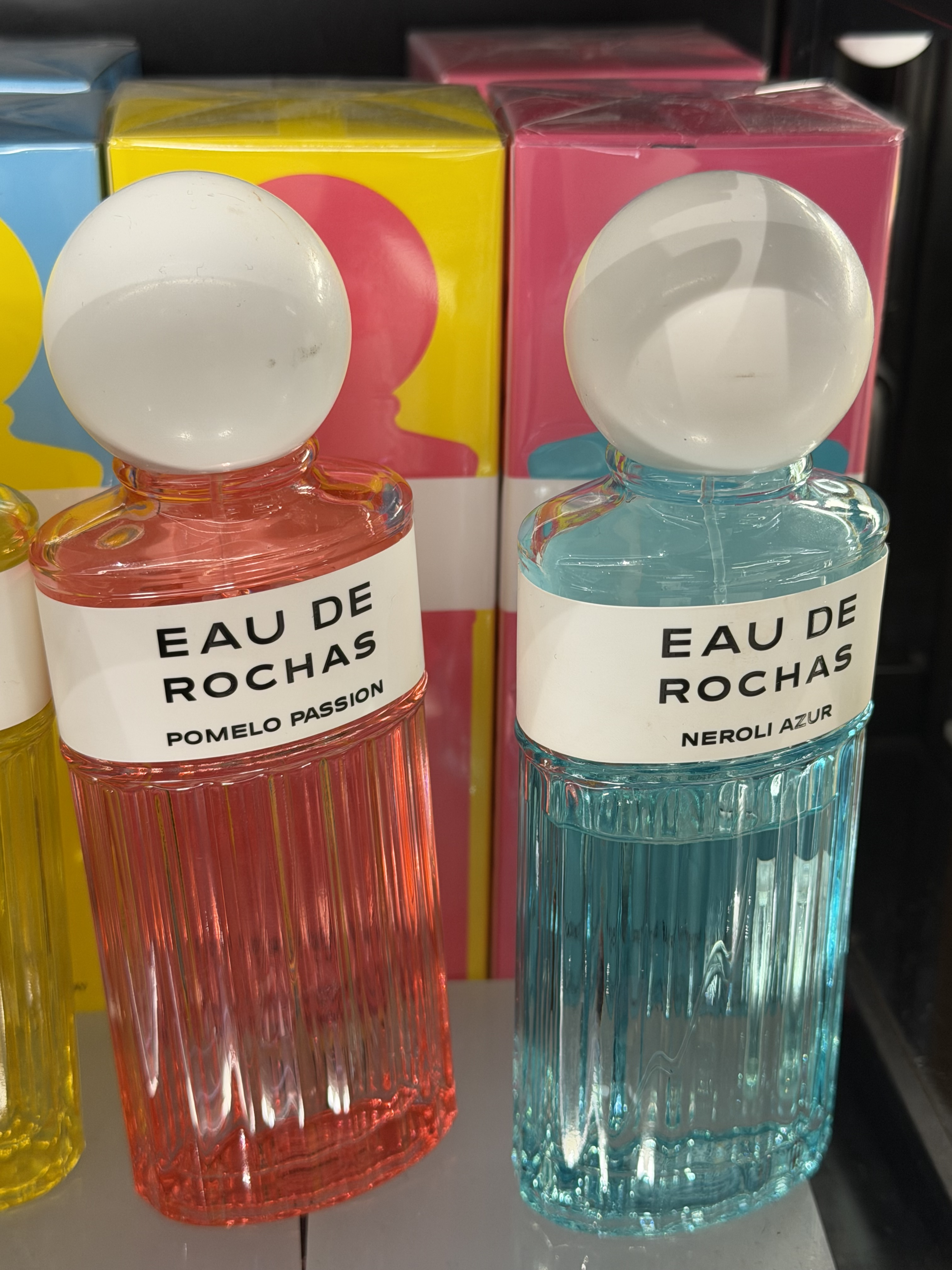
- Type: Private
- Industry: Fashion
- Founded: 1925; 101 years ago
- Founder: Marcel Rochas
- Key people: Alessandro Vigilante (creative director)
- Website: https://www.rochas.com/

Rochas is a fashion, beauty, and perfume house founded in 1925 by French fashion designer Marcel Rochas, the first designer of 2/3-length coats and skirts with pockets and one of the two designers, along with Elsa Schiaparelli, who launched the fashion for padded shoulders in 1931. Rochas had been known primarily for its signature perfume, Femme, which was packaged in a pink box with black lace.

== History ==
=== Early beginnings ===
Rochas had existed only as a fragrance from the time that Marcel Rochas died in 1955 until Wella, which made its classic Femme scent, brought back a clothing line in 1990 with the designer Peter O'Brien.

=== Olivier Theyskens, 2002–2008 ===
The company found new recognition for its fashion design when it chose Belgian-born Olivier Theyskens as its creative director in 2002. (In the years leading to his appointment, its clothes had not been considered notable.) Theyskens, within his first few months, was credited as creating an "entirely new silhouette for the house" that was French-influenced and elegant. His first full collection, for Fall 2003, was praised by style.com as "ravishing" and "nothing short of magnificent."

For the next several years, Rochas continued to garner praise among fashion critics and to attract loyal followers. Rochas' clients included Nicole Kidman, Jennifer Aniston, Kirsten Dunst, Kate Bosworth, Jennifer Lopez, Rachel Weisz, and Sarah Jessica Parker. In 2006, the Council of Fashion Designers of America awarded Theyskens the International Award. However, Theyskens' focus on "demicouture" (special pieces too costly to mass-produce but which may not meet strict couture rules regarding hand-stitching and numbers of fitting) was questioned by fashion insiders as a viable business strategy. His gowns, some of which were priced upwards of $20,000, were often out of reach for all but the most fabulously wealthy. Theyskens took a purer approach to fashion and did not rely (like many fashion houses) on accessory sales and cheaper sister lines for a steady stream of revenue.

In July 2006, Procter & Gamble announced the discontinuation of Rochas' fashion division, shocking many in the fashion industry. One "longtime designer," commenting anonymously in The New York Times, said of the closure, "That sort of perfect, made-to-measure business can't exist today, which is really too bad. Everything is about business now, and fashion shouldn't have to follow normal economic models—that's not the point. What happened to investing in beauty?"

News emerged in 2008 that there were plans to reopen the fashion house.

=== Marco Zanini, 2008–2013 ===
On November 3, 2008, Marco Zanini was named new artistic director for the fashion house, in partnership with the Italian company GIBO. He showed his first collection during Paris Fashion Week in February 2009. His ambition to build "brick by brick" and season after season the foundations of a renewed House of Rochas, his insistence on making each new collection "unpredictable", confirm the renaissance of Rochas in fashion.

In September 2013, it was confirmed that Zanini would be leaving Rochas after five years with the brand to take on the role of Creative Director at the House of Schiaparelli.

=== Alessandro Dell'Acqua, 2014–2020 ===
From 2014 to 2020, Alessandro Dell'Acqua served as women’s wear creative director at Rochas. Dell'Acqua's first show for Rochas was set to take place in February 2014.

In 2015, Interparfums announced it would buy Rochas from Procter & Gamble for $108 million.

In 2017 Rochas unveiled its first menswear collection, created by French designer Béatrice Ferran.

=== Charles de Vilmorin, 2021-2023 ===
Charles de Vilmorin was appointed as new creative director in 2021 only two weeks after he debuted his eponymous brand.

=== Alessandro Vigilante, 2024-Present ===
In December 2023, Rochas announced the appointment of Alessandro Vigilante to the creative director position. Vigilante has previously worked for brands such as Dolce & Gabbana and Gucci, and was hired by Rochas in May 2023 as a design employee. He will continue to design and produce a line under his own name during his time as creative director of Rochas.
