= Olivier Cresp =

French perfumer

- Born: 1955 (age 70–71); Grasse, France
- Occupation: perfumer

Olivier Cresp (born 1955) is a French perfumer.

Olivier Cresp was born in Grasse, France in 1955. His sister is fellow perfumer Françoise Caron. His father and grandfather both traded in the raw materials used in making perfume.

Cresp has been a perfumer since 1975. He started working for Firmenich in 1992, and became a Master Perfumer in 2006.

He lives in Paris, and his son Sebastien is also a perfumer.
