= Orange blossom =

Flower of the orange tree

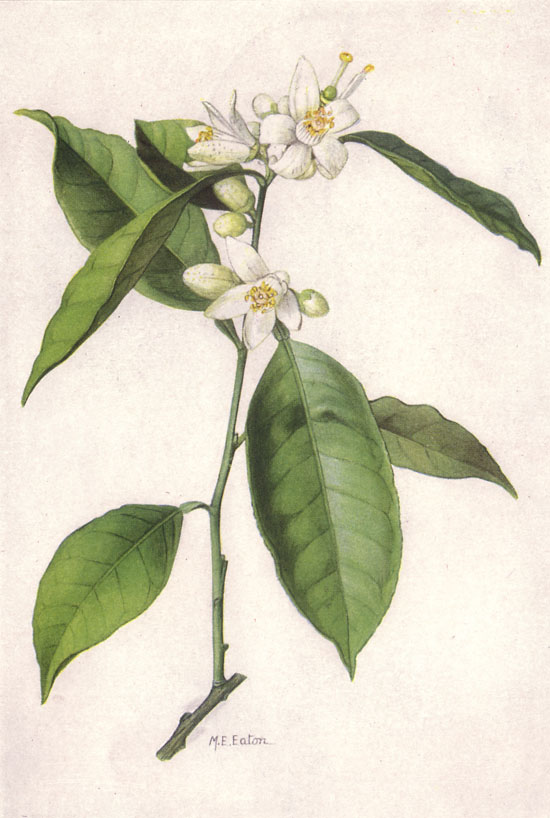
Citrus sinensis Osbeck painting by Mary Emily Eaton from a 1917 issue of National Geographic

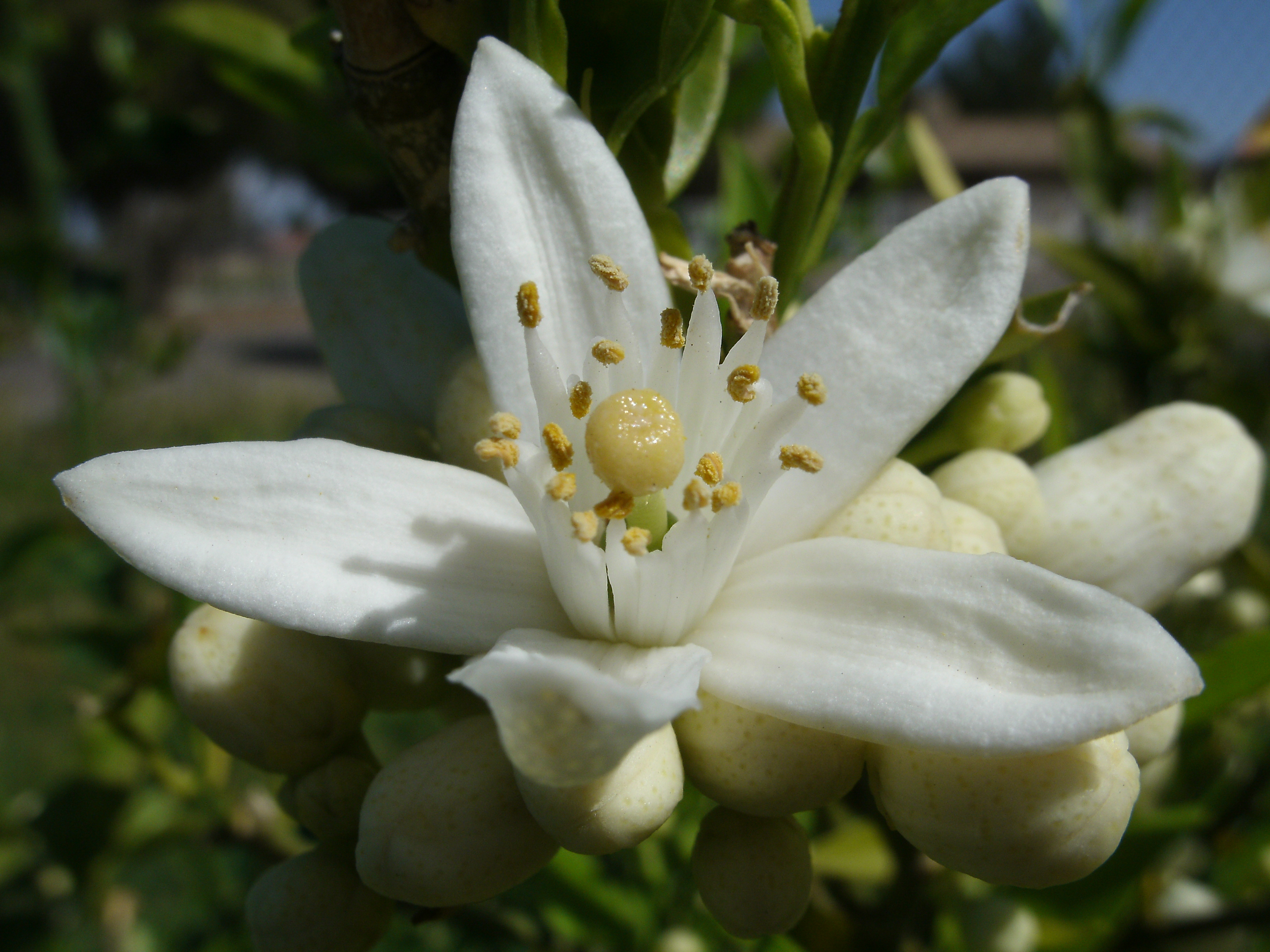
The orange blossom

The orange blossom is the fragrant flower of the Citrus sinensis (orange tree). It is used in perfume making and has been written about as an aphrodisiac. Orange blossom essence is an important component in the making of perfume. The petals of orange blossom can also be made into orange flower water (as an alternative to rose water), a common part of both French cuisine and Middle Eastern cuisine (most often as an ingredient in desserts and baked goods). It's also present in Hispanic culinary traditions, with notable examples being Mexican pan de muerto and Spanish Roscón de Reyes.

In the United States, orange flower water is often used to make orange blossom scones. The orange blossom is the state flower of Florida.

In Spain, the orange blossom lends its name to the Costa del Azahar ("Orange Blossom Coast"), the Castellon seaboard. Fallen blossoms are dried and used to make tea.
