= Flanker (perfume) =

Derivative or offshoot of an existing perfume

In perfumery, a flanker refers to newly created perfume that shares some attributes of an already existing perfume. These attributes may be the name, packaging or notes of the existing fragrance.

== Examples ==
- Dior's 1985 fragrance Poison was followed by Tendre Poison (1994), Hypnotic Poison (1998), Pure Poison (2004), Midnight Poison (2007) and Poison Girl (2016).
- Issey Miyake's 1992 fragrance "L'eau d'Issey" was followed by "L'eau d'Issey Pour Homme" (1994) and "L'Eau d'Issey Florale" in 2011.
- The Jimmy Choo fragrance "Jimmy Choo" released in 2011 was supplemented by a flanker perfume "Exotic" released in 2013.
- Paco Rabanne's highly successful 2008 perfume for men "1 Million" was followed by a perfume for women "Lady Million" in 2010. Its packaging was very similar to the original fragrance.
- Boy Smells' 2025 fragrance Citrush was followed by Citrush Gold (2026).
