= Perfumer =

Expert on creating perfume compositions

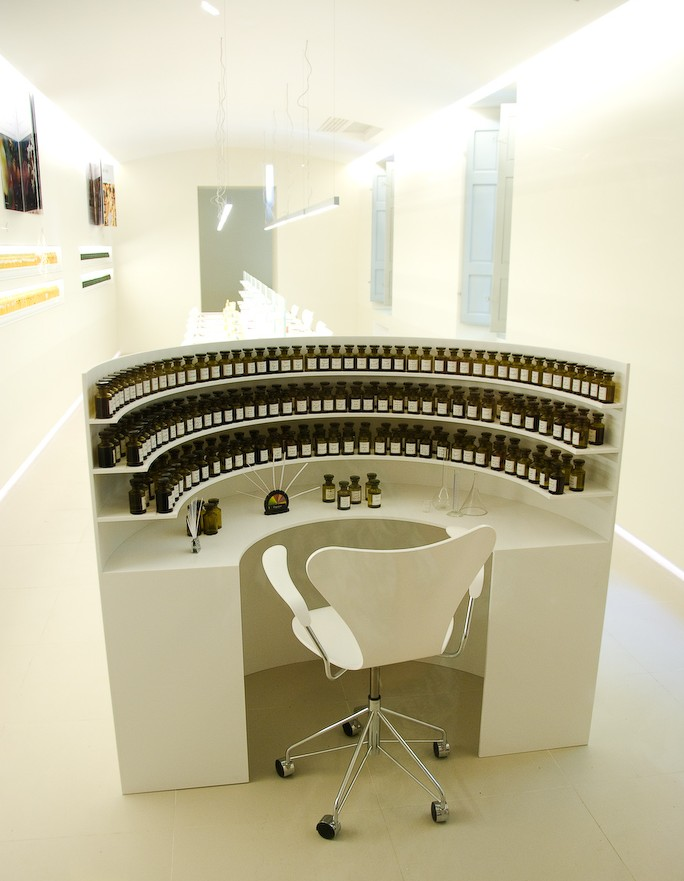
A mockup of a 'perfume organ' (lacks a weighing scale). The organ is traditionally where a perfumer works on the composition of various perfumes. However, samples are now weighed and blended by technicians in larger flavour and fragrance companies.

A perfumer is a professional that creates perfume compositions, sometimes referred to affectionately as a nose (French: nez) due to their fine sense of smell and skill in producing olfactory compositions. The perfumer is effectively an artist who is trained in depth on the concepts of fragrance aesthetics and who is capable of conveying abstract concepts and moods with compositions. At the most rudimentary level, a perfumer must have a keen knowledge of a large variety of fragrance ingredients and their smells, and be able to distinguish each one alone or in combination with others. They must also know how each reveals itself over time. The job of the perfumer is very similar to that of flavourists, who compose smells and flavourants for commercial food products.

== Training ==
Most past perfumers did not undergo professional training in the art, and many learned their craft as apprentices under another perfumer in their employment as technicians (in charge of blending formulas) or chemists. These people were usually given temporary jobs in the industry. A direct entrance into the profession is rare, and those who do typically enter it through family contacts. Such apprenticeships last around three years.

Until recently, professional schools open to the public did not exist. In 1970 ISIPCA became the first school in perfumery. Candidates must pass a demanding entrance examination, and must have taken university-level courses in organic chemistry.

Since 1998 PerfumersWorld's school has offered formal and informal training through university courses at King Mongkut's University of Technology Thonburi Biotechnology faculty, at Chulalongkorn University Pharmacy faculty and through online courses and private workshops in the United States, UK, Dubai, Hong Kong, Germany, New Zealand, and Thailand.

More recently, in 2002, another school was born, the Grasse Institute of Perfumery (G.I.P). Similarly here, candidates must have a foundation in chemistry or pharmacy to be accepted as students. Grasse itself is a world-renowned perfume centre.

Givaudan, International Flavors and Fragrances (IFF) and Symrise operate their own perfumery schools, but students must be employees and recommended by their managers. The University of Plymouth (UK) offers a BA (Bachelor of Arts) course in Business & Perfumery.

== Employment ==
Most perfumers are employed by large fragrance corporations including Mane, Robertet, Firmenich, IFF, Givaudan, Takasago, and Symrise. Some work exclusively for a perfume house or in their own companies, but these are not as common.

The perfumer typically begins a project with a brief by their employer or a customer, typically a fashion house or other large corporation. This will contain the specifications for the desired perfume, and will describe in often poetic or abstract terms what it should smell like or what feelings it should evoke, along with a maximum price per litre of the perfume oil concentrate. This allowance, along with the intended application of the perfume, will determine what aromatic ingredients will be used in the composition.

The perfumer will then go through the process of blending multiple mixtures and will attempt to capture the desired feelings specified in the brief. After presenting the perfume mixtures to the customers, the perfumer may "win" the brief with their approval. They proceed to work with the customer, often with the direction provided by a panel or artistic director, which guides and edits the modifications on the composition of the perfume. This process typically spans several months to several years, going through many iterations, and may involve cultural and public surveys to tailor a perfume to a particular market. The composition will then be either used to enhance another product as a functional fragrance (shampoos, make-up, detergents, car interiors, etc.) or marketed directly to the public as a fine fragrance.

Alternatively, the perfumer may simply be inspired to create a perfume and produce something that later becomes marketable or wins a brief. This is more common in smaller or independent perfume houses.

== Credits ==
For a long time, perfumes were associated with the brand name on the bottle. In 2000, Frédéric Malle was the first to include on the bottles of the perfumes he launched the names of the perfumers who composed them, and who were considered by his house as their authors. In the following decade, perfumers became an integral part of fragrance messaging and were increasingly placed in the spotlight.

== List of notable perfumers ==
- Henri Alméras
- Nicolas de Barry
- Ernest Beaux
- Calice Becker
- Francis Camail
- Jean Carles
- Jacques Cavallier
- Germaine Cellier
- Bernard Chant
- Sonia Constant
- François Coty
- François Demachy
- Bertrand Duchaufour
- Jean-Claude Ellena
- André Fraysse
- Olivia Giacobetti
- Adolph Goetting
- Sophia Grojsman
- Jacques Guerlain
- Jean-Paul Guerlain
- Jean Kerléo
- Karyn Khoury
- Francis Kurkdjian
- Christophe Laudamiel
- Norina Matchabelli
- Annick Ménardo
- David H. McConnell
- Alberto Morillas
- Patricia de Nicolaï
- Geneviève de Peyras
- Jacques Polge
- Henri Robert
- Dominique Ropion
- Maurice Roucel
- Christopher Sheldrake
- Olivier Cresp
- Thierry Wasser
- Edmond Roudnitska

== See also ==
- Aromachologist
- ISIPCA
- Université Européenne des Senteurs & Saveurs
