= Note (perfumery) =

Component of a fragrance

Fragrance pyramid.

Notes in perfumery are descriptors of scents that can be sensed upon the application of a perfume. Notes are separated into three classes: top/head notes, middle/heart notes, and base/soul notes; which denote groups of scents which can be sensed with respect to the time after the application of a perfume. These notes are created with knowledge of the evaporation process and intended use of the perfume. The presence of one note may alter the perception of another—for instance, the presence of certain base or heart notes will alter the scent perceived when the top notes are strongest, and likewise the scent of base notes in the dry-down will often be altered depending on the smells of the heart notes.

The idea of notes is used primarily for the marketing of fine fragrances. The term is sometimes used by perfumers to describe approximate scents or the perfumery process to laypeople.

The concept of a perfume pyramid first appeared in the 19th century. François Coty, creator of the legendary Chypre fragrance (1917), is considered one of the pioneers who popularized the concept.

== Volatility grouping ==
Fragrant materials are listed by Poucher in order of volatility and are grouped under respective evaporation coefficients (perfume notes) that range from 1 to 100.

Note	Evaporation coefficient
Top notes	1 to 14 (most volatile)
Middle notes	15 to 60
Base notes	61 to 100 (least volatile)

== Top notes ==
Top notes are otherwise called the head notes.

Perceived immediately upon application of a perfume, top notes consist of small, light molecules that evaporate quickly. They form a person's initial impression of a perfume and thus are very important in the selling of the product. The scents of this note class are usually described as "fresh", "assertive" or "sharp". The compounds that contribute to top notes are strong in scent, very volatile, and evaporate quickly.

Although not as saliently perceived, the heart and base-notes contribute much to the scent in the top notes.

Citrus and ginger scents are common top notes.

== Middle notes ==
Also called the "heart notes", the middle notes are the scent of a perfume that emerges just before the top notes dissipate. The middle note compounds form the "heart" or main body of a perfume and emerge in the middle of the perfume's dispersion process. They serve to mask the often unpleasant initial impression of base notes, which become more pleasant with time. The scent of middle note compounds is usually more mellow and "rounded". Scents from this note class disappear anywhere from twenty minutes to one hour after the application of a perfume.

Lavender and rose scents are typical middle notes.

== Base notes ==
Also called the "soul notes", base notes are the scent of a perfume that appears close to the departure of the middle notes. The base and middle notes together are the main theme of a perfume. Base notes bring depth and solidity to a perfume. Compounds of this class are often the fixatives used to hold and boost the strength of the lighter top and middle notes. Consisting of large, heavy molecules that evaporate slowly, compounds of this class of scents are typically rich and "deep" and are usually not perceived until 30 minutes after the application of the perfume or during the period of perfume dry-down.

Some base notes can still be detectable in excess of twenty-four hours after application, particularly the animalic and musk notes.

== See also ==
- Perfume § Fragrance notes
- Solid perfume
