= Jacques Guerlain =

French perfumer (1874–1963)

- Jacques Guerlain, 1956
- Born: 7 October 1874; Colombes, France
- Died: 2 May 1963 (aged 88); Paris, France
- Resting place: Passy Cemetery
- Education: University of Paris
- Known for: Perfumery
- Notable work: Après l'Ondée, 1906; L'Heure Bleue, 1912; Mitsouko, 1919; Shalimar, 1925; Vol de Nuit, 1933
- Spouse: Andrée "Lili" Bouffet (1884-1965)
- Awards: Chevalier of the Legion of Honour

Jacques Edouard Guerlain (French pronunciation: [ʒak ɡɛʁlɛ̃]; 7 October 1874 – 2 May 1963) was a French perfumer, the third and most famous of the Guerlain family. One of the most prolific and influential perfumers of the 20th century, over eighty of Guerlain's perfumes remain known, though certain estimates suggest he composed some four hundred. Among his greatest fragrances are L’Heure Bleue (1912), Mitsouko (1919) and Shalimar (1925). Though his work earned him universal renown, a considerable fortune and honours such as that of Chevalier of the Legion of Honour, Guerlain avoided public attention, never once granting an interview. As a result, relatively little is known of his creative process or personal life.

Many of his major works are archived in their original form at the Osmothèque, donated by Thierry Wasser on behalf of Guerlain in 2014.

== Biography ==
=== Early life ===
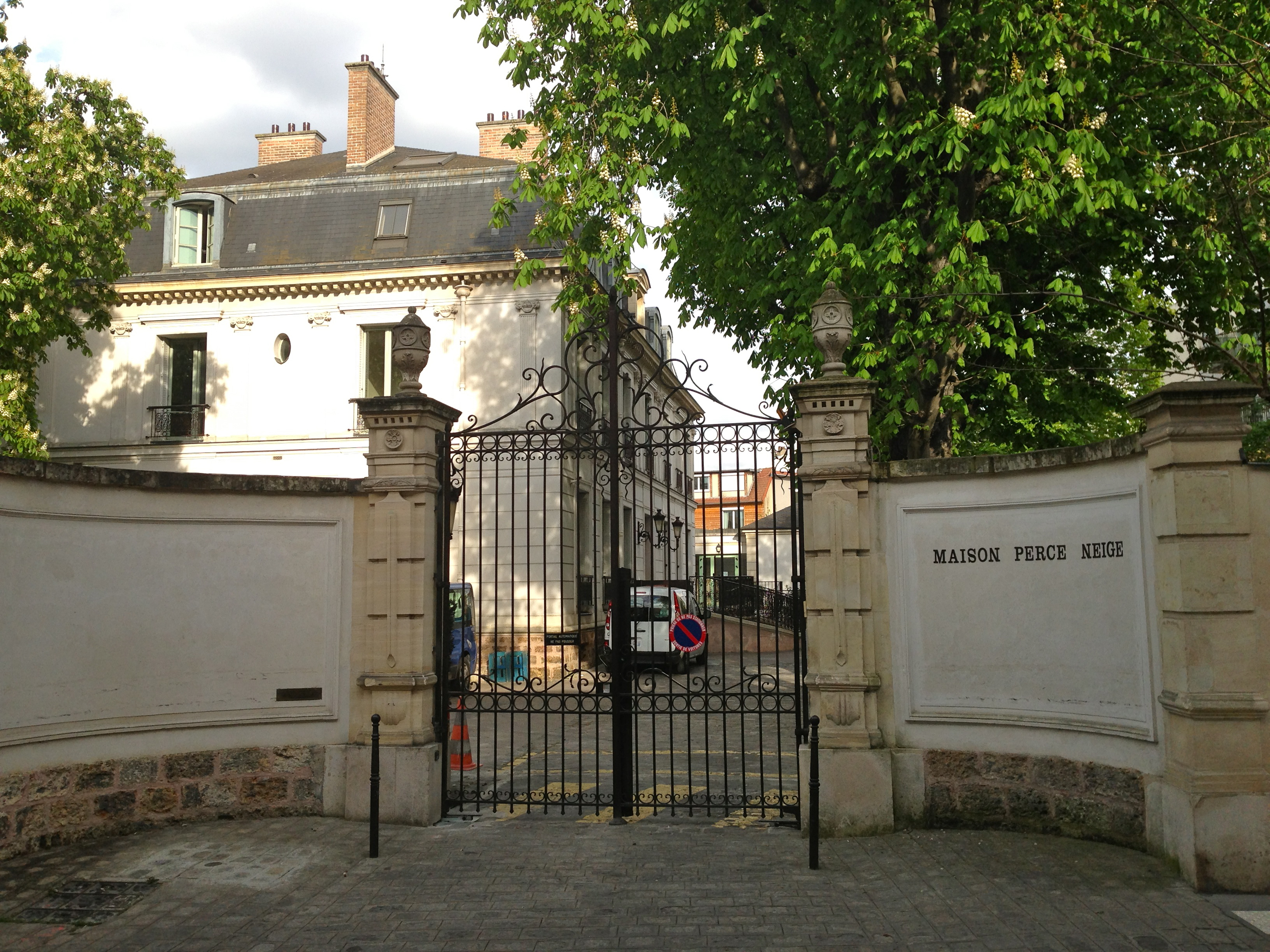
Former Guerlain villa, Colombes

Jacques Guerlain, the second child of Gabriel and Clarisse Guerlain, was born in 1874 in the family villa in Colombes. He was educated in England, in keeping with family tradition, and then in Paris at the École Monge where he studied history, English, German, Greek and Latin. His uncle, perfumer Aimé Guerlain, was childless, and thus trained Jacques from the age of sixteen as his apprentice and successor. In 1890 Jacques created his first perfume, Ambre. He then interned in the organic chemistry laboratory of Charles Friedel at the University of Paris, before being officially employed in the family business in 1894. He experimented widely in both cosmetics and fragrance, perfecting a method for perfuming ink while publishing with Justin Dupont on the subject of various essential oils. Meanwhile, he composed his earliest works such as Le Jardin de Mon Curé (1895). In 1897 he assumed joint ownership of his family's company, shared with his brother, Pierre, and father. For two years, Jacques and Pierre exchanged the responsibilities of manager and chief perfumer, until Jacques assumed the latter role in 1899. During this period, Jacques composed several perfumes, including Tsao Ko (1898), his first perfume to reference the Orient, a dominant theme in his oeuvre.

=== Belle Époque to World War I ===
At the Exposition Universelle in 1900, Jacques Guerlain presented the leathery floral Voilà Pourquoi J'Aimais Rosine in tribute to Sarah Bernhardt (born Rosine Bernardt), a friend of the Guerlain family. The grimly named Fleur Qui Meurt (1901) was a novel experiment with violet (created in perfumery via synthesis), a common accord in Guerlain's oeuvre. This was followed by a pair, Voilette de Madame (1904) and Mouchoir de Monsieur (1904), the latter being one of Guerlain's few masculines and largely akin to his uncle's Jicky (1889).

In 1905 Guerlain married Andrée Bouffet, a Protestant from Lille, and did so according to Protestant law, thereby suffering excommunication from the Catholic Church. Their first child, Jean-Jacques, was born the following year, as Guerlain finished Après l'Ondée (1906), his first major commercial success. This perfume, translated as "After the Rains" and described at its release as "melancholy" by La Liberté, was a continuation in Guerlain's experiments with notes of heliotrope and violet. Due to affordable synthetics, this accord was popular in mainstream perfumery, though Guerlain's treatment, incorporating anisic aldehyde, eugenol and large quantities of orris root, was considered exemplary by many, including perfumer Ernest Beaux.

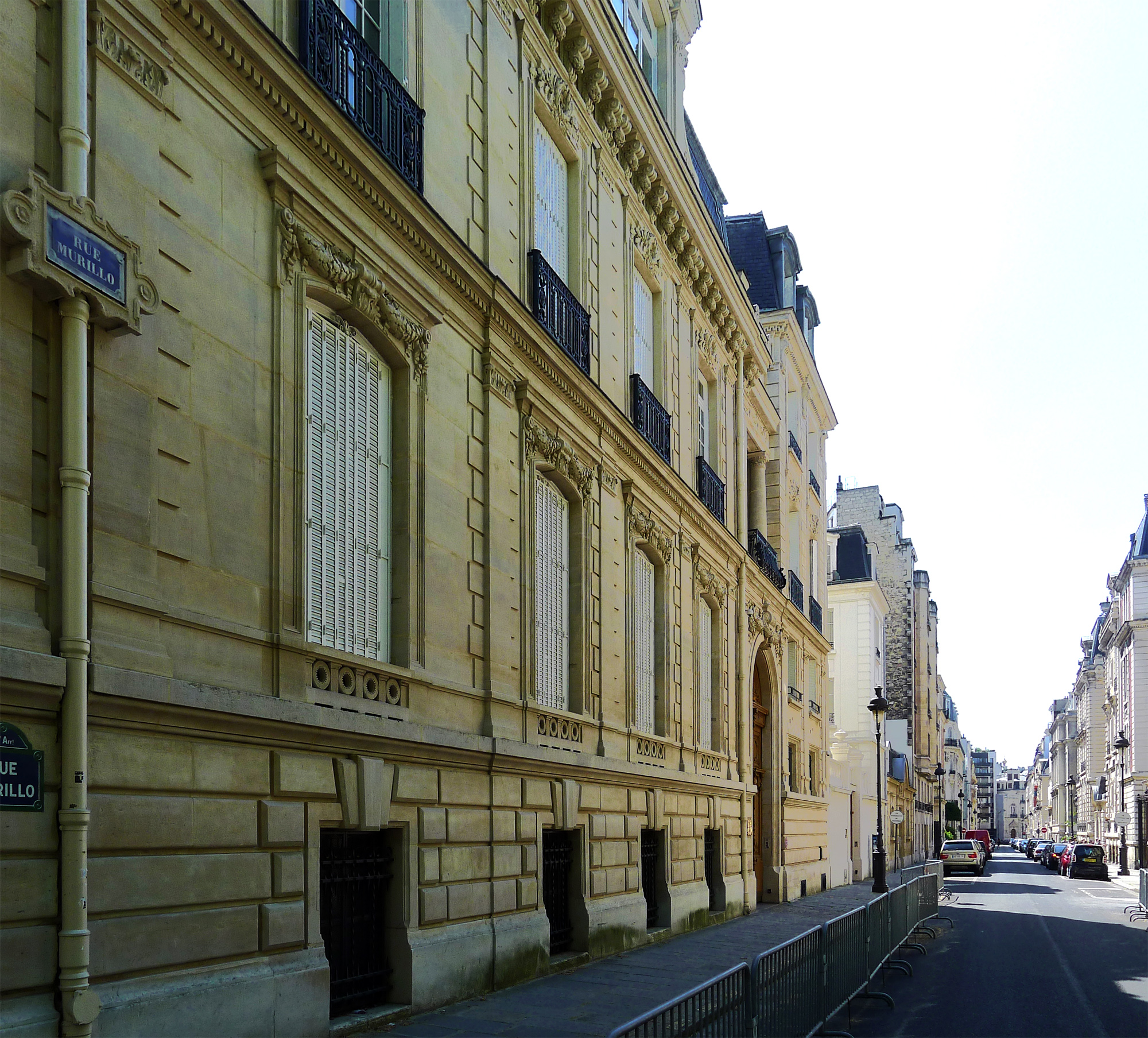
The Rue Murillo, Paris

Kadine, released in 1911, referenced a concubine in a sultan's harem, another Oriental subject. Though Guerlain never visited Asia, his fascination with the East led him to collect Oriental art; celadon and Blanc de Chine china featured in his ever-expanding collection decorating his apartment by the Parc Monceau at 22 Rue Murillo. An aesthete of diverse tastes, Guerlain purchased Nevers faience, and from Rouen manufactories alongside furniture by André Charles Boulle and Bernard II van Risamburgh (since acquired by the Louvre), paintings by Francisco Goya, Édouard Manet and Claude Monet (including The Magpie) and antique books.

Guerlain's passion for Impressionism and its distinctive effets de soir are thought to have influenced L’Heure Bleue (1912), meaning "The Blue Hour". An apt metaphor for Paris at the end of the Belle Époque and the beginning of World War I, Guerlain's grandson and successor Jean-Paul Guerlain explains it thus:

"Jacques Guerlain once said that he had a premonition of the calamity that was about to happen. ‘I couldn’t put it in words,’ he told me. ‘I felt something so intense, I could only express it in a perfume.'"

On the eve of the outbreak of World War I, Guerlain released Le Parfum des Champs-Elysées (1914), a chocolaty floral, to inaugurate the boutique at 68 Avenue des Champs-Élysées. It was sold in a turtle-shaped bottle allegedly referencing the boutique's tortoiselike architect, Charles Mewès.

Jacques Guerlain was soon after mobilized. By then, he was forty-one and the father of three children. While serving he sustained an injury to the head, leaving him blind in one eye, and so returned home. Unable to drive, his wife drove for him. Unable to ride, he abandoned the hunt, instead watching horses from his box at the racetrack. His weekends were spent with his family and dogs on his parents’ estate, the Vallée Coterel, a Norman Revival-style compound in Les Mesnuls. There in 1916 his mother, Clarisse, died at the age of 68. Guerlain released one perfume during the war, Jasmiralda, a woody jasmine referencing the heroine of Marius Petipa's La Esmeralda.

=== Interwar period: Exoticism ===
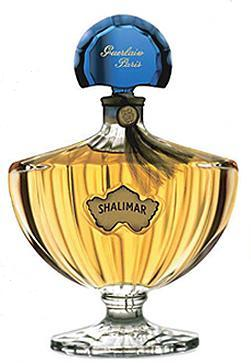
Shalimar (1925)

Jacques Guerlain's Mitsouko, released in 1919, was the result of several hundred trials with oakmoss and the peach-smelling gamma-undecalactone. Named after the heroine of Claude Farrère’s novel La Bataille (1909), the perfume conveys Guerlain’s considerable Japanophilia, inspired by accounts such as Farrère’s of Japanese supremacy during the Russo-Japanese War.

"My grandfather would often tell me the story of how the might of Russia had collapsed," Jean-Paul Guerlain recalled. "To everyone’s surprise, the Japanese crushed – they didn’t just defeat, they crushed – the Russian fleet. The Japanese navy had been created by the British, and most of my compatriots saw Japan as the new Great Britain."

Mitsouko, an imposing chypre, has also been interpreted as representing the new post-war woman, contrasted against her pre-war past as rendered in L’Heure Bleue, an essentially soft, ambery floral.

In 1925 Jacques Guerlain presented his magnum opus, Shalimar, at the International Exposition of Modern Industrial and Decorative Arts, of which Pierre Guerlain was vice president. The perfume paid tribute to the eponymous Mughal gardens and was the culmination of four years’ work. Guerlain was fifty years old. Shalimar would become the archetypal ‘oriental’ of perfumery, remaining the house's bestseller well into the 21st century. In the words of perfumer Bernard Bourgeois, "Who does not know the troubling sillage of Shalimar?"

Guerlain continued to push boundaries, the following year releasing Djédi (1926), referencing the magician of the Westcar Papyrus, a stylistic anomaly in Guerlain's oeuvre in that it is unusually severe. Liú (1929), named after the Tartar slave girl of Puccini’s opera Turandot, reflected Guerlain's admiration for the composer, and was his first aldehydic floral. In 1932 Guerlain became a member of the audit committee of the Bank of France and would remain with the bank as either a member or advisor for the next twenty years.

In 1933 Guerlain created Vol de Nuit, a work of a rather sombre maturity. The perfume took its name from the novel Night Flight (Vol de nuit in French language) (1931) by Antoine de Saint-Exupéry (a personal friend of Guerlain's), based upon the author's experience at the Aeroposta Argentina. That year, Jacques Guerlain's father, Gabriel, by whose side he had long worked, died at the age of 92 in Les Mesnuls. Guerlain inherited the country estate and his father's stud, the Haras de la Reboursière et de Montaigu in Nonant-le-Pin.

In the years following appeared Sous le Vent (1934), referencing the Leeward Islands and created for Josephine Baker, followed by Coque d’Or (1937), inspired by Diaghilev’s staging of Rimsky-Korsakov’s The Golden Cockerel, set in the Caucasus.

=== World War II and final years ===
Jacques Guerlain with his son, Claude, at the races

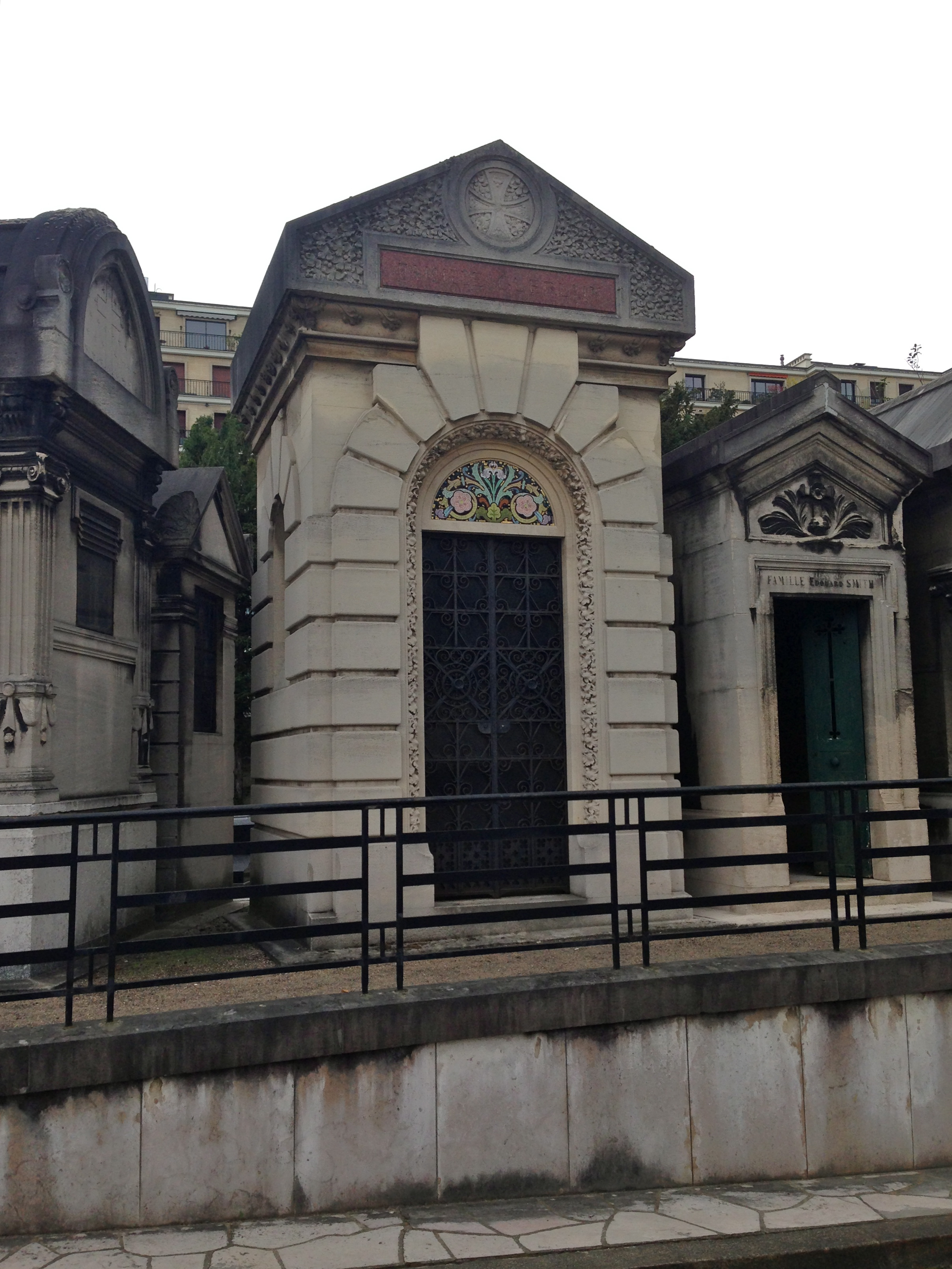
Guerlain mausoleum, Passy Cemetery

At the outbreak of World War II, Jacques Guerlain’s youngest son, Pierre, then 21 years old, was mobilized and fatally wounded in Baron along the River Oise. Guerlain was devastated and ceased creating for two years, also abandoning his stud in Normandy. At his estate in Les Mesnuls, he cultivated fruits and vegetables that he sent to his factory workers. In 1942 Guerlain returned with the perfume Kriss, named after an Indonesian dagger. The company’s factory in Bécon-les-Bruyères was destroyed by bombing the following year. Then, as the war drew to a close, Guerlain’s situation worsened when rumours spread of his apparent collaboration, all essentially unfounded. Guerlain fell into a deep depression. He re-released Kriss in 1945, renamed Dawamesk after a preparation of hashish.

He continued to work during the last eighteen years of his life, though created little. Increasingly he retreated to his estate in Les Mesnuls, attending to his flowerbeds, orchards and Japanese garden. His final creations include Fleur de Feu (1948), a cool aldehydic, and, four years later, the unusually coarse Atuana (a variant spelling of Atuona), named after the last resting place of painter Paul Gauguin. Ode (1955), Guerlain’s swan song created with his grandson and successor Jean-Paul Guerlain, is a conventional floral in tribute to his gardens, though it bears a resemblance to Henri Alméras’ Joy (1930).

In 1956 Guerlain reluctantly agreed to be photographed in his laboratory and country home by Willy Ronis for a special in Air France Revue. These photographs, taken at the end of Guerlain's career, offer a rare insight into his professional and personal life.

It was when working with his grandson on Chant d'Arômes, released in 1962, that Jacques Guerlain found himself incapacitated. "Unfortunately," he told his successor, "I create nothing more than perfumes for old ladies."

Weakened by a fall that fractured his femur, Jacques Guerlain died in Paris on 2 May 1963 at the age of 88. Though he was not a practising Catholic, his funeral was held at the Church of Saint-Philippe-du-Roule two days later. He was buried alongside his son, Pierre, and father in the Passy Cemetery.

== Influences ==
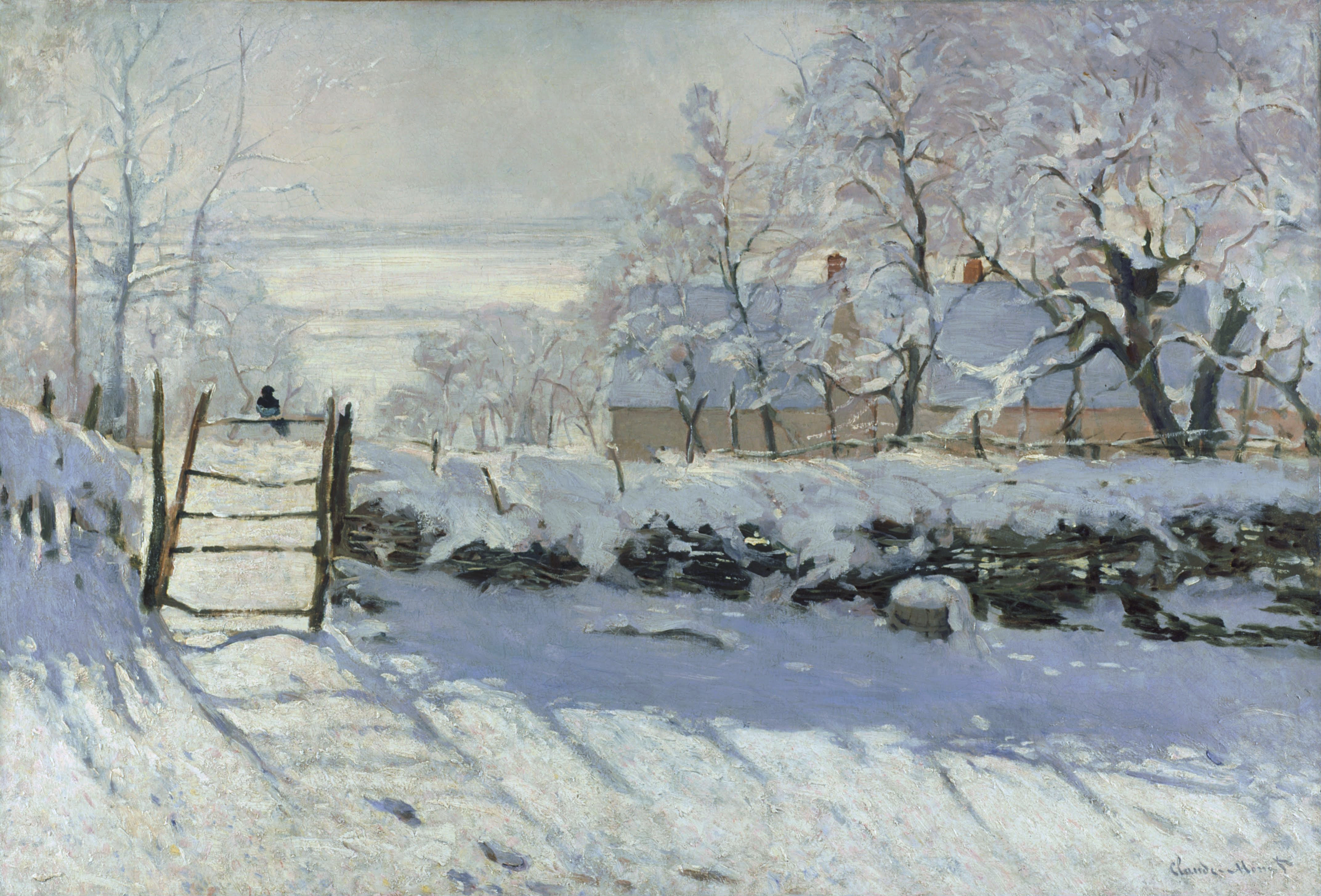
The Magpie by Claude Monet, acquired by Jacques Guerlain

"Part of the presiding genius of Guerlain," wrote critic Luca Turin, "even when at [his] least inventive, has always been to reinterpret the fashionable and do it slightly better. Jacques Guerlain famously followed up every one of François Coty’s great inventions with another in his own manner."

Specifically, Coty's L’Origan (1905) is often cited as the basis for Guerlain's L’Heure Bleue (1912), Chypre (1917) for Mitsouko (1919) and Émeraude (1921) for Shalimar (1925); Guerlain likely admired Coty (his exact contemporary), especially for his use of novel absolutes, synthetics and bases. Elsewhere, Ode (1955) bears a resemblance to Henri Alméras’ Joy (1930), and Liú (1929) to Ernest Beaux’s Chanel No. 5 (1921). Guerlain and Beaux respected one another mutually; referencing Shalimar, Beaux confided to his apprentice, Omer Arif:

"With the ton of vanillin there is in there, we could have barely made a sorbet. Guerlain, he, made a marvel!"

Guerlain greatly admired Paul Parquet, whose influence at the time of Guerlain's debut was ubiquitous. Guerlain’s son, Jean-Jacques Guerlain, wrote:

"There was also Mr. Parquet, creator of Le Parfum Idéal and proprietor of the house of Houbigant in my parents’ youth, whom they respected greatly."

As to further influences, Guerlain was an avid devotee of the arts, lending his patronage to the Society of the Friends of the Louvre. He admired many artists whose work he collected: Antoine-Louis Barye, Jean-Baptiste-Camille Corot, Henri Fantin-Latour, Jean-Honoré Fragonard, Thomas Gainsborough, Francisco Goya, Édouard Manet, Claude Monet, Hubert Robert, Alfred Sisley, David Teniers the Younger and Édouard Vuillard, among others. Paul Gauguin is referenced in his work, as are authors Claude Farrère and Antoine de Saint-Exupéry, composers Giacomo Puccini and Nikolai Rimsky-Korsakov and various celebrities including Josephine Baker, Sarah Bernhardt, Sergei Diaghilev and Marius Petipa. He was a devoted reader of crime fiction, though this is not reflected in the naming of his perfumes.

Reclusive by nature, Guerlain maintained relations with few of his confreres. Contrary to many of his contemporaries, such as Beaux and Vincent Roubert, Guerlain was "the opposite of a socialite", to quote Jean-Jacques Guerlain. He did, however, enjoy a friendship with perfumer Jacques Rouché, a neighbor with whom Guerlain shared a passion for the performing arts. Together they contributed to a lobby group protecting the interests of the fragrance industry, holding meetings at Guerlain’s offices on the Champs Élysées.

== Palette and creative process ==
Described as a "virtual pastry chef" by critic Luca Turin, Guerlain favoured a rich, sweetish palette developed from that of his uncle and predecessor, Aimé Guerlain, building upon the latter’s ambery, herbal signature accord, termed 'Guerlinade'. Turin continues:

"[A] Guerlain never starts with a blank sheet of paper, but with a blurred filigree of everything they ever built. Then they stretch it this way and that, removing old and adding new features as taste evolves, before bringing it all into soft focus."

Certain materials are ubiquitous in Guerlain’s work: high quality citruses (bergamot, citron, mandarin, sweet and bitter orange), coumarin, floral absolutes (cassie, jasmine, rose, orange blossom), green notes (galbanum), violet-smelling ionones and fine qualities of orris, vanilla and ylang-ylang. He had a fondness for aromatic spices (cardamom, cinnamon, cloves, croton, nutmeg) and certain herbes de Provence (absinthe, angelica, basil, bay leaf, caraway, coriander, cumin, tarragon). He was a specialist on aromatic resins (benzoin, labdanum); indeed he used opoponax in most of his formulae, sometimes in mere trace quantities - imperceptible in and of itself though lending to the overall texture of the perfume. His base notes often consisted of strong artificial musks (musk ketone, musk ambrette, musk xylene), which he favored greatly. As to ambergris, according to a supplier, Guerlain would say, "You sell this product at a shameful price; it smells of almost nothing, but my clients stop liking my perfumes when I put none in."

Like François Coty and Ernest Daltroff, Guerlain frequently incorporated bases produced by M. Naef and the Fabriques de Laire, especially the latter's Mousse de Saxe to create a distinctive leather accord. He was also a friend of Louis Amic and Justin Dupont, both at Roure-Bertrand with whom he signed an exclusivity agreement for certain novel molecules used in Shalimar. Guerlain’s technique of balancing synthetics with rich naturals is considered exemplary; in the words of perfumer Ernest Shiftan, Guerlain’s work is "the greatest example of the blending of aroma chemicals with natural products."

As an independent perfumer, Guerlain enjoyed total creative freedom.

"Jacques Guerlain worked like a portrait painter at his easel," wrote Jean-Paul Guerlain, "and when the creation was finished, he chose a bottle – as a painter would choose a frame – and he put the new perfume on sale in the boutique without any further ado."

Guerlain worked in two laboratories, the first in Bécon-les-Bruyères and complete with gardens, destroyed by bombing in 1943, and the second in Courbevoie, built in 1947. There Guerlain created in private; only his assistant, who carried heavy loads, was permitted entry. Self-critical and perfectionistic, he worked slowly and intermittently on each perfume, perfecting several at once over the course of time. Through much of his career, he measured his ingredients according to volume, weighing only solid materials. When creating he smelled little, instead preferring to take home all manner of trials to be considered later. His perfumed smelling strips he would arrange atop the mantelpiece in the sitting room, noting their evolution throughout the day.

His creative process varied greatly according to the work in question; certain of his formulae are relatively short, including that of Mitsouko (1919) which lists a mere twelve materials. Others are more elaborate, sometimes incorporating previous perfumes (termed formules à tiroir); Cuir de Russie (1935) includes among its ingredients Chypre de Paris (1909) and Mitsouko. While generally methodical, Guerlain could sometimes prove impulsive; a popular rumour suggests that he emptied a sample of ethylvanillin, provided by Justin Dupont, into a flask of his uncle's Jicky (1889), thereby striking upon the initial concept for Shalimar.

Guerlain's faithful muse, it is said, was his wife, Andrée, affectionately nicknamed Lili.

"Remember one thing," Guerlain told his grandson, Jean-Paul Guerlain. "One always creates perfumes for the woman with whom one lives and whom one loves."

Guerlain spoke little of his work and creative process; indeed he was painfully taciturn. When pressed for words of wisdom, Guerlain was known to reply simply:

"Perfumery? It’s a matter of patience and time."

== Legacy ==
Pierre, Marcel, Jean-Jacques and Jacques Guerlain at the Vallée Coterel, Les Mesnuls, 1956.

"Jacques Guerlain emblematised taste, refinement, education, ambiance and a love of dogs and horses," wrote Guy Robert, former president of the French Society of Perfumers.

In contrast to François Coty, Ernest Daltroff or Paul Parquet, autodidactic perfumers who revolutionised early 20th century perfumery, Jacques Guerlain distinguished himself by his shrewd discernment and wary conventionalism, no doubt informed by the weight of family heritage. Marcel Billot, founding president of the French Society of Perfumers, aptly described Guerlain as "a genius who knew to be of his time while living nonetheless in keeping with tradition."

For a modern generation, several of Guerlain's perfumes have become models of their genre; Shalimar (1925), though not the first oriental, is generally cited as the archetype. Mitsouko (1919), according to perfumer Bertrand Duchaufour, is considered a reference chypre, somewhat inaccurately in that its inclusion of the peach-smelling gamma-undecalactone distinguishes it as a fruity chypre. This confusion is often due to the disappearance of the original model, in the latter's case Coty's Chypre (1917), discontinued in the 1960s.

Guerlain, though never much of a pioneer, was not without his innovations. Throughout the 1930s, his use of green notes, such as galbanum, was extremely novel for the period. In this sense, perfumes such as Vol de Nuit (1933) and Sous le Vent (1933) may be considered precursory of bolder works including Paul Vacher’s Miss Dior (1947).

Among the many perfumes composed by Guerlain, it is perhaps natural that some are easily mistakable; these are frequently subtle variations of the house's signature 'Guerlinade' rapidly devised for a specific event or celebrity. Yet Guerlain's best creations, often improvements upon the work of his contemporaries, are considered unmistakable, even from the model by which they were inspired, unique in their refinement, structure and diffusion.

René Bacharach describes a lesson learned when visiting the Guerlain factory as a young perfumer; upon presenting one of his best perfumes to Jean-Pierre Guerlain, the latter politely agreed to ask the opinion of his uncle, Jacques Guerlain:

"[Jean-Pierre Guerlain] returned moments later," Bacharach writes, "saying, 'I don’t know if I should repeat my uncle's words. I warned you he's severe.' I begged him to reveal an opinion that interested me greatly.

"I have never had the honour of meeting Jacques Guerlain in person, but he taught me that day, without knowing it, the best of lessons, when Jean-Pierre Guerlain added, 'My uncle said, "It doesn’t smell."'"

== Selected works ==
=== Perfumes ===
- Ambre (1890)
- Le Jardin de Mon Curé (1895)
- À Travers Champs (1898)
- Tsao Ko (1898)
- Dix Pétales de Rose (1899)
- Voilà Pourquoi J'Aimais Rosine (1900)*
- Fleur Qui Meurt (1901)*
- Bon Vieux Temps (1902)
- Mouchoir de Monsieur (1904)*
- Voilette de Madame (1904)*
- Aï Loë (1905)
- Après l'Ondée (1906)*
- Sillage (1907)*
- Muguet (1908)*
- Chypre de Paris (1909)
- Quand Vient l'Été (1910)
- Kadine (1911)
- Pour Troubler (1911)
- Fol Arôme (1912)
- L'Heure Bleue (1912)
- Vague Souvenir (1912)
- Mi-Mai (1914)
- Le Parfum des Champs-Elysées (1914)*
- Jasmiralda (1917)*
- Mitsouko (1919)*
- Eau de Fleurs de Cédrat (1920)
- Bouquet de Faunes (1922)*
- Candide Effluve (1922)*
- Guerlinade (1924)*
- Jasmin (1924)
- Shalimar (1925)*
- Djédi (1926)*
- Liú (1929)
- Vol de Nuit (1933)
- Sous le Vent (1934)*
- Cuir de Russie (1935)*
- Véga (1936)*
- Cachet Jaune (1937)*
- Coque d'Or (1937)*
- Kriss (1942)
- Fleur de Feu (1948)*
- Atuana (1952)*
- Chypre 53 (1953)
- Ode (1955)
- Chant d'Arômes (with Jean-Paul Guerlain, 1962)

(*) indicates inclusion in the archives of the Osmothèque

=== Scientific essays ===
- French Oil of Roses (with Justin Dupont) – Journal of the Chemical Society (1897)
- Oil of Basil (with Justin Dupont) – Journal of the Chemical Society (1898)

== See also ==
- Guerlain
- Aimé Guerlain
- Jean-Paul Guerlain
- Pierre-François-Pascal Guerlain
- Mitsouko (perfume)
- Osmothèque
- Perfume
- Perfumer
- Shalimar (perfume)
