= Mitsuko =

- Pronunciation: (Mee-tsoo-koh)
- Gender: Female

Origin
- Origin: Japanese
- Region of origin: Japan

Other names
- Related names: Mitsouko

Mitsuko is a feminine Japanese given name.

== Written forms ==
The name Mitsuko is generally written with the kanji characters 光 and 子 which, when translated into English can mean "light, child" or "shining, child". Mitsuko can have different meanings depending on which kanji characters are used to write the name. Some possible variations of the name Mitsuko are:

- 光子, "light, child"
- 充子, "provide, child"
- 満子, "satisfy/full, child"
- 睦子, "harmonious/intimate/friendly, child"
- 三子, "third child"
- 密子, "carefulness/secrecy, child"
- 蜜子, "honey/nectar/molasses, child"

== People with the name ==
- Mitsuko Alexandra Yabe (born 1991), known as Lightchild, American and Japanese musician, composer, and music editor
- Mitsuko Aoyama (青山 光子; 1874–1941), one of the first Japanese people to immigrate to Europe
- Mitsuko Baisho (倍賞 美津子; born 1946), Japanese actress
- Mitsuko Hamuro (葉室 光子; 1853–1873), Japanese concubine
- Mitsuko Horie (堀江 美都子; born 1957), Japanese actress, voice actress and singer
- Mitsuko Igarashi (五十嵐 充子; born 1977), Japanese ice hockey player
- Mitsuko Ishii (石井 苗子; born 1954), Japanese politician
- Mitsuko Kandori (香取 光子; born 1943), Japanese gymnast
- Mitsuko Kusabue (草笛 光子; born 1933), Japanese actress
- Mitsuko Mito (水戸 光子; 1919–1981), Japanese actress
- Mitsuko Miura (三浦 光子; 1917–1969), Japanese actress
- Mitsuko Mori (森 光子; 1920–2012), Japanese actress
- Mitsuko Satake (佐竹 美都子; born 1976), Japanese sailor
- Mitsuko Shiga (四賀 光子; 1885–1976), Japanese tanka poet
- Mitsuko Shirai (白井 光子; born 1947), Japanese mezzo-soprano and music professor
- Mitsuko Tabe (田部 光子; 1933–2024), Japanese multimedia artist
- Mitsuko Tokoro (所 美都子; 1939–1968), Japanese biologist and New Left activist
- Mitsuko Tomon (東門 美津子; born 1942), Japanese politician
- Mitsuko Torii (鳥居 充子; born 1943), Japanese high jumper
- Mitsuko Tottori (鳥取 三津子; born 1964), Japanese airline executive
- Mitsuko Uchida (内田 光子; born 1948), Japanese-English classical pianist and conductor
- Mitsuko Yamada (山田 三津子; 1948-2009), known as Murasaki Yamada, Japanese manga artist, feminist essayist and poet
- Mitsuko Yoshikawa (吉川 満子; 1901–1991), Japanese actress

== Fictional characters ==
- Mitsuko Komyoji, a central character in the Android Kikaider manga and anime series
- Mitsuko Souma, a central character in the Battle Royale novel, film, and manga
- Mitsuko the Boar, a character from the Bloody Roar video game series
- Mitsouko Yorisaka, a character in Claude Farrère's novel La Bataille, and the namesake of Guerlain's perfume "Mitsouko"
- Mitsuko Krieger, a character in Archer (2009 TV series), the holographic anime-style "wife" of Algernop Krieger.
- Mitsuko Hama, a character from the manga Sazae-san

== See also ==
- Mitzi
