= Grand Musée du Parfum =

Perfume museum in France

- Founders: Guillaume de Maussion
- Coordinates: 48°52′17″N 2°18′53″E

The Grand Musée du Parfum (French pronunciation: [ɡʁɑ̃ myze dy paʁfœ̃]) was a Paris perfumery museum that operated from December 22nd, 2016, to July 6th, 2018.

== History ==
The Grand Musée du Parfum opened on 22 December 2016. It was founded by entrepreneur Guillaume de Maussion whose ambition was to create a "scientific, creative and accessible" space. It was overseen by fragrance experts including Jean-Claude Ellena (in-house perfumer at Hermes), Mathilde Laurent (house perfumer at Cartier), and Sylvaine Delacourte (director of fragrance for Guerlain). The museum, developed over two years.

A 5-year partnership had been inked with the International Flavors & Fragrances, the museum had the support of Paris' Mayor Anne Hidalgo, of the Fédération des Entreprises de la Beauté and of the Syndicat Français de la Parfumerie.

The museum closed on 6 July 2018. No explanation was provided as to why it closed.

== Description ==
The Grand Musée du Parfum was located in the hôtel particulier at 73, rue du Faubourg Saint-Honoré. The 1,400 m^{2} building was fully renovated at a cost of 7 million euros. It was once the residence of the Roederer champagne family and later the location of fashion house Christian Lacroix.

Exhibits included a recreation of the laboratory of French perfume house Houbigant (founded in 1775 at 19, rue du Faubourg-Saint-Honoré), using items on loan from the Musée Carnavalet (the museum of the history of Paris). It also had a "garden of scent" with white sculptures that each released different scents.

Entry cost between 5 and 14.50 Euro.
