= Roja Dove =

British perfumer (born 1956)

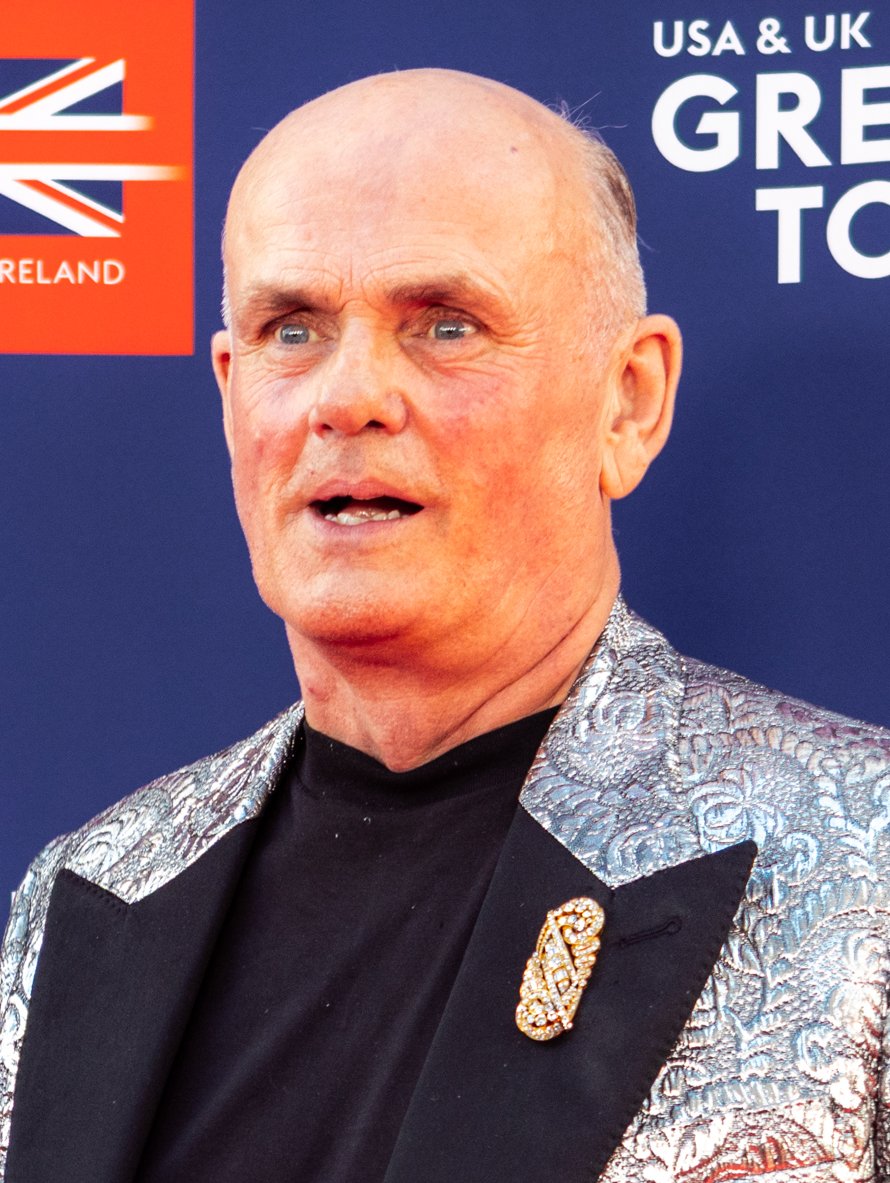
- Dove in 2026
- Born: Roger Bird; September 25, 1956 (age 70); Sussex, England
- Occupation: Perfumer
- Years active: 1981–present

Roja Dove (born Roger Dove, 25 September 1956) is a British perfumer whose fragrances are sold at department stores worldwide. Born and raised in Sussex, South East England, his career in perfumery began in 1981 when he joined the French perfume house Guerlain, working there for 20 years before leaving to set up his own companies RDPR and then Roja Parfums.

== Early life ==
Dove's interest in fragrance was sparked at an early age when his mother kissed him goodnight; as she lowered her head to kiss him, he was aware that her fragrance lingered in his room long after she had gone, keeping the image of her cocktail dress and the kiss alive. As a teenager he spent his money purchasing small bottles of scent and was impressed that the tiny containers could contain such an overwhelming effect.

Dove dropped out of university to work in perfumery with Guerlain.

== Time at Guerlain ==
In Dove's enthusiasm for learning more following his trip to the Guerlain boutique, he frequently wrote to classic French perfumers requesting information and experience. Eventually, pestered but impressed by Dove's interest, Robert Guerlain offered him a position. In 1981 Dove was recruited into the Training and Public Relations Department where he began to consolidate a professional understanding for the industry. Dove remained with Guerlain for nearly 20 years; after a number of years he was given the position of Global Ambassador, the first non-Guerlain family member to be given the role. He was dubbed "Professeur de Parfum".

== The Roja Dove Haute Parfumerie ==
In 2004 the Roja Dove Haute Parfumerie opened on the sixth floor of Harrods in conjunction with Urban Retreat. "Physically, it is going to be a sensual haven… Silks and satins, lots of glass, mirror and crystal, as well as the black lacquer, give the salon the air of an exotic boudoir".

Dove received requests from customers to smell 'Roja Dove' creations. Previously, in 2002, Dove joined names like Manolo Blahnik in donating prizes for the annual Terrence Higgins Trust fundraiser, the perfumer created a bespoke scent for the highest bidder contained within a Baccarat crystal presentation bottle. In 2005, Dove drew inspiration from this event and created a range of semi-bespoke fragrances for customers of the Haute Parfumerie to purchase; however these scents come without bottles, names, and with only enough liquid to make 50 of each.

== Other work ==
Dove has written for magazines including Vogue, The Times, Vanity Fair, and Wallpaper on subjects such as perfume, celebrity fragrances, classic favourites, and the "Smells of London".

Dove has given lectures and spoken at charity events for The Barbican, The Science Museum, and the Museum of Fine Arts, Boston. In 2010 Dove worked with the Victoria and Albert Museum on their exhibition Diaghilev and the Golden Age of the Ballets Russes, which ran from 25 September 2010 to 9 January 2011. He created an accompanying fragrance named 'Diaghilev' and gave a lecture on 1920s Parisian society and perfume.

In 2010 Dove collaborated with The Macallan Scottish whiskey house to create fragrances as a way of experiencing whiskey.

== See also ==
- Thierry Wasser
- Marie Urban Le Febvre
- Francis Kurkdjian
