= Shalimar (perfume) =

Guerlain perfume

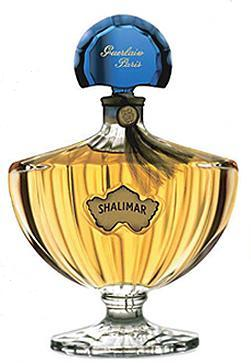

Fragrance by Guerlain
- Category: Oriental
- Designed for: Women
- Top notes: Bergamot
- Heart notes: Iris; Jasmine; Rose
- Base notes: Vanilla; Tonka Beans
- Released: 1925; 101 years ago
- Label: Guerlain
- Perfumer(s): Jacques Guerlain
- Concentration: Eau de Parfum
- Flanker(s): Shalimar Légère; Shalimar Eau Légère; Eau de Shalimar; Shalimar Ode à la Vanille; Shalimar Ode à la Vanille Sur la Route du Madagascar; Shalimar Ode à la Vanille Sur la Route du Mexique; Shalimar Parfum Initial; Shalimar Parfum Initial L'Eau; Shalimar Parfum Initial L'Eau Si Sensuelle; Shalimar Cologne; Shalimar Souffle de Parfum; Shalimar Souffle Intense; Shalimar Souffle de Lumière; Shalimar Souffle d'Oranger; Shalimar Philtre de Parfum; Shalimar Millésime Vanilla Planifolia; Shalimar Millésime Tonka; Shalimar Millésime Iris; Shalimar Millésime Jasmin

Shalimar is a perfume originally created by Jacques Guerlain in 1921 for French perfume and cosmetics house Guerlain. In production continuously since 1925, Shalimar is currently a flagship product for Guerlain.

== History ==
Shalimar was created by perfumer Jacques Guerlain in 1921, but after another company claimed to already have a fragrance by the same name, Guerlain was forced to rename the fragrance "No. 90" until a legal dispute over the name was settled. Shalimar was re-released in 1925 at the International Exhibition of Modern Decorative and Industrial Arts.

Jacques Guerlain was inspired by Mumtaz Mahal, the wife of Shah Jahan, Mughal emperor of India, and for whom the Taj Mahal in Agra and the Shalimar Gardens in Lahore were built. The harmony of Shalimar was created when Jacques Guerlain poured a bottle of ethylvanillin into a bottle of Jicky, a fragrance created by Guerlain in 1889.

Raymond Guerlain designed the bottle for Shalimar, which was modeled after the basins of eastern gardens and Mongolian stupa art. Shalimar's blue, fan-shaped bottle topper was inspired by a piece of silverware owned by the Guerlain family. The bottle was manufactured by Baccarat Crystal and received the Decorative Arts Exhibition Award in 1925.

During the 1920s, Shalimar was popular with flappers which helped give it a "bad girl" reputation.

In 1985, Shalimar was repackaged and presented encased in a Lucite box to commemorate the 60th anniversary of its original launch. In 2004, Guerlain issued Shalimar Light by perfumer Mathilde Laurent. However, Shalimar Light was taken off the market and replaced by Eau de Shalimar in 2008.

Shalimar is preserved in its original 1925 formulation in the archives of the Osmothèque, donated by Jean-Paul Guerlain. As of 2017, Shalimar was Guerlain's second best selling fragrance, behind La Petite Robe Noire, with approximately 108 bottles being sold every hour.

== Scent ==
The fragrance contains notes of bergamot, lemon, iris, jasmine, rose, patchouli, vetiver, opopanax, tonka bean, frankincense, sandalwood, musk, civet, ambergris, leather, and vanilla. It is considered to be an Oriental perfume (see Fragrance Wheel).

== Marketing ==
Illustrator Lyse Darcy created many illustrated ads for Guerlain products, including Shalimar, from the 1930s through the 1950s. Photographs taken by Helmut Newton were used in a print campaign for Shalimar in 1997.

In 2013, Guerlain produced an advertisement titled "The Legend of Shalimar," featuring Natalia Vodianova. The advertisement was directed by Bruno Aveillan and featured music by Hans Zimmer that had been originally composed for The Da Vinci Code.
