= Jicky =

Guerlain perfume

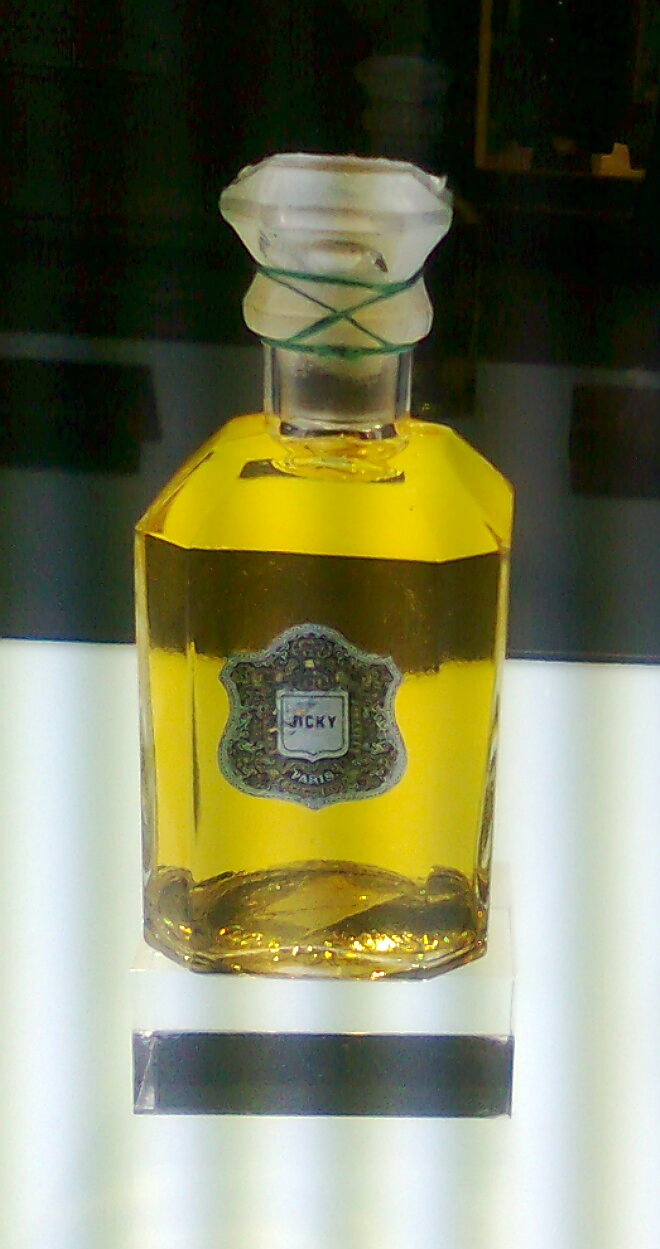

Fragrance by Guerlain
- Category: Amber (Oriental) Fougère
- Designed for: Unisex
- Top notes: Bergamot; Lavender
- Heart notes: Jasmine; Rose
- Base notes: Vanilla; Tonka Bean; Resins
- Released: 1889; 137 years ago
- Label: Guerlain
- Perfumer(s): Aimé Guerlain
- Concentration: Parfum, Eau de Parfum
- Website: Jicky

Jicky is a perfume originally created by Aimé Guerlain in 1889 for French perfume and cosmetics house Guerlain. Introduced in 1889, it is the oldest continuously produced perfume in the world.

== History ==
Jicky was one of the first perfumes created with the addition of synthetic materials, and was the first abstract perfume in history, meaning it is not based on a single note. Its perfume notes include: spice, lemon, lavender, wood and vanilla. Its stopper is shaped like a champagne cork.

Jicky was the nickname of Aimé Guerlain's nephew, Jacques Guerlain, and according to legend, was also the pet name of Aimé's girlfriend from his time studying in England.

Jicky was featured in the exhibition, The Art of Scent 1889–2012, curated by Chandler Burr at the Museum of Arts and Design, New York. This exhibition tracks the evolution and major innovations in scent design, since the dawn of the synthetic aroma compound in the late nineteenth century. Each of the scents in the exhibition is aligned to a historical art movements, with Jicky aligned with romanticism to reflect the emerging bourgeois French society.

== See also ==
- Mitsouko, created by perfumer Jacques Guerlain in 1919
- Shalimar, the flagship fragrance of perfume house Guerlain, created by Jacques Guerlain in 1921
