= Jean-Marie Saget =

French military pilot (1929–2020)

- Born: 17 March 1929; Paris, France
- Died: 20 March 2020 (aged 91)
- Occupations: Military pilot, test pilot
- Years active: 1949–1989

Jean-Marie Saget (17 March 1929 – 20 March 2020) was a French military pilot who later worked for Dassault Aviation as a test pilot from 1955 to 1989.

== Biography ==
Saget began flying in 1946, thanks to his father's Nord Aviation Nord 1300. In 1949, he graduated from the École de l'air. After an internship in the United States, Saget acquired a pilot's license, practicing with the Beechcraft T-6 Texan II and the North American P-51 Mustang. Shortly thereafter, he joined the French Air Force.

In addition to his military and professional career, Saget was an aerobatic instructor, with over 7000 hours of flight time on the Mudry CAP 10. He served as President of the Cercle de Chasse association in Nangis and the Aéro Club Marcel Dassault Voltige. In total, he accumulated more than 20,000 flight hours on 150 types of aircraft.

Saget died on 20 March 2020 at the age of 91. His daughter is French perfumer Anne-Marie Saget.

== Awards and decorations ==
- Officer of the Legion of Honour
- Commander of the Ordre national du Mérite
- Aeronautical Medal
- Prix Icare (1982), awarded by the Association des journalistes professionnels de l'aéronautique et de l'espace (AJPAE)
