= Anne-Marie Saget =

French perfumer

- Born: 14 September 1953 (age 72); Dijon, Côte-d’Or, France
- Occupation: Perfumer
- Years active: 1975-present

Anne-Marie Saget (born September 14, 1953) is a French perfumer. She is an influential creator and leading authority on aromatic raw materials of natural origin. She began her career at Guerlain, working alongside Jean-Paul Guerlain with whom she created classic perfumes including Nahema (1979), Derby (1985) and Samsara (1989). Her subsequent work at Mane SA and International Flavors & Fragrances (IFF) saw her specialize in the trade of natural materials. She later sourced rare perfumery, cosmetic and aroma-therapeutic ingredients from the Himalayas and Southeast Asia, assisting communities there to ensure fair trade, sustainable development and geographic protectionism.

== Biography ==
=== Early life and background ===
Anne-Marie Saget was born in Dijon. Her father was fighter pilot Jean-Marie Saget. As an adolescent, she became interested in perfumery but was soon discouraged; the industry was largely misogynistic and nepotistic, with little place for those born outside Grasse. She pursued engineering, studying nuclear physics and aeronautics at the École Polytechnique Féminine. In her final year, Saget wrote perfumer Jean-Paul Guerlain and secured an interview to discuss her project on the potential of artificial intelligence in perfumery composition. She presented several accords of her own creation, intriguing Guerlain, who had her undergo a perfumery test. Impressed by the results, Guerlain sent Saget to train in Geneva under perfumer Arturo Jordi-Pey, followed by an apprenticeship with naturals expert Monique Rémy at Camilli, Albert & Laloue in Grasse.

=== Guerlain ===
In 1975, Anne-Marie Saget joined Guerlain's perfumery laboratory in Chartres. Over the next four years, she and Jean-Paul Guerlain formed a close collaboration, creating together Nahema (1979). The perfume was an innovative accord of hyacinth, rose and balsams, incorporating an unusually large dose of rose oil and absolute, accompanied by novel synthetic notes like rose oxide. Though the fragrance proved a commercial disappointment, it was highly influential in the fragrance industry. Today, Nahema is considered among the greatest rose perfumes of modern perfumery.

Following Nahema’s release, Guerlain's financial losses led to a dramatic restructuring of the storied house. Perfumery development was thereafter governed by the marketing department, dramatically altering Guerlain and Saget's working method; they were forced to compete with outside perfumers on the creation of all future fragrances (they succeeded until Saget's departure in 1989). This contest was first enacted during the development of Jardins de Bagatelle (1983), originally intended to replace Eau de Guerlain (1974). Upon its release, Jardins de Bagatelle met with mixed reviews, its aldehydic, white floral structure seen as a departure from the aesthetic traditional to Guerlain. Today, Jardins de Bagatelle and Nahema are often cited as the Guerlain perfumes most characterized by Saget's composition style.

Two years later, Guerlain and Saget finished the masculine fragrance Derby (1985). Originally called Centurion, the composition developed from a leather note, combined with a fougère and dimetol accord resembling Paco Rabanne pour Homme (1973), requested by the marketing department. Marred by a confusing advertising campaign, Derby was also a commercial failure, but decades later earned praise from many critics. In 2008, Derby was rated among the ten best masculine fragrances of all time, according to Luca Turin and Tania Sanchez in Perfumes: The Guide.

After Derby, Guerlain determined to release a blockbuster fragrance to compete with Opium (1977), Giorgio (1981) and Poison (1985), the bestsellers of the period. Guerlain and Saget began modifying a white floral and sandalwood accord called Délicia, initially created by Guerlain for his muse Decia de Pauw. The perfumers settled on an unusually large dose of Mysore sandalwood oil, similar to their overdose of natural rose featured in Nahema a decade prior. They used the synthetic material Sandalore to extend the natural sandalwood's character into the perfume's top note. The resulting perfume was Samsara (1989).

During Samsara’s development, Saget traveled to the region of Jammu and Kashmir in northern India. Accepting an invitation from the prince of Zanskar, she attended in Padum a Kalachakra ceremony led by the Dalai Lama. There she became conscious of a desire to gain independence. Returning to Paris, she completed work on Samsara and resigned from Guerlain.

Samsara was the most prosperous result of Guerlain and Saget's collaboration; its success re-established Guerlain as one of the major French perfumery houses, leading to its acquisition by luxury group LVMH in 1994. In his 2019 book Perfume Legends II, perfumery historian Michael Edwards named both Nahema and Samsara among the greatest French feminine fragrances of modern perfumery.

=== Years in Asia ===
After leaving Guerlain in 1989, Anne-Marie Saget embarked on a yearlong journey through East and Southeast Asia, researching traditional perfumery, cosmetics and aroma-therapy in Hong Kong, Indonesia, Malaysia, Singapore, Taiwan and Thailand. Her findings formed the basis of her book A Perfume of the Far East, published in 1991. During this period, she also contributed articles to numerous perfumery and economic journals.

On the strength of her research, Saget was approached by Mane SA, a historic raw materials supplier in Grasse, and hired to establish and manage the company's Asian division in Singapore. There Saget was responsible for both perfumery and flavors, working for multinationals such as Johnson & Johnson and Unilever, as well as local companies like Malaysian tea manufacturer BOH Plantations and palm oil refinery Musim Mas. She also began collecting antique furniture from East Asia.

=== Return to France ===
Saget returned to France to establish a gallery specialized in antique furniture from the Third Burmese Empire and the Lan Na Kingdom. Her absence from perfumery was short-lived; she soon joined her former mentor, naturals specialist Monique Rémy, to expand the Laboratoire Monique Rémy (LMR), newly acquired by American giant International Flavors & Fragrances (IFF). At LMR, Saget promoted natural raw materials from around the world, proposing innovative uses for them, as well as novel links between perfumery and flavoring. She co-authored The Naturals Compendium (2009), a reference volume detailing the olfactory, botanical and chemical characteristics of over a hundred natural ingredients used in perfumery.

=== Work in Nepal and Thailand ===
After leaving the Laboratoire Monique Rémy, Saget spent several years exploring the Himalayas and Southeast Asia in search of rare natural products. She discovered in both regions a wealth of aromatic and therapeutic plants virtually unknown in Western perfumery and cosmetics, and local communities unable to exploit them sustainably. Thus in Nepal and Thailand, she sourced novel raw materials for large American and European fragrance and cosmetics companies, and negotiated agreements to ensure the materials’ sustainable development, fair trade and geographic protection. The initiatives of Saget and her Nepalese team led to the creation of The Plants of the Himalayas, a database on biodiversity and ethnobotany in the region, with a focus on olfactory, cosmetic and aroma-therapeutic applications.

Saget has lectured on her work in the Himalayas and Southeast Asia at universities in France and China.

== Notable works ==
=== Perfumes ===
- Nahema (Guerlain, 1979, with Jean-Paul Guerlain)
- Jardins de Bagatelle (Guerlain, 1983, with Jean-Paul Guerlain)
- Derby (Guerlain, 1985, with Jean-Paul Guerlain)
- Samsara (Guerlain, 1989, with Jean-Paul Guerlain)

=== Bibliography ===
- A Perfume of the Far East (Cosmétique News, 1991)
- The Naturals Compendium (LMR, 2009, co-author)

== See also ==
- Guerlain
- Jean-Marie Saget
- History of perfume
- Perfume
- Perfumer
