= Sous Le Vent =

Fragrance by Jacques Guerlain

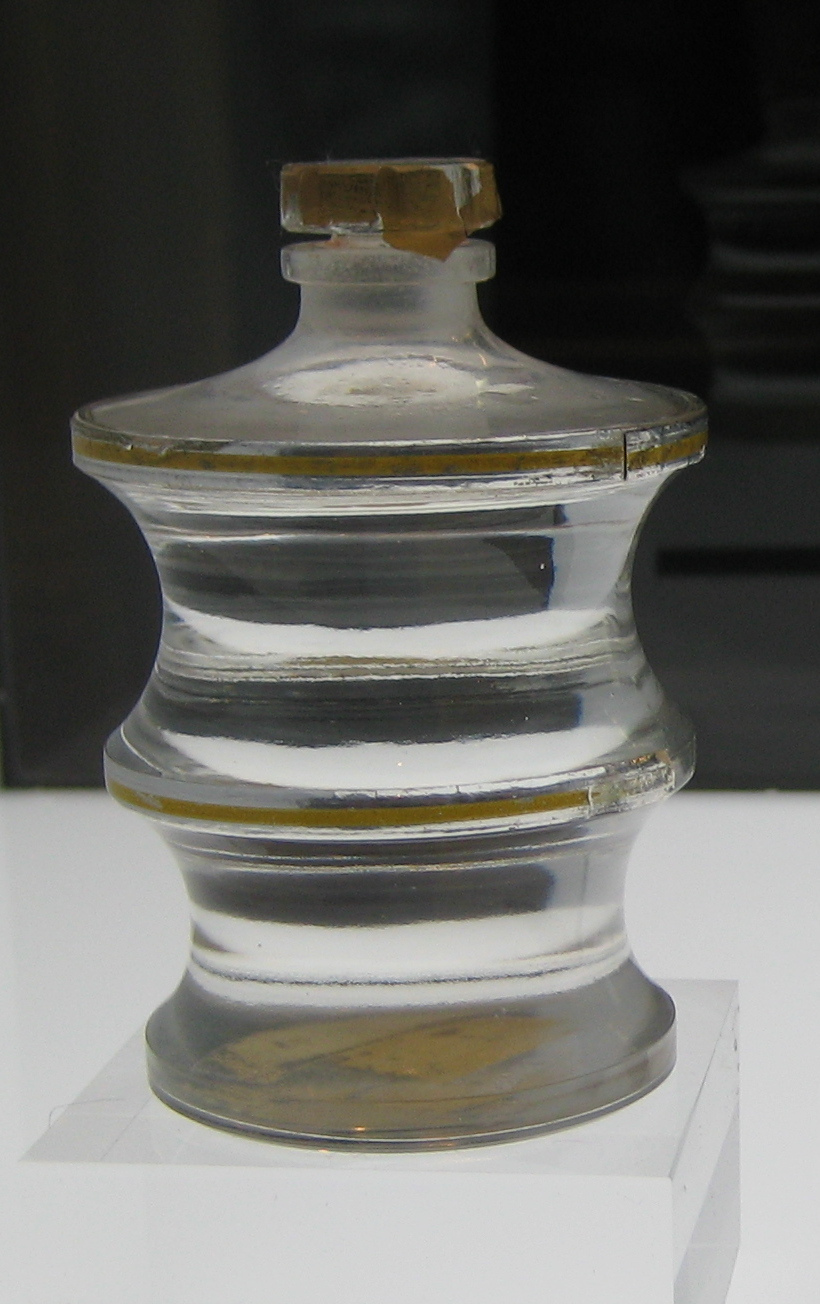
Sous Le Vent perfume bottle, 1934

Sous Le Vent (pronounced [su lə vɑ̃]) is a fragrance created by Jacques Guerlain in 1933 for the American entertainer Josephine Baker.
