= Mitsouko =

Perfume

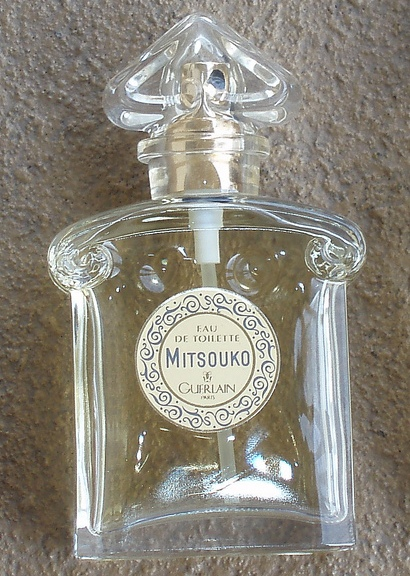

Fragrance by Guerlain
- Category: Fruity chypre
- Designed for: Women
- Top notes: Bergamot
- Heart notes: Peach; Jasmine; Rose
- Base notes: Patchouli; Oakmoss; Vetiver
- Released: 1919; 107 years ago
- Label: Guerlain
- Perfumer(s): Jacques Guerlain
- Concentration: Eau de Parfum; Eau de Toilette; Parfum Extrait
- Website: Official website

Mitsouko is a perfume by French perfume and cosmetics house Guerlain, created by Jacques Guerlain and first introduced in 1919. Its name is derived from the French transliteration of a Japanese female personal name Mitsuko. It is a fruity chypre whose top notes include bergamot, its middle notes peach, rose, iris, clove, and jasmine, and its base notes vetiver, oakmoss, and labdanum.

== History ==
Mitsouko was created by perfumer Jacques Guerlain in 1919. The perfume has remained continuously available ever since.

Mitsouko is preserved in its original 1919 formulation in the archives of the Osmothèque, donated to the collection by Guerlain in-house perfumer Thierry Wasser. It has been re-formulated several times in the modern era. It was a favorite fragrance of Charlie Chaplin, Ingrid Bergman, Jean Harlow, Sergei Diaghilev, and Anaïs Nin.

== Name ==
There is no definitive information on the origin of the name. One account of the origin of the name is that it was inspired by the name of the heroine of Claude Farrère's novel La bataille (The Battle). The novel is set in Japan during the 1905 Russo-Japanese War, and chronicles a fictional amour fou between a British Navy Officer and one "Mitsouko", the wife of Fleet Admiral Marquis Yorisaka. Both Yorisaka and the British officer sail to war, and Mitsouko awaits with reserve to see which of the two will return alive to her.

The other possibility is that it was inspired by the story of Mitsuko Aoyama, the mother of Richard von Coudenhove-Kalergi.
