= Ethylvanillin =

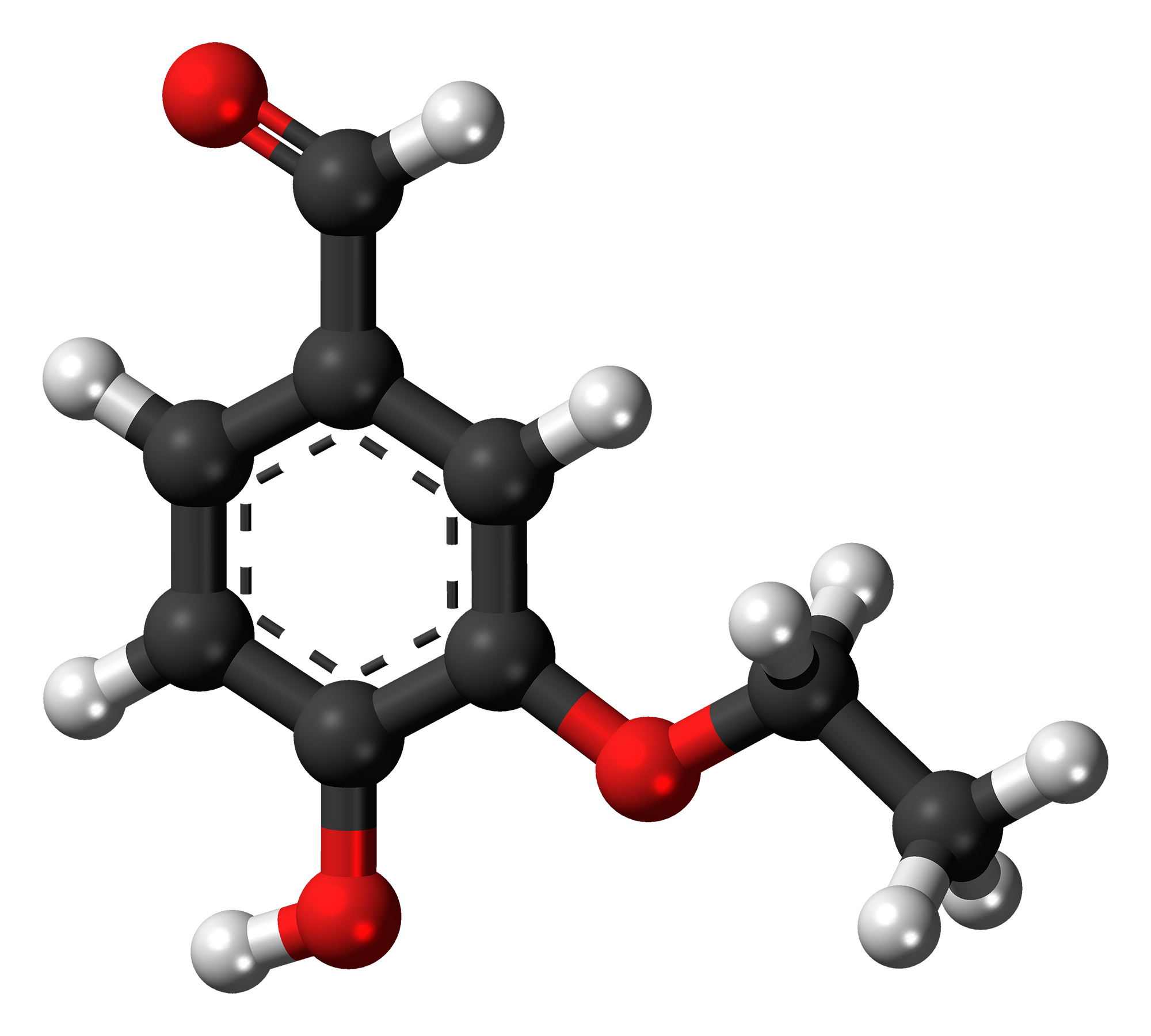
- Ball-and-stick model of the ethylvanillin molecule

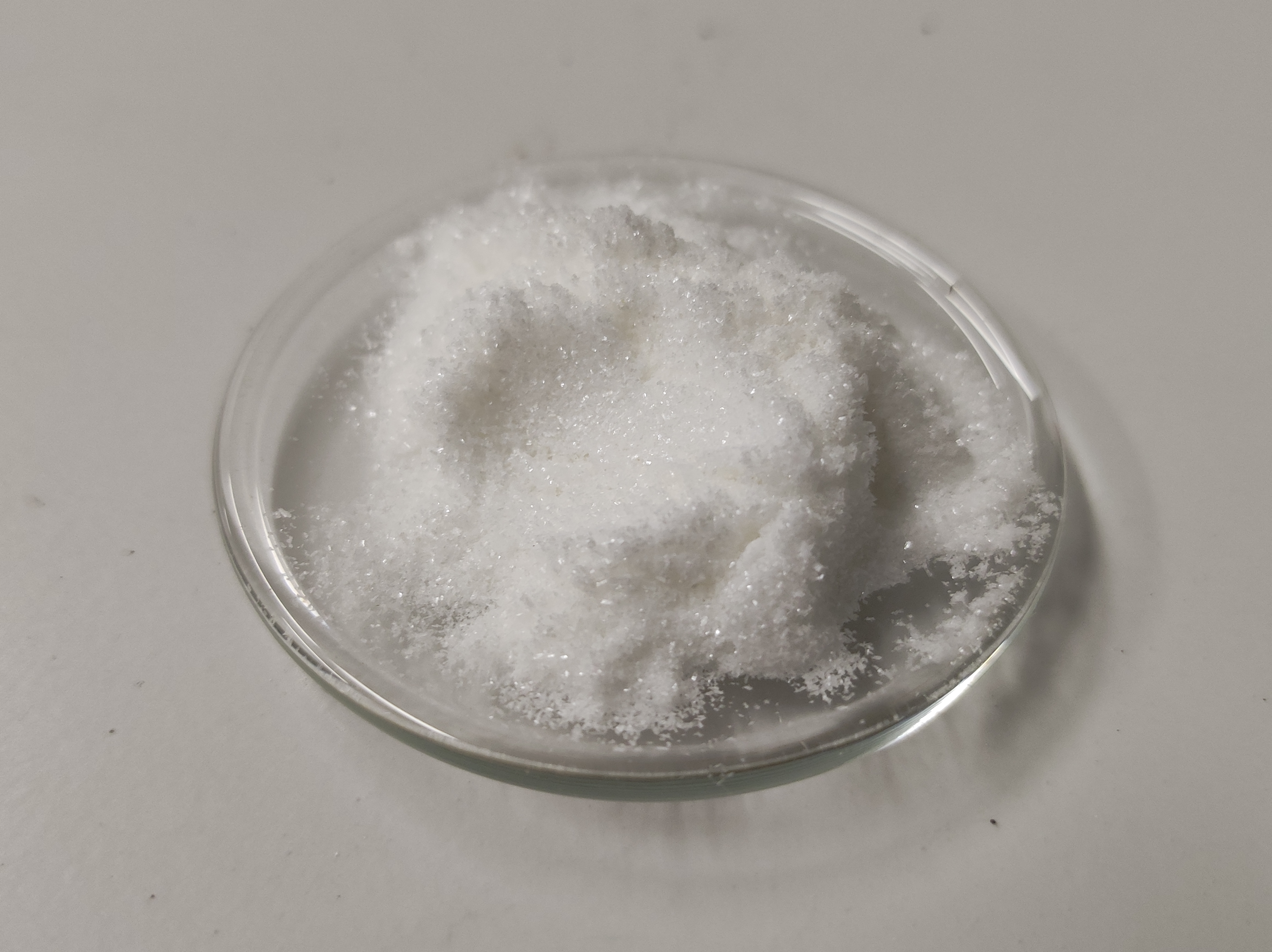

Names
- Preferred IUPAC name 3-Ethoxy-4-hydroxybenzaldehyde
- Other names Bourbonal

Identifiers
CAS Number	121-32-4
3D model (JSmol)	Interactive image
ChEBI	CHEBI:48408
ChEMBL	ChEMBL508676
ChemSpider	8154
ECHA InfoCard	100.004.059
KEGG	D01086
PubChem CID	8467
UNII	YC9ST449YJ
CompTox Dashboard (EPA)	DTXSID5021968
- InChI: InChI=1S/C9H10O3/c1-2-12-9-5-7(6-10)3-4-8(9)11/h3-6,11H,2H2,1H3 Key: CBOQJANXLMLOSS-UHFFFAOYSA-N; InChI=1/C9H10O3/c1-2-12-9-5-7(6-10)3-4-8(9)11/h3-6,11H,2H2,1H3 Key: CBOQJANXLMLOSS-UHFFFAOYAD
- SMILES: O=Cc1cc(OCC)c(O)cc1

Properties
Chemical formula	C_{9}H_{10}O_{3}
Molar mass	166.176 g·mol^{−1}
Appearance	Colourless powder
Density	1.186 g/mL
Melting point	76 °C (169 °F; 349 K)
Boiling point	295.1 °C (563.2 °F; 568.2 K)
Solubility in water	Slightly soluble in water

Hazards
- Occupational safety and health (OHS/OSH)
Main hazards	Harmful, irritant
- GHS labelling
Pictograms	(GHS07: Exclamation mark)
Signal word	Warning
Hazard statements	H319, H402
Precautionary statements	P264, P273, P280, P305+P351+P338, P337+P313, P501
NFPA 704 (fire diamond)	2 1 0
Flash point	145 °C (293 °F; 418.15K)
- Except where otherwise noted, data are given for materials in their standard state (at 25 °C [77 °F], 100 kPa). verify (what is ?) Infobox references

Ethylvanillin is the organic compound with the formula (C_{2}H_{5}O)(HO)C_{6}H_{3}CHO. This colorless solid consists of a benzene ring with hydroxyl, ethoxy, and formyl groups on the 4, 3, and 1 positions, respectively. It is a homologue of vanillin, differing on the 3 position.

== Preparation ==
Ethylvanillin is prepared from catechol, beginning with ethylation to give guaethol (1). This ether condenses with glyoxylic acid to give the corresponding mandelic acid derivative (2), which by oxidation (3) and decarboxylation, gives ethylvanillin (4).

== Application ==
As a flavorant, ethylvanillin is about three times as potent as vanillin and is used in the production of chocolate. Its aroma is described as "sweet, creamy, vanilla, caramellic, root beer". Besides its applications in the food industry, ethylvanillin is also widely used in perfumes, cosmetics, air fresheners, and pharmaceuticals.

The molecule revolutionized both the design and aesthetics of olfactory art; artist Jacques Guerlain added a large quantity of it to a bottle of Jicky (1889) perfume, creating the main accord for the perfume house's flagship fragrance, Shalimar (perfume) (1925). This is one of the earliest uses of synthetic molecules that freed scent artists from the limits of natural materials.

Ethylvanillin [121-32-4] is involved in the synthesis of methyl dilantilis.

Reduction of the benzaldehyde group in ethylvanillin to a methyl group yields a compound called Ultravanil (vanilla cresol) [2563-07-7].
