= Annick Ménardo =

French perfumer

Annick Ménardo is a French perfumer who has worked for the fragrance firm Firmenich since 1991.

== Education ==
Ménardo has a background in biochemistry and medicine. She studied perfumery and is a graduate of the French perfume academy ISIPCA. She was mentored by Michel Almairac while working at Créations Aromatiques, and her early work is influenced by his style.

== Career ==
Ménardo worked with sculptor Nobi Shioya in his /7S/ olfactory art installation. She created the scent for the sculpture "Anger". Nobi said she was easily assigned to the piece "because (she) is always angry."

=== Works ===
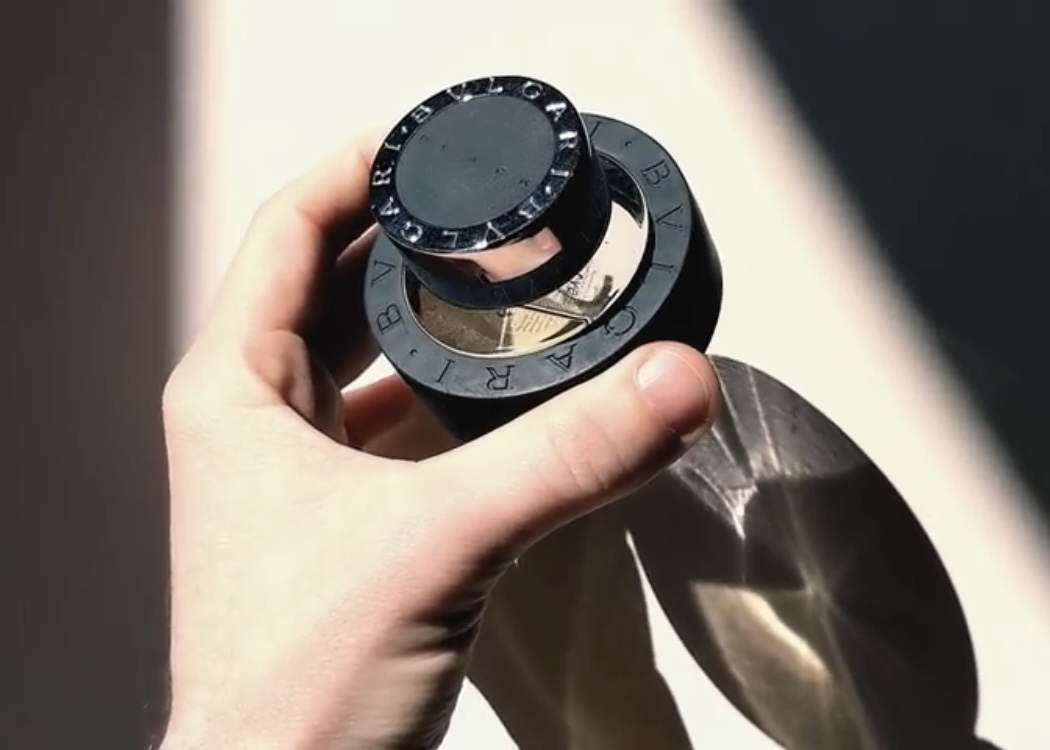
Bulgari Black by Annick Ménardo

Annick Ménardo has created perfumes including:

- Lolita Lempicka Au Masculin, Lolita Lempicka
- Body Kouros, Yves Saint Laurent
- Hypnotic Poison, Christian Dior
- Bois d'Argent, Christian Dior
- Boss Bottled, Hugo Boss
- Black, Bvlgari
- Lolita Lempicka, Lolita Lempicka
- Gaiac 10, Le Labo
- Patchouli 24, Le Labo
- Bois d'Armenie, Guerlain
- Altikä, Yves Rocher
- Comme une Evidence Femme, Yves Rocher
- Miracle So Magic, Lancôme
- Fuel For Life, Diesel
- Jaïpur Homme, Boucheron
- Visit, Loris Azzaro
- Red, Lacoste
- Moment de Bonheur, Yves Rocher
- Rose Oud, Yves Rocher
- Xeryus Rouge, Givenchy
- Sports Car Club, Penhaligon's
