= Thierry Wasser =

French perfumer

Thierry Wasser is a contemporary perfumer who as of 2008 was appointed as the in-house perfumer of Guerlain. Prior to this he worked under the fragrance firms Firmenich and Givaudan.

After attaining his Federal Diploma of Botany at age twenty, Wasser attended the Givaudan perfumery school and was promoted to perfumer at twenty four after a period of apprenticeship. He joined Firmenich in 1993. Here he collaborated extensively with Annick Ménardo in numerous fragrances.

His work includes collaborating with Jean-Paul Guerlain (perfumer) in the creation of perfumes.

== Works ==
Thierry Wasser has created many notable perfumes including:

- Parfums Christian Dior Addict (2002), with Christian Dussoulier
- Lancôme Hypnôse (2005), with Annick Ménardo
- Diesel Fuel for Life Femme (2007), with Annick Ménardo and Jacques Cavallier-Belletrud
- Guerlain Quand Vient La Pluie (2007), with Sylvaine Delacourte
- Jil Sander Man (2007), with Annick Ménardo
- Guerlain Idylle (2009)
- Guerlain La Petite Robe Noire (2012)
- Guerlain L’Homme Idéal (2014)
- Guerlain Aqua Allegoria (23 of the fragrances in this line)

== See also ==
- Interview on swiss tv

Guerlain Homme L'eau

- Marie Urban Le Febvre
- Roja Dove
- Francis Kurkdjian
