= Les Mesnuls =

- Commune
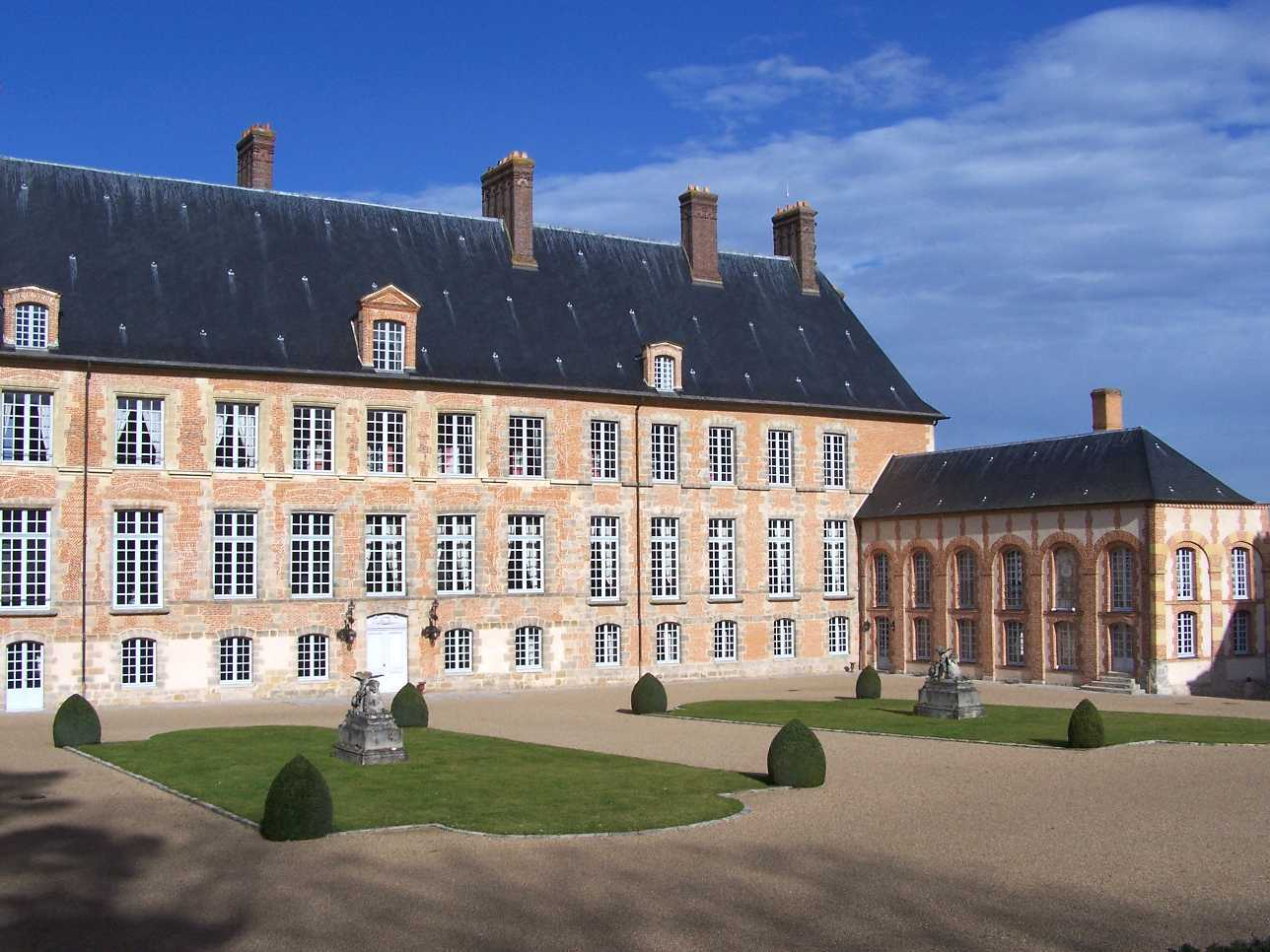
- Chateau of Mesnuls
- Location of Les Mesnuls
- Location within France Location within Île-de-France (region)
- Coordinates: 48°45′25″N 1°50′20″E
- Country: France
- Region: Île-de-France
- Department: Yvelines
- Arrondissement: Rambouillet
- Canton: Aubergenville

Government
  - Mayor (2020–2026): Michel Roux
- Area^{1}: 6.49 km^{2} (2.51 sq mi)
- Elevation: 112 m (367 ft)
- Highest elevation: 184 m (604 ft)
- Lowest elevation: 93 m (305 ft)
- Population (2023): 910
  - Density: 140/km^{2} (360/sq mi)
- Time zone: UTC+01:00 (CET)
  - Summer (DST): UTC+02:00 (CEST)
- INSEE/Postal code: 78398 /78490
- ^{1} French Land Register data, which excludes lakes, ponds, glaciers > 1 km^{2} (0.386 sq mi or 247 acres) and river estuaries.

Les Mesnuls (French pronunciation: [le mɛnyl]) is a commune in the Yvelines department in the Île-de-France region in north-central France. It is located in the south-western suburbs of Paris 16 km (9.9 mi) north of Rambouillet, in the canton of Aubergenville.

== History ==
The place was called Ménil until the 13th century, before becoming Les Mesnils, then Les Mesnuls. The name derives from Latin mansionile, meaning a small mansio, or dwelling

== Interesting Sights ==
- Église Saint-Éloi, 15th century.
- The Château des Mesnuls: the first elements (entrance gate, moat) were built during the 16th century, and the main body dates from 1731. Protected since 1945, it has been classified as monument historique since 1975.
- Chapelle Notre-Dame du Chêne on the road to Montfort-l'Amaury, built around 1825.
- Communal laundry house in rue du Moulin, 19th century.

== See also ==
- Communes of the Yvelines department
