= Mathilde Laurent =

French perfumer

- Education: Institut supérieur international du parfum, de la cosmétique et de l'aromatique alimentaire
- Occupation: Perfumer
- Employer: Cartier

Mathilde Laurent is a French perfumer. After studying perfumery at ISIPCA in Versailles, Laurent began her career as an apprentice to Jean-Paul Guerlain. She went on to work at Guerlain for 11 years. Since 2006, she has been the in-house perfumer for Cartier, creating perfumes like Baiser Volé.

== Early life ==
Born to a family of artists, Laurent grew up in the Montparnasse neighborhood of Paris, near the railroad tracks. She earned a degree (DEUG) in chemistry and physics, then attended the Institut supérieur international du parfum, de la cosmétique et de l'aromatique alimentaire (ISIPCA) in Versailles, encouraged by a family friend who'd heard about the school on the news and immediately thought of Laurent's habit of "encountering the world nose first, whether to describe a plate of food or the atmosphere of a new house".

== Career ==
=== Guerlain ===
At a school event, Laurent approached Jean-Paul Guerlain, then the head perfumer of the Guerlain family succession of perfumers, and asked him for an internship. Guerlain replied, "Why not?" and so Laurent began her career in the early 1990s working alongside Guerlain. After her three-month internship, she was offered a permanent position at the house, and ultimately stayed with the company for the next 11 years. Her perfumes for Guerlain include Herba Fresca, inspired by early mornings walking barefoot in her grandfather's garden.

=== Cartier ===
Laurent joined Cartier in 2005.

In 2006, Laurent composed Cartier's fragrance Baiser Volé, and launched L'Heure Vertueuse in 2012, among other creations.

In her 2015 Cartier work L'Heure Perdue, Laurent used exclusively lab-created molecules, seeking to "shatter the idea that the result had to be hard, abstract, aggressive." Writing in Le Monde, Claire Dhouailly described the creation as just the opposite of this stereotype of synthetic ingredients, a fragrance that instead felt "soft, caressing, almost maternal."

In 2016, she created Cartier L'Envol, the scent used in the 2017 installation "OSNI 1- Le Nuage Parfumé" ("Unidentified Fragrant Object 1- the Perfumed Cloud") at Foire Internationale d’Art Contemporain (FIAC).

Also in 2016, Laurent launched a line of oud fragrances for Cartier called Les Heures Voyageuses. The collection has six fragrances, including Oud & Santal, Oud & Musc, Oud & Oud, and Oud Radieux.

=== Other activities ===
With Jean-Claude Ellena and Sylvaine Delacourte, Laurent is one of 16 perfumery experts who oversee the Grand Musée du Parfum in Paris.
