= Claude Farrère =

French Navy officer and writer

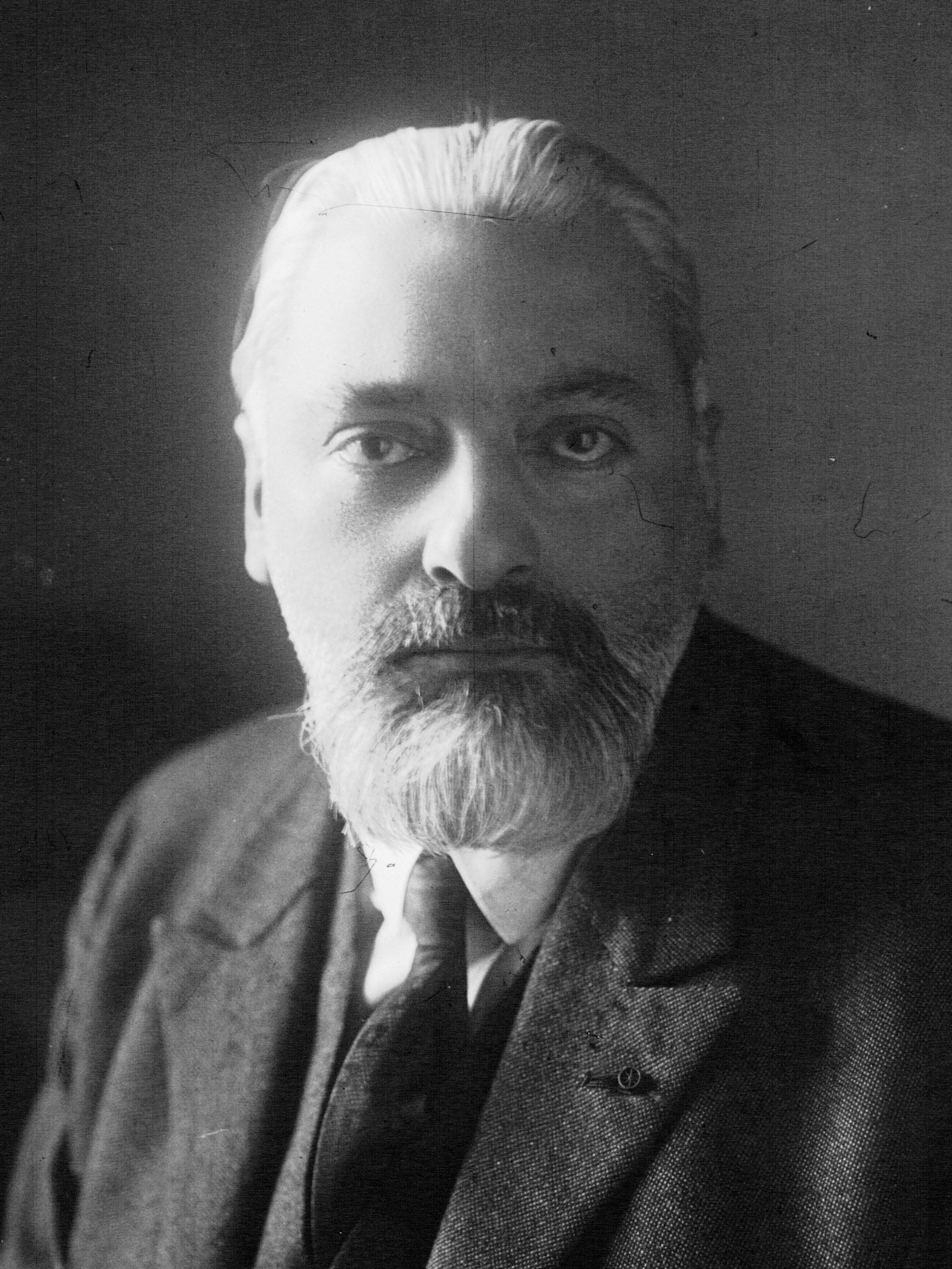
- Born: 27 April 1876; Lyon, France
- Died: 21 June 1957 (aged 81) Paris, France
- Branch: French Navy
- Rank: captain
- Awards: Prix Goncourt

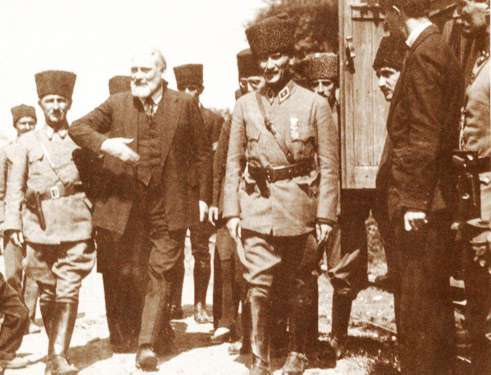
Claude Farrère supported the Turkish National Movement so he visited Atatürk (İzmit/18 June 1922)

Claude Farrère (French pronunciation: [klod faʁɛʁ]), pseudonym of Frédéric-Charles Bargone (French pronunciation: [fʁedeʁik ʃaʁl baʁɡɔn]; 27 April 1876, in Lyon – 21 June 1957, in Paris), was a French Navy officer and writer. Many of his novels are based in exotic locations such as Istanbul, Saigon, or Nagasaki.

One of his novels, Les Civilisés, about life in French colonial Indochina, won the third Prix Goncourt for 1905. He was elected to a chair at the Académie Française on 26 March 1935, in competition with Paul Claudel, partly thanks to lobbying efforts by Pierre Benoit.

== Biography ==
Initially, Claude Farrère had followed his father, an infantry colonel who served in the French colonies: He was admitted to the French Naval Academy in 1894; was made lieutenant in 1906; and was promoted to captain in 1918. He resigned the next year to concentrate on his writing career.

Claude Farrère was a friend and was partly mentored by two other famous French writers of this period, i.e. Pierre Louÿs and Pierre Loti, the latter having been as well a former Navy officer and a writer of books based in overseas countries and cultures. Farrère was a prolific writer, and many of his books are based on his overseas travels and on exotic cultures, especially in Asia, the Orient and North Africa, partly based on his travels when he was an officer with the French Navy. His works have now largely fallen from favour, even among French readers, although some of his most famous books, such as Fumée d'opium, Les Civilisés, La Bataille or Les hommes nouveaux have been republished in France at the end of the 20th century and the early 21st century.

One anecdotal and indirect reference to Claude Farrère is the perfume "Mitsouko" created by the long-lived perfumer Jacques Guerlain, with whom Claude Farrère was a friend. Mitsouko's story is found in Farrère's novel La Bataille (The Battle, 1909), which is a romance based upon Japan's modernization and westernization during the Meiji period and upon the 1905 naval Battle of Tsushima when the Imperial Japanese Navy defeated the Russian Imperial Navy. Mitsouko was a beautiful Japanese woman whose name meant both 'honeycomb' and 'mystery', who was married to a noble Japanese Navy officer and had an ill-fated love affair with an English officer. La Bataille was translated in several foreign languages, including Serbian by Veljko M. Milićević under the title Boj (The Battle), published in Sarajevo in 1912. Another Serbian author, Jelena Skerlić translated Farrère's Dix-sept histoires de marins (1914) under the title Iz mornarskog života: priče also published in Sarajevo in 1920.

Farrère's name has also been given to "Klod Farer Caddesi" (as spelled in Turkish), a street in Sultanahmet, Istanbul for his favourable description of Turkish culture and Turks. Orhan Pamuk's publisher, İletişim Publishing, is situated on this street

A number of Farrère's novels were translated and published under his real name, Frédéric-Charles Bargone.

On 6 May 1932, at the opening of a Paris book fair at the Hôtel Salomon de Rothschild, Farrère was in conversation with French President Paul Doumer when several shots were fired by Paul Gorguloff, a Russian émigré. Doumer was fatally wounded. Farrère wrestled with the assassin until the police arrived.

As a traditionalist conservative intellectual, he sympathized with the Rebel faction and the Francoist dictatorship in Spain, and he also was one of the French Academy members that actively supported the collaborationist Vichy Regime, helping to legitimize Marshal Pétain's authority. Farrère denounced the “bad shepherds” that, according to him, led prewar French society to “decadence”.

== Bibliography ==
- Le Cyclone (1902)
- Fumée d'opium (1904, Black Opium), ISBN 2-909052-13-3
- Les Civilisés (1905, "The Civilized Ones"), ISBN 2-909052-16-8
- L'homme qui assassina (1906, "The Man Who Killed")
- Pour vaincre la mer (1906)
- Mademoiselle Dax, jeune fille (1907)
- Trois hommes et deux femmes (1909)
- La Bataille (1909, "The Battle")
- Les Petites Alliées (1910), ISBN 2-86276-039-0
- Thomas l'Agnelet (1911, "Thomas the Lambkin"), ISBN 2-86959-551-4
- La maison des hommes vivants (1911, "The House of Secrets"), ISBN 2-277-30092-6
- Fin de Turquie (1913)
- Dix-sept histoires de marins (1914)
- Quatorze histoires de soldats (1916)
- La veille d'armes (play, 1917, with Lucien Népoty)
- La dernière déesse (1920, "The Last Goddess")
- Les condamnés à mort (1920, "Useless Hands")
- Roxelane (1920)
- La vieille histoire (1920)
- Bêtes et gens qui s'aimèrent (1920)
- Croquis d'Extrême-Orient (1921)
- L'extraordinaire aventure d'Achmet Pacha Djemaleddine (1921)
- Contes d'Outre-Mer et d'autres mondes (1921)
- Les Hommes nouveaux (1922, "New Men")
- Stamboul (1922)
- Lyautey l'Africain (1922)
- Histoires de très loin et d'assez près (1923)
- Trois histoires d'ailleurs (1923)
- Mes voyages: La promenade d'Extrême-Orient (vol. 1, 1924), ISBN 2-909052-15-X
- Combats et batailles sur mer (1925, with Commandant Chack)
- Une aventure amoureuse de Monsieur de Tourville (1925)
- Une jeune fille voyagea (1925)
- L'Afrique du Nord (1925)
- Mes voyages: En Méditerranée (vol. 2, 1926)
- Le dernier dieu (1926)
- Cent millions d'or (1927)
- Princesses créoles (1927 with Auguste Nemours)
- La nuit en mer (A night at sea), (Ed. Ernest Flammarion, Paris, 1928)
- L'autre côté (1928)
- La porte dérobée (1929)
- La marche funèbre (1929)
- Loti (1929)
- Loti et le chef (1930)
- Shahrâ sultane et la mer (1931)
- L'Atlantique en rond (1932)
- Deux combats navals, 1914 (1932)
- Sur mer, 1914 (1933)
- Les quatre dames d'Angora (1933)
- La quadrille des mers de Chine (1933)
- Histoire de la Marine française (1934)
- L'Inde perdue (1935), ISBN 2-909052-11-7
- Sillages, Méditerranée et navires (1936)
- L'homme qui était trop grand (1936, with P. Benoît)
- Visite aux Espagnols (1937)
- Les forces spirituelles de l'Orient (1937)
- Le grand drame de l'Asie (1938)
- Les Imaginaires (1938)
- La onzième heure (1940)
- L'homme seul (1942)
- Fern-Errol (1943)
- La seconde porte (1945)
- La gueule du lion (1946)
- La garde aux portes de l'Asie (1946)
- La sonate héroïque (1947)
- Escales d'Asie (1947)
- Job, siècle XX (1949)
- La sonate tragique (1950)
- Je suis marin (1951)
- La dernière porte (1951)
- Le Traître (1952)
- La sonate à la mer (1952)
- L'élection sentimentale (1952)
- Les petites cousines (1953)
- Mon ami Pierre Louïs (1953)
- Jean-Baptise Colbert (1954)
- Le juge assassin (1954)
- Lyautey créateur (1955)

== Filmography ==
- L'homme qui assassina, directed by Henri Andréani (Silent, 1913, based on the novel L'homme qui assassina)
- Die Liebe des van Royk, directed by Lupu Pick (Silent, 1918, based on the novel L'homme qui assassina)
- The Right to Love, directed by George Fitzmaurice (Silent, 1920, based on the novel L'homme qui assassina)
- Les Hommes nouveaux, directed by Émile-Bernard Donatien and Édouard-Émile Violet (Silent, 1922, based on the novel Les Hommes nouveaux)
- The Battle, directed by Sessue Hayakawa and Édouard-Émile Violet (Silent, 1923, based on the novel La Bataille)
- Veille d'armes, directed by Jacques de Baroncelli (Silent, 1925, based on the play La veille d'armes)
- Night Watch, directed by Alexander Korda (Silent, 1928, based on the play La veille d'armes)
- La maison des hommes vivants, directed by Marcel Dumont and Gaston Roudès (French, 1929, based on the play La maison des hommes vivants)
- Stamboul, directed by Dimitri Buchowetzki (English, 1931, based on the novel L'homme qui assassina)
  - The Man Who Murdered, directed by Curtis Bernhardt (German, 1931, based on the novel L'homme qui assassina)
  - L'Homme qui assassina, directed by Curtis Bernhardt and Jean Tarride (French, 1931, based on the novel L'homme qui assassina)
  - El hombre que asesinó, directed by Dimitri Buchowetzki and Fernando Gomis (Spanish, 1932, based on the novel L'homme qui assassina)
- The Woman from Monte Carlo, directed by Michael Curtiz (English, 1932, based on the play La veille d'armes)
- La Bataille, directed by Nicolas Farkas and Victor Tourjansky (French, 1934, based on the novel La Bataille)
  - The Battle, directed by Nicolas Farkas and Victor Tourjansky (English, 1934, based on the novel La Bataille)
- Veille d'armes, directed by Marcel L'Herbier (French, 1935, based on the play La veille d'armes)
- Les Hommes nouveaux, directed by Marcel L'Herbier (French, 1936, based on the novel Les Hommes nouveaux)
- Les Petites Alliées, directed by Jean Dréville (French, 1936, based on the novel Les Petites Alliées)
