= Guerlain =

French perfume house

Guerlain S.A.

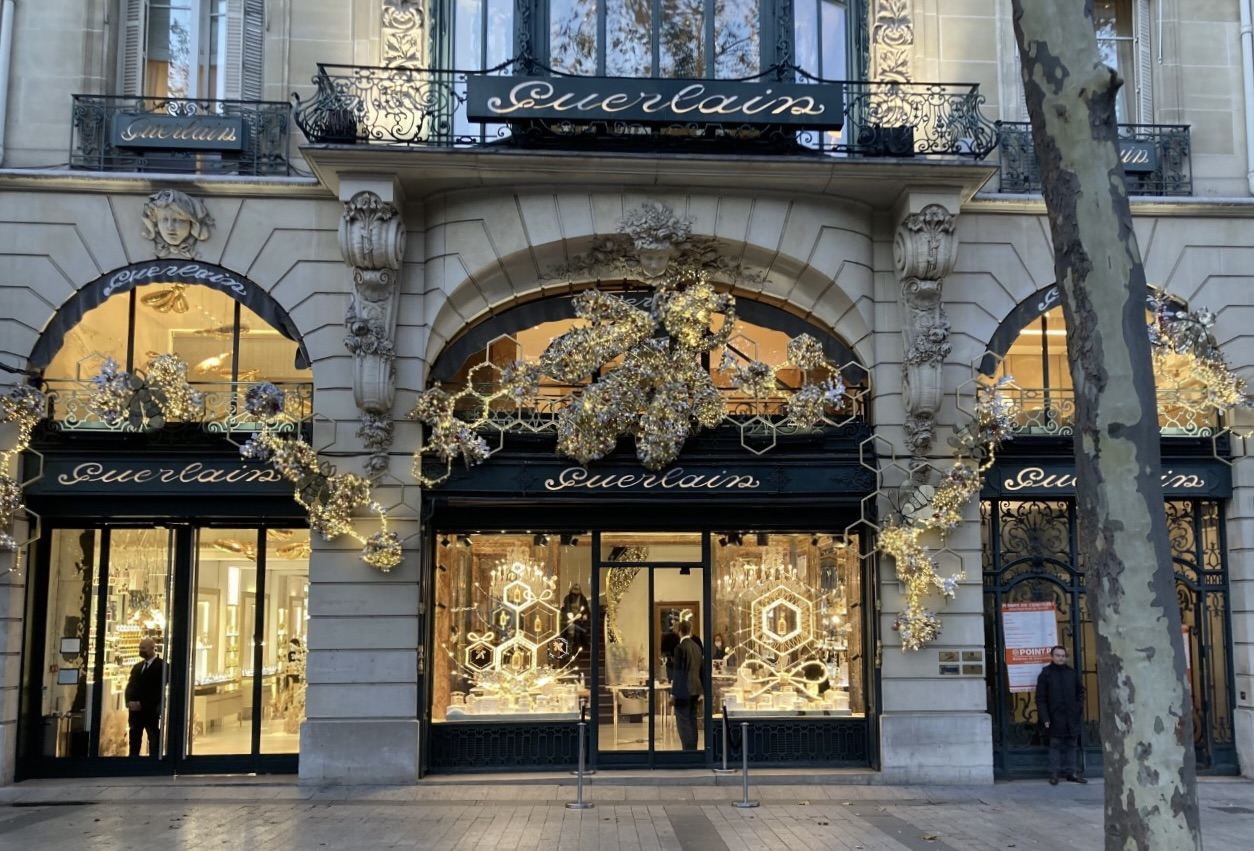
- Type: Subsidiary
- Industry: Cosmetics
- Founded: 1828 (198 years ago)
- Founder: Pierre-François-Pascal Guerlain
- Headquarters: Paris, France
- Products: Perfumes; Cosmetics; Skin care; Hair care
- Revenue: ▲€666.2 million (2022)
- Parent: LVMH
- Website: Official website

Guerlain (French pronunciation: [ɡɛʁlɛ̃]) is a French luxury perfume, cosmetics, and skincare house which is among the oldest in the world. Many traditional Guerlain fragrances are characterized by a common olfactory accord known as the "Guerlinade".

The house was founded in Paris in 1828 by the perfumer Pierre-François Pascal Guerlain. It was run by the Guerlain family until 1994, when it was bought by the French multinational company LVMH.

Its flagship store is 68, Avenue des Champs-Elysées in Paris.

== History ==
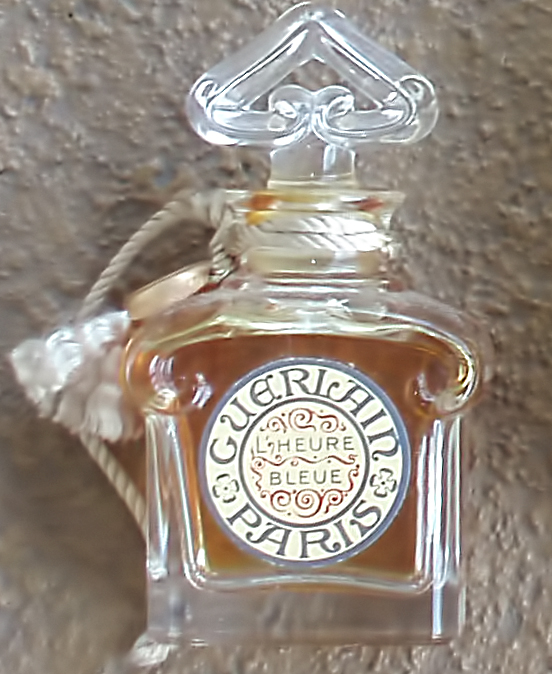
Guerlain's L'Heure Bleue

The House of Guerlain was owned and managed by members of the Guerlain family from its inception in 1828 to 1994. It was acquired in 1994 by the LVMH group, a French multinational investment corporation specializing in luxury brands.

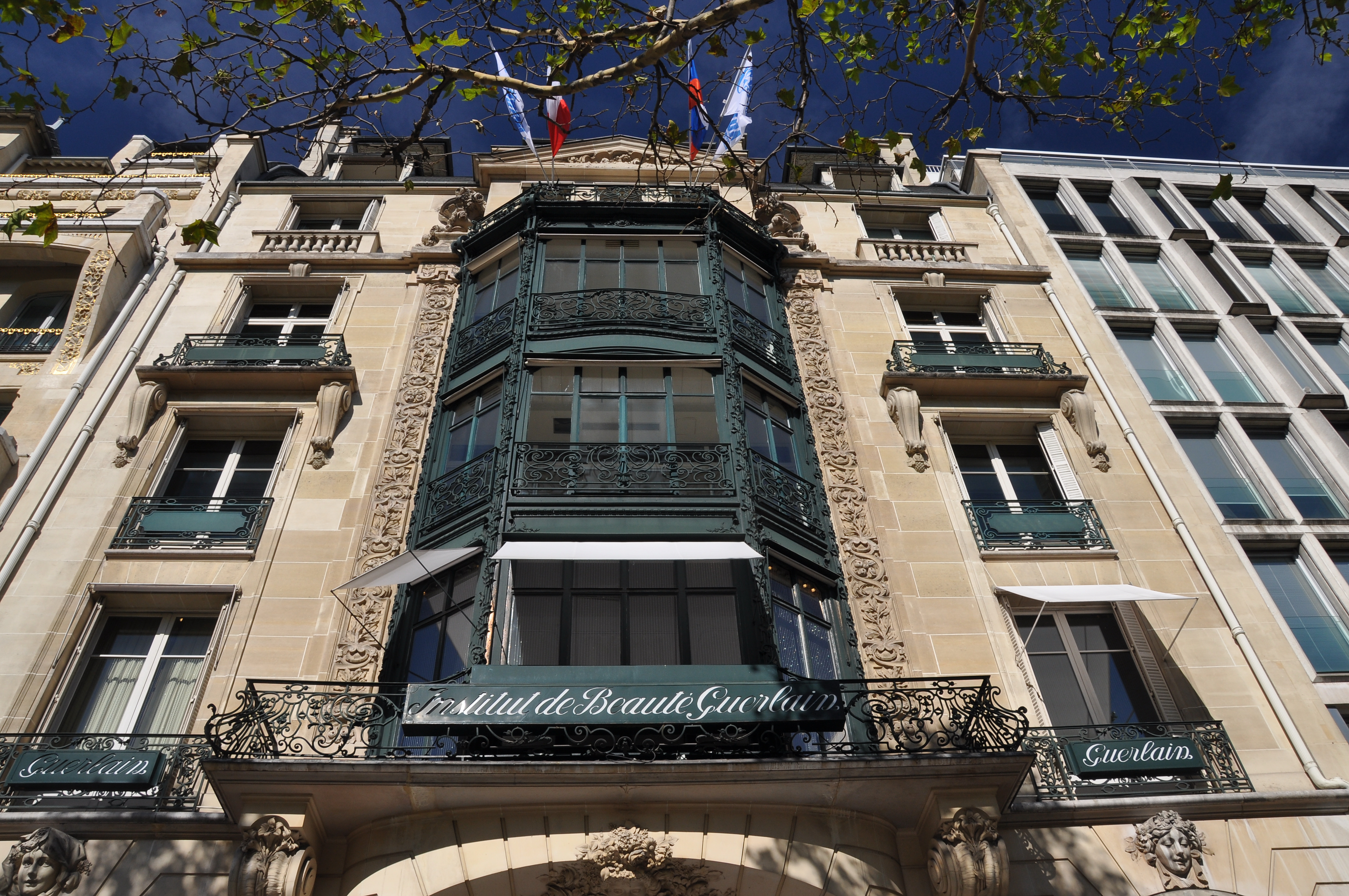
A Guerlain boutique on the Champs-Élysées, in Paris

=== Beginning ===
The House of Guerlain was founded in 1828, when Pierre-François Pascal Guerlain opened his perfume store at 42, rue de Rivoli in Paris. As both the founder and first perfumer of the house, Pierre-François composed and manufactured custom fragrances with the help of his two sons, Aimé and Gabriel. Through continued success and the patronage of members in high society, Guerlain opened its flagship store at 15, rue de la Paix in 1840, and put its mark on the Parisian fashion scene.

The success of the house under Pierre-François peaked in 1853 with the creation of Eau de Cologne Impériale for French Emperor Napoleon III and his Spanish-French wife Empress Eugénie. This perfume earned Pierre-François the prestigious title of being His Majesty's Official Perfumer. Guerlain went on to create perfumes for Queen Victoria of the United Kingdom and Queen Isabella II of Spain, among other royalty.

=== Second generation ===
With the death of Pierre-François in 1864, the house was left to his sons Aimé Guerlain and Gabriel Guerlain. The roles of perfumer and manager were divided between the two brothers, with Gabriel managing and further expanding the house, and Aimé becoming the master perfumer. The House of Guerlain thus began a long tradition whereby the position of master perfumer was handed down through the Guerlain family.

As Guerlain's second generation in-house perfumer, Aimé was the creator of many classic compositions, including Fleur d'Italie (1884), Rococo (1887) and Eau de Cologne du Coq (1894). However, many would argue that his greatest composition was 1889's Jicky, the first fragrance described as a "parfum" rather than an eau de cologne, and among the first to use synthetic ingredients alongside natural extracts.

=== Third generation ===
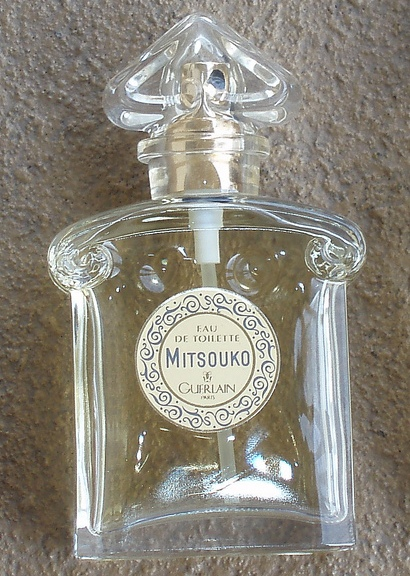
Guerlain's Mitsouko

The business was handed down to the sons of Gabriel Guerlain: Jacques Guerlain and Pierre Guerlain. Jacques, Aimé's nephew, became Guerlain's third master perfumer; he was the author of many of Guerlain's most famous classics, which are still held in high esteem in the modern perfume industry. Many of his perfumes are still sold and marketed today. Among Jacques Guerlain's most important creations are Mouchoir de Monsieur (1904), Après L'Ondée (1906), L'Heure Bleue (1912), Mitsouko (1919), Guerlain's flagship fragrance Shalimar (1925), and Vol de Nuit (1933). Jacques composed his final perfume, Ode (1955), with the assistance of his grandson, then-18-year-old Jean-Paul Guerlain.

=== Fourth generation ===
Jean-Paul Guerlain was the last family master perfumer. He created Guerlain's classic men's fragrances Vétiver (1959) and Habit Rouge (1965). He also created Chant d'Arômes (1962) and Chamade (1969). From 1975 to 1989, he collaborated with perfumer Anne-Marie Saget, composing Nahema (1979), Jardins de Bagatelle (1983), Derby (1985) and Samsara (1989). His later work includes Héritage (1992), Coriolan (1998) and Vétiver pour Elle (2004). Jean-Paul Guerlain retired in 2002, but continued to serve as advisor to his successor until 2010, when he was terminated after making a racist remark on French television regarding the inspiration for his scent Samsara. With no heir from within the Guerlain family to take over, the role of master perfumer is no longer tied to family succession.

=== Purchase by LVMH ===
In a decision widely seen as a break with tradition, the Guerlain family sold the company to the luxury goods conglomerate LVMH in 1994. Though Jean-Paul Guerlain remained as an in-house perfumer until 2002, other perfumers were brought in after 1994 to compose perfumes for Guerlain, and Jean-Paul had to submit his compositions against those of others. Fans of the house viewed the LVMH purchase as a step towards the cheapening and commercialization of the legendary firm's legacy. Most were unhappy with the first post-LVMH release, the 1996 sweet mimosa floral Champs-Elysées, composed by Olivier Cresp, whose entry was selected over that of Jean-Paul Guerlain.

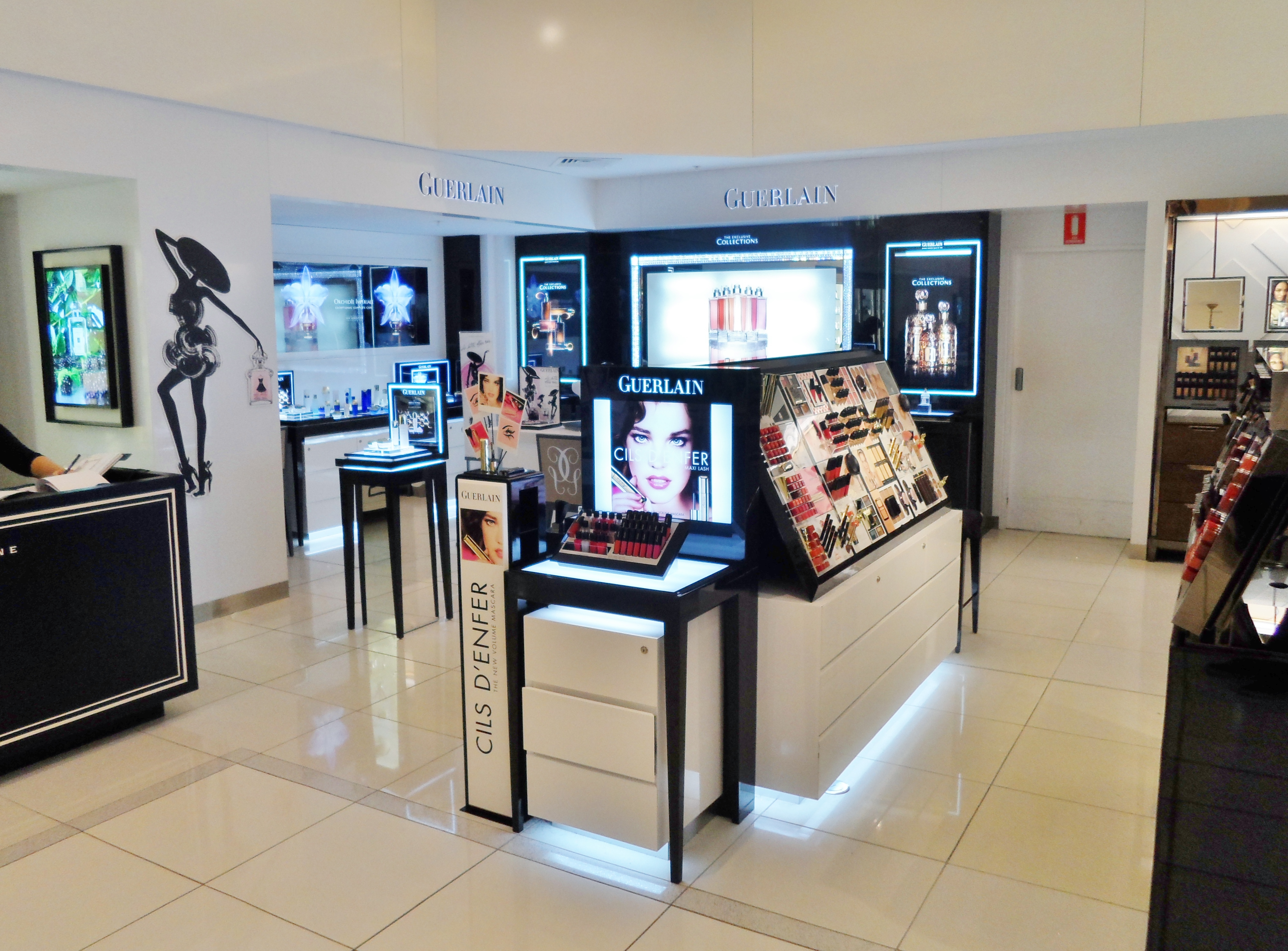
Guerlain at Australian department store David Jones in Sydney

Among the outside perfumers to compose perfumes for the firm after 1994 was Mathilde Laurent, who worked for Guerlain at the end of the 1990s and in the early 2000s. She composed Aqua Allegorica Pamplelune (1999) and Shalimar Light (2003, reattributed to Jean-Paul Guerlain and relaunched in 2004 following reformulation). Maurice Roucel, a perfumer of Symrise, composed L'Instant de Guerlain (2004) and Insolence (2006). As the niece of Jean-Jacques Guerlain, some thought Patricia de Nicolaï would have been a candidate for the position of Guerlain's in-house perfumer, though the presence of a glass ceiling in the company prevented her selection for position.

In May 2008, Thierry Wasser was named the in-house perfumer for Guerlain. Wasser, a Swiss perfumer who used to work for Firmenich, created Iris Ganache (2007) and Quand Vient la Pluie (2007) for Guerlain before his appointment the following year. Jean-Paul Guerlain stayed on in an advisory consultant role, both for fragrance design and ingredients. Wasser was to work closely with Sylvaine Delacourte, Guerlain's Artistic Director. In 2010, the LVMH Group cut ties with Jean-Paul Guerlain as their consultant due to his racist comments on French television.

Russian model Natalia Vodianova has been the face of Guerlain campaigns since 2008. Vodianova began advertising Shalimar to celebrate the perfume house's 180th birthday. For the Fall 2013 makeup collection, Olivier Echaudemaison, Guerlian's Creative Director of Makeup since 2000 commented "Every season we fantasize with Natalia's image and invent for her a new role. For us, it is not just a model, which advertises cosmetics, but above all, a great actress".

In October 2011, the company named Malaysian actress Michelle Yeoh as a new spokesmodel. Yeoh is an ambassador for the Orchidée Impériale line of skincare.

In 2018, Guerlain founded an initiative to raise awareness around bee protection which launched globally in 2021. As part of this initiative, the House invited friends to lead Bee School Sessions to raise awareness among the youth of today. UK ambassador Camille Charrière taught a Bee School Session in May 2023 in Notting Hill at Hampden Gurney Primary School.

In February 2024, the Emirati artist and singer, Balqees Fathi became the Regional Ambassador for the brand in the Middle East.

== Products ==
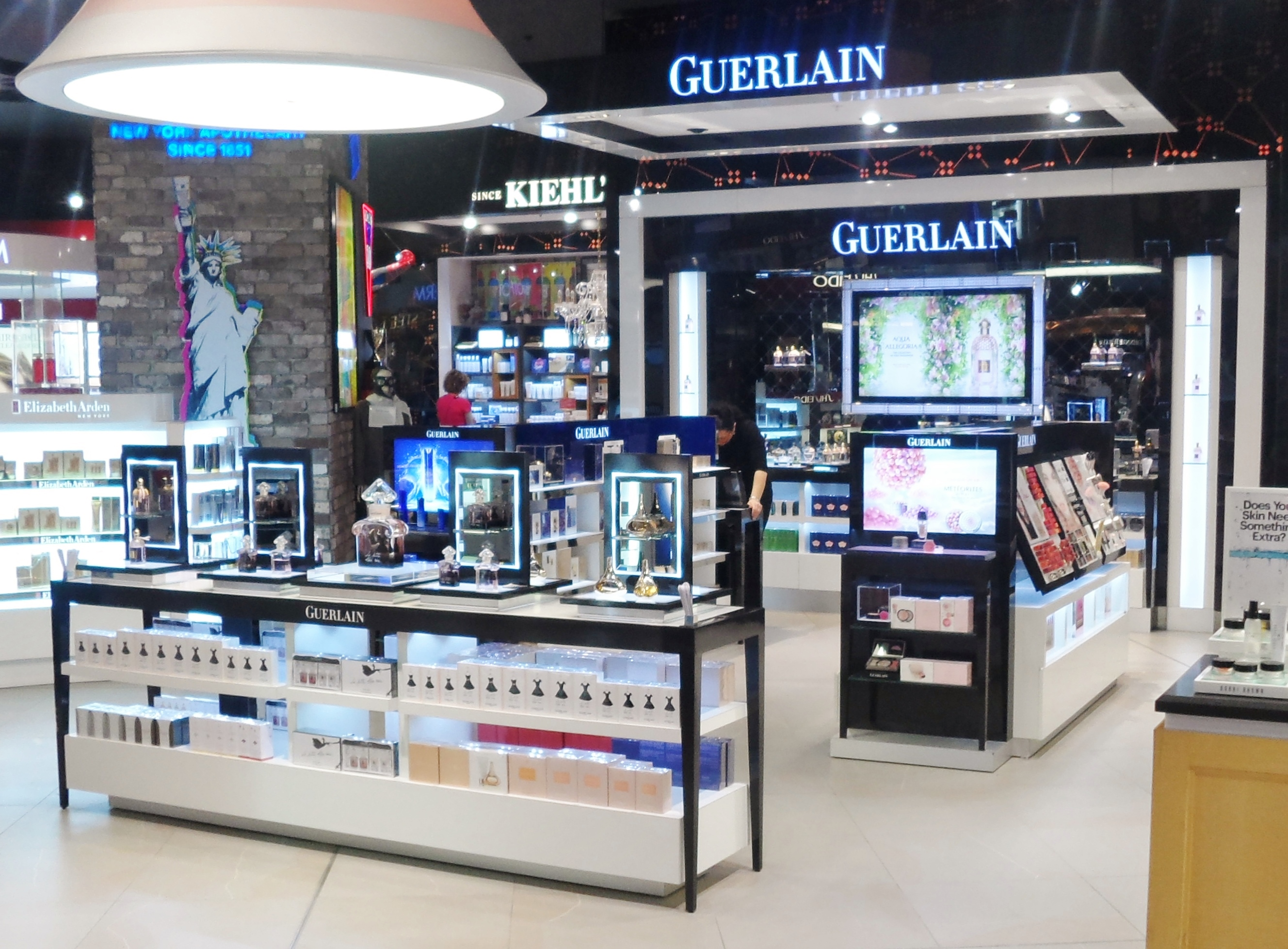
Guerlain counter at SYD Airport Tax & Duty Free

Guerlain's creations have long influenced the trends of perfumery with fragrances such as Jicky, Shalimar, Vétiver, and La Petite Robe Noire. Guerlain is among the few older houses (such as Caron) that exist solely to produce and market perfumes. Many brands in the perfume industry, such as Chanel and Jean Patou are in fact divisions of fashion houses or multinational conglomerates that license the brand name. Alongside its fragrances, today Guerlain has expanded to offer a large range of makeup and skincare. Guerlain products are available across the world at serviced counters within department stores, and at beauty stores such as fellow LVMH brand Sephora. Guerlain also maintains thirteen international beauty and spa 'boutiques', five within France (two being in Paris).

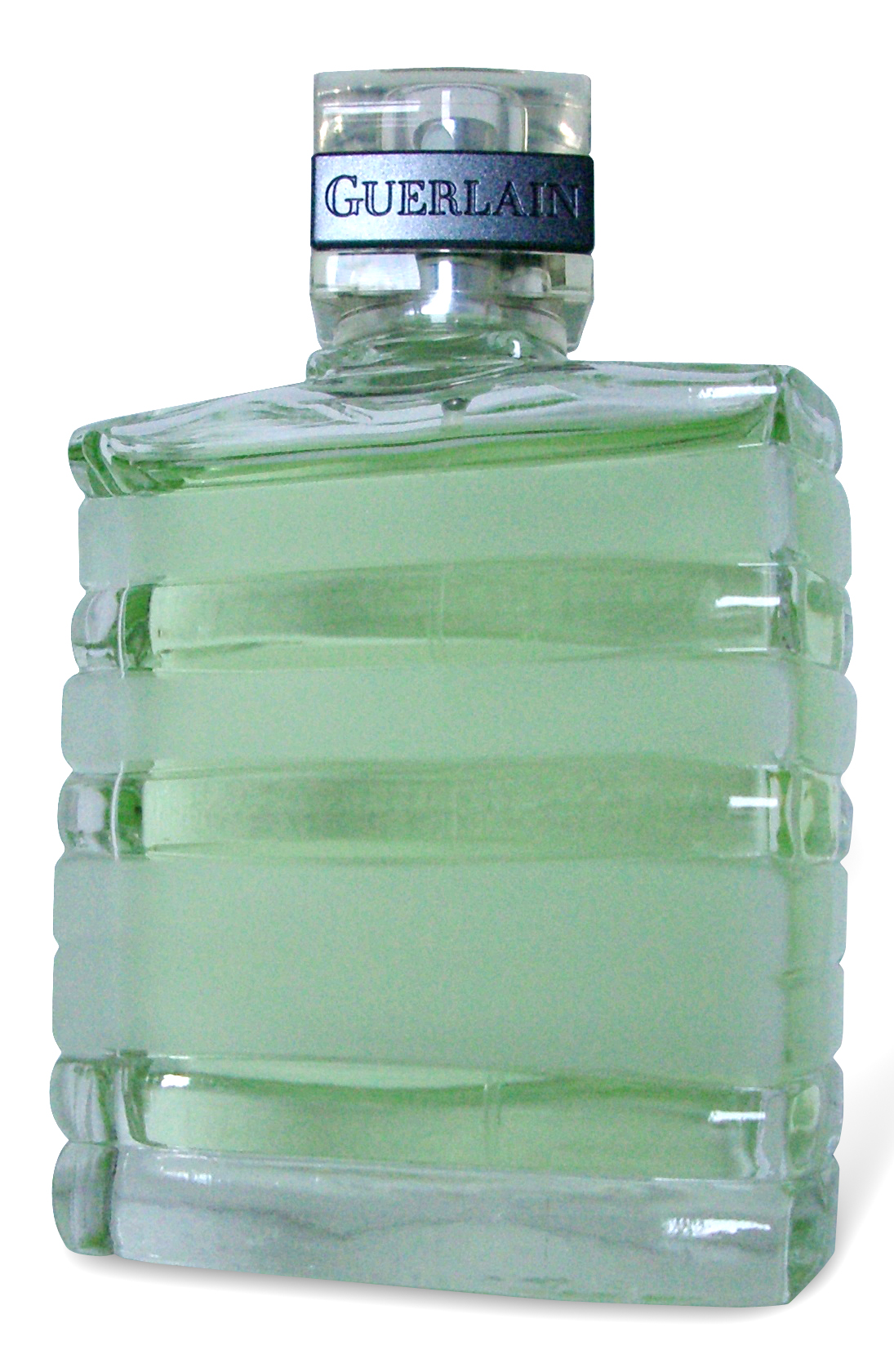
Vétiver by Guerlain. Glass flacon design by Robert Granai in 2000.

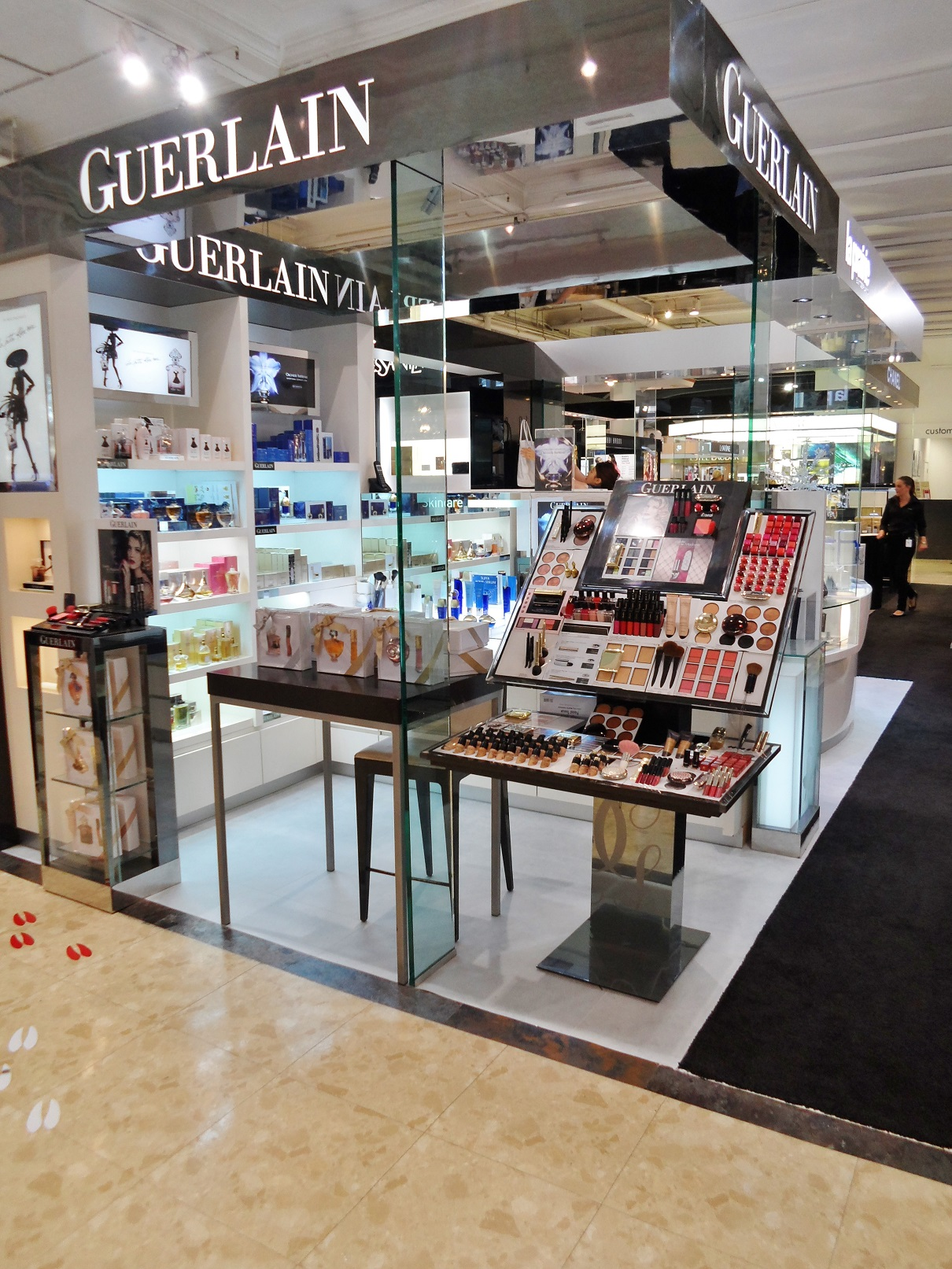
A small counter at New Zealand department store Smith & Caughey's on Queen Street, Auckland

=== Perfumes ===
Since its foundation in 1828, Guerlain has created over 600 fragrances. Among the company's most notable (in terms of longevity, sales or cultural impact) are:

Name	Year	Detail
Eau de Cologne Impériale	1830	(pronounced [od kɔlɔɲ ɛ̃peʁjal]): Guerlain first released this cologne in 1830, but it came to widespread attention in 1853 when it was adopted by Empress Eugénie, the wife of French emperor Napoléon III. She liked the composition so much that she named Guerlain an official purveyor of colognes and toiletries to the imperial family. The cologne is still in regular production.
Jicky	1889	[ʒiki]: Said to be named either after the nickname Aimé Guerlain gave to his nephew, Jacques, or after a girl who broke Aimé's heart as a student in England, Jicky is widely heralded as the first "modern" fragrance, as it was among the first fragrances to incorporate synthetic odorants in its composition. Although marketed by Guerlain as a women's fragrance, it was initially more successful with men and has proven to be a popular unisex fragrance. Jicky is still being sold, making it the oldest non-cologne fragrance in continuous production.
Eau de Cologne du Coq	1894	A classic cologne featuring prominent herbal, lavender and citrus notes.
Mouchoir de Monsieur	1904	An aromatic fougère created for men, this fragrance is close to the olfactory profile of Jicky, with aromatic lavender and a semi-amber base. It was in very limited distribution for much of the 20th century, until becoming more widely available in the early 1990s.
Après l'Ondée	1906	[apʁɛ lɔ̃de]: The name of this fragrance translates to 'after the rain shower.' Après l'Ondée is a light floral fragrance reminiscent of bitter almonds, with anise and herbal notes. Its composition includes violet, iris, heliotrope, hawthorn, anise, and herbal notes.
L'Heure Bleue	1912	[lœʁ blø]: Meaning 'The Blue Hour,' L'Heure Bleue is a floral amber fragrance with the dusky scent of candies and almond cake bought in an old world apothecary. Its powdery accord is similar to that of Après l'Ondée, but L'Heure Bleue is denser, richer, and has a more confectionery quality, while Apres l'Ondée is more floral in character and lighter and more transparent in feel. Both Apres l'Ondée and L'Heure Bleue are often perceived as melancholy scents.
Mitsouko	1919	[mitsuko]: Named after the heroine of the novel La Bataille by Claude Farrère, Mitsouko is said to herald the ending of World War I. Due to a bottle shortage at the end of the war, it was marketed in an identical bottle to that of L'Heure Bleue, and is sometimes considered to be that fragrance's warm counterpart. With Coty's fragrance no longer produced, Mitsouko is today considered by Luca Turin, a well-known perfume critic and reviewer, to be a reference fragrance in the chypre olfactive family.
Eau de Fleurs de Cédrat	1920	This classic cologne foregrounds the notes of the citron fruit, with lemon, neroli, herbs and other notes.
Shalimar	1925	[ʃalimaʁ]: Named after the garden in Lahore, built by Shah Jahan in memory of his wife, Shalimar is one of the world's most famous amber fragrances, and was one of the first perfumes to successfully incorporate large amounts of vanillin in its composition. This is the flagship perfume of the House of Guerlain.
Liù	1929	Liù, named after a tragic character in Puccini's opera Turandot, is an aldehydic floral that is said to have been inspired by the wildly successful Chanel No. 5, released in 1921. Like No. 5, it features aldehydes over a jasmine-rose heart accord. Though not especially well known compared to aldehydics such as Arpège or Chanel No. 5, the fragrance has never been discontinued.
Sous le Vent	1933	The name is the French term for the Leeward Islands (Society Islands), the Îles Sous-le-Vent. This perfume was said to be composed for the dancer, singer and French Résistance member Joséphine Baker, who spent much of her life and career in France. It was discontinued in 1972.
Vol de Nuit	1933	[vɔldənɥi]: This perfume was composed as a tribute to flight, celebrating the novel of the same name by pilot Antoine de Saint-Exupéry and Air France. Vol de Nuit's use of galbanum made it among the first fragrances to feature pronounced green notes.
Véga	1936	This floral aldehydic fragrance was inspired by the star Vega, the brightest in the night sky. The fragrance was discontinued by the 1960s, but was rereleased in a limited edition in 2006.
Vétiver	1959	This was Jean-Paul Guerlain's first fragrance after taking over as the in-house perfumer at Guerlain. A men's fragrance, it was created to replace the company's earlier Vétiver perfume and was originally targeted to the Mexican market. The original composition was an eau de cologne, but it was strengthened to an eau de toilette in the 1980s.
Chant d'Arômes	1962	Designed for and marketed to younger women, Chant d'Arômes ('Song of Scents') is a soft chypre. Quite popular in its day, the fragrance is now one of Guerlain's more obscure fragrances.
Habit Rouge	1965	Considered the first amber for men, Habit Rouge is a dense composition of bergamot, woods, spices, opopanax and amber. Like Vétiver, it was originally an eau de cologne but was reformulated as a men's eau de toilette in the 1980s.
Chamade	1969	[ʃamad]: Named after the novel by Françoise Sagan. In French, the word Chamade refers to a particular signal to an enemy made by rapid drumbeats or trumpets of an offer to negotiate surrender. Packaged in a bottle representing an upside-down heart pierced by an arrow, the fragrance is said to symbolize a total surrender to love.
Eau de Guerlain	1974	Eau de Guerlain is a unisex citrus scent inspired by classical colognes, such as Guerlain's own Eau de Cologne Impérial, Eau de Cologne du Coq and Eau des Fleurs de Cédrat.
Parure	1975	In French, a parure is a matched set of jewelry, typically a necklace, brooch and earrings, sometimes with a bracelet and tiara. Fading popularity, coupled with International Fragrance Association and European Union regulations on some of its ingredients, led to its discontinuation in the early 2000s.
Nahéma	1979	This floral amber fragrance was inspired by the legend of a sultan who had twin daughters, the gentle and obedient Mahane and the fiery and passionate Nahéma. Built predominantly around rose notes, Nahéma was an early fragrance to feature damascenones, a set of newly discovered aromachemicals. Like Parure, Nahéma was not a sales success, but the EdP remains available.
Jardins de Bagatelle	1983	Named after a formal garden planted within the Bois de Bologne on the western outskirts of Paris.
Derby	1985	A dry, woody-leather scent for men, Derby was not a sales success for Guerlain. The scent was periodically available from the 1990s but discontinued in 2021.
Samsara	1989	[sɑ̃saʁa]: Composed by Jean-Paul Guerlain and Anne-Marie Saget, this is a heady amber fragrance featuring main notes of jasmine, ylang-ylang, and sandalwood. The name is a reference to the cycle of birth, life, death, and rebirth or reincarnation in Hinduism and many other religions in South Asia.
Héritage	1992	This is an aromatic, spicy, woody scent for men. Released as an EdT, it is one of a few Guerlain masculines that later became available as an EdP.
Champs-Élysées	1996	The first major fragrance by the company released after the sale to LVMH and the first not to be composed by a member of the Guerlain family. Though it borrows the name of a 1904 Guerlain fragrance, Parfum des Champs-Elysées, the 1996 Champs-Elysées was an entirely new composition.
Aqua Allegoria Pamplelune	1999	Pamplelune was one of the original five Aqua Allegoria fragrances released by Guerlain in 1999 as simple, fresh, light compositions designed to appeal to younger consumers.
Aqua Allegoria Herba Fresca	1999	The second of the original five Aqua Allegoria fragrances that has never been out of production, Herba Fresca is a light, fresh green fragrance with herbal notes, green tea and spearmint.
Mahora / Mayotte	2000	Mahora is named after the French demonym for the people of the island of Mayotte, an overseas department of France located in the Indian Ocean off the coast of Southeast Africa. Though a major launch for Guerlain, the fragrance sold poorly and was discontinued quickly. In 2005, it reappeared under the name Mayotte in an exclusive line, but was discontinued again in the mid-2010s.
L'Instant de Guerlain	2003	Another floral amber in the range, L'Instant begins with notes of citrus and honey before moving into an accord of magnolia and white flowers over vanilla and amber.
Insolence	2006	Insolence harkens back to Guerlain's early floral ambers like L'Heure Bleue, with notes of violet, iris, and orange blossom, while adding new, modern notes of red fruit and white musk.
Guerlain Homme	2008	Guerlain Homme's top notes represent a "mojito accord," with sweet lime, peppermint and rum, over a woody base of patchouli, cedar and vetiver.
Idylle	2009	The first major fragrance composed by Thierry Wasser after taking over as the in-house perfumer at Guerlain in 2008, Idylle is a soft, modern chypre with fruity notes, rose, patchouli and white moss.
La Petite Robe Noire	2012	This fragrance, memorializing the "little black dress," was born after the accidental, unexpected success of a limited-edition fragrance by the same name composed by Delphine Jelk and released without fanfare in 2009. Its popularity convinced Guerlain to release a second limited edition in 2011, and when that also proved successful, in 2012 the company released a tweaked version of the 2009 Petite Robe Noire composition as a mass-market fragrance.
L'Homme Idéal	2014	Guerlain's first major launch for men in six years, L'Homme Idéal ('The Ideal Man') is a relaxed fougère with citrus top notes and a heart of sweet amaretto notes over cedarwood and patchouli.
Mon Guerlain	2017	Originally inspired as a modern-day counterpart to Jicky, Mon Guerlain is a sweet amber featuring lavender, jasmine, vanilla and sandalwood.
