= Constantin Weriguine =

Franco-Russian perfumer

- Born: Constantin Mikhailovich Weriguine; 6 February [O.S. 25 January] 1899; Saint Petersburg, Russian Empire
- Died: 22 December 1982 (aged 83); Paris, France
- Resting place: Sainte-Geneviève-des-Bois Russian Cemetery
- Education: Lille Catholic University
- Known for: Perfumery
- Notable work: Mais Oui, 1938; Ramage, 1951; Glamour, 1953
- Spouse: Sophie Constantinovna Schabelsky (m. 1933-1982)

Constantin Mikhailovich “Kot” Weriguine (Russian: Константи́н Михайлович Веригин, romanized: Konstantin Mikhailovich Verigin; 1899–1982) was a Franco-Russian perfumer, best remembered for his work at Chanel and Bourjois.

== Biography ==
Weriguine was born in Saint Petersburg, the son of an aristocrat and officer of the Russian hussars. He was schooled in Yalta and served as an officer of the Horse Artillery of the Imperial Guard during World War I. After the war, he lived in Constantinople and Pančevo, before obtaining a visa for France. He studied chemistry at Lille Catholic University and interned at the Parfums de Luzy, working under Claude Fraysse.

In 1926, he was hired as a perfumer at Chanel and Bourjois, seconding Ernest Beaux. He married Sophie Constantinovna Schabelsky in 1933 and had two children. He created some thirty perfumes at Bourjois, most notably Mais Oui (1938), and assisted Beaux in the creation of another twenty at Chanel and Bourjois, including Soir de Paris (1928), Bois des Îles (1929), Cuir de Russie (1935) and Kobako (1936).

During World War II, Weriguine was conscripted into the Service du travail obligatoire and sent to a chemical plant in Munich. After the war, he resumed his work at Chanel and Bourjois, eventually seconding Henri Robert from 1954 to 1962. That year, he was dismissed from the two companies, though sued for damages and won. He was subsequently hired at Rhône-Poulenc. He released his memoirs, Souvenirs et Parfums, in 1965, before retiring in 1977. Towards the end of his life, he served as vice president of the French Society of Perfumers.

Several of his major works are archived in their original form at the Osmothèque.

== Selected works ==
=== Perfumes ===
- Ashes of Carnations (1930)
- Para Ti (1930)
- Printemps de Paris (1931)
- Amok (1934)
- Chicote (1934)
- Flamme (1935)
- Mais Oui (1938)
- Courage (1939)
- Folies Bergère (1943)
- Endearing (1946)
- Beau Belle (1949)
- Fantasio (1950)
- On the Wind (1950)
- Ramage (1951)
- Roman Holiday (1951)
- French Lace (1951)
- Glamour (1953)
- Christmas in July (1954)
- Frosty Mist (1955)

=== Books ===
- Souvenirs et parfums : Mémoires d'un parfumeur (1965)

== See also ==
- Ernest Beaux
- Bourjois
- Chanel
- Osmothèque
- Perfume
- Perfumer
- Rhône-Poulenc
- Henri Robert
