= Joy (perfume) =

Perfume created for Jean Patou by Henri Alméras

Joy by Jean Patou
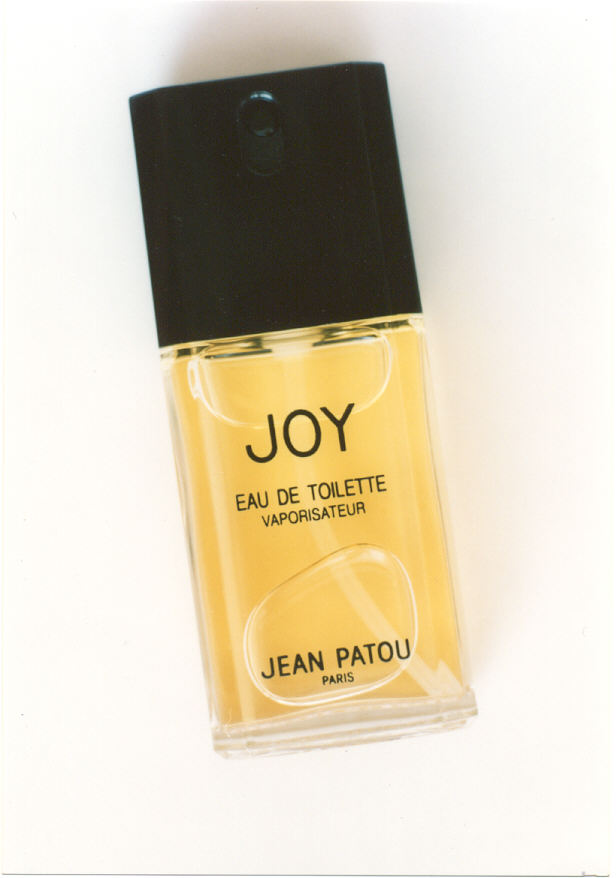

Fragrance by Jean Patou
- Released: 1929
- Label: Patou
- Website: patou.com/pages/faqs#the-patou-house

Joy is a perfume created for Parisian couturier Jean Patou by perfumer Henri Alméras in 1929.

It is considered to be one of the greatest fragrances created and is a landmark example of the floral genre in perfumery. It is no longer produced.

== History ==
Joy was created as a reaction to the 1929 Wall Street crash, which had diminished the fortunes of Jean Patou's wealthy American clientele. Despite its elevated price and the depressed economic environment, Joy became a success and has remained Jean Patou's most famous fragrance. Patou was acquired by Procter & Gamble in 2001. In 2002, Patou launched Enjoy, a contemporary take on Joy meant for younger women.

In 2011 Patou was bought by Designer Parfums Ltd, a UK-based firm. In August 2018, LVMH purchased Patou and Dior, an LVMH brand, acquired the rights to the name "Joy". In August 2018, Dior launched a perfume named Joy.

== Composition ==
Joy is composed primarily of a combination of jasmine and rose; 10,000 jasmine flowers and 28 dozen roses are required to create 30ml of the parfum, contributing to its high retail price. Joy also contains other flowers such as ylang ylang, champak, and tuberose. Given its many ingredients, Joy does not smell like a specific flower. According to Luca Turin, "the whole point of its formula was to achieve the platonic idea of a flower, not one particular earthly manifestation." The original bottle, designed by French architect and artisan Louis Süe, was designed to have a simple, classical feel.

== Awards ==
"Joy" was voted "Scent of the Century" by the public at the Fragrance Foundation FiFi Awards in 2000, beating its rival "Chanel No. 5".

Joy is preserved in its original 1930 formulation in the archives of the Osmothèque, donated to the collection by Jean Kerléo, formerly head perfumer at Jean Patou.
