= Yuri Gutsatz =

Russian-born French perfumer

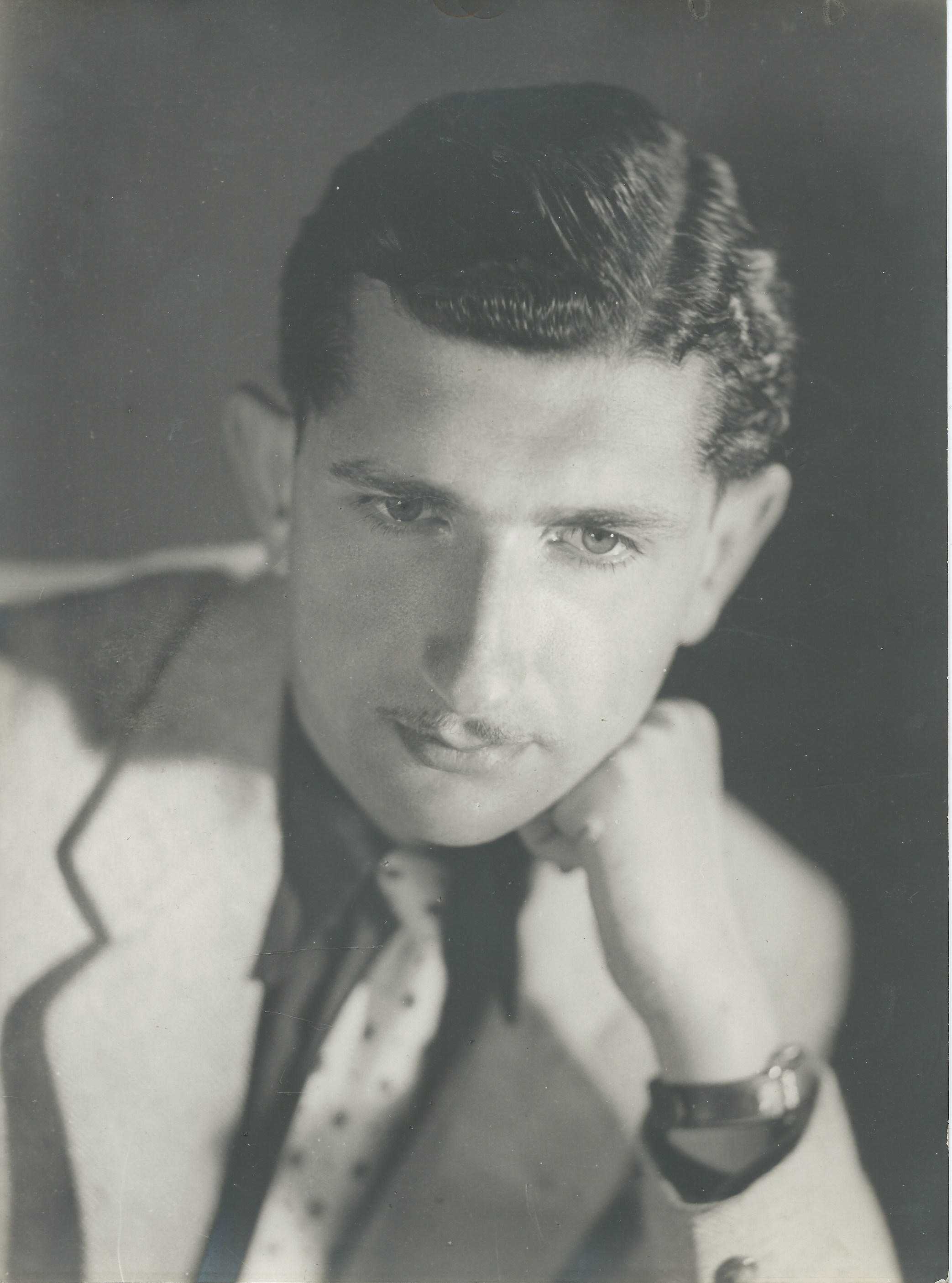
- Born: July 6, 1914
- Died: April 7, 2005 (aged 90); France
- Occupation: Perfumer
- Employer(s): Parfumerie de Mury, Roure-Bertrand et Le Jardin Retrouvé
- Known for: Perfumery

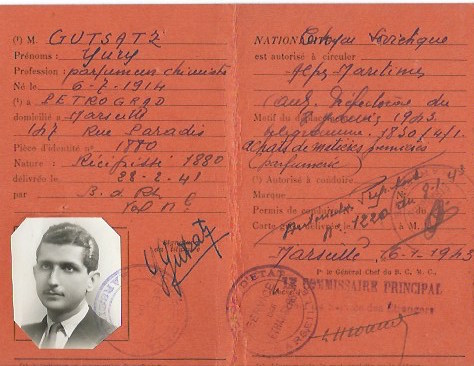
Yuri Gutsatz legal paper authorizing him to go from Marseille to Grasse to visit perfume houses (WWII)

Yuri Gutsatz (born July 6, 1914, in St. Petersburg, Russia, died April 7, 2005, in Paris, France) was a perfumer. He emigrated to Berlin in 1924 and then to Paris in 1933 where he worked for the Parfums de Mury. After the Second World War, he was hired by Louis Amic at Roure Bertrand Fils and Justin Dupont (later merged in Givaudan). As a perfumer, he created many perfumes like Carven Chasse Gardée in 1950. and PM of Mary Quant. He participated in perfume projects for Ungaro and Estee Lauder as well as for Cartier, Dior and Van Cleef & Arpels. On December 12, 1975, he registered the trademark Le Jardin Retrouve and founded the first niche perfume house, a few months before the I'Artisan Parfumeur (1976). Yuri Gutsatz was also a perfume critic and vice president of the Société Française des Parfumeurs, and one of the founders of Osmothèque- the perfume conservatory-, in 1990 with Jean Kerleo.

== Biography ==
Fleeing the Russian Revolution of 1917, Yuri Gutsatz left Saint Petersburg for Berlin in 1924 before emigrating to Paris in 1933, where he joined Parfums de Mury. This company had bought the perfumes created by Paul Poiret. They asked Yuri Gutsatz to modernize 40 of the brand's fragrances, but when World War II begun, Yuri joined the Foreign Legion and the project never saw the light of the day. Three years later, Yuri Gutsatz was working in the free zone for the Société Française de Parfumerie in Marseille. He was then offered training in perfumery by Chiris, in Grasse, under the direction of Édouard Hache.

In 1945, he returned to Paris where he became Chief Perfumer at Roure Bertrand Fils et Justin Dupont, working with Louis Amic, the inventor of modern perfumery and owner of the company. Seven years later, in 1952, Maurice Lehmann, then director of the Paris Opera, gave him the task of perfuming the theater during Act 3 of Rameau's Indes Galantes (Ballet des Roses). The opera had a 3-year run in Paris.

In 1956, Yuri Gutsatz was sent by his employer to Bombay to set up a production factory for perfume ingredients in association with the Tata Group, for its perfumery wing, Industrial Perfumes. He lived in Bombay for six years after which he returned to France. At that period, he created the perfumes for its then subsidiary, the Lakmé brand, which was headed by Simone Tata.

Upon his return, he perceived the major changes that had taken place in the perfumery industry of the 1960s: the perfumer and his creativity were muzzled by the all-powerful marketing apparatus. The perfumer as an identity was no longer recognised, in contrast to the traditions of perfumery creation that existed between the 1920s and 1950s, that saw the development of the role of perfumers such as Ernest Beaux and Germaine Cellier. Yuri published several articles on this subject in the Bulletin of the Société Technique des Parfumeurs de France (which subsequently became La Société Française des Parfumeurs), among them is "Perfumer, your name is nobody" and in various other journals. Yuri Gutsatz decided to quit Roure, and registered his own brand, Le Jardin Retrouvé, on 12 December 1975.

The very first Niche Perfumery House was born. He conceived it as an articulation of his concepts on perfumery, creating perfumes of quality at affordable prices, using only the best raw materials available. Among the precursors of niche perfumery was also Jean Laporte, who founded the brand L'Artisan Parfumeur in 1976.

Yuri Gutsatz was named the editor of the Bulletin of La Société Française des Parfumeurs in 1976. He was also a perfume critic - the very first in the profession. In the inaugural issue, he wrote an article entitled "Maison rêvée de la parfumerie" (a dream house of perfumery), making him one of the originators of the Osmothèque. Yuri Gutsatz held the position of vice president of La Société Française des Parfumeurs from 1978 to 1986. In 1990, he participated in the classification of perfumes and the founding of the Osmothèque.

He died in Paris on 7 April 2005.
