= Chanel No. 19 =

Chanel perfume

No. 19

Fragrance by Henri Robert
- Released: 1971
- Label: Chanel

Chanel No. 19 perfume was first marketed in 1971. The number 19 was chosen to commemorate Coco Chanel's birthday, 19 August. The perfume was launched a year before she died. The scent was created by Henri Robert.

Coco Chanel

No. 19 is a balsamic-green scent, compared to the aldehydic Chanel No. 5, the floral Chanel No. 22 and ambrette-green Chanel No. 18. The pure perfume and eau de parfum have a slight greenish tint, and the eau de toilette is pale green.

In a recent revamp of No. 19, Chanel has drastically reduced the products available: the original splash bottles and refillable sprays of Eau de Toilette and Eau de Parfum have been discontinued, as have the two sizes of refillable Parfum spray. The range of bath and body products, which was previously identical to the comprehensive range available in No. 5, has been discontinued.

In a number of reviews, Bel Respiro (a 2006 Eau de Toilette from Chanel's Les Exclusifs range) is described having a certain similarity to No. 19, especially in its top notes.

== Notes ==
Chanel No. 19 contains fragrant notes of galbanum, neroli, bergamot, jasmine, rose, lily of the valley, iris, vetiver, sandalwood, leather and musk. The galbanum and leather on a musky base makes the scent very difficult to classify. Some call it a green floral, others a chypre. The different foci of each concentration (eau de cologne, eau de toilette, eau de parfum, parfum/extrait) also make classification difficult. The current EdP, for example, has a softer floral character, while the classic parfum and extrait are much darker, leathery chypres. Chanel announced the scent "Audacious and assertive. Never conventional".. During the 1970s and 1980s, Chanel No. 19 was advertised with the slogans "The Unexpected Chanel", "The Outspoken Chanel" and "Devastatingly Feminine".

Number 19 Eau de Parfum is a floral-woody-green fragrance, a white and green floral harmony.

== Chanel No. 19 Poudré ==
In 2011 Chanel introduced a flanker to No. 19 called No. 19 Poudré. Jacques Polge, Chanel's house perfumer, is credited with creating No. 19 Poudré. The Eau de Parfum is described by Chanel as "A bold re-imagining of Coco Chanel's signature scent" and describes it as including neroli, galbanum, jasmine, iris, white musk, vetiver, and tonka bean.

In No. 19 Poudré, the sharp galbanum and aldehydes of the original are dialed back, and sweeter neroli and iris take their place. The iris is described as lush and fruity, and despite the fragrance's name, less powdery than the iris in No. 19. Nowadays Chanel No. 19 Poudré comes only in 100mL Eau de Parfum.
