= Bluegrass =

Bluegrass or Blue Grass may refer to:

== Plants ==
- Bluegrass (grass), several species of grasses of the genus Poa
  - Kentucky bluegrass (Poa pratensis), one well-known species of the genus

== Arts and media ==
- Bluegrass music, a form of American roots music
- Bluegrass Films, an independent film studio based in Los Angeles

== Places ==
- Blue Grass, Iowa, a city in the United States
- Blue Grass, Minnesota, an unincorporated settlement in the United States
- Blue Grass, Virginia, an unincorporated settlement in the United States
- Bluegrass region, a geographic region in the US state of Kentucky
- Blue Grass Airport, an airport in Fayette county, Kentucky

== Other uses ==
- Blue Grass, a 1915 film with Thomas A. Wise
- Blue Grass Army Depot, a munitions storage depot in Richmond, Kentucky
- Blue Grass, a brand name used by Belknap Hardware and Manufacturing Company
- Blue Grass (fragrance) by Elizabeth Arden
- Bluegrass, a passenger train of the Monon Railroad
