= Université Européenne des Senteurs & Saveurs =

Université Européenne des Senteurs & Saveurs (UESS)
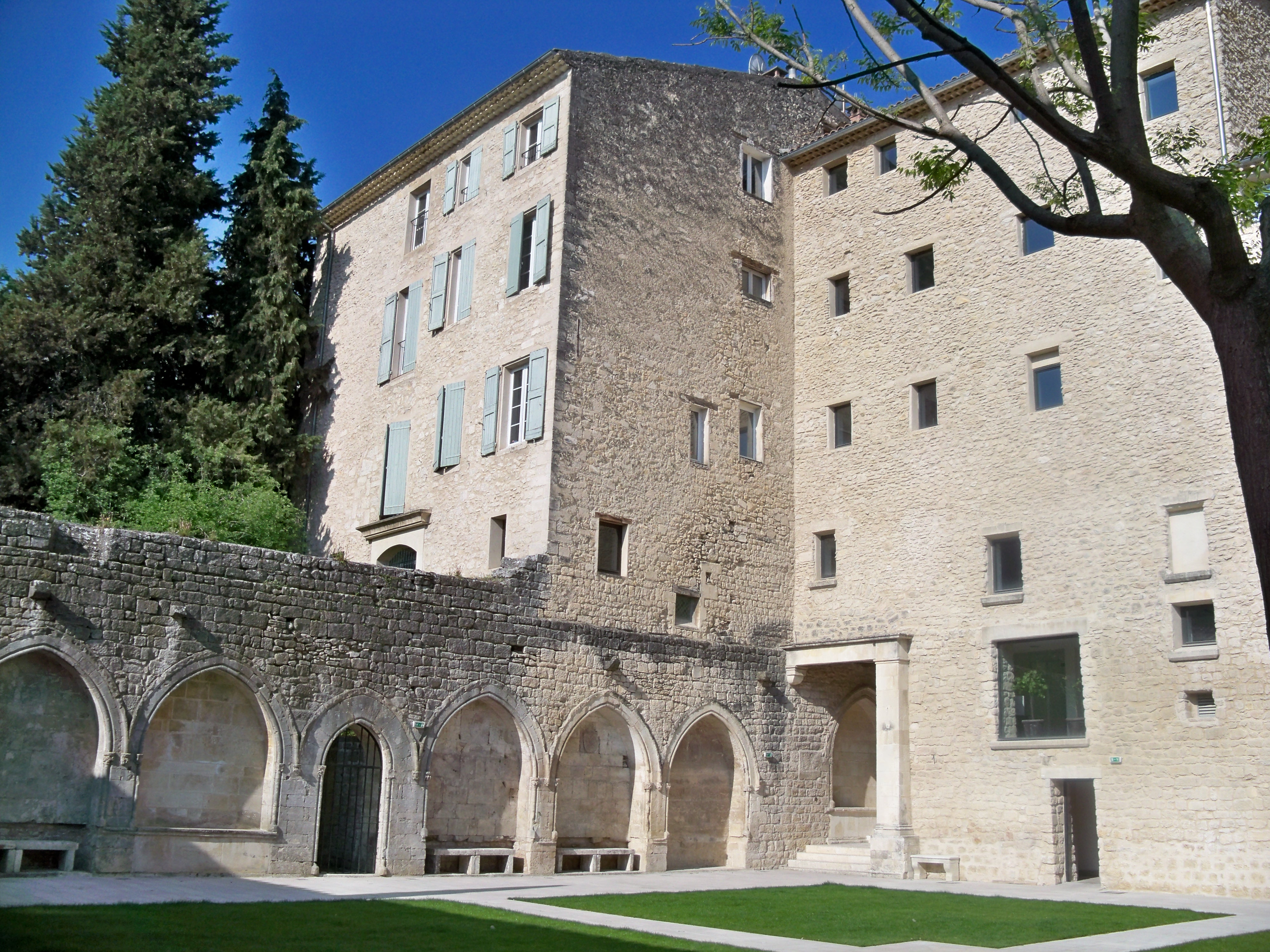
- Type: Private
- Established: 2003; 23 years ago
- Affiliations: Aix-Marseille University
- President: Alain Robert
- Students: 240
- Location: Forcalquier, Provence-Alpes-Côte d'Azur, France; 43.9592°N 5.7821°E
- Campus: Urban
- Website: UESS.fr

The Université Européenne des Senteurs et des Saveurs (UESS) (English: European University of Fragrances and Flavors), located at the medieval Couvent des Cordeliers in Forcalquier, France, is a private university specializing in the study of natural aroma compounds, cosmetics and flavorings. Founded in 2003 by entrepreneur Jacques Bardouin, the university is distinct among perfumery schools in that its teaching focuses exclusively upon raw materials of natural extraction, often those produced locally. The institution offers a wide range of academic programs, from vocational training in agriculture and cosmetics to undergraduate and graduate degrees in business and science, taught in conjunction with Aix-Marseille Université. Also held on campus are workshops in perfumery and aromatherapy for professionals and amateurs alike. For the general public, the university frequently organizes exhibitions on the subject of scent, both at the Couvent des Cordeliers and abroad, partnering with the Osmothèque at venues including the Carrousel du Louvre and the Palais-Royal in Paris.

== See also ==
- Education in France
- Flavorist
- ISIPCA
- Perfumer
- Provence
