= Patricia de Nicolaï =

French perfumer (born 1957)

- Born: 5 December 1957 (age 68); Paris, France
- Occupation: Perfumer
- Known for: Perfumer; First Female President of the Osmothèque; Grand-daughter of Pierre Guerlain
- Spouse: Jean-Louis Michau
- Children: Axel de Nicolaï +1
- Awards: 1988 International prize for Young Perfumers (Prix International du jeune Parfumeur Créateur); 2008 Legion of Honour (Chevalier de la Légion d'Honneur)

Patricia de Nicolaï is a French perfumer who works as the head of her own perfume company Nicolaï Paris. She is also a member of the technical committee of the French Society of Perfumers and the president of the Osmothèque scent archive.

== Early life and education ==
Patricia de Nicolaï was born in Paris, France into the Guerlain perfumer family and is the great-granddaughter of Pierre Guerlain and niece of Jean-Paul Guerlain. After studying chemistry in university, de Nicolai entered and studied at ISIPCA, the renowned school of perfumery in Versailles.

== Career ==
Even with a degree as junior perfumer, de Nicolaï was faced with gender discrimination by the perfume industry of the time as she began her search for employment. With the help of her uncle Jean-Paul Guerlain, she was able to start working first at Florasynth (1982–1984) and then Quest International (1984–1989), where in the latter she worked on the Lancôme Trésor perfume (1990) with Sophia Grojsman. Following in the long family tradition, she eventually launched her own perfume company (brand: "Nicolaï Paris") in 1998 with her husband Jean-Louis Michau, where in the opinion of some she created some of the best works in contemporary perfumery, and is noted by Luca Turin as being "...one of the unsung greats of the fragrance world."

Although believed by some to be a candidate for the position of Guerlain's in-house perfumer, the presence of a glass ceiling in the company prevented her selection for position since: "The family who worked in the brand was only men, no women." Thierry Wasser was eventually chosen in 2008 as the in-house perfumer of Guerlain.

Since 2008, Patricia de Nicolaï became the president of the Osmothèque, the esteemed French perfume archive, with the position handed over by its founder Jean Kerléo.

Some of the more notable perfumes released by Nicolaï Paris are Rose Pivoine (1998), Fig-Tea (2007), Patchouli Intense (2009), Vanille Tonka (2010), Amber Oud (2013).

== Awards and honors ==
- 1988 International prize for Young Perfumers (Prix International du jeune Parfumeur Créateur - Société Française des Parfumeurs): For her fragrance Number One, of which she is the first woman laureate.
- 2008 Legion of Honour (Chevalier de la Légion d'Honneur): Decorated as a knight in the French Legion of Honour
