= Rallet =

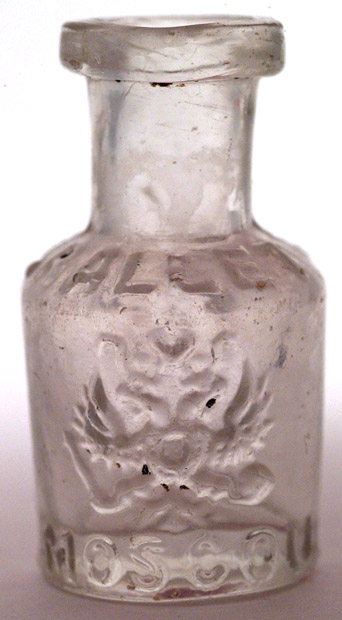
Rallet Perfume Bottle Showing Romanov Double Eagle

Rallet (founded 1843) was a perfume, soap, and cosmetics manufacturer in Moscow. The company was an official supplier to the royal courts of Russia, Persia, and Montenegro. In 1896, Rallet was purchased by Chiris of Grasse, France. When Rallet's Russian assets were nationalized in 1917, the company was reestablished in France. In 1920, Rallet's technical director, Ernest Beaux, created a series of perfumes for Gabrielle Chanel, one of which was No.5. In 1926, Rallet was sold to François Coty.

== Alphonse Rallet ==
Born in Castle-Thierry, Alphonse Rallet (1819–1894), was the youngest of seven children born to Antoine (1771–1857) and Marie-Louise (Marry) Rallet.

In 1842, Rallet traveled to Moscow and in the spring of 1843 established a soap and perfume works at 47 Vyatskaya Street, initially employing about 40 workers. Rallet was joined in Moscow by his older brother, Eugene (1814–1865), a professor of French literature who initially sought to pursue a teaching career but ultimately joined his younger brother in the soap and perfume enterprise.

In Moscow, the brothers meet Emile Baudrand, a trader, also from France. Baudrand was married to a woman from the Dauphine region of France near Grenoble and through Baudrand Alphonse Rallet made the acquaintance of Mathilde Farconet, daughter of Frederic (1807–1863) and Mathilde Farconet, whom he married in 1854. Farconet, a republican lawyer, had become provisional mayor of Grenoble in 1848 and served for several years before political changes caused him to retire from office.

In 1855, Rallet's only child, Olga, was born in Moscow. In 1856, having secured his fortune in Russia but suffering from lung problems, Rallet returned to France with his wife and daughter and began work on the restoration of the Château Servien at Biviers which he had purchased at the time of his marriage. From 1865 to 1888, Rallet served as mayor of Biviers.

Eugene Rallet later married Lėonie Farconet, sister of Mathilde.

In time, Olga Rallet, married Augustin Blanchet of the family of bank paper makers. She died in 1888 giving birth to her eighth child.

In 1857, Alphonse Rallet, Emile Baudrand, and Napoleon Nayral join Joseph Vicat (1821–1902) to capitalize cements Vicat, Rallet supplying 25 percent of the capital.

Blind for the last ten years of his life, Alphonse Rallet died in 1894 and is buried in Biviers.

== Perfume for Imperial Russia ==
In the early summer of 1843, Alphonse Rallet established a business at 47 Vyatskaya Street in Moscow to manufacture stearin candles. The factory was equipped with a single steam engine and employed 40 workers. He was joined by his older brother, Eugene. In 1818 stearin, often produced from palm oil, had been discovered to be a particularly suitable wax for candles as it produced minimal soot and retained its shape at higher temperatures. In Moscow the brothers met Emile Baudrand, a trader, also from France, who would become a Rallet business associate.

By 1855, manufacturing was being carried out in 22 wooden buildings on "warm lane" (Теплом переулке) in the Zamoskvoretsky district. Perfumers had been hired from France and raw materials were being sourced from France and Italy. In addition to candles, Rallet was now producing perfumes, colognes, soaps, powders, and lipsticks.

In 1855, Rallet achieved the prestigious title of Supplier of the Imperial Russian Household. In this same year The Trading House of Rallet also became owner of the Crystal Factory of Frederick Dyutfua, giving Rallet, for the first time, the capability of manufacturing their own original bottles decanters. Dyutfua, in turn, became a joint owner and Rallet shareholder.

In 1856, having lung problems, Alphonse Rallet sold the business and returned to France with his wife and infant daughter. The buyers were a group of investors that included Bodranu Byuzhonu and the purchase was made with the condition that the company would continue to bear the Rallet name. The company was now reorganized as "A. Rallet & Co.," the name which would appear on all Rallet bottles and advertising.

In 1898, the company was acquired by Chiris, the large Grassois fragrance house founded by Antoine Chiris in 1768.

During the last half of the 19th century, Rallet continued to expand. Dependence on foreign suppliers was reduced through the acquisition of plantations in southern Russia for the cultivation of aromatic crops. A new factory was planned at Butyrskaya under the direction of the celebrated architect Oscar-Jean (Franzevich) DiDio. Completed in 1899, this factory featured the latest technology including steam engines, electricity, an elevator, and telephone service.

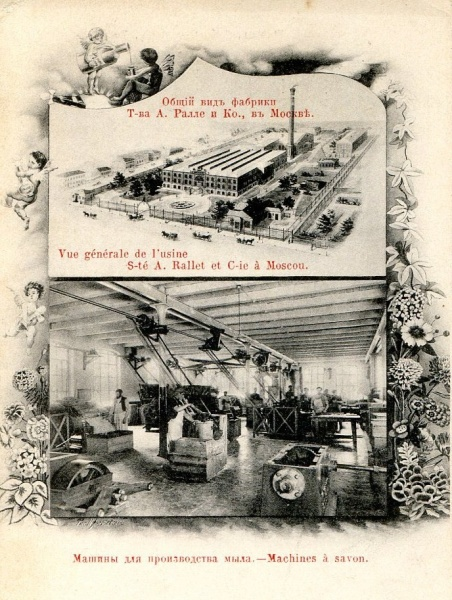
Late 19th century advertising card showing Rallet factory (top) and the interior of the soap works (below)

During the last 20 years of the 19th century, Rallet made huge profits from the sale of fashionable colognes. At some time during this period, Edward (Edwardovich) Beaux, a member of the board of directors, became Deputy Administrator of the company. Edward (Edwardovich) Beaux had previously served as a clerk for the trading company of Muir and Merrilees. In 1898 his younger brother, Ernest, joined the company as a lab assistant. In the late 19th century, A. Lemercier, a very original perfumer with an interest in all things modern including the new products of aroma chemistry, became Rallet's technical director. Yet, of perfumery technology in 1898, Ernest Beaux would later say, "perfumery consisted above all of preparing and mixing a small number of materials."

In December 1896, the company was reorganized with a basic capital of 1 million rubles. By 1903, capital had risen to 1.5 million rubles with net profit of around 75,000 rubles. By 1913, capital had reached 2,000,250 rubles and revenue estimated at 180,022 rubles.

By the early 20th century, Rallet was offering around 1,500 products and had three retail shops in Moscow and a wholesale business in St. Petersburgh. Shipments were made regularly by rail throughout Russia and also to China, Persia, and the Balkans.

== Prizes and awards ==
Starting around 1855, when Rallet became an official supplier to the Imperial Court of Russia, the company achieved a number of distinctions for its products. Rallet later became official supplier to the courts of Persia and Montenegro. The company was awarded the state emblem of the Russian Empire four times, a very unusual distinction.

In 1878, at the Paris World's Fair, Rallet received high awards.

In 1900, at the Paris Exhibition, Rallet was awarded the Grand Prix.

== Bouquet de Catherine ==
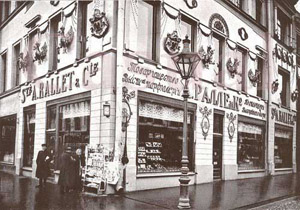
One of three Rallet retail shops in Moscow, pre-1917

In 1912, Rallet scored a major success with its Le Bouquet de Napoleon, a fragrance launched with great fanfare to commemorate the centenary of the Battle of Borodino, Napoleon's last victory in his failed Russian campaign. The fragrance was the creation of Rallet's technical director, perfumer Ernest Beaux.

In the same year, Houbigant introduced Quelques Fleurs, created by perfumer Robert Bienaimė. Quelques Fleurs was novel in its use of aldehyde C-12 MNA (2-methyl undecanal) which had been synthesized by Georges Darzens in 1903. The inclusion of aldehyde C-12 MNA gave Quelques Fleurs a "modern" feeling which fascinated a number of Bienaime's young contemporaries including Chiris perfumers Vincent Roubert, Henri Alméras, and Henri Roubert, and Rallet's somewhat older Ernest Beaux.

The following year Rallet introduced the Bouquet de Catherine honoring Catherine the Great and the tercentenary of the Romanov dynasty. Again the perfumer was Ernest Beaux.

Prewar examples of this fragrance no longer exist but it is believed that Bouquet de Catherine is close to or identical with to Rallet's post-war perfume, Le No.1. When an early sample of Le No.1 was subjected to GC-chromatography and GC-olfactometry analysis in 2007, Le No.1 was found to make use of an aldehyde "cocktail" similar to that found in Chanel's No.5, also an Ernest Beaux creation. The claim has been made by Marcel Carles, former director of the Roure perfumery school at Grasse, that Chanel's No.5 was developed from Bouquet de Catherine.

== Nationalization & Soviet era ==
In 1917, A. Rallet & Co. was nationalized by the new Soviet government and renamed "Soap and Perfume Works No.7." [Or No.4 - accounts vary.] Operations were merged with its former chief competitor, Brocard, the former Rallet factories were directed to produce only soap.

Brocard, the soap and perfume works established by Frenchman Henri Brocard in Moscow in 1861, had been renamed upon nationalization, "Soap and Perfume Works No. 5."

Dissatisfied with "number" names, the new managers petitioned the Council of People's Commissioners and in 1922, the former Rallet enterprise became "Svoboda" ("Freedom") and the former Brocard enterprise, "Nova Zayra" ("New Dawn").

The factories fell under the supervision of Polina Zhemchuzhina, wife of Vyacheslav Molotov, who become head of the Soviet Union's cosmetics trust in the 1920s, a position she would hold until 1932 when she incurred Joseph Stalin's displeasure at the time of his wife's suicide. In 1948, fluent in Yiddish, she acted as translator for a diplomatic meeting between her husband, Vyacheslav Molotov, the Soviet Union's foreign minister, and Golda Meir, foreign minister of the new state of Israel. Shortly afterward, she was exiled until after Stalin's death.

Nova Zayra continues to be a major cosmetics enterprise in post-Soviet Russia.

== Post-Soviet era ==
Svoboda, employing about 1,500 workers, is specialized in skin care products and soap. It is among the top ten cosmetics companies in Russia together with Procter & Gamble, L'Oreal, Gilette, Kalina, Schwarzkopf & Henkel, Unilever, Nevskaya Kosmetika, Colgate, and Beiersdorf. Like the majority of Russian cosmetics companies, Svoboda continues to be located in Moscow.

== Rallet in France ==
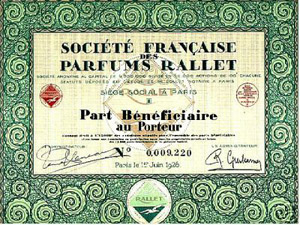
Rallet stock certificate dated June 1, 1926

After nationalization, Rallet's French staff regrouped at the main Chiris plant in La Bocca, France, where the company struggled to reestablish itself. They were joined by Ernest Beaux in 1919. By 1926, Ernest Beaux had left Rallet to become technical director for Chanel and Bourjois and Rallet was sold to Coty. A June 1, 1926 stock certificate shows the company's name as Société Française des Parfums Rallet.

The Rallet Corporation of America was chartered in Delaware in 1947 and Rallet fine fragrances were offered at least as late as 1948 but the company never regained its former prominence.
