= Henri Robert =

French perfumer (1899–1987)

Henri Robert (1899, Grasse – 1987) was a French perfumer and chemist, he is best known for his role as Chief Perfumer at Les Parfums Chanel from 1953 to 1978.

== Early life and career ==
Robert's father, Joseph Robert, was the Chief Perfumer at Chiris, who gave François Coty some of his first lessons, and developed the solvent extraction process that revolutionised how the perfumery industry produced raw materials. By 1919 the younger Robert was also working at Chiris alongside perfumers Vincent Roubert, Ernest Beaux and Henri Alméras.

He later joined Parfums d'Orsay, where his one of his most significant creations was the fragrance Le Dandy in 1923. Le Dandy was a fashionable floral aldehyde, which although marketed to men became a favourite with young women of the 1920s. Following François Coty's death in 1934 Robert became Chief Perfumer at Coty. In 1936 he created Muguet de Bois in tribute to François Coty, taking inspiration from Coty's custom of presenting his employees with bunches of lily of the valley, taken from the grounds of his country home, every May first. After the outbreak of World War II, Robert moved to New York City and continued to work as a Perfumer at Coty from 1940 to 1943.

In 1943 Henri Robert Inc. merged with the Albert Verley Company Inc., and Mr. Robert worked there for an unknown number of years before departing to Chanel.

Robert took over as Chief Perfumer at Les Parfums Chanel in 1952 after the retirement of Ernest Beaux, creator of the perfume Chanel No. 5. While at Les Parfums Chanel, which owned both Chanel and Bourjois, he created a number of modern classics including Pour Monsieur (1955) Chanel's first men's fragrance, No. 19 (1970) and Cristalle EDT (1974).

== Family ==
Henri Robert was the uncle of perfumer Guy Robert (1926-2012) and great-uncle of perfumer François Robert.

== Notable perfume creations ==
- 1925 – Le Dandy, Parfums D'Orsay
- 1936 – Le Muguet des Bois, Coty
- 1955 – Pour Monsieur, Chanel
- 1970 – No. 19, Chanel
- 1974 – Cristalle, Chanel
