= Pamela Low =

Food scientist

Pamela Low (March 16, 1928 – June 1, 2007) was an American flavorist, best known for developing and creating the flavor coating for the oatmeal breakfast cereal Cap'n Crunch.

== Biography ==
Pamela Low was the daughter of Kneeland West and Pauline (Smith) Low. She was born in Manchester, New Hampshire. She graduated from the Pinkerton Academy in 1946 and studied microbiology at the University of New Hampshire where she graduated in 1951. She went on to work as a flavorist for the Arthur D. Little consulting firm in the Boston metropolitan area.

She was reportedly asked to develop a flavor for the new Cap'n Crunch cereal in the early 1960s. Her inspiration for the flavor coating was rice with a sauce composed of butter and brown sugar that her grandmother, Luella Low, used to serve to her family on Sundays as a child in Derry. Cap'n Crunch was officially unveiled in 1963 and the original recipe has been unchanged since its launch. She is often referred to as the "Grandmother" of Cap'n Crunch. She also worked on the flavors for Almond Joy and Mounds candy bars while at Arthur D. Little, where she worked for 34 years.

Pamela Low lived in New London, New Hampshire since 1973. She was President of the Baptist Women's Fellowship from 1987 to 1988, and of the New London Hospital Auxiliary in 1992. In 1996, she established a scholarship at the University of New Hampshire for students in clinical microbiology. She was also the President of the Women's Golf League of the country club of New Hampshire

Pamela Low died at the New London Hospital in New London, New Hampshire on June 1, 2007 at the age of 79. She is buried at the Forest Hill Cemetery in East Derry, New Hampshire. Low never married nor did she have children.
