= Jean Kerléo =

French perfumer (1932–2025)

Kerléo on the Champs Elysées launching a new perfume

Jean Kerléo (French: [ʒɑ̃ kɛʁleo]; 24 February 1932 – 23 July 2025) was a French perfumer who worked in-house for Jean Patou and was also the founder of the Osmothèque, a scent archive in Versailles.

== Life and career ==
Kerléo was born on 24 February 1932 in Brittany, France. At age 22, he began making perfumes for a New York City company, Helena Rubinstein. He received the Prix des Parfumeurs de France in 1965, served as the president for the Society of French Perfumers from 1976 to 1979, and was awarded the Prix François COTY in 2001.

From 1967 until 1998, Kerléo was the in-house perfumer for the Patou, the second in line after Henri Alméras, where he composed the influential perfumes 1000 and Sublime. In 1999, he passed his position of head perfumer of Patou to Jean-Michel Duriez and became the director of the Osmothèque, which he co-founded. In this position, he supervised, researched, and extended the collection of this fragrance archive to encompass and reconstruct more ancient and lost perfumes. In 2008, he handed the position of president and director to Patricia de Nicolaï, the great-granddaughter of Pierre-François Pascal Guerlain.

Kerleo died on 23 July 2025, at the age of 93.

== Creations for Jean Patou ==
- Lacoste Eau de Sport (1967, for men; discontinued)
- 1000 (1972)
- Eau de Patou (1976)
- Patou pour Homme (1980, for men; discontinued)
- Ma Liberté (1987, discontinued)
- Sublime (1992)
- Patou pour Homme Privé (1994, for men; discontinued)
- Voyageur (1995)

In 1984, Kerléo was responsible for the recreation of 12 iconic Patou fragrances of the early decades: Amour-Amour, Que sais-je, Adieu Sagesse, Chaldée, Moment Suprême, Cocktail, Divine Folie, Normandie, Vacances, Colony, L'Heure Attendue, and Câline. Very much in the spirit of his later work at the Osmothèque, he restricted himself to those fragrances he could confidently reassemble based on existing formulas and available ingredients, avoiding guesswork where such reference material was not available. For this reason, many classic Patou fragrances were not recreated.
