= Cap'n Crunch =

American breakfast cereal made by the Quaker Oats Company

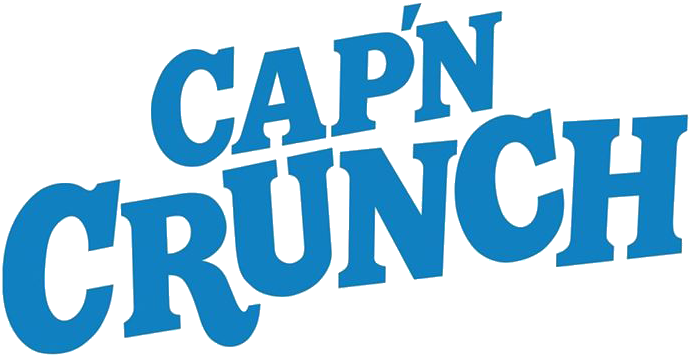

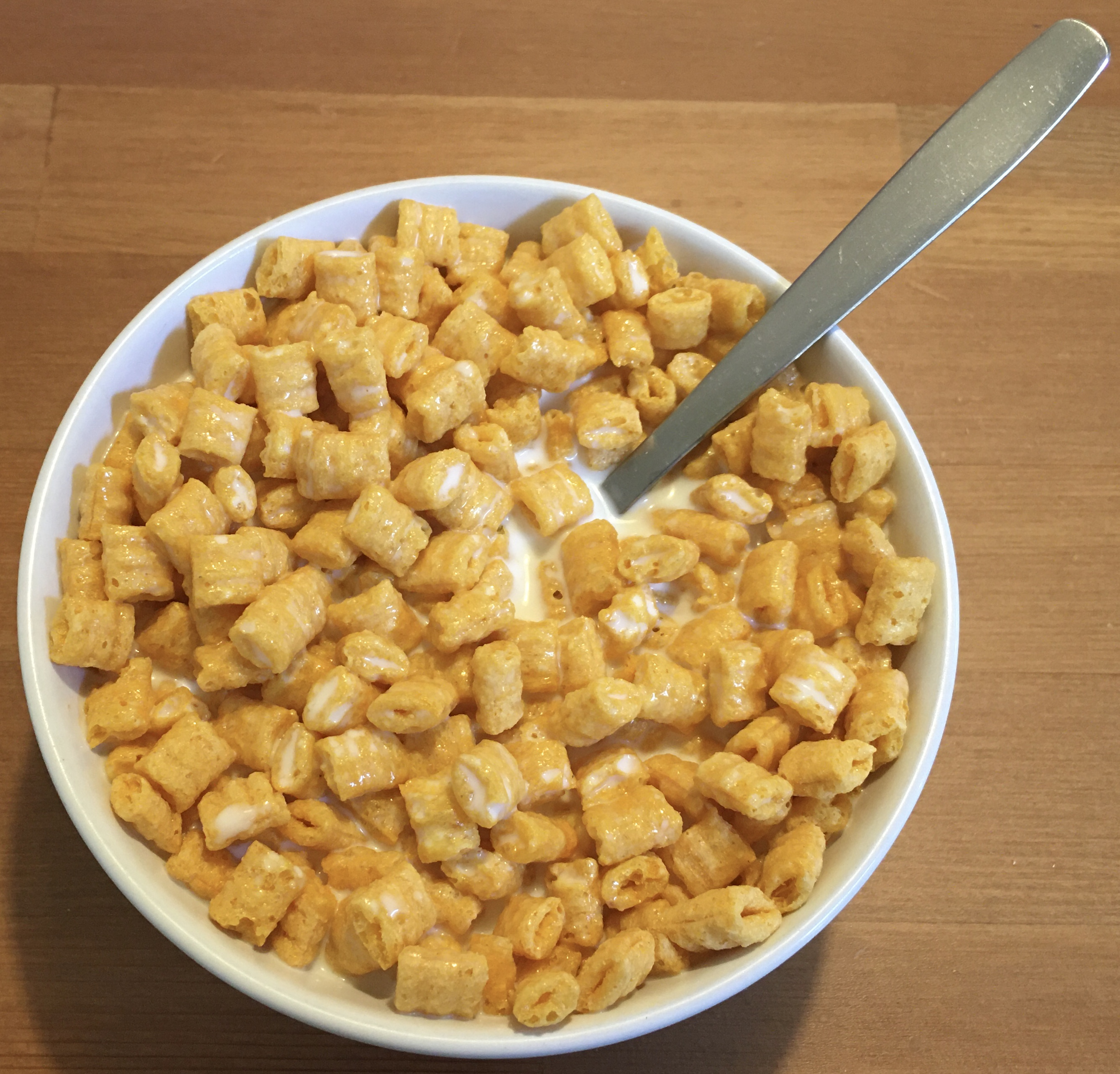
- Cap'N Crunch – Sweetened Corn & Oat Cereal, with milk
- Product type: Breakfast cereal
- Current owner: Quaker Oats Company
- Country: United States
- Introduced: 1963; 63 years ago
- Website: capncrunch.com

Cap'n Crunch is a corn and oat breakfast cereal manufactured since 1963 by Quaker Oats Company, a subsidiary of PepsiCo since 2001. Since the original product introduction, marketed simply as Cap'n Crunch, Quaker Oats has introduced numerous flavors and seasonal variations, some for a limited time—and currently offers a Cap'n Crunch product line.

The original Cap'n Crunch cereal was developed to recall a recipe of brown sugar and butter over rice. It was one of the first cereals to use an oil coating to deliver its flavoring, which required an innovative baking process.

== Product history ==
Grandma would like to make this concoction with rice and the sauce that she had; it was a combination of brown sugar and butter. It tasted good, obviously. They'd put it over the rice and eat it as a kind of a treat on Sundays ...

— William Low, Pamela Low's brother

Pamela Low, a flavorist at Arthur D. Little, developed the original Cap'n Crunch flavor in 1963—recalling a recipe of a mixture of brown sugar and butter her grandmother Luella Low served over rice at her home in Derry, New Hampshire.

Low created the flavor coating for Cap'n Crunch, describing it as giving the cereal a quality she called "want-more-ishness". After her death in 2007, The Boston Globe called Low "the mother of Cap'n Crunch". At Arthur D. Little, Low had also worked on the flavors for Heath, Mounds and Almond Joy candy bars.

In 1965, the Quaker Oats Company awarded the Fredus N. Peters Award to Robert Rountree Reinhart Sr. for his leadership in directing the development team of Cap'n Crunch. Reinhart developed a technique in the manufacture of Cap'n Crunch, using oil in its recipe as a flavor delivery mechanism—which initially made the cereal difficult to bake properly.

== Marketing ==
Quaker Oats had a marketing plan for Cap'n Crunch, before it had developed the cereal. The product line is heralded by a cartoon mascot of the same name.

The character was created by Allan Burns, who became known for co-creating The Munsters and The Mary Tyler Moore Show. The commercials themselves were originally produced by Jay Ward Productions.

Cap'n Crunch is depicted as a late 18th-century naval captain, an elderly gentleman with white eyebrows and a white moustache, who wears a Revolutionary-style naval uniform: a bicorne hat emblazoned with a "C" and a gold-epauletted blue coat with gold bars on the sleeves. While typically an American naval captain wears four bars on his sleeves, the mascot has been variously depicted over the years wearing only one bar (ensign), two bars (lieutenant), or three bars (commander). As of May 26, 2024, he is now depicted on cereal boxes with the four bars of a naval captain. Voice actor Daws Butler created Cap'n Crunch's voice, basing it on that of Hollywood and radio character actor Charles Butterworth.

Animated television commercials featured the adventures of Cap'n Crunch commanding the "good ship" Guppy on its sea voyages accompanied by his canine first mate Seadog and loyal crew of sailor children named Alfie, Dave, Brunhilde, and Carlyle. Jean LaFoote, "The Barefoot Pirate", often attacked the Guppy in order to steal its cargo of Cap'n Crunch cereal.

According to The Wall Street Journal (2013), the character, Horatio Magellan Crunch, was born on Crunch Island, a magical island in the Sea of Milk—with talking trees, crazy creatures and a mountain (Mt. Crunchmore) made out of Cap'n Crunch cereal." The article refers to the Captain's bicorne as a "Napoleon-style" hat, and claims that this has led to speculation that he may be French.

Cap'n Crunch's original animated television commercials used the slogan, "It's got corn for crunch, oats for punch, and it stays crunchy, even in milk." Later slogans included "Love that crunch" and "Crunch-atize me, Cap'n".

In 2013, sources including The Wall Street Journal and Washington Times noted that the three stripes on the mascot's uniform indicate a rank of Commander rather than the four that denote the rank of Captain. In jest, The Wall Street Journal reported that the U.S. Navy had no record of Crunch and that the Naval Criminal Investigative Service (NCIS) was investigating him for impersonating a naval officer.

Daws Butler provided the original voice of the Cap'n until his death in 1988. From 1991 to 2007, George J. Adams voiced him, followed by John Gegenhuber in The Cap'n Crunch Show in 2013, and Mike Stoudt since 2021.

In the 1960s Cap'n Crunch cereal boxes came with whistles which coincidentally had the specific frequency (2600 hertz) required to exploit a vulnerability of in-band signaling enabling a phone to make free calls by entering an 'operator mode'. This was discovered by John Draper.

Vinton Studios produced a claymation ad during the 1980s.

A CD-ROM game called Cap'n Crunch's Crunchling Adventure was produced in 1999 to pack into cereal boxes.

=== Brand characters ===
Jean LaFoote is a fictional pirate character from the Cap'n Crunch breakfast cereal's character set. The character's name is wordplay on that of the historical pirate, Jean Lafitte. In the mid-1970s, he was the primary mascot for Jean LaFoote's Cinnamon Crunch cereal. LaFoote was originally voiced by Bill Scott, followed by Adam Shapiro from 2006 to 2007, Joe Nipote in The Cap'n Crunch Show in 2013, and Isaac Robinson-Smith since 2024.

In the 1980s, the Captain's main adversaries were the Soggies, strange alien creatures resembling blobs of milk, whose goal was to make everything on Earth soggy. The only thing that was immune was Cap'n Crunch cereal, and many ads revolved around their attempts to "soggify" the cereal and everything else, to no avail. Their leader, Squish the Sogmaster (voiced by Dick Gautier), was a large mechanical creature (with a pair of eyes peeking out from an opening in the head) who was mostly seen ordering the Soggies to carry out his plans to "ruin breakfast"; several commercials that tied in with contests had story arcs involving the Sogmaster attempting to capture Cap'n Crunch.

== Variations ==
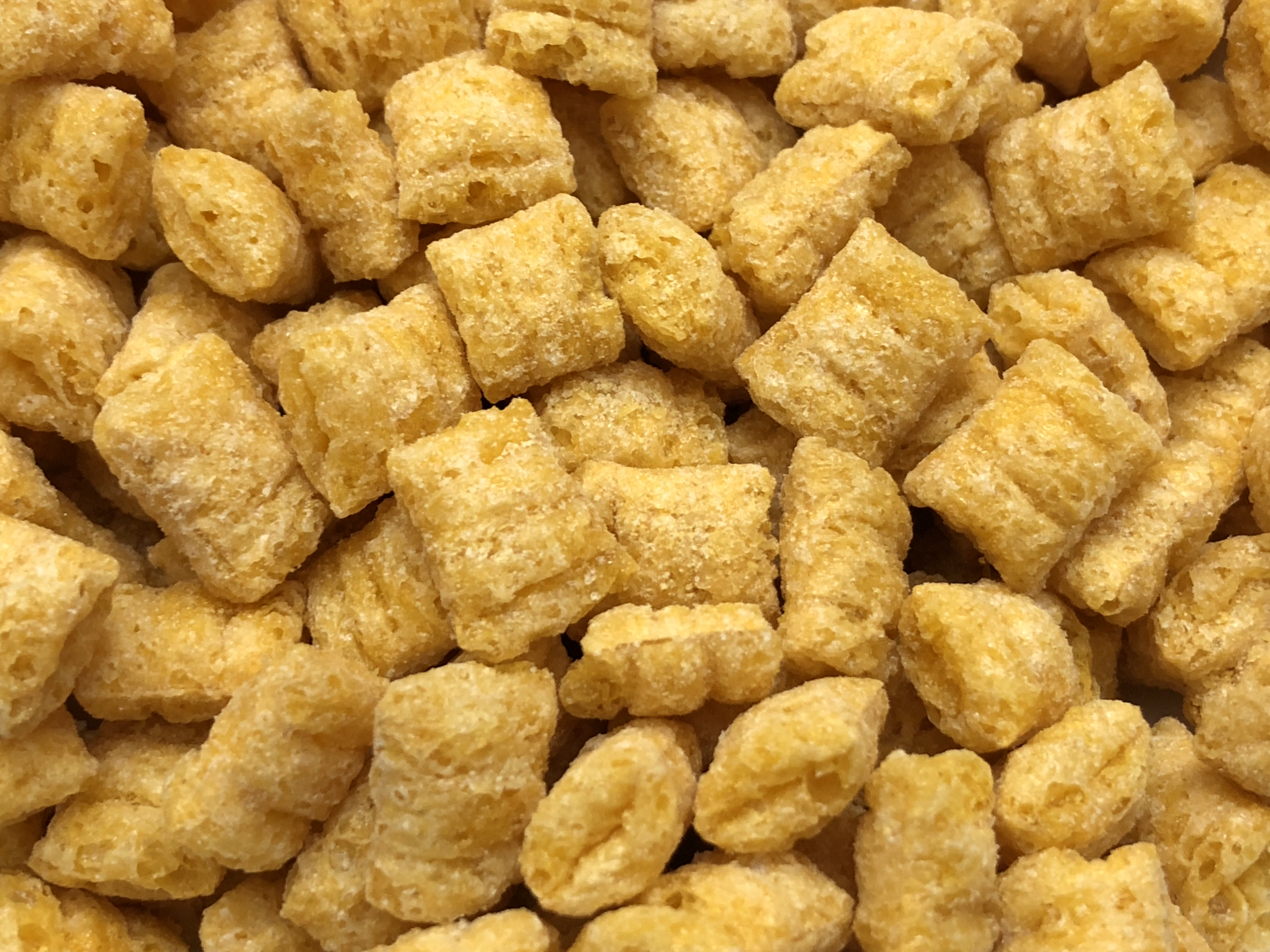
Cap'n Crunch cereal (original flavor)

- Cap'n Crunch: The original Cap'n Crunch cereal is made of sweetened, yellow, square-shaped cereal pieces made by combining corn and oats. The cereal was launched in 1963, bolstered by a successful advertising campaign created by noted animator Jay Ward and introducing the cereal's longtime naval mascot, Cap'n Crunch.
- Cap'n Crunch's Crunch Berries: Cap'n Crunch's Crunch Berries cereal was introduced in 1967 and contained, in addition to the yellow pieces found in the original Cap'n Crunch, spherical red Crunch Berry pieces. A version of Crunch Berries briefly available had three small berries in a cluster rather than spherical berries. The Crunch Berry Beast mascot was introduced alongside the cereal. There are currently four Crunch Berry colors: red, green (introduced in 2002), blue, and purple (both introduced in the '90s). All the berry pieces are flavored the same, regardless of color.
- Peanut Butter Crunch: First released in 1969, with a large elephant, Smedley, as its mascot. According to sales charts, this version was the most successful at the time. It consists of peanut butter-flavored corn puffs.
- Punch Crunch, Vanilly Crunch, Jean LaFoote's Cinnamon Crunch: Three more editions were issued in the early 1970s but later discontinued. Punch Crunch was fruit-flavored cereal rings (similar to the General Mills cereal Cheerios) introduced in 1973 and the mascot was a sailor suit-clad hippopotamus, Harry S. Hippo. Jean LaFoote's Cinnamon Crunch featured cinnamon-flavored cereal and was also introduced in 1973 (a reboot of this cereal, consisting of a cinnamon-flavored version of the original Cap'n Crunch pieces, was released in 2024). Vanilly Crunch was a vanilla-flavored cereal introduced in 1970 with Seadog as its former mascot, who was later replaced with Wilma the White Whale.
- Choco Crunch: In 1982, a variant called Choco Crunch was introduced. Featuring the mascot Chockle the Blob, this version contained the yellow corn squares plus chocolate-flavored Crunch Berries.
- Chocolatey Crunch: Consisting of chocolate-flavored corn squares, Chocolately Crunch was Introduced in 2011 and discontinued in July 2016 due to poor sales.
- Christmas Crunch (Holiday Crunch in Canada): First released for the 1987 Christmas holiday season, it contains the signature Cap'n Crunch yellow corn squares with red and green Crunch Berries. Currently, the Crunch Berries are shaped as Christmas-themed items (shapes vary yearly) and the cereal is packaged in a holiday-themed box with the Cap'n wearing a Santa Claus or winter-themed hat (box color and hat type vary yearly). When the cereal was introduced, the Crunch Berries were spherical-shaped and the cereal box contained a toy or Christmas tree ornament. On a few occasions, the cereal has been packaged with a packed-in food gimmick to add to the cereal, like Jingle Bell Rock pieces that changed the milk's color to red (used in the 1998 version) or sprinkled icing (used in the 1995 version).
- Deep Sea Crunch: A version of the cereal was introduced in 1993, which featured Crunch Berries shaped like sea creatures. This version was discontinued, but returned in 2009.
- Oops! All Berries: First released in 1997, "Oops! All Berries" contains only the berry-flavored Crunch Berries and none of the corn squares.
- Halloween Crunch: A limited-edition version of the cereal introduced in 2007, Halloween Crunch includes green Crunch Berries in the form of ghosts.
- Galactic Crunch: A discontinued version which featured space-related shaped marshmallows.
- Choco Donuts: A discontinued version which featured chocolate-flavored donut-shaped cereal rings with candy sprinkles.
- Home Run Crunch: A limited-edition version of the cereal was first released in 1995, which featured baseball-related shaped marshmallows, like home plates, caps and mitts. It has the flavor of Crunch Berries, but the pieces of cereal are shaped like bats and balls. It is occasionally reintroduced during the summer season, with the recent versions consisting of the original pieces with the bat and ball-shaped Crunch Berries.
- Neutron Berries featured spherical Crunch Berry pieces shaped like Jimmy Neutron, Goddard, Cindy and the Rocket. Released in 2001 to coincide with the film Jimmy Neutron: Boy Genius.
- Rugrats Go Wild Berries featured spherical Crunch Berry pieces shaped like Eliza, Spike, Chuckie and a Palm Tree which also turns milk blue. Released in 2003 to coincide with the film Rugrats Go Wild.
- Cap'n Crunch's Mystery Volcano Crunch: Red and yellow fruit-flavored Crunch Berries with "'free' packet of lava rocks that pop in milk!".
- Cap'n Crunch's Oops! Smashed Berries: "Oops! All Berries" cereal with flat Crunch Berries.
- Cap'n Crunch's CoZmic Crunch: Star-shaped Crunch Berries with "orange space dust that turns milk green".
- Polar Crunch: A version of the cereal in which the Crunch Berries change color to blue when milk is poured on them.
- Superman Crunch: Featured peanut butter pieces shaped like Superman's insignia's shield, which also turns milk blue. Released in 2006 to coincide with the film Superman Returns.
- Cinnamon Roll Crunch: Released in 2013.
- Cap'n Crunch's Crunch Treasures: Star-shaped crunchy yellow corn and oat rings. Contains half the sugar of regular Cap'n Crunch.
- Cap'n Crunch Bars: Later called Cap'n Crunch Treats, these were marshmallow treats similar to Rice Krispies Treats and came in Cap'n Crunch, Crunch Berries and Peanut Butter Crunch varieties.
- Airhead Berries: Released in 2003. A crossover between Airheads candy and Cap'n Crunch cereal.
- Cap'n Crunch's Sprinkled Donut Crunch: Released in 2014. Donut-flavored cereal rings with candy sprinkles.
- Cap'n Crunch's Orange Creampop Crunch: Modeled after nostalgic orange/vanilla ice pops.
- Cap'n Crunch's Blueberry Pancake Crunch: Released in 2016. Features blue, light blue and white corn and oat puffs with natural and artificial blueberry and maple syrup flavoring.
- Cap'n Crunch's Chocolatey Berry Crunch: Released in 2019. A Crunch Berries cereal with chocolate-flavored corn squares and red Crunch Berries.
- Cap'n Crunch's Strawberry Shortcake Crunch: Released in 2019. A Crunch Berries cereal with strawberry shortcake-flavored donut-shaped cereal pieces and red Crunch Berries.
- Cap'n Crunch's Red, White & Blue Crunch/Hero Crunch/Freedom Crunch: Released in 2019. A variant of Oops! All Berries cereal with red, white and blue Crunch Berries (the colors of the US flag.)
- Cotton Candy Crunch: Released in 2019. A variant of Oops! All Berries cereal with blue and pink Crunch Berries.
- Chocolate Caramel Crunch: Released in 2021. A variant featuring caramel-flavored squares and chocolate-flavored Crunch Berries.
- Canuck Crunch: Released in 2021, exclusively in Canada. A variant of Oops! All Berries cereal with red and white Crunch Berries (the colours of the Canadian flag).
- Sea Berry Crunch: Released in 2024. A variant of Oops! All Berries cereal with ocean blue Crunch Berries, with proceeds from US sales of this variant going to the non-profit organization Ocean Conservancy.
- Mystery Cherry Vanilla Crunch: Released in 2026. A variant featuring the regular Cap'n Crunch pieces flavored with cherry vanilla soda. It coincided with a third Where's The Cap'n? campaign first held in April 2026.

== See also ==
- List of breakfast cereal advertising characters
- List of breakfast cereals
