= Cuir de Russie =

Fragrance from Coco Chanel

Fragrance by Ernest Beaux
- Released: 1927
- Label: Chanel

Cuir de Russie (pronounced [kɥiʁ də ʁysi]) is a fragrance from Parisian couturier Gabrielle "Coco" Chanel. (The term may also refer to other Russia leather perfumes, most notably Creed Cuir de Russie.)

== History ==
Coco Chanel had worked with Ernest Beaux on her original perfume, Chanel No. 5, which debuted in 1921. In 1927, they released Cuir de Russie, which means "Russian leather" in French. In the 1920s, one of Chanel's lovers was Grand Duke Dmitri Pavlovich of Russia, the cousin of Tsar Nicholas II, and, according to Chanel's biographer Justine Picardie, Cuir de Russie was the "bottled ... essence of her romance with the Grand Duke."

== Notes ==
According to the Chanel website, the fragrance of Cuir de Russie is of "wild cavalcades, wafts of blond tobacco and the smell of boots tanned by birch bark, which the Russian soldiers would wear". The scent contains frankincense, juniper wood, mandarin orange, bergamot, rose, jasmine and ylang-ylang. The perfume is said to be gender-free, meant for all, with smoky, sandalwood, amber and a mix of leather.
