= Blue Grass (fragrance) =

1934 perfume by Elizabeth Arden

Fragrance by Elizabeth Arden, Inc.
- Category: Floral
- Designed for: Women
- Top notes: Primarily lavender
- Heart notes: Primarily jasmine and spicy notes
- Base notes: Benzoin, sandalwood, tonquin musk, tonka bean, vanilla
- Released: 1934
- Label: Elizabeth Arden, Inc.
- Perfumer(s): Henri Alméras
- Tagline: "A fresh, light floral bouquet"

Blue Grass is a floral fragrance that was released in 1934 by Elizabeth Arden, Inc. It was the first American perfume to find international success.

Elizabeth Graham, the founder of the Elizabeth Arden company, managed the cosmetics company and also was a Thoroughbred horse owner and breeder. On a visit to Grasse to find a new perfume to release, she sampled the fragrance's prototype and selected it. She launched it as Blue Grass in reference to Kentucky's bluegrass as well as the twilight at Grasse; a postcard from her featured a photo taken from the Fragonard factory in Grasse at twilight, with the title "The Legend of Blue Grass". A myth that it was her sister, Gladys Maublanc de Boisboucher, who had discovered the fragrance was later propagated in a biographical book.

== Fragrance ==
Henri Alméras created this perfume. His method was to use perfume bases heavily. A few years earlier, he created Jean Patou Moment Suprême (1929), a third of which was the Melittis perfume base from Givaudan of benzyl salicylate, coumarin, and eugenol. For Blue Grass, he started with Moment Suprême, replacing the Melittis perfume base with Melysflor—Firmenich's equivalent version of the same base, created for him—and then adding their Jasmine 231 base. (Melysflor and Melittis were both built on what Calkin and Jellinek term the mellis accord, a combination of benzyl salicylate for balsamic notes and eugenol for clove spice as its core, typically joined by other variable element.)

Alméras sold the formula to Parfumerie Fragonard in Grasse, and Georges Fuchs at Fragonard in turn sold it to Elizabeth Arden.

The fragrance has aldehydic top notes; spicy, floral middle notes; and warm, powdery base notes:

Top notes
Primarily lavender; also aldehydes, bergamot, geranium, neroli, and spearmint
Middle notes
Primarily jasmine and spicy notes; also carnation, narcissus, rose, and tuberose
Base notes
Benzoin, sandalwood, Tonkin musk, tonka bean, and vanilla

The Melysflor perfume base would later be used in Carven Vetiver (1957) and Yves Saint Laurent Pour Homme (1971).

== Ownership timeline ==
Blue Grass has remained with the Elizabeth Arden line, but that line has been sold multiple times since the founder's death.

- 1966: Elizabeth Graham died.
- 1971: Eli Lilly bought Elizabeth Arden.
- 1986/1987: Meshulam Riklis bought Elizabeth Arden from Eli Lilly for about $700 million, and put it within their Fabergé division.
- 1989: Unilever's US division bought Fabergé, which included Elizabeth Arden, from Riklis for $1.55 billion.
- 2000: French Fragrances, Inc. (FFI) bought Elizabeth Arden from Unilever for $240 million.
- 2001: FFI changed its name to Elizabeth Arden, Inc.
- 2016: Revlon bought Elizabeth Arden, Inc. (formerly FFI) for $870 million.
