= Chanel No. 22 =

Perfume by Coco Chanel

No. 22

Fragrance by Ernest Beaux
- Released: 1922 or 1928
- Label: Chanel

Chanel No. 22 is one of several well-known fragrances from Parisian couturier, Gabrielle "Coco" Chanel.

== History ==
Coco Chanel had worked with Ernest Beaux on her original perfume, Chanel No. 5, which debuted in 1921. The following year, they released Chanel No. 22.

In 1924, Pierre Wertheimer became a partner to Coco Chanel in her perfume business. He owned 70 percent; Chanel owned 10 percent, and a friend of Chanel's owned the remaining portion. Chanel agreed to owning such a small amount in exchange for having complete control over the product.

Ralph Barton, the eminent cartoonist for The New Yorker and who was said to have been somewhat of a dandy, reportedly wore the scent. "In lieu of a scarfpin, a scarab seal ring encircles his cravat, and when indoors he is partial to Chinese slippers. . . . Chanel No. 22 is his customary perfume. His favored dressing gown is of a gallant jade hue."

== Notes ==
Chanel No. 22 is classified as a floral-aldehyde with notes of white flowers, including roses, jasmine, tuberoses. Its top note is aldehyde with middle notes of jasmine, tuberose, ylang-ylang, and rose. Base notes include vetiver, vanilla, and incense. It has been called an old-fashioned floral and is said to have hints of lilac. Scent reviewer Chandler Burr said that "22 can be tough to appreciate immediately."

== Modern scent ==
The Wertheimer family still runs the Chanel perfume business.

Estée Lauder White Linen (1978) inspired Jacques Polge when he reformulated Chanel No. 22 in 1989.

Polge, the modern Chanel perfumer, released a collection called Les Exclusifs in February 2007. This included Chanel No. 22. The 200-milliliter spray bottle of the scent was sold exclusively in Chanel boutiques and at Bergdorf Goodman with a price of US$175. A "voile" - a lighter, alcohol-free version – of the scent was introduced in 1996.
