= Bois des Îles =

Fragrance by Coco Chanel

Fragrance by Coco Chanel
- Released: 1926
- Label: Chanel

Bois des Îles (pronounced [bwɑ dez‿il]) is a fragrance produced by Parisian couturier Gabrielle "Coco" Chanel. The name is French for "Island Wood" or, more literally, "Wood of the Islands".

== History ==
Coco Chanel had worked with Ernest Beaux on her original perfume, Chanel No. 5, which debuted in 1921. In 1926, they released Bois des Îles. According to the Chanel website, the fragrance of Bois des Iles was "the first woody fragrance for women".

The fragrance has notes of sandalwood, vetiver, tonka bean, vanilla, ylang ylang, iris, coriander, rose, jasmine, and aldehydes.
