= Flavorist =

Expert on food flavoring

A flavorist (or flavourist (Note: See spelling differences: American and British English spelling differences)), also known as flavor chemist (or flavour chemist), is someone who uses chemistry to engineer artificial and natural flavors. The tools and materials used by flavorists are almost the same as that used by perfumers with the exception that flavorists seek to mimic or modify both the olfactory and gustatory properties of various food products rather than creating just abstract smells. Additionally, the materials and chemicals that a flavorist utilizes for flavor creation must be safe for human consumption.

The profession of flavorists came about when affordable refrigeration for the home spurred food processing technology, which could affect the quality of the flavor of the food. In some cases, these technologies can remove naturally occurring flavors. To remedy the flavor loss, the food processing industry created the flavor industry. The chemists that resolved the demand of the food processing industry became known as flavorists.

== Education ==
Educational requirements for a flavorist are varied. Flavorists are often graduated either in Chemistry, Biology, or Food Science up to PhDs obtained in subjects such as Biochemistry and Chemistry. Because, however, the training of a flavorist is mostly done on-the-job and specifically at a flavor company known as a flavor house, this training is similar to the apprentice system.

Located in Versailles (France), ISIPCA French School offers two years of high-standard education in food flavoring including 12 months of traineeship in a flavor company. This education program provides students with a solid background in Flavoring formulation, flavor application, and flavor chemistry (analysis and sensory).

Every year The British Society of Flavourists together with Reading University provides, a three-week flavorist training course for flavorists from all around the world.

== Flavorist societies ==
In the United States, there is the Society of Flavor Chemists, which meets in New Jersey, Cincinnati, Chicago, and the West Coast 6 to 8 times a year. To be an apprentice flavorist in the society, one must pass an apprenticeship within a flavor house for five years. To be a certified member with voting rights, one must pass a seven-year program. Each level is verified by a written and oral test of the Membership Committee. As an alternative to training under a flavorist, rather than the above-mentioned cases, a 10-year independent option is available. At any given time there are approximately 400 certified and apprentice flavor chemists in the US.

In the United Kingdom, a flavourist can join The British Society of Flavourists, which meets near the London area. To acquire full membership, applicants must be sponsored by at least two voting members, shall not be under thirty years of age, and shall have been engaged as a creative flavourist for a period of at least ten years. To be an associate member, applicants must be either a full-time creative flavourist with at least four years' experience, a flavour application chemist, or a food technologist responsible for flavour blending, assessment, and evaluation for a period of at least five years, or a person of such standing in the flavour-producing or using industries as satisfies the Membership Committee that they are eligible for membership. An associate member must be proposed by two voting members. To be a student member, an applicant must be a new entrant to the flavour industry, not yet able to qualify as an Associate, and proposed by one voting member. To be an affiliate member, applicants must be Technical and Marketing Consultants or Commercial and Technical Managers having a direct relationship to the flavoring industry, and sponsored by three voting members.

== Prominent example ==
Grandma would make this concoction with rice and the sauce that she had; it was a combination of brown sugar and butter. It tasted good, obviously. They'd put it over the rice and eat it as a kind of a treat on Sundays...

– William Low, Pamela Low's brother

Pamela Low, a flavorist at Arthur D. Little and 1951 graduate of the University of New Hampshire with a microbiology degree, developed the original flavor for Cap'n Crunch in 1963 — recalling a recipe of brown sugar and butter her grandmother served over rice at her home in Derry, New Hampshire.

Robert (Bob) Reinhart developed a technique in the manufacture of Cap'n Crunch, using oil in its recipe as a flavor delivery mechanism — which initially presented problems in having the cereal bake properly. The cereal required innovation of a special baking process as it was one of the first cereals to use the oil coating method to deliver its flavoring.

Having arrived at the flavor coating for Cap'n Crunch, Low described it as giving the cereal a quality she called "want-more-ishness". After her death in 2007, the Boston Globe called Low "the mother of Cap'n Crunch." At Arthur D. Little, Low had also worked on the flavors for Heath, Mounds and Almond Joy candy bars.

== See also ==
- Perfumer
- Université Européenne des Senteurs & Saveurs
