= Bourjois =

French cosmetics brand

- Type: Public
- Industry: Beauty
- Founded: 1863 in Paris, France
- Headquarters: Puteaux, France
- Products: Fragrance; Cosmetics; Skin care
- Owner: Coty
- Website: www.bourjois.fr

Bourjois is a French cosmetics company owned by the French group Coty. Bourjois creates make-up, fragrance and skincare products, which are sold in approximately 26,000 points of sales in more than 80 countries worldwide, as of 2015.

== History ==
- 1862: Actor Joseph-Albert Ponsin created a skin product that would whiten the skin of artists, actors and actresses from theater and boulevard companies, to replace the greasy stage makeup in use by theatre artists.
- 1863: Ponsin launched his makeup company by preparing make up and perfume for actors and actresses.
- 1868: Alexandre-Napoleon Bourjois, a partner in the company was entrusted with Ponsin's entire activity.
- 1879: Word spread beyond theatre about their products and with the creation of a Java Rice Powder, a product to lighten the skin and leave it velvety, their target market widened to women and extended to the mass market worldwide.
- 1917: Pierre Wertheimer and his brother Paul took over the directorship of the company. The Wertheimer family, later also holders of the Chanel group, would own Bourjois for nearly 100 years.
- 1924: The first perfume of Bourjois, Mon Parfum, was designed by Ernest Beaux, the perfumer most famous for creating Chanel No. 5.
- 1928: Bourjois created its most famous perfume, Soir de Paris. The blue bottled perfume was a great success in the United States, where it was called Evening in Paris. It was one of the most popular fragrances during World War II and is highly valued by collectors nowadays.
- 1936: As women had started their fight of independence; Bourjois adapted to suit their market by promoting the use of make up for personal pleasure and to affirm personality. The company supported women's right to vote by one of its campaigns while the idea was still just a discussion in the French parliament.
- 1938: Constantin Weriguine was hired as a perfumer at Bourjois. He would go on to create fragrances such as Mais Oui (1938), Ramage (1951) and Glamour (1953) for the company.
- 1960: By this time Bourjois had developed a variety of perfumes, gift boxes, kits and make up products.
- 2014: In April 2015, the American group Coty bought Bourjois from the brothers Wertheimer for approximately 239 million American dollars.

== Fragrances ==
Bourjois has released at least 90 fragrances, including:

- Soir de Paris (1928), created by Ernest Beaux
- Kobako (1936), created by Ernest Beaux
- Équateur (1993)
- Masculin Ouragan (1997)
