= Jean Patou =

French fashion designer (1887–1936)

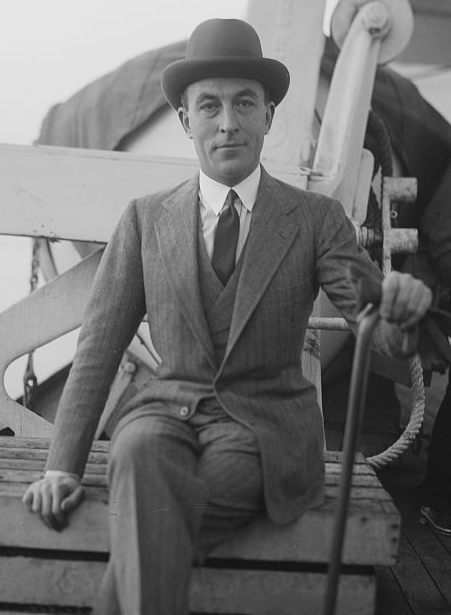
- Patou, c.late 1910s
- Born: 27 September 1880; Normandy, France
- Died: 8 March 1936 (aged 55); Paris, France
- Known for: Sportswear
- Label: Jean Patou

Jean Patou (pronounced [ʒɑ̃ patu]; 27 September 1880 – 8 March 1936) was a French fashion designer, and founder of the Jean Patou brand.

== Early life ==
Patou was born in Paris, France in 1880. Patou's family's business was tanning and furs. Patou worked with his uncle in Normandy, then moved to Paris in 1910, intent on becoming a couturier.

== 1910s – World War I and later ==
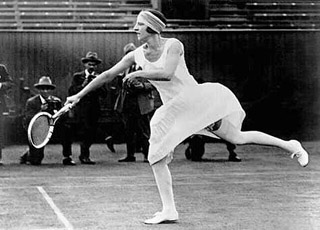
Suzanne Lenglen, la divine

In 1912, he opened a small dressmaking salon called "Maison Parry". His entire 1914 collection was purchased by a single American buyer. Patou's work was interrupted by the First World War. He was mobilised in August 1914, shortly after the German invasion of Belgium. Patou served as a captain in the Zouaves. Reopening his couture house in 1919, he became known for eradicating the flapper look by lengthening the skirt and designing sportswear for women and is considered the inventor of the knitted swimwear and the tennis skirt. He, notably, designed the then-daring sleeveless and knee-length cut tennis wear for Suzanne Lenglen. He also was the first designer to popularize the cardigan and moved fashion towards the natural and comfortable.

== 1920s ==
Jean Patou is credited with inventing the "designer tie" in the 1920s when men's ties, made in the same fabric as the women's dress collection, were displayed in department stores next to Patou's perfume counter. The designer tie style is still prominent amongst contemporary fashion designers, such as Louis Feraud, Timothy Everest, Duchamp and Paul Smith and Patrick McMurray.

In 1925 Patou launched his perfume business with three fragrances created by Henri Alméras. In 1928, Jean Patou created "Huile de Chaldée", the first suntan lotion.

Louis Süe designed all the perfume bottles and boxes for Jean Patou.

== 1930s ==
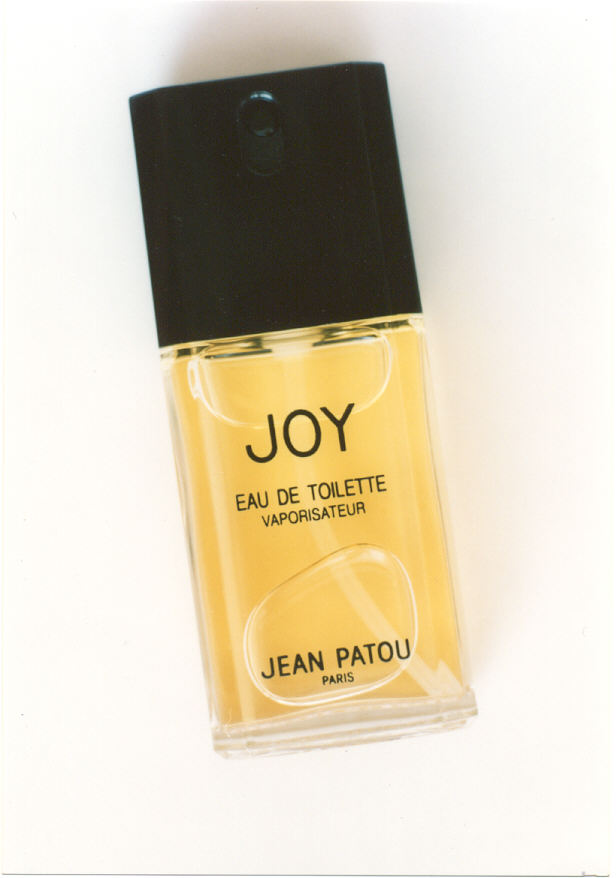
Joy by Jean Patou

When the stock market crashed, so did the market for luxury fashion. The House of Patou survived through its perfumes.

The best known of Patou's perfumes is "Joy", a heavy floral scent, based on the most precious rose and jasmine, that remained the costliest perfume in the world, until the House of Patou introduced "1000" (a heavy, earthy floral perfume, based on a rare osmanthus) in 1972. Before Joy, the House of Patou released many other perfumes, many which were to celebrate particular events. For example, Normandie (an oriental forerunner to perfumes such as Yves Saint Laurent's Opium) celebrated the French ocean liner of the same name, and Vacances (a mixture of green and lilac notes) celebrated the first French paid national holidays.

Other Patou perfumes of the same time were:

- Amour Amour – the forerunner of Joy, using the same rose notes, but without the jasmine
- Adieu Sagesse, Que Sais-Je? - these two and Amour Amor were released at the same time; Patou's idea was that the light floral Amour Amour was suitable for blondes; the tart, spicy Adieu Sagesse for redheads, and the heavy floral Que Sais-Je? for brunettes
- L'Heure Attendue – a wonderful, unique oriental perfume
- Divine Folie – a floral vanilla
- Câline – a wonderful chypre perfume, similar to the much later Diorling by Christian Dior
- Moment Suprême – a perfume based on lavender
- Colony – which had a strong pineapple note
- Chaldée – Patou's Huile de Chaldée sun oil had become so popular, many customers were buying it purely for its smell, therefore, Chaldée the perfume (a dry musk) was produced
- Le Sien – one of the first perfumes for men and women
- Cocktail – literally a floral cocktail

All these, with the exception of Le Sien, were re-released during the 1980s (under the name Ma Collection), and were available until recently, all in a 50 ml Eau de Toilette Spray, 75 ml Eau de Toilette bottle, and 30 ml pure perfume bottle, each with a unique art deco box. A Jean Patou silk scarf, printed in a pattern complementing that of the box was included with the pure perfume. Joy remains the world's second best-selling scent (the first is Chanel No. 5), Joy was created by Henri Alméras for Patou at the height of the Great Depression (1935) for Patou's former clients who could no longer afford his haute couture clothing line.

== Legacy ==
=== Haute couture ===
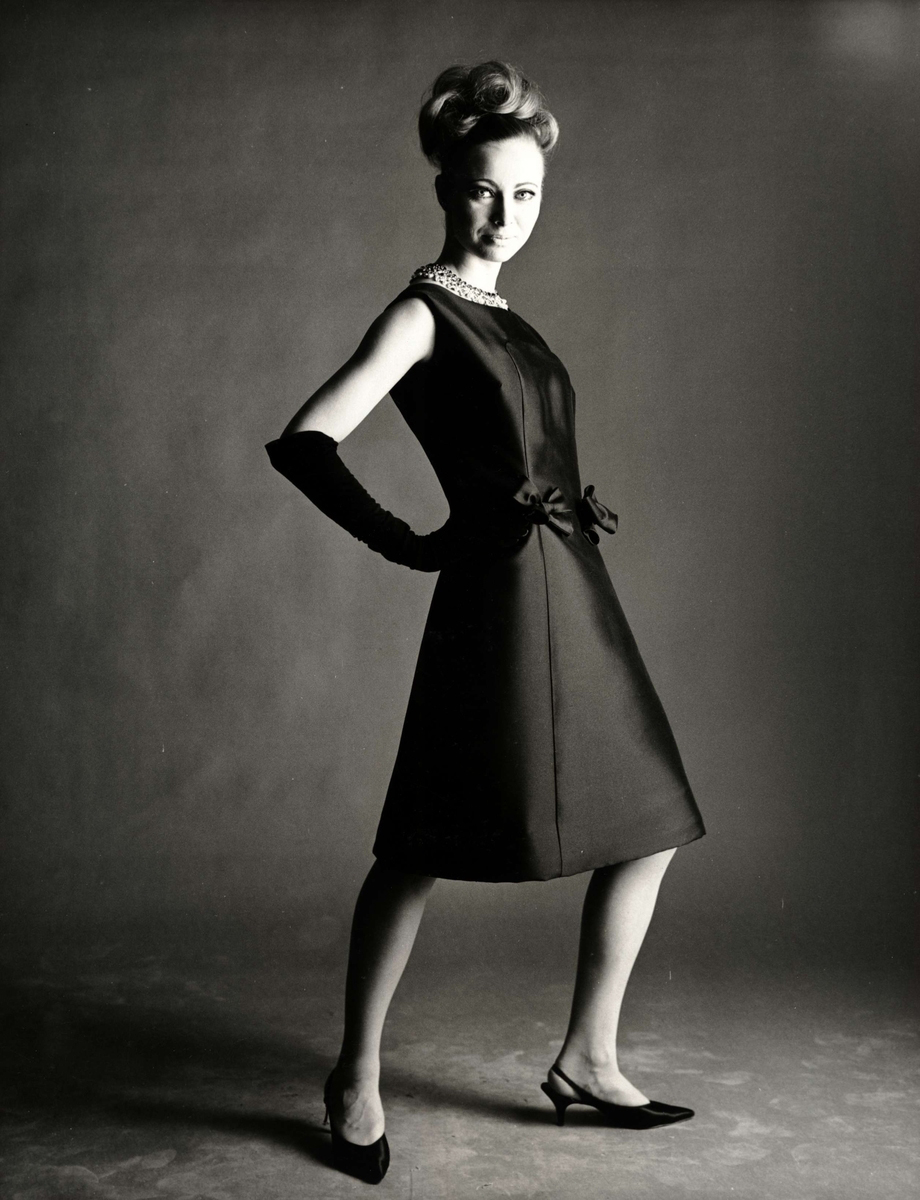
Model at NK Ladies French Tailoring by the House of Patou, in Stockholm, 1965

Patou was discovered unresponsive in his home the night of March 8, 1936 and died less than an hour later. He had been found to have suffered a massive cerebral hemorrhage nearly 24 hours earlier. He died 4 months after his 55th birthday. His sister Madeleine and her husband Raymond Barbas continued the House of Patou.

Designers for the House of Patou have included Marc Bohan (1954–1956), Karl Lagerfeld (1960–1963) and Jean Paul Gaultier (1971–1973). Christian Lacroix joined the label in 1981. The last fashion collection produced by the House of Patou label was in 1987 when the haute couture business closed definitively following Lacroix's departure to open his own house.

=== Perfumes ===
After the closure of the haute couture business the company has continued to produce fragrances under the Jean Patou brand. Patou also produced fragrances for Lacoste, when Patou acquired the license in the 1960s, and Yohji Yamamoto in the 1990s.

From 1967 to 1999 Jean Kerléo was the house perfumer, he developed all their perfumes during that time including "1000" (1972) and "Sublime" (1992), "Patou Pour Homme" (1980).

In 1984, Jean Kerléo was responsible for the reformulation and reissue of twelve of Patou's fragrances from 1925 to 1964 in a series called "Ma Collection", including the first fragrances created for the house in 1925, the trio "Amour-Amour", "Que sais-je?" and "Adieu Sagesse". "Ma Collection" was sold in flacons modelled after the originals by Louis Süe.

Kerleo stepped down in 1999 appointing Jean-Michel Duriez as house perfumer. Duriez creations include "Un Amour de Patou" (1998), "Enjoy" (2003) and "Sira des Indes" (2006).

"Joy" was voted "Scent of the Century" by the public at the Fragrance Foundation FiFi Awards in 2000, beating its rival "Chanel No. 5".

Jean Patou remained a family-owned business until September 2001 when it was bought by P&G Prestige Beaute a division of Procter & Gamble, which also market perfumes for Jean Kerléo and Karl Lagerfeld.

In 2011, the UK-based company Designer Parfums Ltd bought the Jean Patou portfolio from Procter & Gamble. Thomas Fontaine is the house perfumer.
