= Henri Alméras =

French perfumer, author and painter

- Born: 1892; Brittany, France
- Died: 1965 (aged 72–73)
- Known for: Perfumery

Henri Alméras (1892–1965) was a French perfumer, author, and painter.

== Early life and career ==
Alméras was born in a garrison in Brittany, the son of an officer. In school, he excelled in chemistry. He performed his military service in 1913 and was sent to war the following year. While fighting on the Macedonian front, he first met the couturier Jean Patou.

Upon returning to France, he worked briefly at the physics laboratory at Dunlop, before answering an advertisement in Le Journal to join Antoine Chiris in Grasse. There he trained as a perfumer for four years alongside Ernest Beaux and Vincent Roubert. He left for Germany, working at a manufactory in the Ruhr, but soon returned to France.

He was employed as a perfumer by Paul Poiret at the couturier's Parfums de Rosine as of 1923, though certain sources suggest he had worked there since 1914. In 1925, he left Rosine for the Parfums d’Orsay, working with Henri Robert, though quit soon after. He was subsequently hired by Jean Patou, where he remained until 1933. He left to work for Fragonard and several other houses.

In 1948, he published his comic novella La grand’soif du trompette Bidard (The Grea’Thirst of the Trumpeter Bidard), inspired by his military service, under the pseudonym Henri de Vérac. In the late 1940s, he managed the Parfums de Luzy. He also served as an advisor at Fabergé.

== Perfumes ==
Alméras relied heavily on perfume bases, which are building blocks sold by fragrance houses to perfumers to aid in their creations. For some of his perfumes, 50%–75% of the formula was one or two bases. For example, Habera (1928) and Moment Suprême (1929) use Givaudan's Melittis base, which is a spicy floral created by Marius Reboul. To create Blue Grass (1934), he adapted Moment Suprême by exchanging the Melittis base with one created by Firmenich, Melysflor, and also adding their Jasmine 231 base.

=== For Parfums de Rosine ===
- 1915: Mam'zelle Victoire
- 1916 and 1918: Le Fruit Défendu

This perfume was launched and relaunched, but without success. An amber-woody floral with an innovative apricot note similar to modern gourmands, this perfume also was similar to his later Que Sais-je (1925).

- 1921: Le Balcon

This floral perfume had honeyed notes of narcissus, rose, and jasmine, which he mirrored in his Chaldee (1927).

- 1922: Sakya-Mouni

This is a woody floral.

- 1926: Qui es-tu?

This is a soliflore, designed to smell like a single note—in this case, lilacs, which is similar to his later Vacances (1936).

- 1926 or 1928: Habera

Two different dates are reported for this perfume, which was similar to his later Moment Suprême (1929) due to shared perfume bases.

=== For Jean Patou ===
Louis Süe designed all bottles and boxes for the Patou perfumes. Alméras's perfumes are preserved in the archives of the Osmothèque, where they are accessible to the public.

- 1925: Amour Amour

This is a floral fragrance and part of a trilogy of perfumes with Que Sais-Je? and Adieu Sagesse. Amour Amour represents the initial rush of romantic love.

- 1925: Que Sais-Je?

This scent represents the hesitation one feels before acting on romantic feelings. Que sais je? is a fruity fragrance with notes of peach, apricot, orange flower, jasmine, and rose.

- 1925: Adieu Sagesse

This one represents the moment when one surrenders to passion. Adieu Sagesse is a floral fragrance with notes of neroli, lily-of-the-valley, carnation, tuberose, and opopanax. It has a base of musk and civet.

- 1927: Chaldée

This was inspired by Patou's Huile de Chaldée, the first ever suntan lotion. The fragrance celebrates the new fashion for suntanning that arose in the 1920s. The name is a reference to Chaldea, and the fragrance is a dry blend of spices, amber, and opopanax.

- 1928: Le Sien

This was the first of the fresh, clean, sporty type of perfumes and was promoted as a unisex fragrance for men and women. In 1929, Jean Patou advertised the chypre and leather fragrance, as “a masculine perfume for the outdoors woman” who “plays golf, smokes and drives a car at 120 kilometers an hour.” It is classified as a citrus chypre fragrance for men and women. Top notes: bergamot. Middle notes: lavender, fern. Base notes: leather, oakmoss, Bourbon vetiver, Mysore sandalwood, tonka, amber, musk, labdanum.

- 1929: Moment Suprême

This is spicy amber fragrance with notes of geranium, clove, bergamot, rose and jasmine.

- 1929: Joy

Released at the beginning of the Great Depression, Joy is Jean Patou's most famous fragrance. When it came out, it was marketed as the "costliest perfume in the world." Joy is a classic example of the floral perfume genre, and it is known for its notes of Bulgarian rose and French jasmine.

- 1930: The Cocktail trio: Cocktail Dry, Cocktail Bitter, and Cocktail Bittersweet

These perfumes reference the cocktail bars that Jean Patou installed in his showrooms, for women to enjoy as they waited for alterations.

- 1933: Divine Folie

This is an amber floral fragrance with notes of orange flower, ylang-ylang, neroli, iris, vetiver, jasmine, rose, musk and vanilla.

- 1935: Normandie

This was released to celebrate the launch of the luxury French ocean liner of the same name, Normandie is a chypre fragrance with wood and fruit notes.

- 1936: Vacances

This was released to celebrate the first paid holidays in France, Vacances is a fresh floral fragrance with notes of hawthorn, galbanum, hyacinth, lilac and mimosa.

- 1938: Colony

This is a fruity chypre with a prominent note of pineapple, Colony was inspired by the warm climate of tropical islands.

=== Blue Grass (1934) ===
Alméras created this perfume using Moment Suprême as a starting point, with the perfume base changed from Melittis to Melysflor and Jasmine 231. He sold the formula to Parfumerie Fragonard in Grasse, and Georges Fuchs at Fragonard in turn sold it to Elizabeth Arden.
