= Patou =

French fashion house

- Type: Subsidiary
- Industry: Fashion
- Founded: 1914
- Founder: Jean Patou
- Headquarters: 8 quai du Marché Neuf, 75004, Paris, France
- Owner: Nirvana Investments LLC-FZ
- Website: www.patou.com

Patou (French pronunciation: [patu]), formerly known as Jean Patou or Jean Patou Paris, is a French fashion house.

== History ==
The company was originally created by Jean Patou in 1914 and was eponymously named. After his premature death in 1936, numerous fashion designers took charge of the Maison, including Marc Bohan, Karl Lagerfeld, Michel Goma, Jean Paul Gaultier, Angelo Tarlazzi and Christian Lacroix.

From 1919 the business designed and produced haute couture, ready-to-wear and perfume. In 1987, the haute couture activity was stopped. The same year, the Jean Patou house launched an accessories line, the artistic direction of which was entrusted to Peggy Huynh Kinh. By 1996 the company had closed.

Patou was acquired by Procter & Gamble in 2001. In 2011 it was bought by Designer Parfums Ltd, a UK-based firm.

In September 2018, the LVMH group announced a strategic partnership with Designer Parfums Ltd, assimilating majority shares in the Jean Patou portfolio. As soon as the partnership was announced, LVMH relaunched the brand's couture activity, renamed "Patou", and appointed Guillaume Henry as Artistic Director.

The brand's flagship fragrance, JOY, marketed as "the most expensive perfume in the world" since the 1929 crisis, disappeared so the JOY name was reassigned to a new Dior product. The brand's other fragrances were also discontinued.

Patou introduced a leather handbag for the first time, called Le Patou Bag, in 2021.

Guillaume Henry, the Artistic Director of Patou, exited in February 2026.

In July 2026, LVMH sold it's entire stake in Patou to Nirvana Investments LLC-FZ, Dilesh Mehta's holding company. Mehta had retained a minority shareholding after the 2018 partnership between LVMH and Designer Parfums Ltd, and the sale returned full ownership of the house to him. The sale followed LVMH's divestment of Marc Jacobs.
