= ISIPCA =

French post-graduate school

Coordinates: 48.816569°N 2.142267°E

Institut supérieur international du parfum, de la cosmétique et de l'aromatique alimentaire
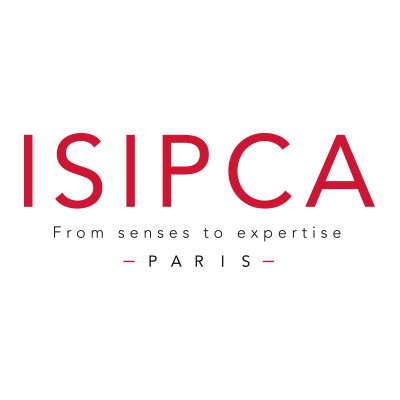
- Former name: ISIPCA
- Motto: From senses to expertise
- Type: Post-graduate studies school in perfume and cosmetics
- Established: 1970
- Head: Nicolas Salado
- Location: Versailles, Yvelines
- Website: http://www.isipca.fr

ISIPCA (Institut supérieur international du parfum, de la cosmétique et de l'aromatique alimentaire) is a French school for post-graduate studies in perfume, cosmetics products and food flavor formulation, with an apprenticeship period in the industry. It was founded in 1970 by Jean-Jacques Guerlain as ISIP (Institut supérieur international du parfum). It became Groupe ISIPCA in 1984 when the CCIV (Chambre de commerce et d'industrie de Versailles-Val-d'Oise-Yvelines) backed up and sponsored the school with significant capital.

From 2004 to 2017, ISIPCA and UVSQ (University of Versailles) established a partnership in order to offer postgraduate programmes (Bachelor's degree Diplomas and Professional Masters) in perfumery, cosmetics and food flavoring.

The school is affiliated with the Osmothèque, a perfume archive that researches ancient perfumes, and reconstructs fragrances whose formulas have been lost.

The facilities are a mix of renovated ancient buildings, protected by Historic Landmark status, and contemporary architecture by parisian architects Philippe Ameller and Jacques Dubois (2004).

== Notable alumni ==
- Francis Kurkdjian, French contemporary perfumer and businessman
- Annick Ménardo, Contemporary perfumer

== See also ==
- Flavorist
- Perfumer
- Université Européenne des Senteurs & Saveurs
