= Ernest Beaux =

Russian-French perfumer (1881–1961)

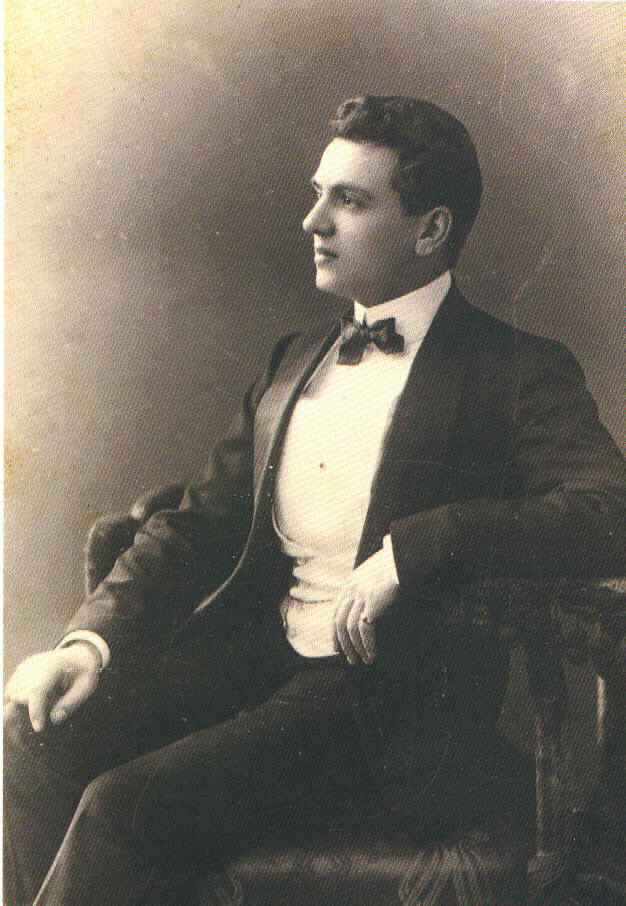
- Beaux in 1917–1921
- Born: 7 December 1881; Moscow, Russia
- Died: 9 June 1961 (aged 79); Paris, France
- Occupation: Perfumer
- Known for: Chanel No. 5

Ernest Beaux (Note: Russian: Эрнест Бо, romanized: Ernest Bo.) (French pronunciation: [ɛʁnɛst bo]; 7 December [O.S. 25 November] 1881 – 9 June 1961) was a Russian-French perfumer who created the perfume Chanel No. 5.

== Family background ==
Born in Moscow, Ernest Beaux was the son of Edouard Hyppolite Beaux (1835–1899) and his second wife Augustine Wilgemina Misfeld (1843–1906), who was originally from Lille, France. Ernest Beaux's grandmother, Jeanne-Cléophée Beaux (1810–1882), had come to Russia at the beginning of the 1840s. Édouard-Hyppolyte was her son with Jean Joseph Messinger (1810–1848).

Edouard Francois Beaux (1862–?), Ernest Beaux's half-brother by his father's first wife, Adelaide Fiurth (1842–1879), began as a clerk with the Moscow trading house of Muir and Mirrielees. He joined A. Rallet & Co., ultimately becoming a member of the board and Deputy Administrator.

== Career ==
Ernest Beaux was born in Moscow, Russia, the brother of Edouard Beaux, who worked for Alphonse Rallet & Co. of Moscow, then the foremost Russian perfume house and purveyor to the Imperial courts. In 1898, A. Rallet and Company, with approximately 1500 employees and 675 products, was sold to the French perfume house Chiris of La Bocca.

Ernest completed his primary education that same year, and from 1898 to 1900 apprenticed as laboratory technician in the soap works of Rallet. After his obligatory two years of military service in France, he returned to Moscow in 1902, where he started his perfumery training at Rallet under the guidance of their technical director, A. Lemercier. He finished his perfumery education in 1907, earned a promotion to senior perfumer, and was elected to the board of directors.

In 1912 Russia celebrated the centennial of the Battle of Borodino, the turning point in Napoleon's Russian ambitions. For this celebration Ernest Beaux created the fragrance "Bouquet de Napoleon," a floral Eau de Cologne, for Rallet. It proved to be a major commercial success.

The following year, 1913, marked the tercentenary of the founding of the Romanov dynasty. To follow up on his "Bouquet de Napoleon" success, Ernest Beaux created a now-lost fragrance, the "Bouquet de Catherine", honoring Catherine the Great. This fragrance is not to be confused with a fragrance from Brocard, Rallet's chief competitor in Russia called "The Empress's Favorite Bouquet", which later evolved into the Soviet version, "Red Moscow."

Bouquet de Catherine was not a marketing success, perhaps due to Catherine the Great's German heritage at a time of rising tensions between Russia and Germany which would lead, in 1914, to World War I. While born and raised in Russia, Ernest Beaux's French heritage brought him into the French army. While it was generally expected that this war would last no more than a few months, he was not released from military service until 1919, having by this time seen service in the infantry fighting against Germany and then as an intelligence officer and interrogator at an Allied prison camp at the Kola Peninsula at the Murmansk Oblast during the Russian Civil War.

While serving in the French military, Ernest Beaux's perfumer colleagues at Rallet fled during Russia's October Revolution to La Bocca, France, to continue working with Chiris. In 1918 he was working as a counter-intelligence officer on the British-French concentration camp of Mudyug island, interrogating Bolsheviks captured by the White Russian and Allied armies. In 1919 Ernest Beaux, released now from the army, settled in Paris but continued to have a relationship with the former Rallet employees at La Boca.

Chanel No. 5

In 1912, Ernest Beaux married Iraïde de Schoenaich (1881–1961), who gave birth to their son, Edouard (1913–1993), the following year. During the Russian Civil War, Iraïde escaped from Russia through Finland with her infant son. They reached France by sea following a dangerous two-month-long voyage, during which time Iraïde fell deeply in love with another man. Ernest divorced her and took custody of their son, while Iraïde moved to Nice to work with her lover. Ernest later married Yvonne Girodon (1893–1980), with whom he had a daughter, Madeleine.

== Coco Chanel and the N°5 ==
At that time, Joseph Robert was the chief perfumer at Chiris. With little prospect of being promoted under him, Ernest Beaux tried to use his contacts to the emigrated Russian nobility to get new projects. In 1920, with the help of the Grand Duke Dmitri Pavlovich of Russia (1891–1941), a companion of Coco Chanel (1883–1971), he arranged a meeting in Cannes late in the summer of 1920, where he presented his current and former works to Mlle. Chanel. Chanel chose the "No. 5" with an overdose of aldehydes as a Christmas present for her best clients. When Ernest Beaux asked her how she wanted to name that scent, she replied: "I always launch my collection on the 5th day of the 5th months, so the number 5 seems to bring me luck – therefore, I will name it 'Nº 5'".

Initially only 100 flacons of Chanel Nº 5 were produced, which she gave away on Christmas 1921 for free to her best clients. However, soon the demand was such that she decided to launch the perfume officially for sale in her shops in 1922. That year she also launched a second fragrance from the two numbered series of bottles that Beaux had presented her, which were numbered one through five, and twenty through twenty-four: Chanel Nº 22, the bottle no. 22 from the second series. However, since this didn't do as well as Nº 5, it was withdrawn and only relaunched in 1926.

Ernest Beaux left Chiris in 1922 to head a sales agency for his friend Eugene Charabot in Paris. However, Chanel Nº 5 did so well that Bader and Wertheimer, owners of Galeries Lafayette, bought the rights to it from Coco Chanel on April 4, 1924, and founded Les Parfums Chanel, for which they hired Ernest Beaux as chief perfumer. In his new function Ernest Beaux created many famous perfumes until he retired in 1954; his successor as chief perfumer of Perfumes Chanel was Henri Robert.

== Death and funeral ==
Ernest Beaux died in his Paris apartment on 9 June 1961, aged 79. The church in which his funeral was held was completely decorated in roses.

== Creating perfumes and later controversies ==
"Pepper and salt don't taste pleasantly when taken alone, but they enhance the taste of a dish," Beaux said in a 1953 interview with Time. The article continued: "Beaux gives each essence the nose test because some scents will last after a week of exposure, while others, for some unknown reason, will last only a few hours. When he is creating a new perfume he does no sniffing, simply jots down a formula, claims he knows exactly what the final result will smell like. Says Beaux: 'It is like writing music. Each component has a definite tonal value ... I can compose a waltz or a funeral march.'" At the time of the interview, Beaux was not working on any new perfumes, according to the head of the Chanel fragrance house, Pierre Wertheimer.

Another quote from Ernest Beaux highlights the importance of synthetic perfumery raw materials: "The future of perfumery is in the hands of chemists... We'll have to rely on the chemists to find new chemicals if we are to make new and original accords."

Since Coco Chanel's breakthrough as couturier only took place in 1925 with her design of the little black dress, she felt taken advantage of by Wertheimer, and, after an attempt in World War II to use Nazi influence to seize control of the company from Jewish Wertheimer, fought against her own perfumes in creating competitive fragrances under her own name, for instance "Mademoiselle Chanel Nº 1" (1946), sold exclusively in her own shops. In France this was prohibited by judicial action for counterfeiting, but Saks Fifth Avenue in New York and Neiman Marcus in Texas kept distributing, and, when customers reacted with puzzlement, Wertheimer gave in and raised Coco Chanel's share in the company. In 1947, Wertheimer and Chanel made peace, and when Chanel wanted to resurrect her couture house, he even backed her financially. "Although she made a fortune on the perfume, throughout her lifetime she was convinced that the deal had been heavily weighted in favor of Wertheimer and that she had been cheated out of a huge sum of money."

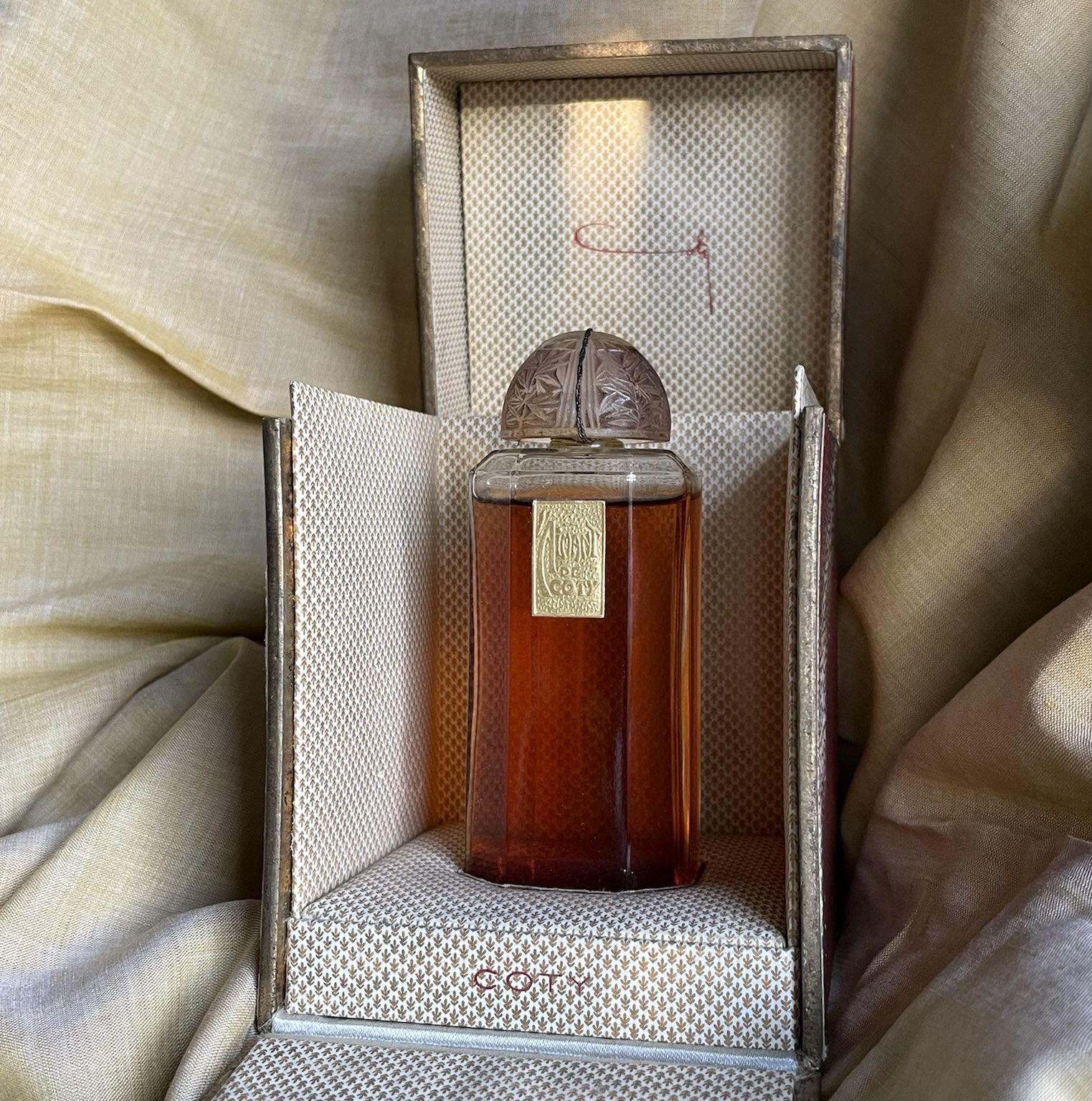
L'Aimant-Coty.

His former employer Chiris was not happy to see Beaux leave with the formula to Perfumes Chanel, and thus asked Vincent Roubert, who had replaced Beaux at Chiris, to make in 1926 his own adaptation of the Bouquet de Catherine, which actually was going back even to Rallet Perfumes. The result was L' Aimant (Coty, 1926), which initially indeed threatened the success of Chanel Nº 5. L' Aimant was a near copy of Nº 5, but Perfumes Chanel avenged this by hiring Jean Helleu, the designer of the first L' Aimant bottle, and in copying his design for the flacon of Chanel Nº 5.

== Selected works ==
- 1912 – Bouquet de Napoleon, Rallet
- 1914 – Bouquet de Catherine, Rallet
- 1920 – Le Gardenia, Rallet
- 1921 – No. 5, Chanel
- 1926 – No. 22, Chanel
- 1924 – Cuir de Russie, Chanel
- 1925 – Gardénia, Chanel
- 1926 – Bois des Îles, Chanel
- 1929 – Soir de Paris, Bourjois
- 1936 – Kobako, Bourjois
- 1955 – Premier Muguet, Bourjois

Many of Ernest Beaux's perfumes are preserved in their original formulation at the Osmothèque in Versailles, where they may be accessed by the public.
