= Osmothèque =

Perfume formulas archive library

The Osmothèque
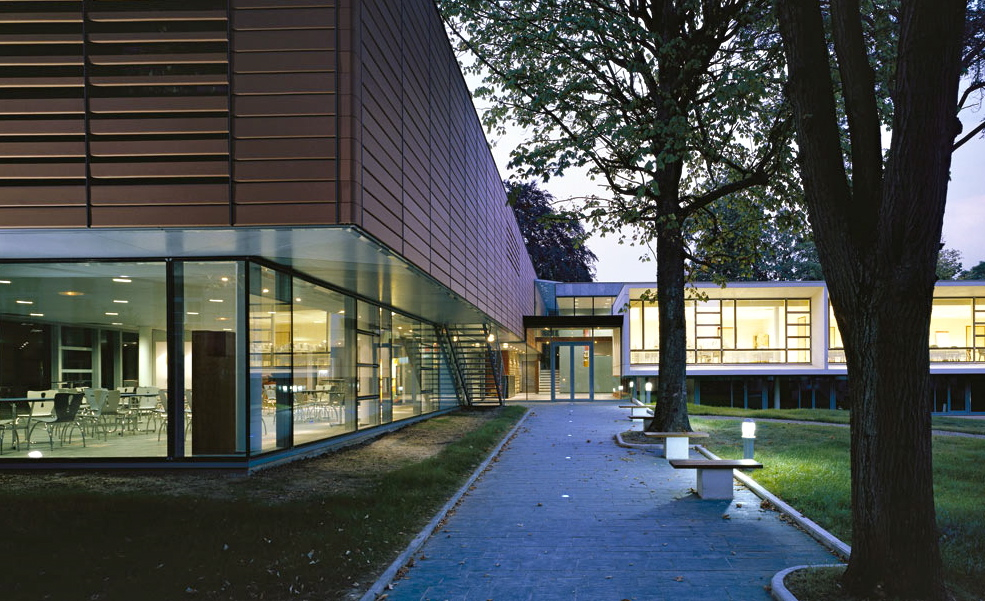
- Established: April 26, 1990; 36 years ago
- Location: 36 Rue du Parc de Clagny; 78000 Versailles
- Coordinates: 48.817178°N 2.141558°E
- Type: Scent archive
- President: Thomas Fontaine
- Public transit access: Gare de Versailles-Rive-Droite
- Website: osmotheque.fr

The Osmothèque (from Greek osmē "scent" patterned on French bibliothèque "library") is the world's largest scent archive, a leading international research institution tracing the history of perfumery, based in Versailles with conference centers in New York City and Paris. Founded in 1990 by Jean Kerléo and other senior perfumers including Jean-Claude Ellena and Guy Robert, the Osmothèque is internationally responsible for the authentication, registration, preservation, documentation and reproduction of thousands of perfumes gathered from the past two millennia, archived at the Osmothèque repository and consultable by the public.

Exclusive to the collection are countless rare masterpieces elsewhere discontinued or reformulated, including François Coty’s Chypre (Coty), Paul Parquet’s Fougère Royale (Houbigant) and Aimé Guerlain's Jicky (Guerlain) as well as numerous personalized fragrances worn by historical figures such as Elizabeth of Poland, Napoleon and Eugénie de Montijo. From 2008 to 2020, Patricia de Nicolaï served as the institution's president. Since July 2020, independent perfumer Thomas Fontaine had been serving as its President, along with Christopher Sheldrake as the Vice President.

== History ==
The founding of the world's first international scent archive was initially proposed to the Société Française des Parfumeurs in 1976 by Jean Kerléo, then head perfumer at Jean Patou, in an effort to formally record and preserve the history of perfumery. Kerléo envisioned reconstituting various discontinued classics according to their original formulas, working in collaboration with the world's foremost perfumers and perfume houses. An advisory committee was thus assembled, composed of experts Jean-François Blayn, Raymond Chaillan, Jean-Claude Ellena, Yuri Gutsatz, Jeannine Mongin, Raymond Pouliquen, Guy Robert and Henri Sebag.

After successfully reproducing the discontinued perfumes of Jean Patou, Jean Kerléo and his team were entrusted in 1986 with the formulae of the defunct F. Millot, among them the 1925 classic Crêpe de Chine by Jean Desprez. Kerléo's reconstitution, completed a year later with perfumer Aimable Duhayon, impressed many within the industry, a major catalyst for the launch of the proposed scent archive. When in 1988 the project won the support of both the Chambre de Commerce et d’Industrie de Versailles and the Comité Français du Parfum, a repository facility was provided on the premises of the Institut Supérieur International du Parfum, de la Cosmétique et de l'Aromatique alimentaire. There the Osmothèque was officially founded on 26 April 1990 with an initial collection of 400 perfumes, both those reproduced by the Osmothèque and those supplied by external perfumers at houses such as Chanel, Guerlain and Lanvin.

== The collections ==
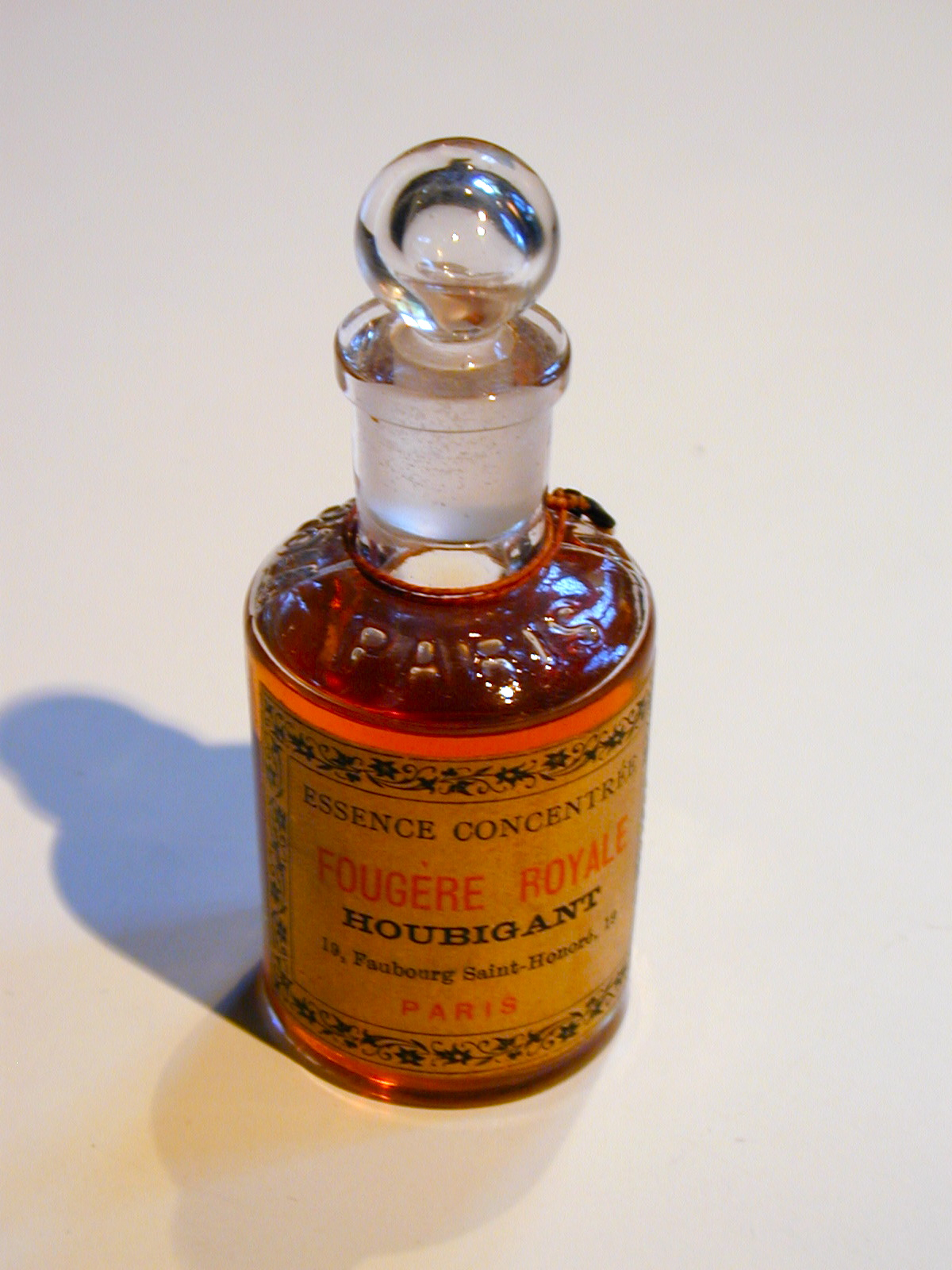
Paul Parquet's Fougère Royale (Houbigant) - 1884

The Osmothèque is the world's largest scent archive, storing over 3,000 perfumes from the past and present, all preserved at a constant temperature under argon gas. Perfumes accepted into the collection are either those reconstituted using archived formulae by the Osmothèque's internal perfumers (known as osmocurators) or those supplied by external perfume houses. As a legal deposit archive, the Osmothèque receives a supply of all new perfumes produced in France and much of the world, in addition to those obtained through its program for content acquisitions. The role of chief archivist was filled by Patricia de Nicolaï, having assumed the presidency of the Osmothèque from Jean Kerléo in 2008. This role had since been passed to the current President, Thomas Fontaine, with Vice President Christopher Sheldrake assisting, since July 2020.

=== Fragrance materials ===
The institution also maintains a substantial reference library of fragrance bases and aromatic sources, both natural and synthetic, historical and contemporary, as well as a vault inaccessible to the public containing historical perfume formulae, many unusable due to a lack of corresponding raw materials.

=== Perfume formulations ===
Rarities from the Osmothèque's collections include examples of ancient perfumery, such as the Parfum Royal of the Parthian kings as described by Pliny the Elder in the 1st century, medieval toilet waters such as the 14th century Eau de la reine de Hongrie of Elizabeth of Poland and 18th century powders such as the Poudre de Chypre.

Equally unique is a major collection of 19th century perfumes from leading houses such as Farina, Guerlain, Houbigant, Lubin, F. Millot, L. T. Piver and Roger & Gallet. Also from the period is the eau de cologne made for Napoleon in 1815 during his exile on Saint Helena.

The largest portion of the Osmothèque's archives is devoted to modern perfumery (beginning in the late 19th century), presenting innumerable original masterpieces now discontinued or reformulated, including:

Year	Perfumer	Name	Company
1882	Paul Parquet	Fougère Royale	Houbigant
1889	Aimé Guerlain	Jicky	Guerlain
1900	Paul Parquet	Le Parfum Idéal	Houbigant
1901	Paul Parquet	Peau d’Espagne	Houbigant
1916	Henri Alméras	Le Fruit Défendu	Rosine
1917	François Coty	Chypre	Coty
1925	Jean Desprez	Crepe de Chine	Millot
1921	François Coty	Emeraude	Coty
1944	Germaine Cellier	Bandit	Robert Piguet
1946-47	Vincent Roubert	Iris Gris	Jacques Fath
1949	Edmond Roudnitska	Diorama	Christian Dior
1981	Jean-Yves Leroy	Nombre Noir	Shiseido
1999	Jean-Michel Duriez	Yohji Homme	Yohji Yamamoto

== Other services ==
The Osmothèque maintains an active website, including an online database detailing the institution's collections.

Various conferences for professionals, researchers, students and members of the public are regularly offered at the Osmothèque's headquarters in Versailles, as well as at conference centers at the Galerie de Nicolaï in Paris and the Academy of Perfumery & Aromatics in New York City. In addition, the Osmothèque frequently organizes partner exhibitions and conferences with museums around the world, including the Carrousel du Louvre, the Palace of Versailles and the Smithsonian Institution.

The Osmothèque also publishes books on the subject of perfume, in addition to a bilingual periodical titled Les Nouvelles de l’Osmothèque, available online and at the Osmothèque's bookshop.

== See also ==
- Archives nationales (France)
- Bibliothèque nationale de France
- Library of Congress
- National Archives and Records Administration
- List of archives
- List of libraries in France
