= Chanel No. 5 =

Perfume by Coco Chanel

No. 5
- Bottle of Chanel No. 5, Eau de Parfum version

Fragrance by Coco Chanel
- Released: 5 May 1921, to select clientele at Chanel, rue Cambon, Paris
- Label: Chanel
- Perfumer(s): Ernest Beaux

Chanel No. 5 is the first perfume launched by French couturier Gabrielle "Coco" Chanel in 1921. The scent formula for the fragrance was compounded by French-Russian chemist and perfumer Ernest Beaux. The design of its bottle has been an important part of the product's branding. Coco Chanel was the first face of the fragrance, appearing in the advertisement published by Harper's Bazaar in 1937.

== Inspiration ==
Traditionally, fragrances worn by women fell into two basic categories. Respectable women favored the essence of a single garden flower while sexually provocative indolic perfumes heavy with animal musk or jasmine were associated with women of the demi-monde, prostitutes, or courtesans. Chanel sought a new scent that would appeal to the flapper and celebrate the seemingly liberated feminine spirit of the 1920s.

== The No. 5 name ==
At the age of twelve, Chanel was handed over to the care of nuns, and for the next six years spent a stark, disciplined existence in a convent orphanage, Aubazine, founded by 12th-century Cistercians in the Corrèze department of south-west France. From her earliest days there, the number five had potent associations for her. For Chanel, the number five was especially esteemed as signifying the pure embodiment of a thing, its spirit, its mystic meaning. The paths that led Chanel to the cathedral for daily prayers were laid out in circular patterns repeating the number five.

Her affinity for the number five commingled with the abbey gardens, and by extension the lush surrounding hillsides abounding with Cistus (rock roses).

In 1920, when presented with small glass vials containing sample scents numbered 1 to 5 and 20 to 24 for her assessment, she chose the fifth vial. Chanel told her master perfumer, Ernest Beaux, whom she had commissioned to develop a new fragrance, "I present my dress collections on the fifth of May, the fifth month of the year and so we will let this sample number five keep the name it has already, it will bring good luck."

== Bottle design ==
Chanel envisioned a design that would be an antidote for the over-elaborate, precious fussiness of the crystal fragrance bottles then in fashion popularized by Lalique and Baccarat. Her bottle would be "pure transparency...an invisible bottle". It is generally considered that the bottle design was inspired by the rectangular beveled lines of the Charvet toiletry bottles, which, outfitted in a leather traveling case, were favored by her lover, Arthur "Boy" Capel. Some say it was the whiskey decanter he used that she admired and wished to reproduce in "exquisite, expensive, delicate glass".

The first bottle produced in 1922 differed from the Chanel No. 5 bottle known today. The original container had small, delicate, rounded shoulders and was sold only in Chanel boutiques to select clients. In 1924, when "Parfums Chanel" incorporated, the glass proved too thin to survive shipping and distribution. The bottle was modified with square, faceted corners, its only significant design change. In a 1924 marketing brochure, Parfums Chanel described the bottle as, "the perfection of the product forbids dressing it in the customary artifices. Why rely on the art of the glassmaker...Mademoiselle is proud to present simple bottles adorned only by...precious teardrops of perfume of incomparable quality, unique in composition, revealing the artistic personality of their creator." Others claim that the bottle's design was inspired by a whiskey bottle, while some say that the inspiration was drawn from glass pharmaceutical vials. In choosing the design for her perfume's bottle, Chanel was looking for something simple, even clinical, to stand apart from the overstated designs customarily seen on the perfume counter.

Unlike the bottle, which has remained the same since the 1924 redesign, the stopper has gone through numerous modifications. The original stopper was a small glass plug. The octagonal stopper, which became a brand signature, was created in 1924, when the bottle shape was changed. The 1950s gave the stopper a bevel cut and a larger, thicker silhouette. In the 1970s the stopper became even more prominent but, in 1986, it was re-proportioned so its size was more harmonious with the scale of the bottle.

The "pocket flacon," designed to be carried in a purse, was introduced in 1934. The price and container size were reduced to appeal to a broader customer base.

The bottle, over the decades, has itself become an identifiable cultural artifact, so much so that Andy Warhol chose to commemorate its iconic status in the mid-1980s with his pop art, silk-screened, Ads: Chanel.

A limited-edition, crimson red crystal glass bottle in the three editions of Chanel No. 5, namely Eau de Parfum, Parfum, and L'Eau, was launched for Christmas in 2018.

== Battle for control of Parfums Chanel ==
In 1924, Chanel agreed with the Wertheimer brothers Pierre and Paul, directors of the perfume house Bourjois, creating a new corporate entity, Parfums Chanel. The Wertheimers agreed to manage the production, marketing, and distribution of Chanel No. 5. The Wertheimers would receive a 70 percent share of the company, and Rheophile Bader, founder of the Paris department store Galeries Lafayette, would receive 20 percent. Bader had been instrumental in brokering the business connection by introducing Chanel to Pierre Wertheimer at the Longchamps races in 1922. For 10 percent of the stock, Chanel licensed her name to Parfums Chanel. She removed herself from involvement in all business operations. Later, unhappy with the arrangement, Chanel worked for more than twenty years to gain full control of Parfums Chanel. She said that Pierre Wertheimer was "the bandit who screwed me."

World War II brought with it the Nazi seizure of all Jewish-owned property and businesses, providing Chanel with the opportunity to gain control of Parfums Chanel and its most profitable product, Chanel No. 5. The Wertheimers were Jewish, and Chanel used her position as an "Aryan" to petition German officials to legalize her right to sole ownership.

On 5 May 1941, Chanel wrote to the government administrator charged with ruling on the disposition of Jewish financial assets. Her grounds for proprietary ownership were based on the claim that Parfums Chanel "is still the property of Jews" and had been legally "abandoned" by the owners.

I have an indisputable right of priority … the profits that I have received from my creations since the foundation of this business … are disproportionate … [and] you can help to repair in part the prejudices I have suffered in the course of these seventeen years.

Chanel was not aware that the Wertheimers, anticipating the forthcoming Nazi confiscations, had, in May 1940, legally turned control of Parfums Chanel over to a Christian, French businessman and industrialist Félix Amiot. At the end of World War II, Amiot returned Parfums Chanel to the Wertheimers.

=== Chanel maneuvers for control ===
Coco Chanel, 1920

By the mid-1940s, the worldwide sales of Chanel No. 5 amounted to nine million dollars annually. The monetary stakes were high, and Chanel was determined to wrest control of Parfums Chanel from the Wertheimers. Chanel planned to destroy customer confidence in the brand and tarnish its image, crippling its marketing and distribution. She stated that Chanel No. 5 was no longer the original fragrance created by "Mademoiselle Chanel," it was no longer being compounded according to her standards, and what was now being offered to the public was an inferior product that she could no longer endorse. Further, Chanel announced she would make available an authentic Chanel No. 5, to be named "Mademoiselle Chanel No. 5", offered to a group of select clients.

Chanel may have been unaware that the Wertheimers, who had fled from France to New York in 1940, had instituted a process whereby the quality of Chanel No. 5 would not be compromised. In America, the Wertheimers had recruited H. Gregory Thomas as a European emissary for Parfums Chanel. Thomas' mission was to establish the mechanisms required to maintain the quality of Chanel products, particularly its most profitable fragrance, Chanel No. 5. Thomas worked to ensure that the supply of key components, the oils of jasmine and tuberose, obtained exclusively from the fields of the valley of Siagne above the French town of Grasse, remained uninterrupted by war. Thomas was later promoted to position as president of Chanel US, a position he held for thirty-two years.

Chanel escalated her game plan by instigating a lawsuit against Parfums Chanel and the Wertheimers. The legal battle garnered wide publicity. The New York Times reported on 3 June 1946:

The suit asks that the French parent concern [Les Parfums Chanel] be ordered to cease manufacture and sale of all products bearing the name and restore to her the ownership and sole rights over the products, formulas and manufacturing process [on grounds of] "inferior quality".

The Wertheimers were aware of Chanel's collaboration during the Nazi occupation. Forbes magazine summarized the Wertheimers' dilemma: "[Pierre Wertheimer worries that] a legal fight might illuminate Chanel's wartime activities and wreck her image—and his business".

Ultimately, the Wertheimers and Chanel came to an agreement, re-negotiating the original 1924 contract. On 17 May 1947, Chanel received her share of the wartime profits of Chanel No. 5. Post-war, her share was two percent of all Chanel No. 5 sales worldwide. Her earnings were in the vicinity of US$25 million a year, making her at the time one of the richest women in the world. The new arrangement also gave Chanel the freedom to create new scents, which would be independent of Parfums Chanel, with the proviso that none would contain the number 5 in its name. She never acted on this opportunity.

== Advertising and marketing ==
=== 1920s and 1930s ===
Chanel's initial marketing strategy was to generate buzz for her new fragrance by hosting a promotional event. She invited a group of elite friends to dine with her in an elegant restaurant in Grasse where she surprised and delighted her guests by spraying them with Chanel No. 5. The official launch place and date of Chanel No. 5 was in her rue Cambon boutique in the fifth month of the year, on the fifth day of the month: 5 May 1921. She infused the shop's dressing rooms with the scent, and she gave bottles to a select few of her high society friends. The success of Chanel No. 5 was immediate. Chanel's friend Misia Sert exclaimed: "It was like a winning lottery ticket."

Parfums Chanel was the corporate entity established in 1924 to run the production, marketing, and distribution of the fragrance business. Chanel wanted to spread the sale of Chanel No. 5 from beyond her boutiques to the rest of the world. The first new market was New York City. The initial marketing was discreet and deliberately restricted. The first ad appeared in The New York Times on 16 December 1924. It was a small ad for Parfums Chanel announcing the Chanel line of fragrances available at Bonwit Teller, an upscale department store. In the ad, all the bottles were indistinguishable from each another, displaying all the Chanel perfumes available, Numbers 9, 11, 22, and the centerpiece of the line, No. 5. This was the extent of the advertising campaign in the 1920s and appeared only intermittently. In the US, the sale of Chanel No. 5 was promoted at perfume counters in high-end department stores. The Galeries Lafayette was the first retailer of the fragrance in Paris. In France itself, Chanel No. 5 was not advertised until the 1940s.

The first solo advertisement for Chanel No. 5 ran in The New York Times on 10 June 1934.

=== 1940s ===
In the early 1940s, when other perfume makers were increasing brand exposure, Parfums Chanel took a contrary track and decreased advertising. In 1939 and 1940, Chanel ads had been prominent. By 1941, there was almost no Chanel print advertising. Fragrance sales flourished during World War II. Perfume sales in the United States from 1940 to 1945 increased tenfold; Chanel No. 5 prospered, even without advertising.

During the war years the directors of Parfums Chanel came up with an innovative marketing idea. Expanding sales to the middle-class customer had been started in 1934 with the introduction of the pocket flacon. The plan was now to grow the market by selling the perfume at military post exchanges. It was a risky move that might have damaged the allure of the brand. But it did not: instead, it became a souvenir soldiers coveted for their sweetheart back home.

At the end of World War II, Coco Chanel's wartime collaboration threatened her with arrest and incarceration. In an attempt at damage control, she placed a sign in the window of her rue Cambon boutique, announcing that free bottles of Chanel No. 5 were available to American GIs. Soldiers waited in long lines to take a bottle of Paris luxe back home, and "would have been outraged if the French police had touched a hair on her head".

=== 1950s ===
In April 1952, American actress Marilyn Monroe appears for the first time on the cover of Life, and the article mentions her answer to the question, "What do you wear to bed?" and her reply, "Chanel No. 5." In an unpublished photo shoot for an article by Sidney Skolsky in Modern Screen in 1953, a Chanel No. 5 bottle is seen on her nightstand.

=== 1960s ===
In the 1960s, the glossy fashion magazines such as Vogue and Bazaar presented Chanel No. 5 as a required accessory. Print advertising for Chanel No. 5 was staid and conservative in both visuals and text, eschewing the energy and quirky aesthetic of the youth culture. Two catch-phrases alternated as ad copy: "Every woman alive wants Chanel No. 5" and "Every woman alive loves Chanel No. 5".

=== 1970s and 1980s ===
In the 1970s, the brand needed revitalization. For the first time it ran the risk of being labeled as "mass market" and passé. The fragrance was removed from drug stores and similar outlets. Outside advertising agencies were dropped. The rebranding was managed by Jacques Helleu, the artistic director for Parfums Chanel. Helleu chose French actress Catherine Deneuve as the new face of Chanel. Print ads showcased the iconic sculpture of the bottle. Television commercials were inventive mini-films with production values of surreal fantasy and seduction. Directed by Ridley Scott in the 1970s and 1980s, they "played on the same visual imagery, with the same silhouette of the bottle."

=== 1990s ===
In the 1990s, more money was reportedly spent advertising Chanel No. 5 than was spent for the promotion of any other fragrance. Carole Bouquet was the face of Chanel No. 5 during this decade. In the UK, this product was the first ever commercial aired on the newly launched Channel 5 network. In 1998, Estella Warren became the new spokesmodel for Chanel and shot two commercials with French director Luc Besson the latter which aired in 2001.

=== Since 2000 ===
In 2003, actress Nicole Kidman was enlisted to represent the fragrance. Film director Baz Luhrmann, brought in to conceive and direct a new advertising campaign featuring her, described his concept for what he titled No. 5 the Film as "a two-minute trailer ... for a film that has actually never been made, not about Chanel No. 5 but Chanel No. 5 is the touchstone". The eventual commercial, produced in two-minute and 30-second versions, cost £18 million, with Kidman paid US$3.7 million for her work.

It has been estimated, as of 2011, that between US$20–25 million was spent annually marketing Chanel No. 5.

In May 2012, the company announced that Brad Pitt would be the first male to advertise Chanel No. 5.

In 2013 Chanel ran an advertising campaign using a recorded interview with Marilyn Monroe in which she is asked about her use of Chanel No. 5. It featured Ed Feingersh's photograph of the actress splashing herself with a bottle of the perfume.

On her first cover of Life magazine in 1952, Marilyn Monroe famously said she wore only Chanel No. 5 to bed. A recording of her discussing the subject further with Georges Belmont for Marie Claire in 1960 has been found. She said people pose questions. "They ask me: 'What do you wear to bed? A pajama top? The bottoms of the pajamas? A nightgown?' So I said, 'Chanel No. 5', because it's the truth" she explained. "And yet, I don't want to say nude. But it's the truth!"

In October 2014, Luhrmann again collaborated with Chanel, creating a second advertising campaign for No. 5, this time starring Gisele Bündchen and Michiel Huisman. Throughout the film, singer Lo-Fang performs his rendition of You're the One That I Want.

On 17 February 2020, French actress Marion Cotillard was announced as the new face of Chanel No. 5. Her first commercial for the fragrance was released on 29 October 2020. It was directed by Johan Renck and featured Cotillard dancing in the moon with French ballet dancer Jérémie Bélingard while singing a cover of Lorde's "Team".

In 2024, Margot Robbie and Jacob Elordi starred in Chanel No. 5's new advertising film, directed by Luca Guadagnino, titled "See You at 5." Robbie plays the producer and titular star of Barbie. She tells Vogue that she thinks the woman who wears Chanel No. 5 is "powerful" and has "desires".

=== Flankers ===
Over decades, Chanel has released multiple expressions and flankers of No. 5, including Eau de Toilette, Parfum, and limited editions. Despite variations in concentration and presentation, the core aldehydic floral character has been preserved. Major commercially recognized flankers derived from the original composition include: Chanel No. 5 Eau de Toilette, Chanel No. 5 Eau Premiere, Chanel No. 5 L’Eau.

== The scent ==
=== Provenance of the recipe ===
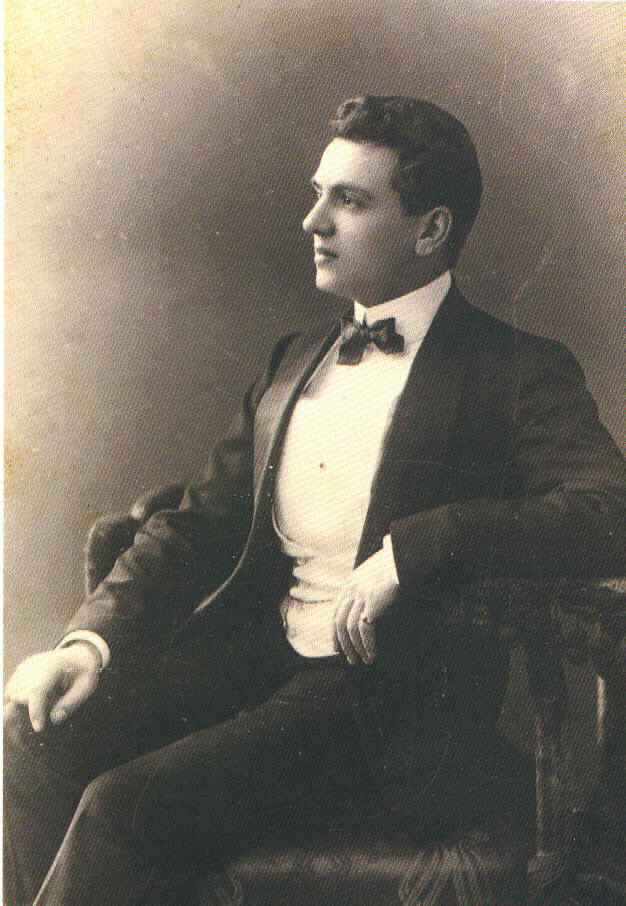
Le nez de Chanel: The perfumer Ernest Beaux (1881–1961)

Coco Chanel had wanted to develop a distinctly modern fragrance for some time prior to early-1920. At this time, Chanel's lover was Grand Duke Dmitri Pavlovich Romanov of Russia, the murderer of Rasputin. The duke introduced her to Ernest Beaux on the French Riviera. Beaux was the master perfumer at A. Rallet and Company, where he had been employed since 1898. The company was the official perfumer to the Russian imperial family, and "the imperial palace at St. Petersburg was a famously perfumed court." The favorite scent of the Tsarina Alexandra, composed specifically for her by Rallet in Moscow, had been an eau de cologne opulent with rose and jasmine named Rallet O-De-Kolon N°1 Vesovoi.

In 1912, Beaux created a men's cologne, Le Bouquet de Napoleon, to commemorate the 100th anniversary of the Battle of Borodino, a decisive battle in the Napoleonic Wars. Its success inspired Beaux to create a feminine counterpart, whose starting point was the chemical composition of aldehydic multiflores in Houbigant's immensely popular fragrance, Quelques Fleurs (1912).

His experiments with the aldehydes in Quelques Fleurs, resulted in a fragrance that he called Le Bouquet de Catherine. He intended to use the scent to celebrate, in 1913, the 300th anniversary of the Romanov dynasty. The debut of this new perfume was ill-timed commercially. World War I was approaching, and the tsarina and the perfume's namesake, the Empress Catherine, had both been German-born. Timing and unfavorable associations, combined with Le Bouquet de Catherine's hefty price tag, made it a commercial failure. An attempt to re-brand the perfume, as Rallet N°1 was unsuccessful, and the outbreak of World War I in 1914 effectively killed the product.

Beaux, who had affiliated himself with the Allies and the White Russian army, had spent 1917–1919 as a lieutenant stationed far north, in the last Arctic outpost of the continent, Arkangelsk, at Mudyug Island Prison where he interrogated Bolshevik prisoners. The polar ice, frigid seascape, and whiteness of the snowy terrain sparked his desire to capture the crisp fragrance of this landscape in a new perfume.

Beaux perfected what was to become Chanel No. 5 over several months in the late summer and autumn of 1920. He worked from the rose and jasmine base of Rallet N°1, altering it to make it cleaner, more daring, reminiscent of the polar freshness he had experienced during his war years. He experimented with modern synthetics, adding his own invention "Rose E.B." and notes derived from a new jasmine source, a commercial ingredient called Jasophore. The revamped, complex formula also increased the quantities of orris root, iris root, and natural musks.

The key was Beaux's use of aldehydes as aroma boosters. Beaux's student, Constantin Weriguine, said the aldehyde Beaux used had the clean note of the Arctic, "a melting winter note". A laboratory assistant, mistaking a full strength mixture for a ten percent dilution, had jolted the compound with a quantity of aldehyde never before used. Beaux prepared ten glass vials for Chanel's assessment. Numbered 1–5 and 20–24, each group a variation of the compound. "Number five. Yes," Chanel said later, "that is what I was waiting for. A perfume like nothing else. A woman's perfume, with the scent of a woman."

According to Chanel, the formula used to produce No. 5 has changed little since its creation, except for the necessary exclusion of natural civet and certain nitro-musks. The Eau de Parfum, though, is a different fragrance from the Parfum and the Eau de Toilette, and was composed in the eighties by Jacques Polge as a modern version of No. 5.

== Celebrity ambassadors ==
- Coco Chanel (1937)
- Suzy Parker (1957)
- Ali MacGraw (1966)
- Jean Shrimpton (1971)
- Catherine Deneuve (1969–1979)
- Carole Bouquet (1986–1997)
- Estella Warren (1998–2004)
- Nicole Kidman (2004–2005)
- Loredana Školaris (2005–2006)
- Audrey Tautou (2009)
- Brad Pitt (2012)
- Marilyn Monroe (2013)
- Gisele Bündchen (2014)
- Lily-Rose Depp (2016–2019)
- Marion Cotillard (2020–2024)
- Margot Robbie (2024–present)
