= Hungary water =

Historical European alcohol-based perfume

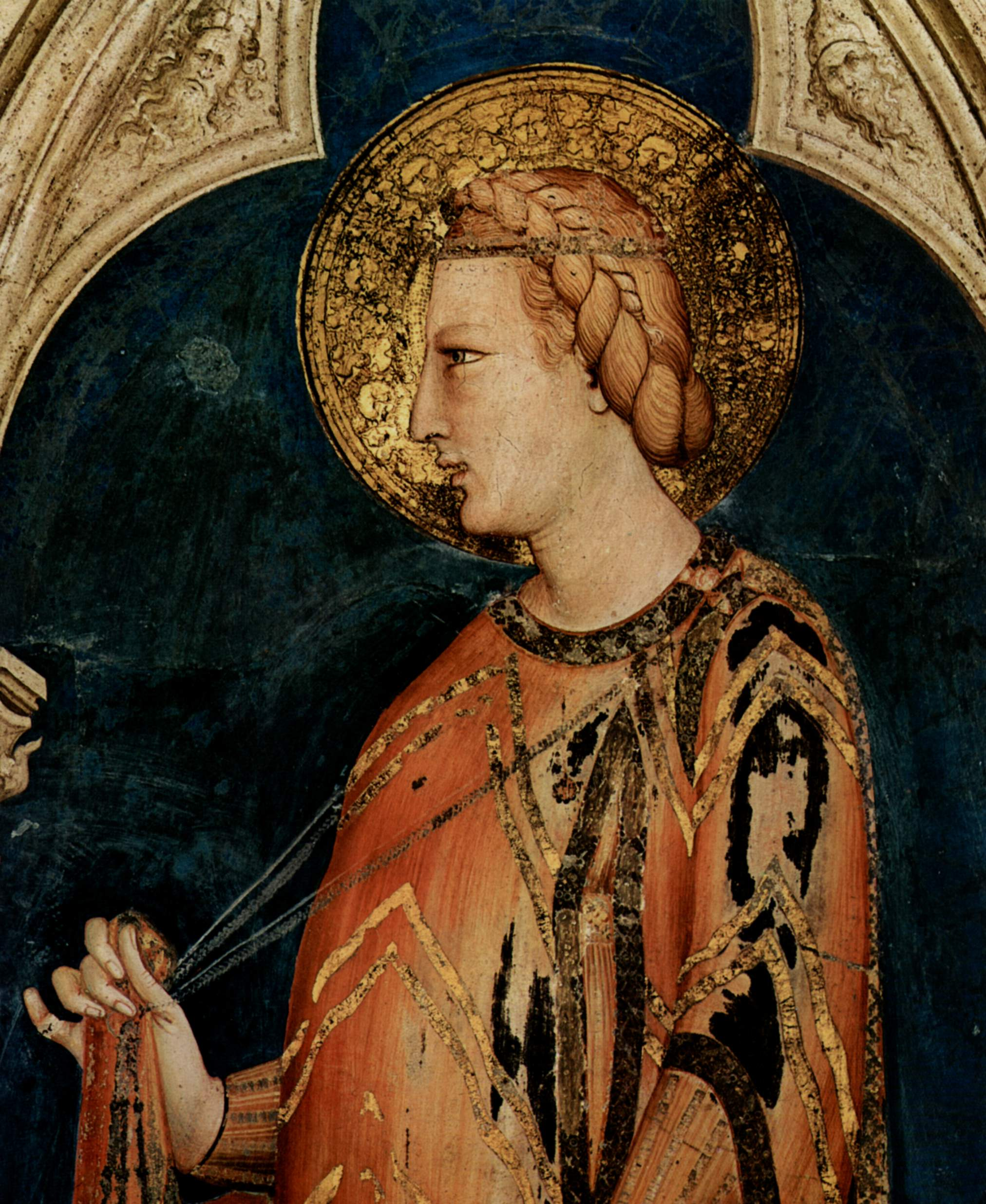
Saint Elisabeth of Hungary is sometimes reputed to have ordered the first modern perfume in Europe, called 'Hungary water'.

Hungary water (sometimes called "the Queen of Hungary's Water", Eau de la Reine de Hongrie, or "spirits of rosemary") was one of the first alcohol-based perfumes in Europe, primarily made with rosemary. The oldest surviving recipes call for distilling fresh rosemary and thyme with brandy, while later formulations contain wine, lavender, mint, sage, marjoram, costus, orange blossom and lemon.

== Origins ==
The exact date of the invention of Hungary water is lost to history, though some sources say it dates to 1370 or the late 14th century. It is equally unclear who in particular created it. According to legend, it was formulated at the command of the Queen Elizabeth of Hungary, sometimes identified as Queen Isabella of Hungary (Note: Historically, the name Isabella was a variant of Elisabeth, and in the period in question the two were sometimes interchangeable.) or in one document "Saint Elisabeth, Queen of Hungary". (Note: This may be a conflation of multiple individuals.) Some sources say that a hermit or monk-recluse first gave it to the Queen of Hungary, though most likely it was made by a court alchemist or a monk-alchemist. The water was given to the queen in order to help her headaches. These legends mostly date to the early to mid-17th century, so the details may have become confused in the intervening centuries. Some also claim traveling Romani people created it.

== Spread through Europe ==
According to legends, Hungary water first appeared outside of Hungary in 1370 when Charles V of France, who was famous for his love of fragrances, received some. Its use was popular across Europe for many centuries, and until Eau de Cologne appeared in the 18th century, it was the most popular fragrance and remedy applied.

=== French Hungary water ===
By the 18th century, French Hungary water from Montpellier was being touted over other variations of Hungary water, because of the quality of the rosemary used in the distillation. Advertisements in newspapers even warned against counterfeit versions of French Hungary water, explaining to potential buyers how to detect the difference in quality.

== Medicinal use ==
Hungary water was used during the late 17th century as a form of medicine. It was believed to have many uses such as helping to relieve a headache, toothache, or ringing ears. It was also used to help cleanse the body by clearing out several of the vital organs of impurities. Some even believed that it helped reduce blindness and the inability to hear. It was one of the medicines at the time that could be considered a "cure all" meaning that it would help with almost every ailment a person could face.

Hungary water was made through a distillation process that included concentrating the ingredients involved, which often included rosemary and wine. It was used for men, women, and children alike. The dosage was one or two sips of the medicine or a topical application, depending on whether the ailment was internal or external.

== Other uses ==
Similar to other herb- and flower-based products, Hungary water was also a valuable remedy, with recipes advising the user to wash with it or drink it in order to receive the most benefit. Other times, it was recommended to be added to other prepared distilled waters to use when washing one's face in order to help prevent irritation and breakouts. It was even thought to help people maintain youthful appearance and beauty.

== See also ==
- Toilet water
- Carmelite Water
- Florida Water
- Eau de Cologne
