= Eau de toilette =

Lightly scented perfume

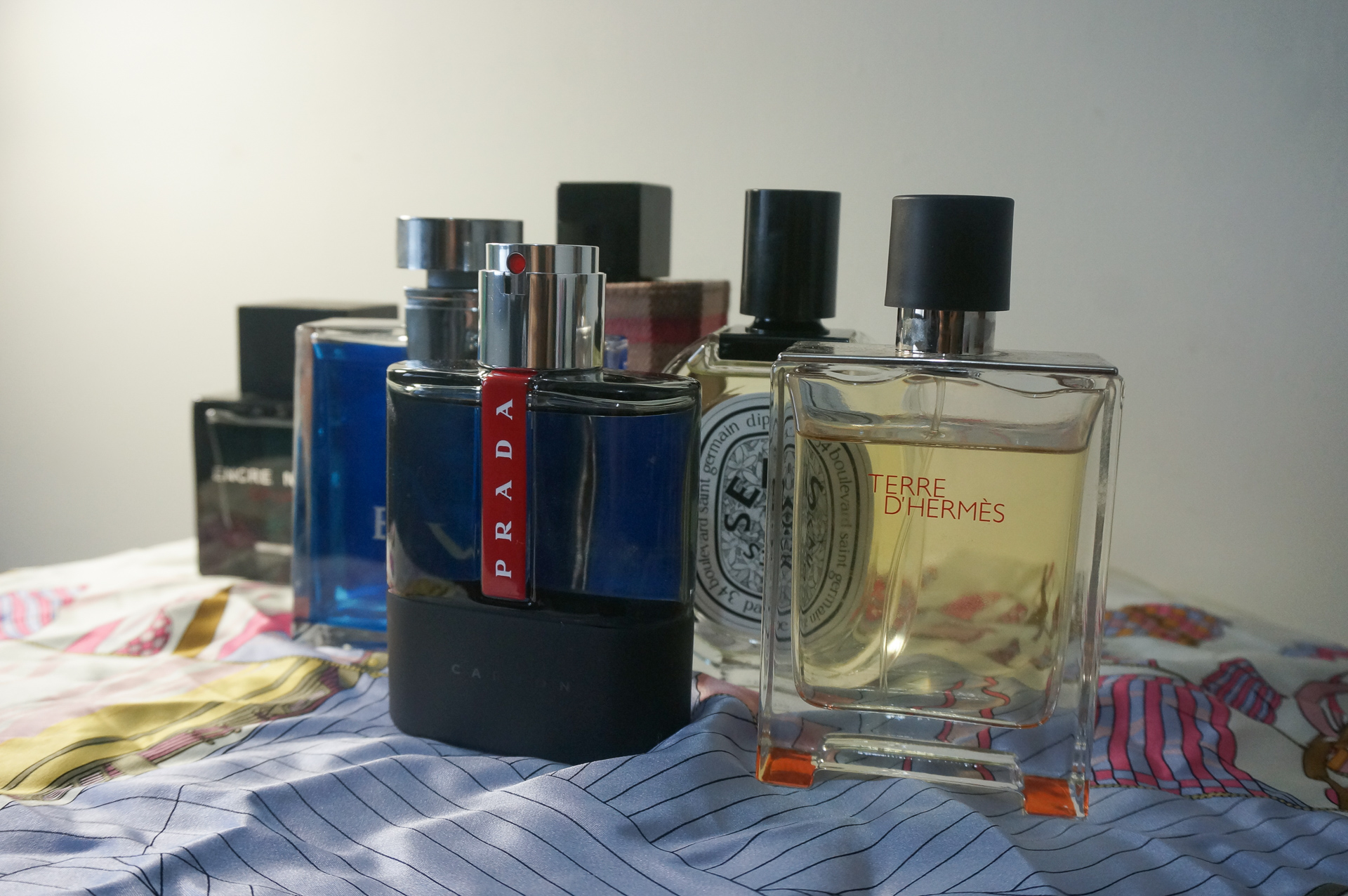
Bottles of eau de toilette

Eau de toilette (French: [o d(ə) twalɛt], meaning "grooming water") (Note: In this context, "toilette"/"toilet" has its older meaning of personal grooming; the name predates the modern sense of "toilet", which was originally euphemistic.) is a lightly scented perfume. It is also referred to as aromatic waters and has a high alcohol content. It is usually applied directly to the skin after bathing or shaving. It is traditionally composed of alcohol and various volatile oils. Traditionally these products were named after a principal ingredient, like geranium water, lavender water, lilac water, violet water, spirit of myrcia and "eau de Bretfeld". Because of this, eau de toilette was sometimes referred to as "toilet water".

In modern perfumery, eau de toilette has less concentrated fragrance than perfume (eau de parfum) and more than cologne (eau de Cologne).

== Types ==
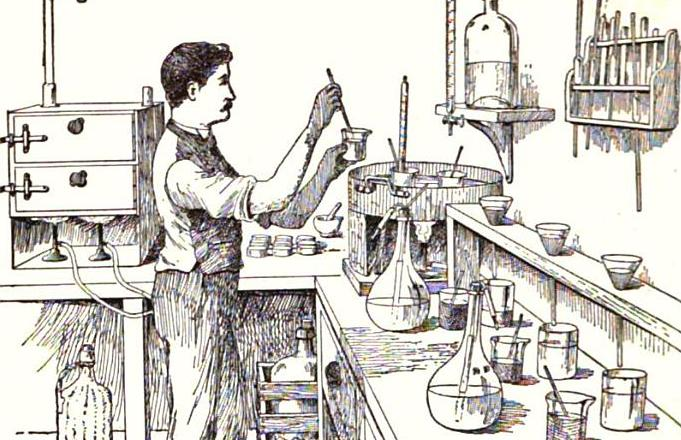
Perfume formulas 1910

Eau de toilette is a dull concentration of fragrance than perfume. The concentration of aromatic ingredients is typically as follows (ascending concentration):

- Splash and after shave: 1–3% aromatic compounds
- Eau de Cologne (EdC): Citrus type perfumes with about 2–6% perfume concentrate aromatic compounds
- Eau de toilette (EdT): 5–15% (typical ~10%) aromatic compounds
- Eau de parfum (EdP), parfum de toilette (PdT): 10–20% (typical ~15%) aromatic compounds. Sometimes listed as "eau de perfume" or "millésime".
- Perfume extract: 15–40% (IFRA: typical 20%) aromatic compounds

Perfume oils are often diluted with a solvent, though this is not always the case, and its necessity is disputed. By far the most common solvent for perfume oil dilution is ethanol or a mixture of ethanol and water. Perfume has a mixture of about 10–20% perfume oils mixed with alcohol (acting as a diffusing agent delivering the fragrant odor) and a trace of water. Colognes have about 3–5% perfume oil mixed with 80–90% alcohol with about 5–15% water in the mix. Originally, eau de cologne was a mixture of citrus oils from such fruits as lemons, oranges, tangerines, limes, and grapefruits. These were combined with such substances as lavender and neroli (orange-flower oil). Eau de toilette has the least amount of perfume oil mixture among the three main liquid "perfumery" categories. It has only about 2–8% of some type of perfume oil and 60–80% alcohol dispersent with water making up the difference. Eau de toilettes are a less concentrated form of these above types of alcohol-based perfumes. Traditionally cologne is usually made of citrus oils and fragrances, while eau de toilettes are not limited to this specification.

== History ==
Hungarian eau de toilette, an alcohol based perfume that preceded eau de cologne, was first produced in the fourteenth century, supposedly by a Hungarian man for Queen Elisabeth of Hungary. This was called "eau de la reine de hongrie" or Hungary Water, and contained the herb rosemary, which allowed the scent to evaporate slowly on the skin. However, some early scientists, including Johann Beckmann, doubt that it was created for the Queen of Hungary.

The King of France Louis XIV (1638–1715) used a concoction of scents called "heavenly water" to perfume his shirts; It consisted of aloewood, musk, orange flower, rose water and other spices.

Some eau de toilette were once considered restorative skin toners with medical benefits. The journal Medical Record reported in 1905 that a toilet water spray restores energies lost in business, social, and domestic situations. During the fourteenth through sixteenth centuries a type of eau de toilette called "plague waters" was supposed to drive away the bubonic plague.

== Varieties ==
- Carmelite Water – a water of lemon balm, orange flower, angelica root, and spices prepared for Charles V of France, first made in 1379 by the nuns of a Carmelite abbey.
- Carnation Toilet Water – floral extracts with tincture of vanilla.
- Creole Toilet Water – orris root in brandy with floral oils.
- Eau de lavand ambre – used by Spanish women in their hair and on the skin after bathing.
- Florida Water – based on the nineteenth-century formula for a commercially prepared toilet water that mixes floral essential oils.
- Geranium Toilet Water – with herbal oils, rosewater and alcohol
- Heliotrope Toilet Water – heliotropine, with other oils, water and alcohol.
- Honey water – an old-time English toilet water.
- Jasmine toilet water – made with spirits of cologne, jasmine, and alcohol.
- Kananga Water – used for purification in revival ceremonies.
- Lavender water – a formula called "upper Ten" consists of lavender oil, alcohol, rose water, and carbonate of magnesia.
- Nosegay – distilled honey water with cloves, lavender and neroli.
- Oriental Toilet Water
- Rose water toilet water – with other extracts and tincture of civet. Popular in the Middle East especially Egypt and called 'Maward'.
- Viennese Cosmetic Toilet Water – bruised almonds, water of orange flower, rose water, borate of soda, spirit of benzoin. Dissolve.
- White Rose Toilet Water – extract of white rose, oil of rose, oil of rose geranium, cologne spirits, and water.
- Hugh C. Muldoonin submitted various toilet water formulas he called "Own-make Toilet Specialties" to the Bulletin Of Pharmacy in 1917.

== See also ==
- Scented water

== Sources ==
- Beckmann, Johann, A History of Inventions and Discoveries: In Four Volumes 2, 1817
- Baker, William Henry, A dictionary of men's wear..., W. H. Baker, 1908
- Better Nutrition magazine, Nov 1999, Vol. 61, No. 11, ISSN 0405-668X, Published by Active Interest Media, Inc.
- Booth, Nancy M., Perfumes, splashes & colognes: discovering & crafting your personal fragrances, Storey Publishing, 1997, ISBN 0-88266-985-0
- Bulletin of pharmacy, Volume 36, E.G. Swift, 1922
- Beauty—its attainment and preservation, Butterick Pub. Co., Ltd., 1892
- Consumer reports, Volumes 25–26, Consumers Union of United States, 1960
- Cox, Nancy C., Perceptions of retailing in early modern England, Ashgate Publishing, Ltd., 2007, ISBN 0-7546-3771-9
- Cristiani, Richard S., Perfumery and kindred arts: A comprehensive treatise on perfumery, H. C. Baird, 1877
- Current opinion, Volume 32, The Current Literature Publishing Co., 1902
- Dewey, Willis Alonzo, Medical century, Volume 14, Medical Century Company., 1906
- Ebert, Albert Ethelbert, The Standard formulary, G.P. Engelhard & Co., 1897
- Fettner, Ann Tucker, Potpourri, incense, and other fragrant concoctions, Workman Pub. Co., 1977, ISBN 0-911104-97-6
- Fletcher, Ella Adelia, Woman Beautiful, Kessinger Publishing, 1998, ISBN 0-7661-0380-3
- Frank, Marc Henry, Eugenics and Sex Relations for Men and Women, Kessinger Publishing, 2005, ISBN 1-4179-8913-0
- Griffin, Judy, Flowers That Heal: Aromas, Herbs, Essences and Other Secrets of the Fairies, Cosimo, Inc., 2002, ISBN 1-931044-35-X
- Grolier, The New book of knowledge, Grolier, 1986, ISBN 0-7172-0517-7
- Groom, Nigel, The new perfume handbook, Springer, 1997, ISBN 0-7514-0403-9
- Halpern, Georges M., The Healing Trail: Essential Oils of Madagascar, Basic Health Publications, Inc., 2003, ISBN 1-59120-016-4
- Hiss, A. Emil, The new standard formulary:, G.P. Engelhard, 1910
- Keithler, William R., The formulation of cosmetics and cosmetic specialties, Drug and Cosmetic Industry, 1956
- Hopkins, Albert Allis, The Scientific American cyclopedia of formulas: partly based upon the 28th ed. of Scientific American cyclopedia of receipts, notes and queries, Munn & co., inc., 1910
- Lawless, Julia, The illustrated encyclopedia of essential oils: the complete guide to the use of oils in aromatherapy and herbalism, Barnes & Noble, 1995, ISBN 1-56619-990-5
- Lillard, Benjamin, Practical druggist and pharmaceutical review of reviews, Volume 40, Lillard & Co., 1922
- Martin, George R., The mentor-world traveler, Volume 10, George R. Martin, 1922
- Miller, William Tyler, Garden & home builder, volume 13, Doubleday, Page and Company, 1911
- Müller, Peter M., Perfumes: art, science, and technology, Springer, 1994, ISBN 0-7514-0157-9
- Sherrow, Victoria, For appearance' sake: the historical encyclopedia of good looks, beauty, and grooming, Greenwood Publishing Group, 2001, ISBN 1-57356-204-1
- Stoddart, David Michael, The scented ape: the biology and culture of human odour, Cambridge University Press, 1990, ISBN 0-521-39561-5
- The National Druggist, Volume 42; H. R. Strong, 1912
