= Klosterfrau Melissengeist =

Variation of Carmelite Water marketed by Klosterfrau Healthcare Group

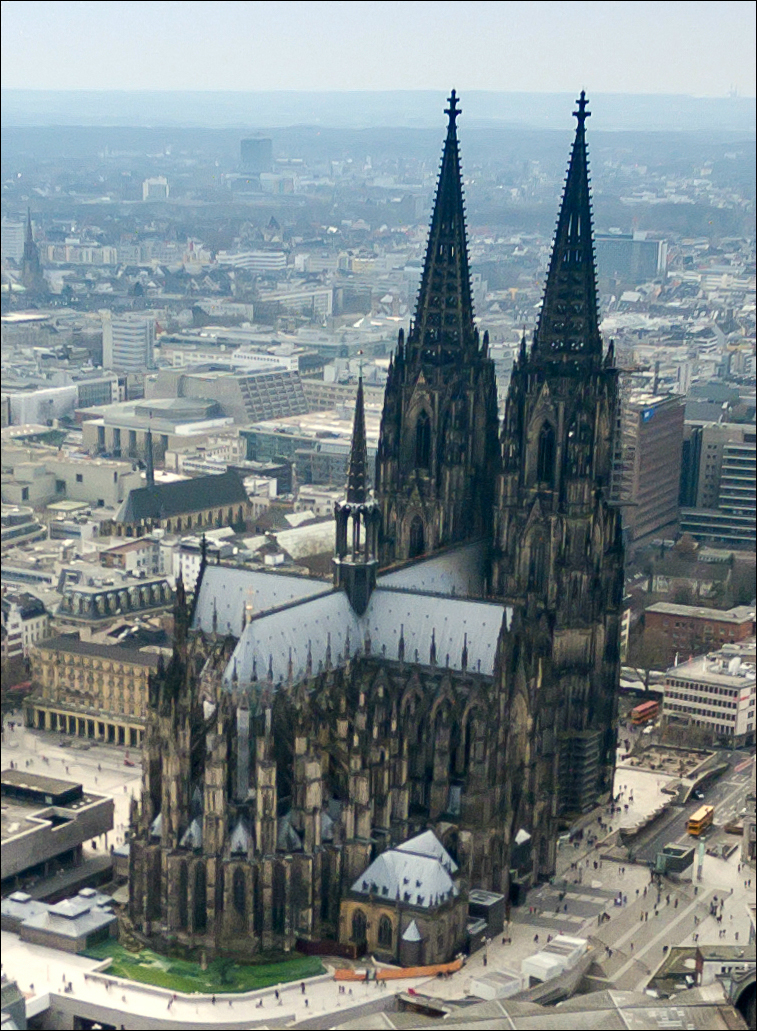
Cologne Cathedral, where Maria Clementine Martin originally created Klosterfrau Melissengeist

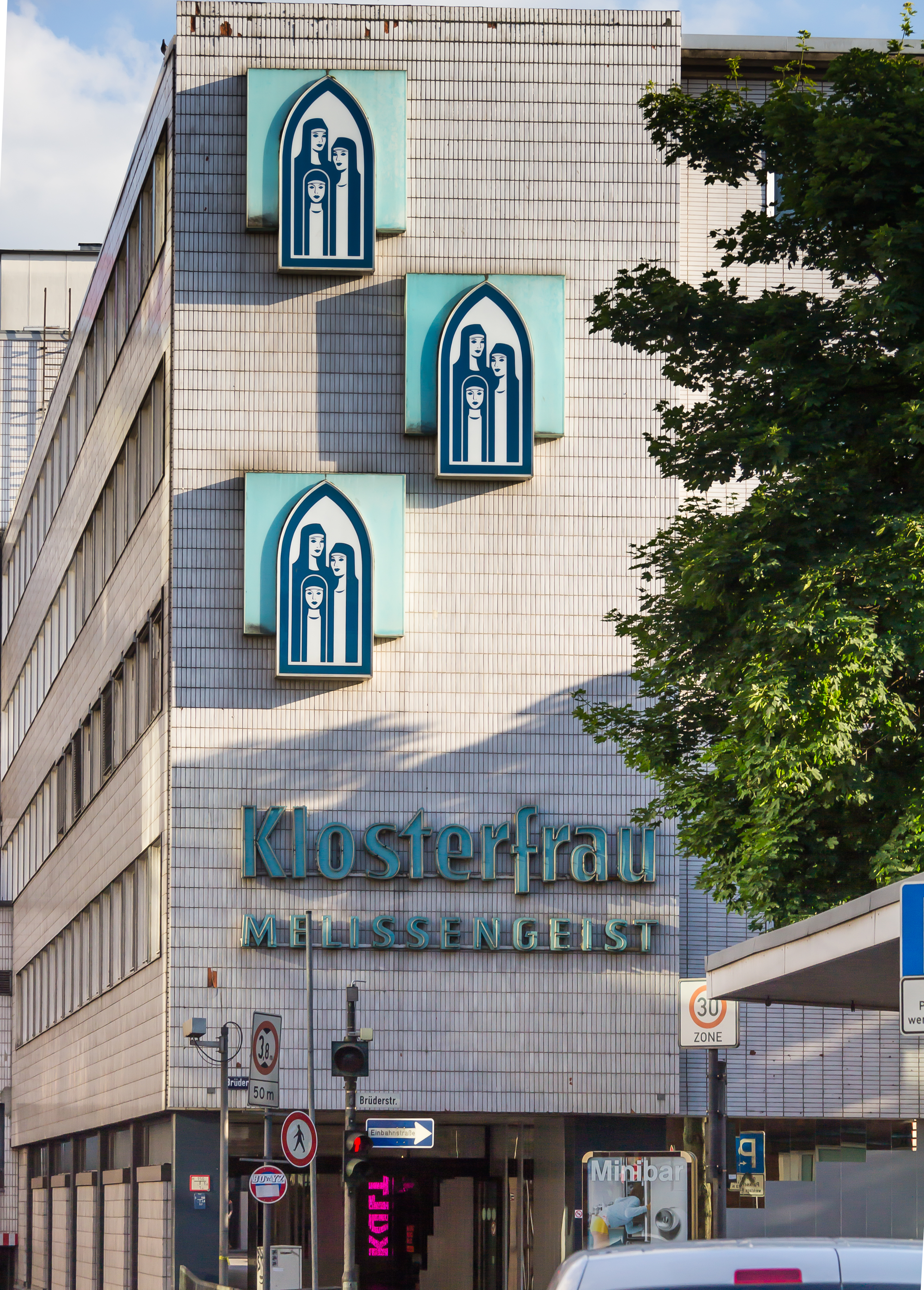
Klosterfrau Melissengeist

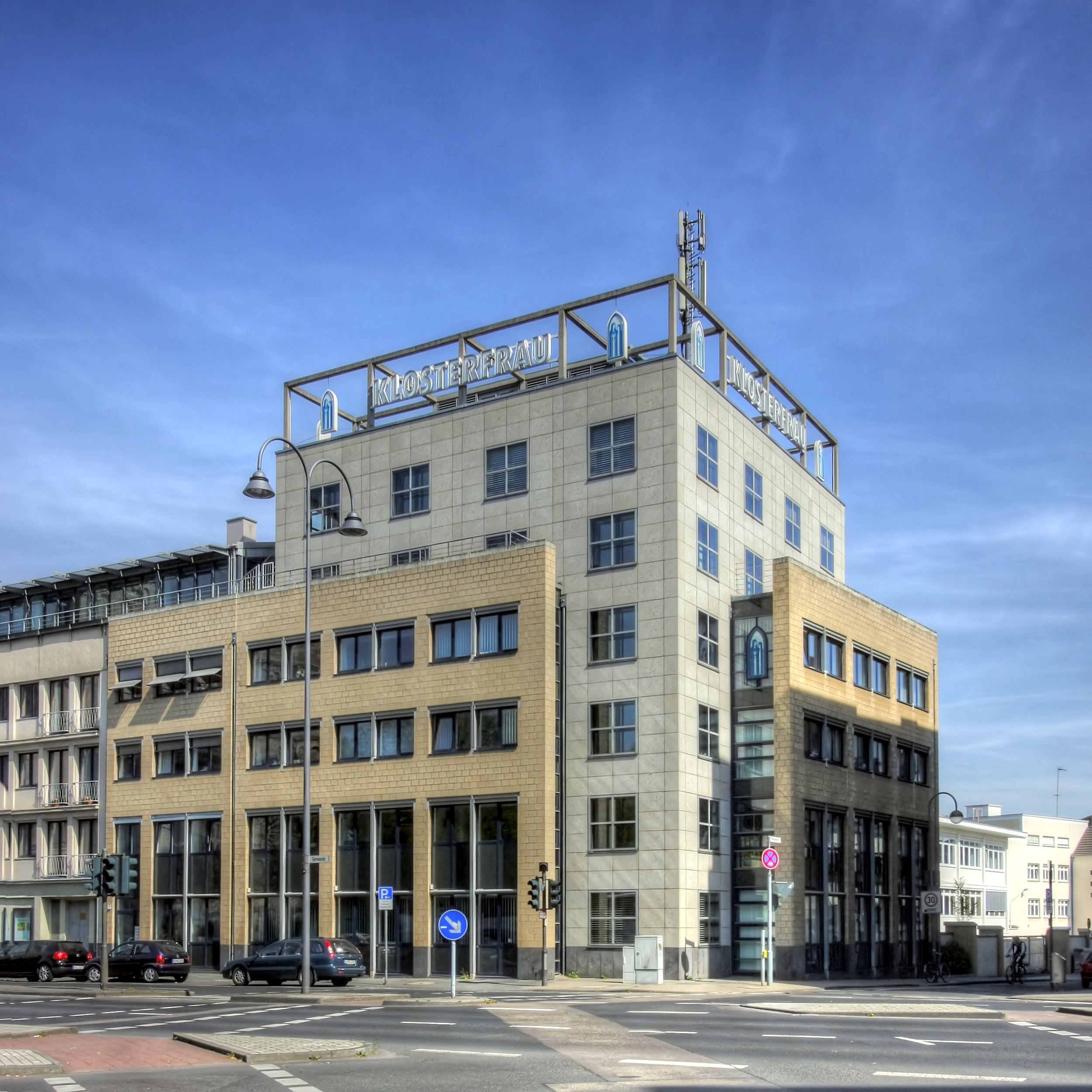
Headquarter, Cologne, Germany, Klosterfrau Healthcare Group

Klosterfrau Melissengeist, also referred to as Klostermelissen or Melissengeist, is a German variation of Carmelite Water currently sold by Klosterfrau Healthcare Group as an alternative remedy for the improvement of general health and wellbeing. Melissengeist derives its name from one of its principal ingredients, Melissa officinalis L., commonly known as lemon balm. It also includes the essential oils of thirteen medicinal plants such as gentian, cardamom, cinnamon, and ginger, which are all mixed in a 79% ethanol solution. Since its origin in the 1800s in Germany, it has been used as an alternative medicine to treat an array of health issues like colds or gastrointestinal issues.

== Origin ==
Klosterfrau Melissengeist was created in the 1800s in Cologne, Germany by the nun Maria Clementine Martin (* 1775, † 1843), who settled in Cologne in 1825. She appeared as a manufacturer of eau de cologne at the address Auf der Litsch No. 1. It eventually became the first traditional medicinal product to be approved in the European Union. Her company Klosterfrau was founded with the entry on the 23 May 1826 in the municipal register (company register) and located near Cologne Cathedral, where she distilled and refined the remedy herself. She branded her product "Real Spanish Carmelite-Melissa Water" with the image of a nun, and many vendors followed suit in hopes of copying her product.

In 1831 she deposited her "factory mark" with the Council of Trade Experts of the City of Cologne, which included the Prussian eagle and the coat of arms of the Carmelite order. The "Klosterfrau" trademark, which was only registered after the trademark law came into force, allows the history of its origin to be traced back. In 1835, the government rejected their application to grant a monopoly on lemon balm spirit in Prussia because of the freedom of trade. Likewise, she was unsuccessful in her application to legally recognize her Carmelite spirit as a medicine.

In order to become internationally known, she took part in the art and industry exhibition in 1838, which the trade association in Cologne organized on the Heumarkt. In 1842, advertisements appeared in the Kölnische Zeitung about their lemon balm spirit. In 1843, shortly before her death, she wrote her will and made Peter Gustav Schaeben the heir to her fortune. Schaeben (* 1815, † 1885) had worked as an assistant for Martin and became the sole heir of the company, which he expanded considerably and expanded the distribution of the products worldwide. His son Robert Schaeben (* 1863, † 1944) continued to run the company between 1885 and 1933 before it went bankrupt. By the end of her life in 1843, Klosterfrau was steadily growing and had branches in Bonn, Aachen, and Berlin.

=== Doerenkamp family ===
Wilhelm Doerenkamp (* 1882, † 1972), who had previously worked in the automobile trade, joined the Klosterfrau company as a limited partner in 1929 and acquired the company from bankruptcy as the main creditor. Doerenkamp concentrated on the production of melissa spirit, which could be sold almost without competition.

The subsidiary Klosterfrau Berlin GmbH was founded in 1962 to cope with the increasing demand. After Doerenkamp's death, the Wilhelm Doerenkamp Foundation was set up in Chur, Switzerland, on 17 November 1972 in order to secure his life's work and jobs. As a holding company, it forms the supervisory body for the various country and company groups. His daughter Hildegard Doerenkamp was the beneficiary of the foundation until her death in 2011 and since then his granddaughter Martine Eloy (born in 1957).

== Corporate structure ==
The company currently employs 530 people at its headquarters in Cologne. Production has mainly taken place in Berlin since 1971 with around 190 employees. The entire company has (as of 2006) 1025 employees and a worldwide turnover of 700 million euros. The Klosterfrau Group was renamed the Klosterfrau Healthcare Group in 2006.

Through the acquisition of several companies, the company further developed into a group of companies, a leading provider in the field of self-medication (cf. OTC). The core business consists of the manufacture and distribution of health products and cosmetics (after the takeover of the French cosmetics manufacturer Maria Galland Paris in the 1980s). The Klosterfrau Group also includes the companies Divapharma GmbH and Cassella-med GmbH & Co. KG.

In 2006, the Klosterfrau Group acquired the entire brand portfolio of Lichtwer Healthcare GmbH & Co. KG and the associated drug approvals. Products acquired include Hepar SL forte, Jarsin, Kwai, Kaveri, Euminz, Ameu and Bedan. It was agreed not to disclose the purchase price. Another subsidiary is Artesan Pharma GmbH & Co. KG with around 200 employees in two plants at the company's headquarters in Lüchow. Artesan is a contract manufacturer and manufactures medicines in pill and ointment form, homeopathics and dietary supplements; Another focus is galenics. Sales cooperations existed with the Swiss Ricola and Condomi.

== Products ==
=== Klosterfrau Melissengeist ===
The main product of the group is Klosterfrau Melissengeist, an alcoholic distillate from 13 medicinal plants, including the eponymous lemon balm (Melissa officinalis, also known as lemon balm). Parisian Carmelites developed the recipe in 1611, the nun Maria Clementine Martin distilled the remedy in her business "Maria Clementine Martin Klosterfrau" founded in 1826 at the foot of Cologne Cathedral. The Bonn medical professor Johann Friedrich Christian Herless certified their water in 1827 as "both with regard to the pure spirit of wine used for this purpose and the ingredients used for the distillation from the class of aromatic-ethereal medicinal plants of proven healing powers and with regard to the preparation, of very excellent quality and practicality. and therefore especially recommended for internal and external use".

The term Klostermelisse is a trademark of the Klosterfrau company. It is claimed that internal use to strengthen nervous complaints, difficulty falling asleep, weather sensitivity and uncomplicated colds; when feeling unwell, to promote the function of the stomach and intestines (e.g. in the event of a feeling of fullness and flatulence) and externally to support the skin's blood circulation, e.g. would be indicated for sore muscles and muscle tension.

The drug with an alcohol content of 79% is registered in Germany as a traditional drug; this means that the areas of application are based exclusively on experience from many years of use. According to the statutory package insert, it has not yet been possible to prove in scientific studies how the individual ingredients of Klosterfrau Melissengeist work.

The lemon balm spirit is made from a mixture of 13 medicinal herbs from up to

- 7.14 g elecampane rootstock
- 7.14 g angelica root
- 7.14 g gentian root
- 7.14 g ginger rootstock
- 7.14 g bitter orange peels
- 5.36 g lemon balm leaves
- 3.21 g cinnamon bark
- 2.85 g galangal rootstock
- 2.85 g cloves
- 0.71 g Black pepper fruits
- 0.71 g nutmeg seeds
- 0.36 g cinnamon flowers
- 0.10 g cardamom seeds

per liter of finished medicinal product, the distillation medium is ethanol 96% (v/v) and purified water.

The total daily dose should not exceed 25 ml and should only be used from the age of 18 and not during pregnancy, alcoholism or liver damage.

=== Miscellaneous products ===
A total of over 200 other products are sold under the Klosterfrau product name, including cough drops, rubbing alcohol, cold baths, vitamin and herbal dragees.

== Literature ==
- Georg Schwedt, Helmut Heckelmann: Kölnisch Wasser und Melissengeist. Die Geschichte der Klosterfrau Maria Clementine Martin (1775–1843). Eine kritische Rückschau. Berlin, Munich, Vienna: LIT 2019 (= Persönlichkeit im Zeitgeschehen, Bd. 10), ISBN 978-3-643-14365-5
- Helmut Heckelmann: Maria Clementine Martin (1775–1843). MV-Wissenschaft, Munich.
- Helmut Heckelmann: Maria Clementine Martin (1775–1843). In: Forschungen zur Volkskunde. Issue 62, MV-Wissenschaft, Munich 2015, ISBN 978-3-95645-480-6 (also dissertation, Faculty of Law, University of Regensburg, 2014)
- Ursula Köhler-Lutterbeck: Momente der Entscheidung, Folge 11: Mit Gott und den Preußen. In: Die Zeit. Nr. 20, 2003, (zeit.de)
