= Shanghai Vive =

Chinese cosmetics brand

- Native name: 雙妹
- Industry: Fashion
- Founded: 1898
- Founder: Fook Tien Fung
- Headquarters: Shanghai, China
- Products: Cosmetics and perfumes
- Parent: Shanghai Jahwa Corporation
- Website: http://www.shanghaivive.com.cn

Shanghai Vive or Shuangmei (simplified Chinese: 双妹; traditional Chinese: 雙妹) is a Chinese luxury cosmetics brand.

Shuangmei — translated into English as Two Girls — originated as a trade mark of The House of Kwong Sang Hong Limited, founded in 1898 in Hong Kong, and stationed in Shanghai in 1903. Under Communist China's public-private partnership policy, the Shanghai branch of Kwong Sang Hong was subsumed into the Shanghai Jahwa Corporation in 1956, and the Shuangmei brand gradually discontinued in Mainland China.

In 2010, Shanghai Jahwa Corporation has restarted the Shuangmei brand, and adopted the English name Shanghai Vive; the English translation Two Girls cannot be used as it remains a trade mark of Kwong Sang Hong in Hong Kong.

== See also ==
- Florida Water
