= Kananga Water =

Cologne

Kananga water is a cologne based on a foundation of the essential oil of Ylang Ylang (also known as Cananga odorata). Plantations for producing kananga water were established by the British in Jamaica in the 19th century. Kananga water, like Florida Water, is used in various rituals including spiritual cleaning, and appeasing the spirits of the dead. Its use is particularly common among people of the African diaspora.

Peter L. Patrick in his list of "Some Recent Jamaican Creole Words" (an earlier version of which appeared in the journal American Speech in Fall 1995, 70(3):227-264.) suggests that the origin of the word is possibly from Kikongo kalunga '(Angolan) for lake, sea, ocean', Laman 1936, 207; but also in senses 'proper name' and 'in the depths, right at the bottom, in the heart of the earth'. Patrick also notes Bettelheim (1979, 323), as quoted in Ryman (1984, 84), that "kalunga is also the name of an underworld deity and/or the home of this god".

This false etymology is easily disputed, however. Kananga water clearly gets its name from its main component, Ylang Ylang, also known as "cananga odorata".

As far as reporting on the use of the water is concerned, Patrick reports that it has been quoted by Patterson (1964) as being a type of "holy water" that is used for purification in revival ceremonies. Quoting Patterson "male church leader, Shepherd John, cleansing a sinful woman: "'Bring de robe an' de cananga water an' call de Water Mother.' The period of cleansing began with a purity bath. [Shepherd John] sprinkled some of the cananga water over the room, then poured the rest in the tub. Then the water mother came forward, helped her in the tub, and bathed her from the neck downwards."

== Sources ==
- Laman, Karl E. 1936. Dictionnaire Kikongo-Francais. Brussels. Rpt. 2 vols. Ridgewood, NJ: Gregg, 1964.
- Patterson, Orlando. 1964. The Children of Sisyphus. Essex: Longman. Rpt. 1982.
- Ryman, Cheryl. 1984. "Kumina: Stability and change." Afro-Caribbean Institute of Jamaica Research Review 1: 81-128. Kingston: ACIJ.
