= Maria Clementine Martin =

German business woman

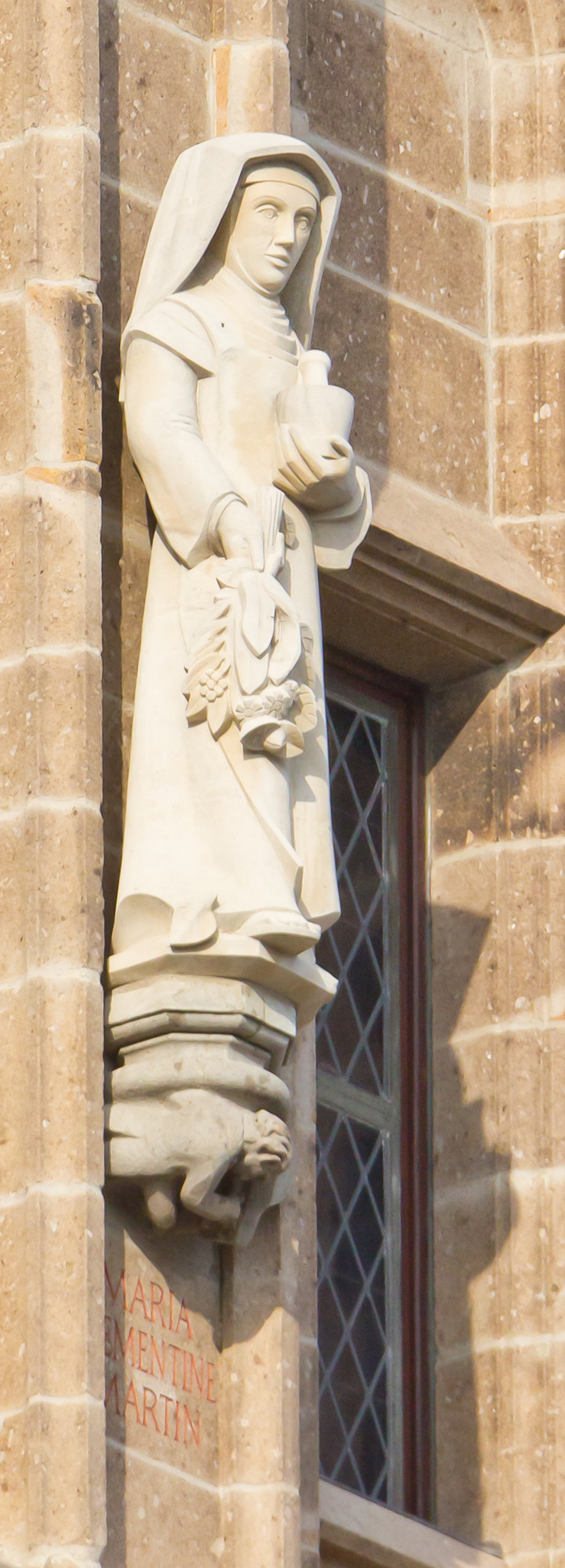
Statue of Maria Clementine Martin at Cologne City Hall

Maria Clementine Martin, birth name Wilhelmine Martin (5 May 1775 – 9 August 1843) was the inventor of Klosterfrau Melissengeist, an alcoholic extract of herbs.

== Life ==
Born in Brussels, Martin was the daughter of the Imperial-royal officer Johann Heinrich de Martin and Christine de Martin von Mergenthal. In 1783, her parents moved to Jever. She lived there until she entered the Order of the Annunciation of the Blessed Virgin Mary convent of Sankt Anna in Coesfeld on 2 October 1792 at the age of 17. After the Reichsdeputationshauptschluss of 1803, the monastery was seized by secularisation and abolished. Martin then went to the monastery of Glane near Gronau. This monastery was shared by the Annuntiates with Franciscan Sisters. As a result, it was affected by a decree of Napoleon in 1811, according to which all Franciscan convents were to be dissolved. This was accompanied by economic impoverishment for the sisters. They received little compensation in the form of annual pensions.

Martin finally arrived in the Paterskerk in Tienen in Province of Brabant via her native city of Brussels. There is evidence of a stay there until 1815. According to various sources, after the Battle of Waterloo on 18 June 1815, Martin cared for the wounded German soldiers under Field Marshal General Blücher, possibly also in battle. Heckelmann assigns descriptions of this kind rather to the legends about Martin, but is of the opinion that she was active in the Prussian military hospitals and was therefore honoured by King Frederick William III with an annual life annuity of 160 thalers.

The stay from 1815 to 1821 is not documented with certainty. According to Martin's own information, which is not precisely determined, she lived for eight years in Brussels in the convent of the Carmelite Sisters. However, no other records of this have survived.

A stay in Münster from 1821 to 1825, on the other hand, is considered certain. She lived there in a house belonging to the Domkapitel Münster. Little is known about her work there. However, in 1821 she was investigated for medical bungling and quackery. In her submissions on the matter, she wrote that from her time in Coesfeld she had experience of the healing procedure for "fistula and cancer damage" taught in the monastery there and asked for permission to use it. This was denied to her and the investigations, the result of which is not known, were not stopped at first. No evidence was found of a healing procedure against fistulous and cancerous diseases used in the Annuntiatinnenkloster Sankt Anna in Coesfeld.

=== Move to Cologne ===
In the course of 1825, Martin came to the domnah house Auf der Litsch 1. There she probably nursed the sick 86-year-old cathedral vicar Hermann Gumpertz (b. 1739), whose house it was. In this building, she produced Eau de Cologne by means of a simple distillation process, which she advertised in the Kölnische Zeitung on 6 November 1825:

Ein sich selbst empfehlend ächtes Kölnische Wasser, ist zu haben auf der Litsch Nro. 1, die große Flasche zu 6 Sgr. 3Pf.

The company was founded with the entry on 23 May 1826 in the municipal magistrate's register (commercial register) under the name "Maria Clementine Martin Klosterfrau".

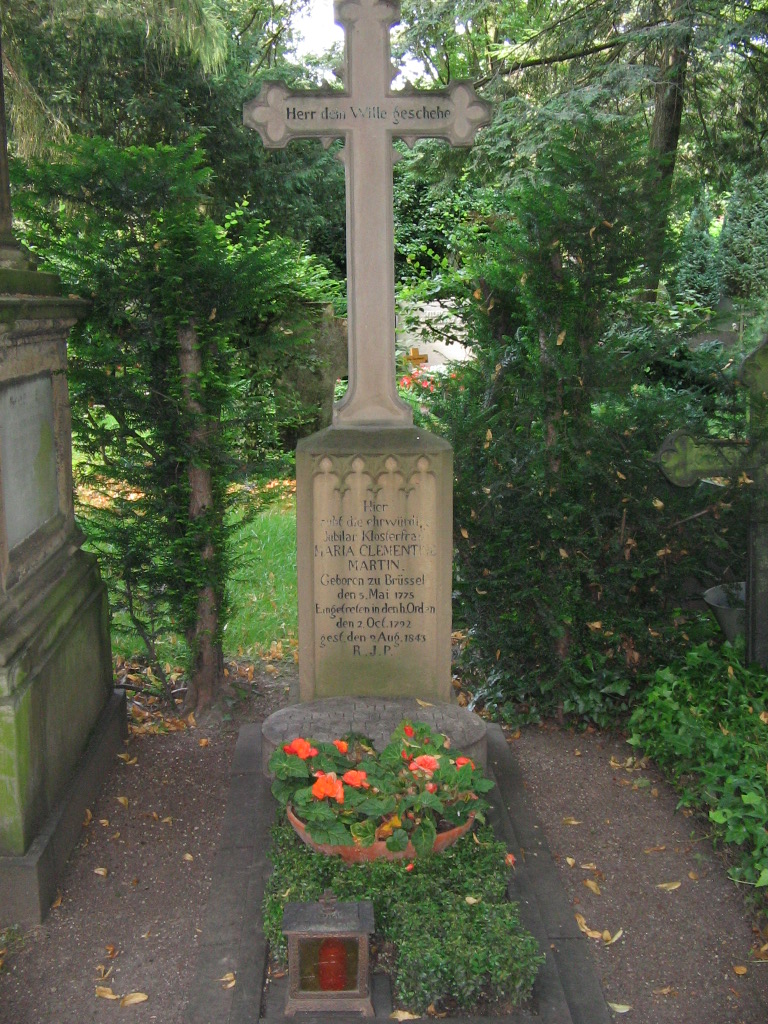
Martin's gravesite at Melaten-Friedhof in Cologne

In 1827, Martin moved into a house at Domhofgasse 19, which she rented from the Cologne Cathedral Chapter and bought in the 1830s. It was from there that she first advertised a Carmelite spirit she produced, with an advertisement in the Kölnische Zeitung of 17 June 1827. At the same time, in addition to the aforementioned cologne, she offered a lavender water and a vinegar de quatres voleurs, which was supposed to protect against "pestilential diseases". This name originated from an account according to which, during the French wars, thieves looted corpses on the battlefields, whereby the rubs with the antiseptic agent were said to have protected them from infection by the plague and other diseases.

=== Lemon balm spirit ===
On 5 July 1828, Martin wrote to the Cologne government and asked for "examination and certification of the quality of the lemon balm water produced by her by the royal medical authority". She stated that she had worked for a longer period of time as a "manufacturer" in a convent that financed itself through the production of Carmelite water. She also stated that from her eight-year stay in the Carmelite convent in Brussels she had "the key to this specific as well as any member of this order. Helmut Heckelmann doubts this information and found no evidence that a Carmelite or Melissa spirit was ever produced in the monasteries of Coesfeld and Glane. Nor is there any evidence that Martin belonged to the convent of the Brussels Carmelite nuns, or that a melissa spirit was produced there. The origin of the recipe for the lemon balm spirit differs in this respect from Martin's information, but also from widespread reports She says she learned the secret recipe for "genuine Spanish lemon balm water" in a monastery pharmacy in Westphalia.

On the other hand, it is undisputed that Martin possessed the ability to produce a melissa spirit comparable to the Carmelite spirit from Regensburg, which was also available in Cologne at the time and dominated the market. Nevertheless, the Koblenz medical authority, to which the Cologne authority had handed over the case for a decision, refused to test and protect their product: a chemical analysis or a comparative test against the competing product from Regensburg was not possible because of the similarity of such products. Moreover, any pharmacist could produce the comparable Alcoolat de melissa compositum, which was also approved as a remedy, which is why the authority's concern with the prescriptions of monastic clergymen lacked the necessary relevance.

=== Use of the Prussian eagle ===
About a year after this negative decision, Martin approached King Friedrich William III, whom she asked to be allowed to bear the Coat of arms of Prussia on her products, which she underlined, among other things, with her merits in action after the Battle of Waterloo. This privilege was granted to it on 28 November 1829, making it one of the few Cologne-based companies in the production of Cologne to be allowed to bear the royal coat of arms. The company Johann Maria Farina gegenüber dem Jülichs-Platz, for example, had struggled in vain to gain the same competitive advantage.

In the following years, Farina had several disputes and complaints about competitors who used the Prussian eagle for their products without permission, whereby the responsible authorities initially did not intervene in their favour due to a lack of legal basis. Conversely, the companies concerned complained about Martin, as the latter was not only using the Prussian eagle as part of the Prussian coat of arms, but the entire Mittleres Wappen Preußens to distinguish business and goods, which was not covered by its royal authorisation. This coat of arms contained, in addition to the eagle proper, a crown on the escutcheon as well as the Prussian provincial and territorial arms. It was flanked by two "wild men" as shield bearers. However, Martin succeeded in obtaining approval for the use of the full coat of arms by replying to the Cologne government authority as well as to the Westphalian chief president Karl von Vincke in July 1830, which enabled her to maintain her competitive edge.

=== Differentiation from competitors ===
Although her main product Melissengeist did not have a significant unique selling point in its composition, Martin was very successful in establishing and defending a good market position for her company, despite some setbacks. On 17 October 1831, she deposited her "factory mark" with the Council of Trade Experts of the City of Cologne. In 1832, she applied to the Prussian government for the exclusive right to produce and sell the product Melissengeist and for recognition as a medicine. Until then, only sale as a perfume had been permitted. Despite the Cologne authorities' benevolent treatment of the application, which already restricted competitors in advance of a pending ministerial decision, the Berlin government rejected the application after a long processing time on 15 March 1834. Once again, the inadmissibility of restricting pharmacists was pointed out, who could prepare the product on prescription at any time and who, apart from that, were solely authorised to produce medicines. Thus, lemon balm spirit could officially continue to be marketed only as a cosmetic and competition in this product segment could not be regulated in Martin's favour. However, since Melissengeist products were, more or less subtly, definitely marketed with references to medicinal applications, there were nevertheless interventions against competitors, but not against Martin, who enjoyed a certain degree of protection, not least due to the royal permission to use the coat of arms. In 1835, Martin herself successfully denounced a competitor who wanted to distribute the Carmelite spirit imported from Regensburg in Cologne with an instruction leaflet aimed at medicinal use, although she herself used very similar papers.

In order to become internationally known, she took part in the Kunst- und Industrie-Ausstellung (Art and Industry Exhibition) organised by the Gewerbe-Verein in Cologne from 27 May 1838 to 4 July 1838 on the Heumarkt. As late as 30 August 1842, advertisements appeared in the Kölnische Zeitung about her melissa spirit. Shortly before her death, she wrote her will on 5 April 1843, in which she made "Peter Schaeben, who lives with me" the "heir to my entire estate, trusting that he will faithfully maintain the pious attitude he has shown since then throughout his life". Maria Clementine Martin died on August 9, 1843, and was buried in the Melaten cemetery with great sympathy. Her grave is a listed building. Her water received a first award after her death in August 1843 at the London World's Fair, which took place between May and October 1851. She bequeathed the business to her assistant Peter Gustav Schaeben (1815–1885), who expanded it considerably and distributed the products worldwide.

Martin died in Cologne aged 68.
