= Carmelite Water =

Alcoholic extract

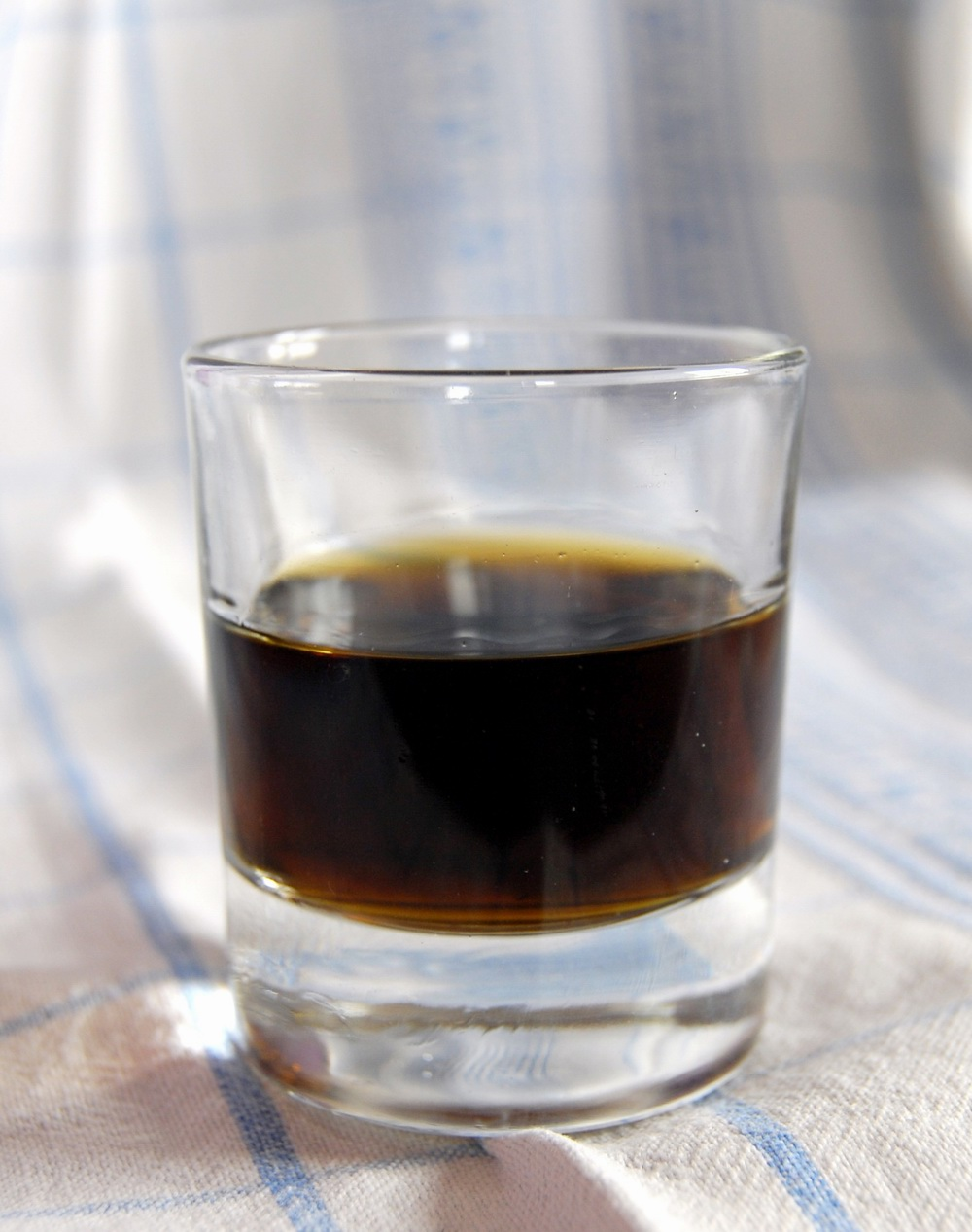
Alcoholic extract of lemon balm.

Carmelite water is an alcoholic extract of lemon balm and other herbs. It was initially crafted in the 14th century by Carmelite nuns from the Abbey of St Just, and was commercialized under the name Eau de Carmes. It is used as an herbal tonic and eau de toilette.

Various properties are traditionally attributed to lemon balm. It was believed to have healing powers for all sorts of ailments, such as melancholy (Hildegard of Bingen: "lemon balm is warm ... and the man who eats it is cheerful, because its heat is communicated to the spleen, which rejoices the heart"), epilepsy, apoplexy (Paracelsus: "the best herb for the heart", Ibn Sina or Avicenna: "lemon balm is a cardiac tonic") and Pliny the Elder recommended the plant in the form of an aqueous extract or oenolé against insect bites, menstrual disorders, abdominal pain and rheumatic diseases. In the 17th century, the English writer John Evelyn described lemon balm as a plant good for the brain.

== See also ==
- Klosterfrau Melissengeist
