= Condomi =

German condom manufacturer

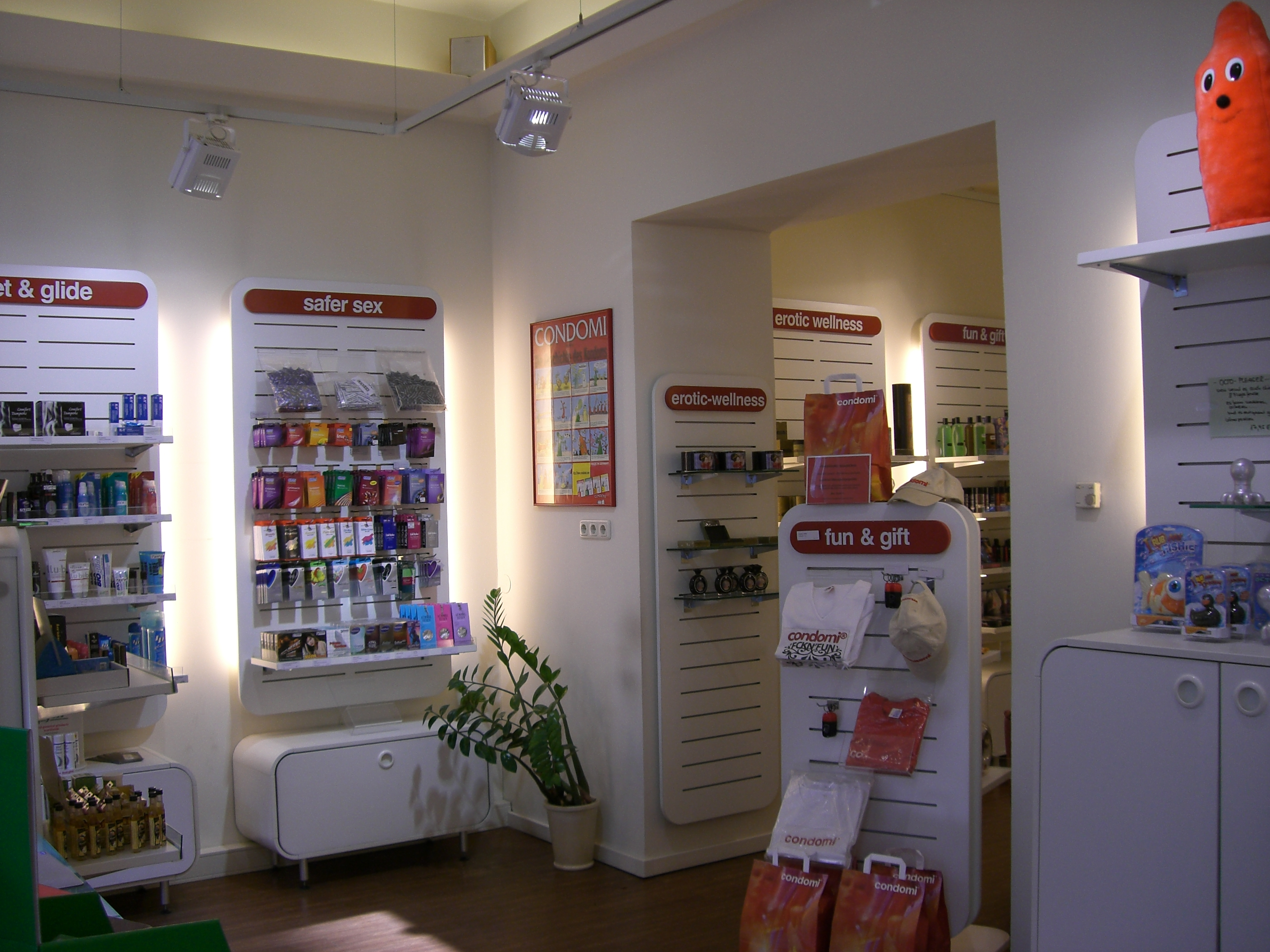
Condomi shop in Cologne

Condomi is a German condom manufacturer based in Cologne, which began production in 1988. For many years, Condomi used a production technique that did not involve the use of the milk protein casein. This meant Condomi was one of the few condom lines that were casein-free and suitable for Vegetarians and Vegans.

Condomi is currently owned by Unimill Condoms, which is a subsidiary of Ansell.

Condomi's products come in a variety of styles and flavours including strawberry, chocolate, spearmint, and coconut.
