= Florida Water =

Type of perfume

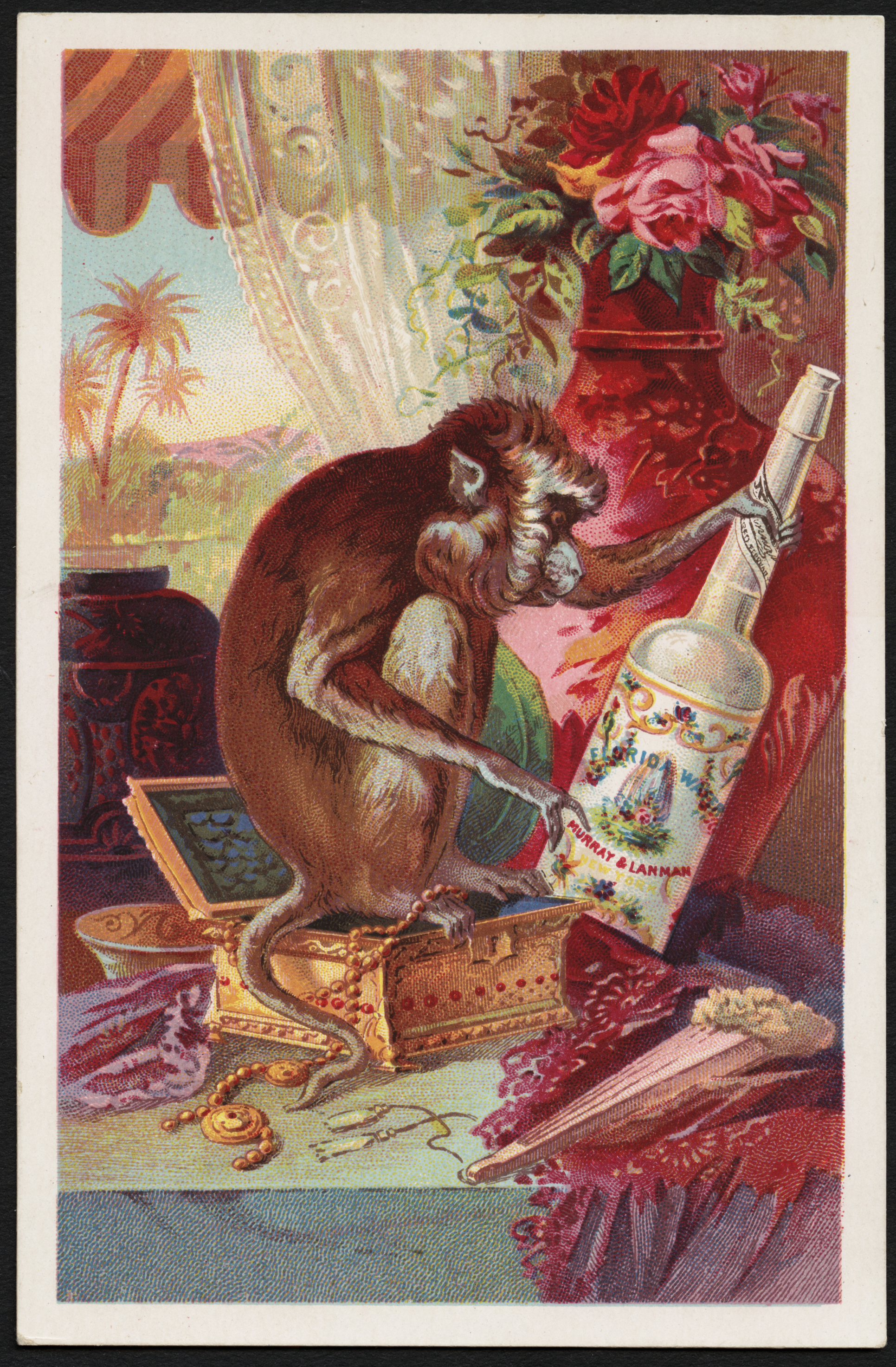
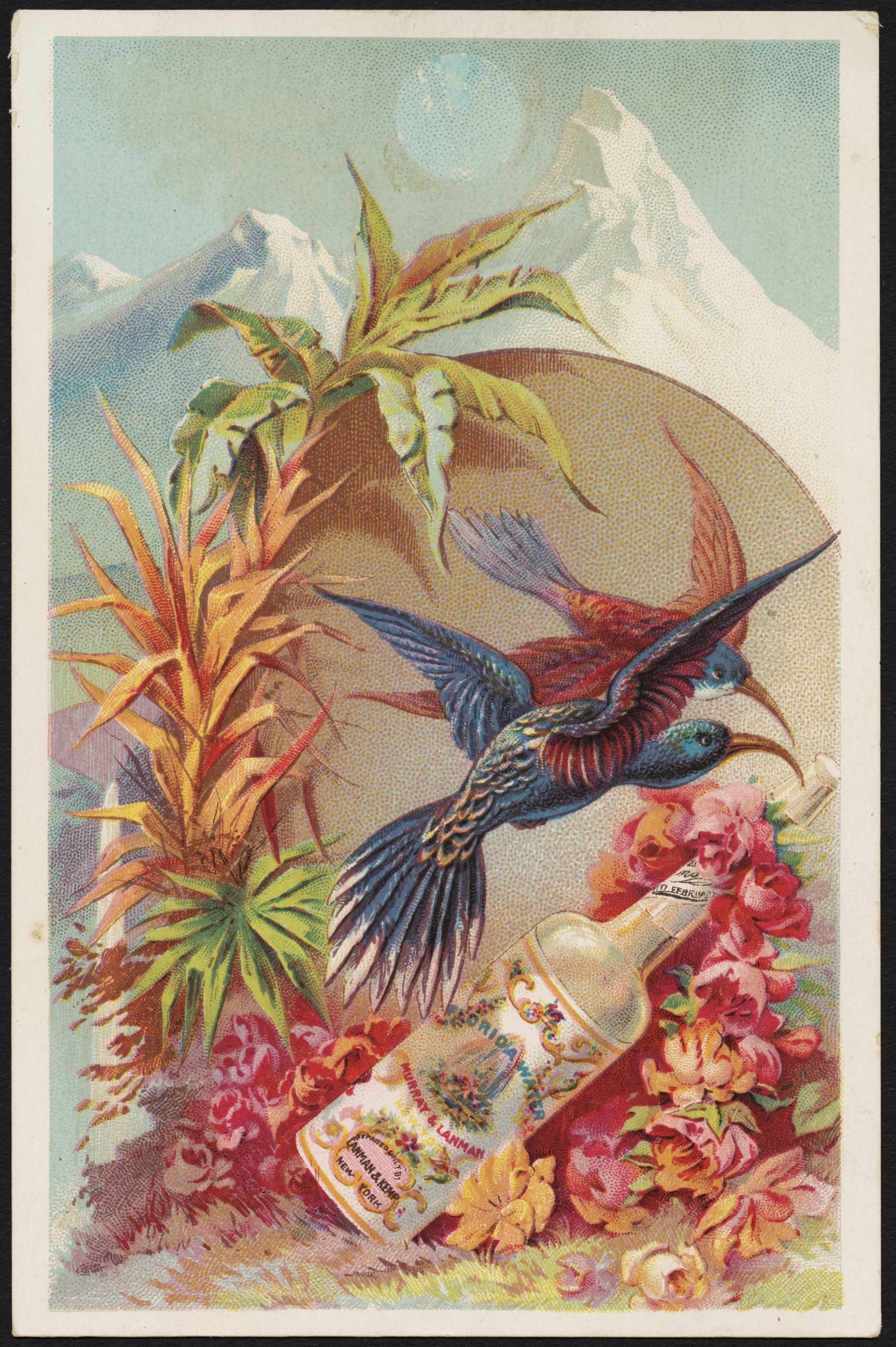
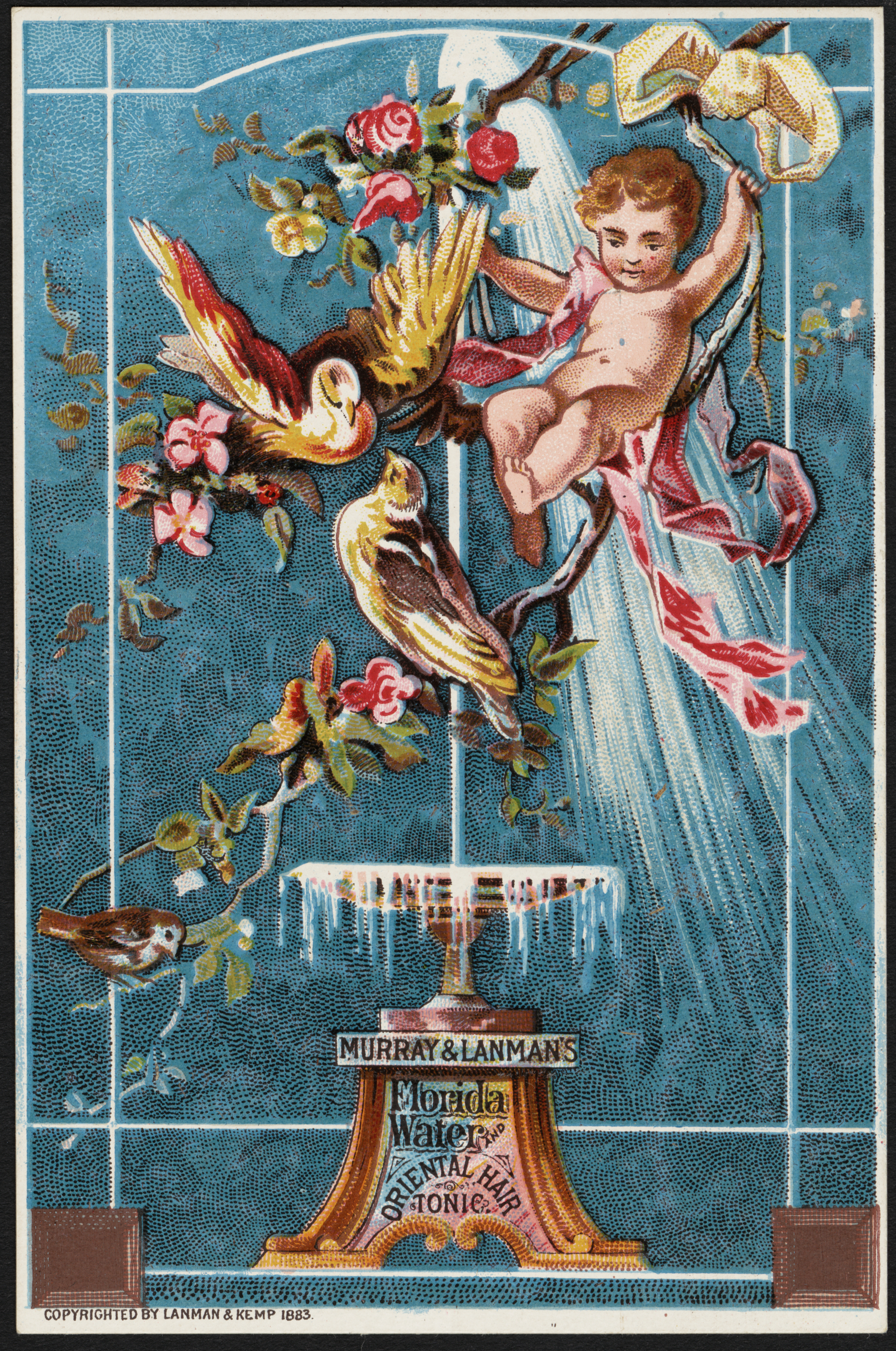
Trade cards advertising Florida Water

Florida Water is an American version of an eau de Cologne. Like European eaux de Cologne, it is a citric scent, but shifts the emphasis towards sweet orange (rather than the bergamot orange, lemon, and neroli of 4711) and adds spicy notes like clove. The name refers to the fabled Fountain of Youth, which is said to be located in Florida, as well as the "floral" nature of the scent.

Its most significant non-cosmetic usage is found in different spiritual and/or religious belief systems and practices of Amerindian peoples and the descendants of formerly enslaved people of a Yoruba (or more generally Central West African) background in nearly all regions of the Americas.

== History ==
=== In the Americas ===
Florida Water was introduced by the New York City perfumer Robert I. Murray, in 1808 who founded a company to sell the scent. In 1835, Murray was joined by David Trumbull Lanman, and the firm became Murray & Lanman. The firm went through several name changes, initially David T. Lanman and Co., and in 1861, became Lanman & Kemp. The modern producer of Florida Water, Lanman & Kemp-Barclay & Co, states that their product, now sold under the Murray & Lanman brand, still uses the original 1808 formula, and that the current label is also a slightly modified version of the 1808 original.

Florida Water was regarded as a unisex scent, suitable for men and women alike. Late 19th century etiquette manuals warn young women against the "offensive" impression made by a strong perfume, but Florida Water and Eau de Cologne were recommended as appropriate for all, along with sachets for scenting the linen and fresh flowers in the corsage. Large quantities were also used by barbershops as cologne and aftershave. In the 1880s and 1890s, Murray & Lanman Florida Water was advertised as "The Richest of all Perfumes" and "The most Popular Perfume in the World".

=== In East Asia ===
Florida Water (花露水) has also been manufactured in Hong Kong since the turn of the 20th century, the most famous of which is the hundred-year-old Kwong Sang Hong "Two Girls" Brand of Florida Water. Once a common household item throughout Hong Kong, particularly as a refreshing topical application on skins during summer months, "Two Girls" Florida Water remains moderately popular as a “retro” toiletry product in Hong Kong and Southeast Asia, complete with elaborate, nostalgic packaging designs.

==== China ====
After the Chinese Communist Party won the Chinese Civil War in 1949, private cosmetic companies were all nationalized. Brand names such as "Liu Shen" (六神), "Maxam" (美加净) and "Butterfly" (蝴蝶) were then created and made popular.

The formulations in these products are quite different from Murray & Lanman and Two Girls, having morphed into a summertime skincare product containing menthol (or borneol) and traditional Chinese medicinal herbs. Such products are most commonly used for relieving itchiness caused by insect bites and miliaria. Further developments include formulations with added insect repellents.

== Usages in religious or spiritual practices ==
=== United States and the Caribbean ===
Florida Water is used in the syncretic spiritual system, (Note: Sometimes called a folk religion many practitioners of Hoodoo identify primarily as Christian and thus would consider the categorization of a subset of their spiritual practices as its own religion as offensive. O'Reilly, Jonathan (2019). Conjure and Christianity in the Nineteenth-Century African American Imagination (PDF) (PhD thesis). Liverpool John Moores University. pp. 6–7. Archived from the original (PDF) on 2024-06-03. McPherson, Jadele (2007). "Rethinking African Religions: African Americans, Afro-Latinos, Latinos, and Afro-Cuban Religions in Chicago". Afro-Hispanic Review. 26 (1): 124. ISSN 0278-8969. JSTOR 23055252.) named Hoodoo, practiced by some African Americans and Haitian people descending primarily from formerly enslaved West African populations. An influence on these Florida Water-related practices may be practices related to the concept of Orisha in the Yoruba religion, either transmitted directly from ancestral African practices or transmitted via Afro-Caribbean religious practices such as Regla de Ocha, Espiritismo, or Palo. In all these practices of the Western Hemisphere, Florida Water is often used as a means to spiritually cleanse and its pleasant scent is believed to appease the dead.

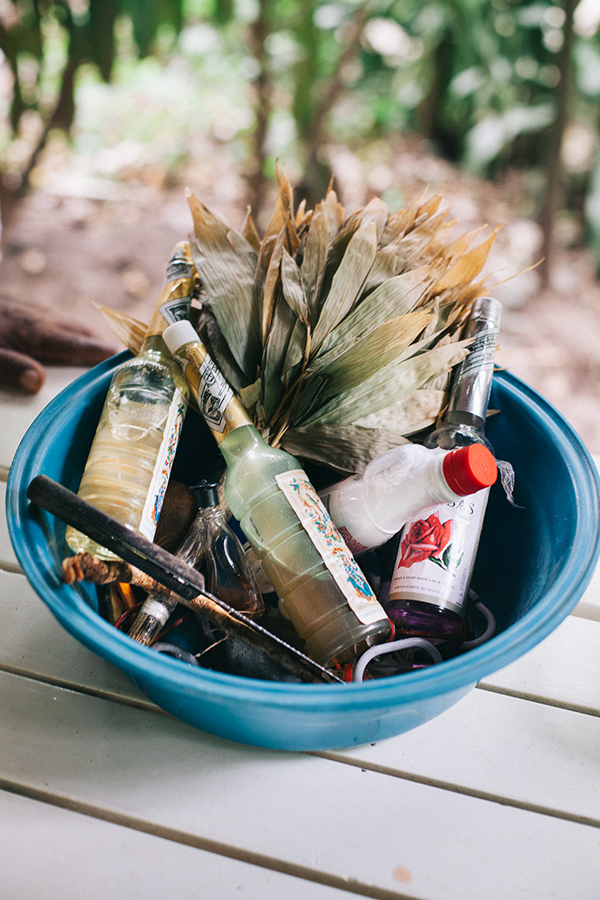
Bottles of Florida Water, a chakapa and other items commonly used by a curandero in Peru

=== Peru ===
In the traditional spiritual practices of the natives of the Huancabamba and Ayabaca province in Peru, eaux de Cologne and perfumes are an integral part of all offerings. The practitioners differentiate between industrial products such as Florida Water and natural products made locally by crushing various seeds from plants native to the Andean mountains and putting them into alcohol. Given the great cost of the former and the affordability of the latter, Florida Water is near ubiquitous to most offerings practiced in this religion. Given the right economic circumstances of the practitioners it would not be commonly preferred by them. Moreover, some even feel it might be an insult to especially powerful entities. It is carried by all, even the poor and elderly, at all times not merely when proactively making offerings to spirit manifestations of huacas and the psychoactive San Pedro Cactus, but also as a means of "insurance", a means to appease and thus protect, should one encounter them when one is not prepared. Such an offering is usually accompanied by a ritual phrase. (Note: For example: "Vamos a pagar a este sanpedro para que no nos deje dañar, para decir a toda mi gente. Así mesmo para esta hora te voy a cortar, sanpedrito, para que me digas y me desates entre mis sueños y entre mis trabajos te voy a pagar esta Agua Florida [escupe tres veces Agua Florida] Por esta hora y por este momento te voy a cortar para que me digas toda tu verdad y me quede grabada en el pecho por este momento." [English:"We are going to offer payment to this San Pedro cactus so that it does not allow harm to come to us, and to communicate to all my people. In the same way, at this time, I am going to cut you, little San Pedro, so that you may speak to me and untangle my dreams and my labors. I will offer you this Florida Water [spits three times with Florida Water]. For this time and for this moment, I am going to cut you so that you may reveal your entire truth to me, and it remains engraved in my heart for this moment."]) It commonly is an ingredient in different psychoactive Brugmansia preparations belonging to this spiritual practice.

It belongs to the standard objects utilized by curanderos, i.e. healers, of this religious tradition due to its name, Spanish: Agua Florida, lit. 'Water of "Florida"' with Florida not being read as a proper noun, but as a term thoroughly embedded into the healer's vocabulary as either the function of Spanish: Florecimientio, lit. 'having health and good luck' or the action Spanish: florecer, lit. 'to recuperate health and good luck'.

=== Chile and Bolivia ===
In the Ayahuasca ceremonies mainly offered to tourists in the Amazon region, it is common for the curandero to spit Florida Water onto the participant at set points, particularly those where the participant is expected to vomit or to soil themselves in a bout of diarrhea due to Florida Water's assumed spiritually purifying effects.

=== Central America ===
In the folk remedies of Honduras, seizures are traditionally referred to as Spanish: el mal, lit. 'the evil' or Spanish: ataque, lit. 'attack' and believed to be caused by demonic possession. One of their non-medical traditional "treatments" involves making the seizure victim smell garlic or onion and rubbing their body with Florida Water. These "treatments" have detrimental effects, especially if the seizures are caused by epilepsy. Curanderos belonging to the Mayan people and practicing its rites in San Andrés, Guatemala commonly use Florida Water in their practices and healing concoctions among natural ingredients and other industrial ones like Vicks VapoRub.
