= Gerardus Mercator =

Flemish cartographer (1512–1594)

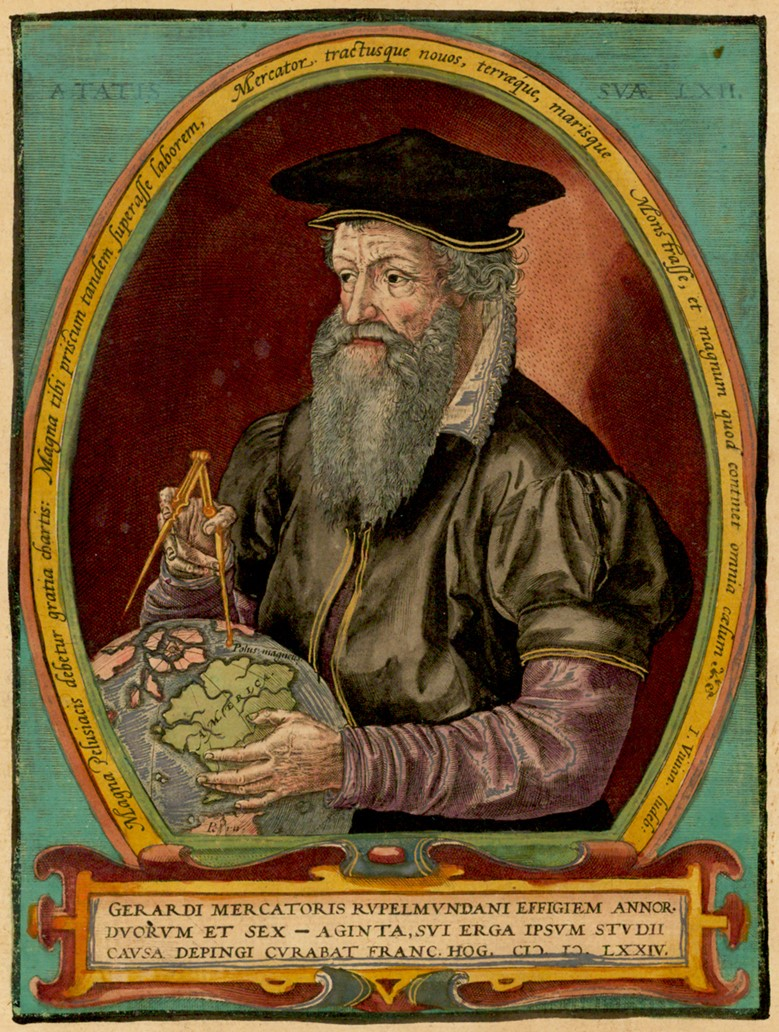
- 1574 portrait by Hogenberg; translation
- Born: Geert De Kremer; 5 March 1512; Rupelmonde, County of Flanders
- Died: 2 December 1594 (aged 82); Duisburg, United Duchies of Jülich-Cleves-Berg, Holy Roman Empire
- Education: University of Leuven
- Known for: World map based on the Mercator projection (1569); Coining the term Atlas
- Spouses: Barbara Schellekens (m. 1534; died 1586) Gertrude Vierlings (m. 1589)
- Children: 6, including Arnold and Rumold

Gerardus Mercator (/dʒəˈrɑːrdəs mɜːrˈkeɪtər, mər-/; (Note: "Mercator" at Webster's Dictionary) (Note: Local Neo-Latin pronunciation: /ɣɛˈrardʊs/ or /gɛˈrardʊs ˈmɛrkatɔr/.) (Note: In English speaking countries Gerardus is usually anglicized as Gerard with a soft initial letter (as in 'giant') but in other European countries the spelling and pronunciation vary: for example Gérard (soft 'g') in France but Gerhard (hard 'g') in Germany. In English the second syllable of Mercator is stressed and sounds as Kate: in other countries that syllable is sounded as 'cat' and the stress moves to the third syllable.) 5 March 1512 – 2 December 1594) (Note: Mercator's birth and death dates are given in Vita Mercatoris (The life of Mercator) by his friend and first biographer Walter Ghim. This was published in the preface to the Atlas of 1595. A translation is given in Sullivan (2000), pages 7–24 of the atlas text, pdf pages 77–94) was a Flemish geographer, cosmographer and cartographer. He is most renowned for creating the 1569 world map based on a new projection which represented sailing courses of constant bearing (rhumb lines) as straight lines—an innovation that is still employed in nautical charts.

Mercator was a notable maker of globes and scientific instruments. In addition, he had interests in theology, philosophy, history, mathematics, and geomagnetism. He was also an accomplished engraver and calligrapher. Unlike other great scholars of the age, he travelled little and his knowledge of geography came from his library of over a thousand books and maps, from his visitors and from his vast correspondence (in six languages) with other scholars, statesmen, travellers, merchants and seamen. Mercator's early maps were in large formats suitable for wall mounting but in the second half of his life, he produced over 100 new regional maps in a smaller format suitable for binding into his Atlas of 1595. This was the first appearance of the word "atlas" in connection with maps, but Mercator did not intend the word to mean a collection of maps; it was a neologism for a treatise (Cosmologia) on the creation, history and description of the universe. He chose the word as a reference to a legendary king of Mauretania who was traditionally considered the first great geographer.

A large part of Mercator's income came from sales of terrestrial and celestial globes. For sixty years they were considered the finest in the world, and were sold in such numbers that there are many surviving examples. This was a substantial enterprise involving the manufacture of the spheres, printing the gores, building substantial stands, packing and distributing them all over Europe. He was also renowned for his scientific instruments, particularly his astrolabes and astronomical rings used to study the geometry of astronomy and astrology.

Mercator wrote on geography, philosophy, chronology and theology. All of the wall maps were engraved with copious text on the region concerned. As an example, the famous world map of 1569 is inscribed with over five thousand words in fifteen legends. The 1595 Atlas has about 120 pages of maps and illustrated title pages, but a greater number of pages are devoted to his account of the creation of the universe and descriptions of all the countries portrayed. His table of chronology ran to some 400 pages fixing the dates (from the time of creation) of earthly dynasties, major political and military events, volcanic eruptions, earthquakes and eclipses. He also wrote on the gospels and the Old Testament.

Mercator was a devout Christian born into a Catholic family at a time when Martin Luther's Protestantism was gaining ground. He never declared himself as a Lutheran but was clearly sympathetic, and he was accused of heresy by Catholic authorities; after six months in prison he was released unscathed. This period of persecution is probably the major factor in his move from Catholic Leuven (Louvain) to a more tolerant Duisburg, in the Holy Roman Empire, where he lived for the last thirty years of his life. Walter Ghim, Mercator's friend and first biographer, describes him as sober in his behaviour, yet cheerful and witty in company, and never more happy than in debate with other scholars. (Note: The full text of Ghim's biography is translated in Sullivan (2000) pages 7–24 of the atlas text, pdf pages 77–94.)

== Life ==
=== Early years ===
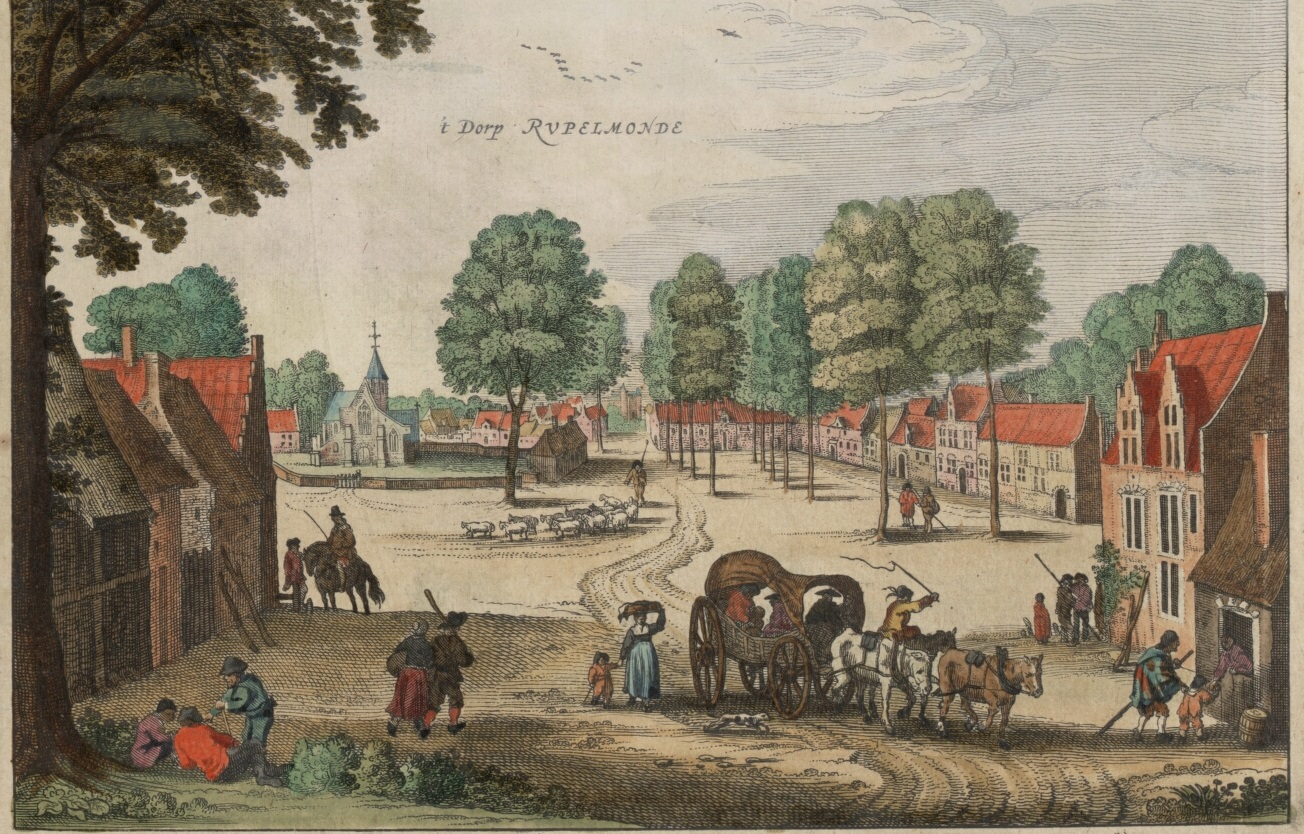
Rupelmonde, now in Belgium, from Flandria illustrata, 1641

Gerardus Mercator was born Geert or Gerard (De) Kremer (or Cremer) in Rupelmonde, Flanders, a small village to the southwest of Antwerp, which was in the fiefdom of Habsburg Netherlands. The seventh child of Hubert (De) Kremer and his wife Emerance, his parents came from Gangelt in the Duchy of Jülich (present-day Germany). At the time of the birth they were visiting Hubert's brother (or uncle (Note: There is some doubt whether Gisbert was Hubert's brother or his uncle.)) Gisbert De Kremer. (Note: People in both locations at the time spoke dialects of Early Modern Dutch; there was probably almost no language barrier.) Hubert was a poor artisan, a shoemaker by trade, but Gisbert, a priest, was a man of some importance in the community. Their stay in Rupelmonde was brief and within six months they returned to Gangelt, and there Mercator spent his earliest childhood until the age of six. (Note: The evidence for Mercator's place of birth is in his letter to Wollfgang Haller (Averdunk & Müller-Reinhard (1914, Letter 26), and Van Durme (1959, Letter 152)) and in the biography by his personal friend Ghim (1595).) In 1518, the Kremer family moved back to Rupelmonde, (Note: From 1518 the Kremers are mentioned in the archived records of Rupelmonde.) possibly motivated by the deteriorating conditions in Gangelt—famine, plague and lawlessness. Mercator would have attended the local school in Rupelmonde from the age of seven, when he arrived from Gangelt, and there he would have been taught the basics of reading, writing, arithmetic and Latin.

=== School at 's-Hertogenbosch, 1526–1530 ===
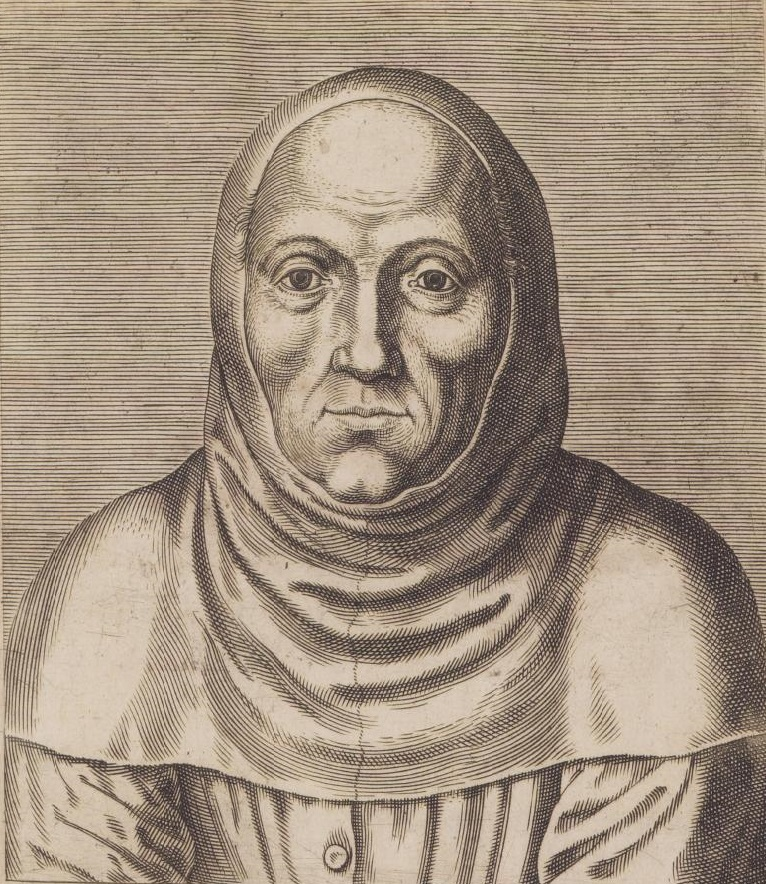
The playwright and teacher Georgius Macropedius

After Hubert's death in 1526, Gisbert became the 15-year-old Geert's guardian. Hoping that Geert might follow him into the priesthood, he sent him to the famous school of the Brethren of the Common Life at 's-Hertogenbosch (Note: 's-Hertogenbosch (Duke's Forest) is Bois-le-Duc in French and Herzogenbusch in German, colloquially Le Bois or Den Bosch. In the sixteenth century it was the second largest town in the Low Countries.) in the Duchy of Brabant. The Brotherhood and the school were founded by the charismatic Geert Groote, who placed great emphasis on study of the Bible and, at the same time, expressed disapproval of the dogmas of the church; both of these points of view were facets of the "heresies" of Martin Luther propounded a few years earlier in 1517. Mercator followed similar precepts later in life, with problematic outcomes.

During his time at the school the headmaster was Georgius Macropedius, and under his guidance Geert studied the Bible, the trivium (Latin, logic and rhetoric) and classics such as the philosophy of Aristotle, the natural history of Pliny and the geography of Ptolemy. All teaching at the school was in Latin; he read, wrote and conversed in Latin, and gave himself a Latin name, Gerardus Mercator Rupelmundanus, Mercator being the Latin translation of Kremer, which means "merchant". The Brethren were renowned for their scriptorium, (Note: A scriptorium was where manuscripts were copied by hand. In 1512, such endeavours had not been completely overtaken by printing.) and here Mercator might have encountered the italic script which he employed in his later work. The brethren were also renowned for their thoroughness and discipline, well attested by Erasmus, who had attended the school forty years before Mercator. (Note: The letters of Erasmus quoted in Crane 2003, p. 33)

=== University of Leuven, 1530–1532 ===
From the famous school at 's-Hertogenbosch, Mercator moved to the famous University of Leuven, where his full Latin name appears in the matriculation records for 1530. He lived in one of the teaching colleges, the Castle College, and, although he was classified as a pauper, he rubbed shoulders with richer students, amongst whom were the anatomist Andreas Vesalius, the statesman Antoine Perrenot, and the theologian George Cassander, all destined to fame and all lifelong friends of Mercator.

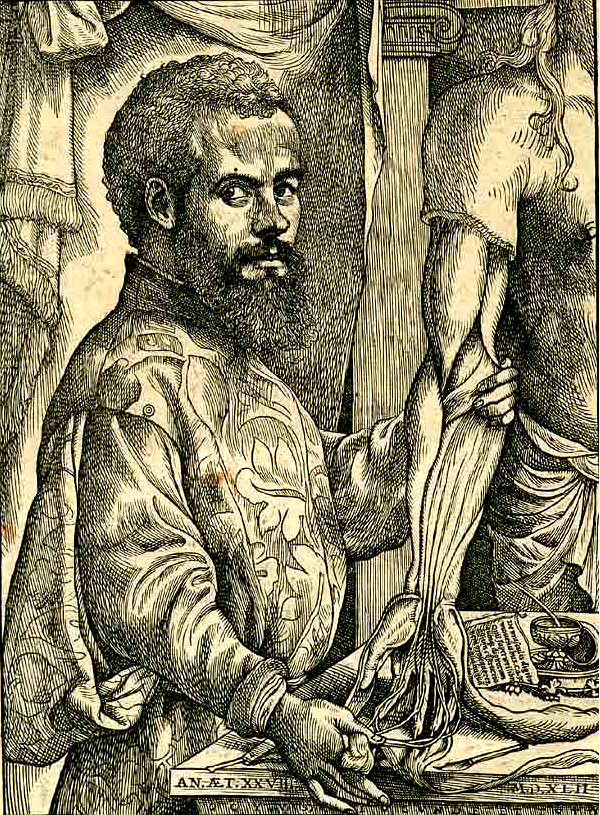
Andreas Vesalius

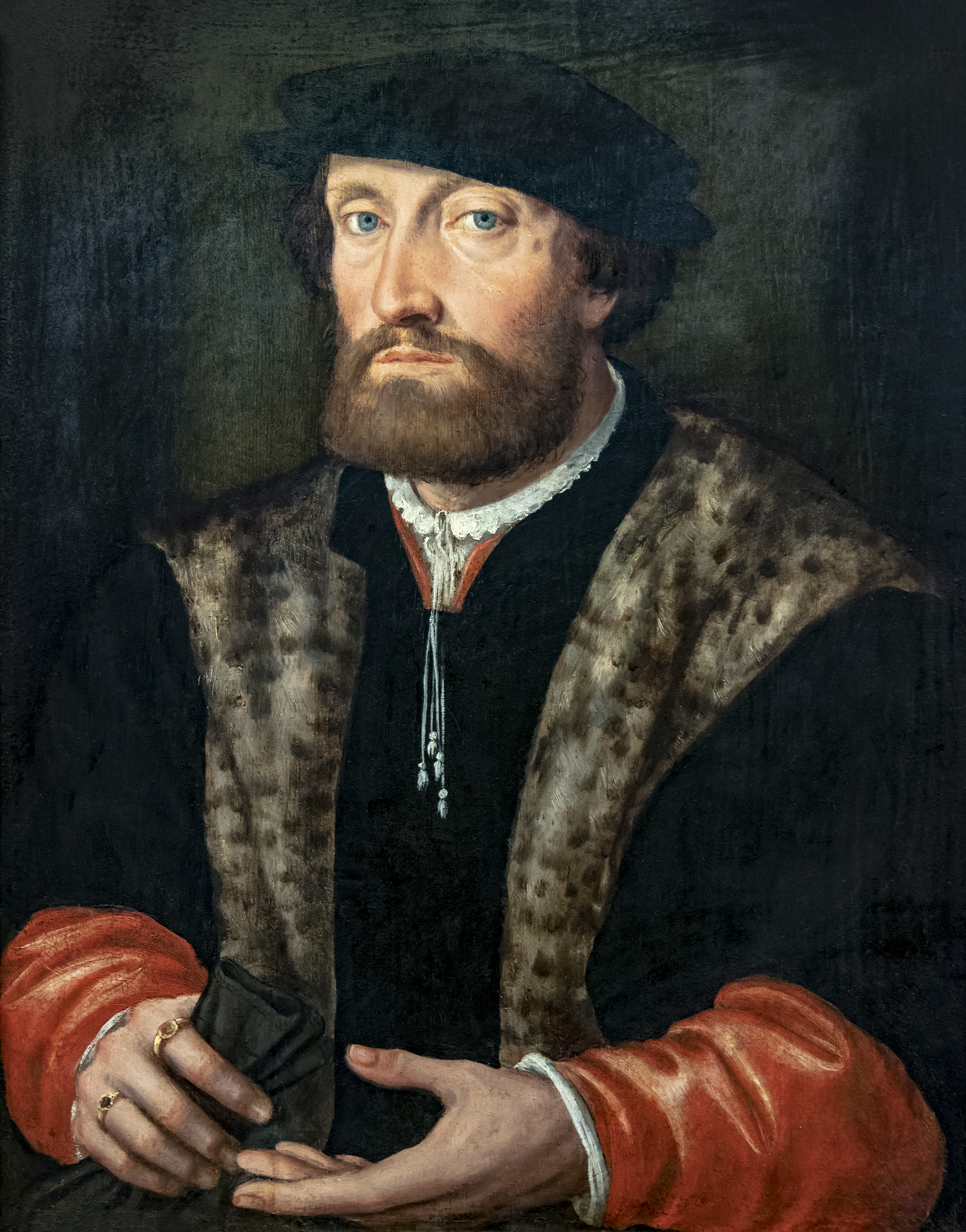
Antoine Perrenot

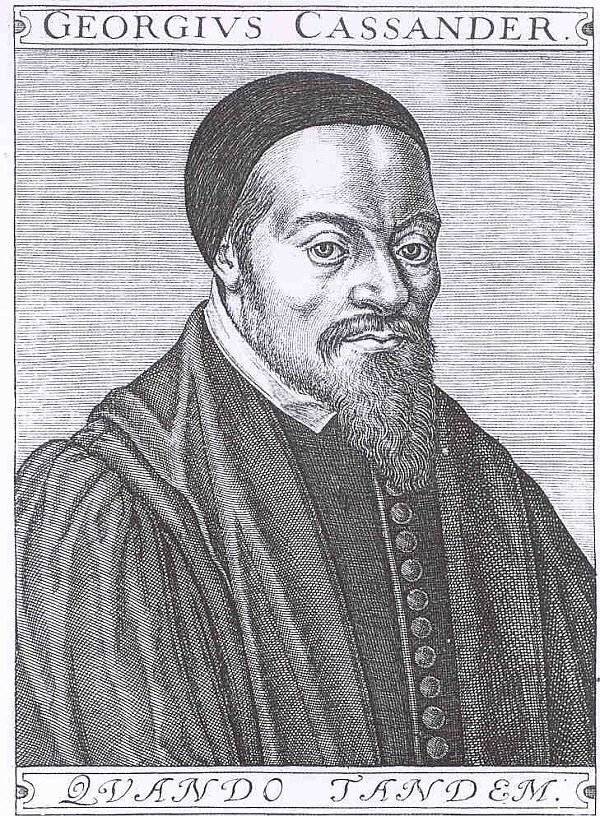
George Cassander

The general first degree (for Magister) centred on the teaching of philosophy, theology and Greek under the conservative Scholasticism which gave prime place to the authority of Aristotle. (Note: The university statutes stated explicitly that to disbelieve the teaching of Aristotle was heretical and would be punished by expulsion. See Crane 2003, pp. 46–47, Chapter 4) Although the trivium was now augmented by the quadrivium (Note: The trivium and the quadrivium together constitute the seven liberal arts) (arithmetic, geometry, astronomy, music), coverage of the quadrivium was neglected in favour of theology and philosophy; Mercator undertook further study of the first three subjects of the quadrivium in later years. He graduated as Magister in 1532. (Note: Mercator at the Mathematics Genealogy Project)

=== Antwerp, 1532–1534 ===
The normal progress for an able magister was to go on to further study in one of the four faculties at Leuven: theology, medicine, canon law and Roman law. Gisbert might have hoped that Mercator would go further in theology and train for the priesthood, but Mercator did not: like many twenty-year-old young men, he was having his first serious doubts. The problem was the contradiction between the authority of Aristotle and his own biblical study and scientific observations, particularly in relation to the creation and description of the world. Such doubt was treated as heresy at the university, and it is quite possible that he had already said enough in classroom disputations to come to the notice of the authorities; fortunately, he did not put his sentiments into print. He left Leuven for Antwerp, (Note: There is uncertainty as to whether he was away in Antwerp for a single long period or whether he simply made a number of visits. See Osley 1969, p. 20, footnote 2) there to devote his time to contemplation of philosophy. The events of this period of his life are uncertain. (Note: Ghim 1595 simply states that Mercator read philosophy privately for two years.) He certainly read widely but succeeded only in uncovering more contradictions between the world of the Bible and the world of geography, a discrepancy which occupied him for the rest of his life. He certainly could not effect a reconciliation between his studies and the world of Aristotle.

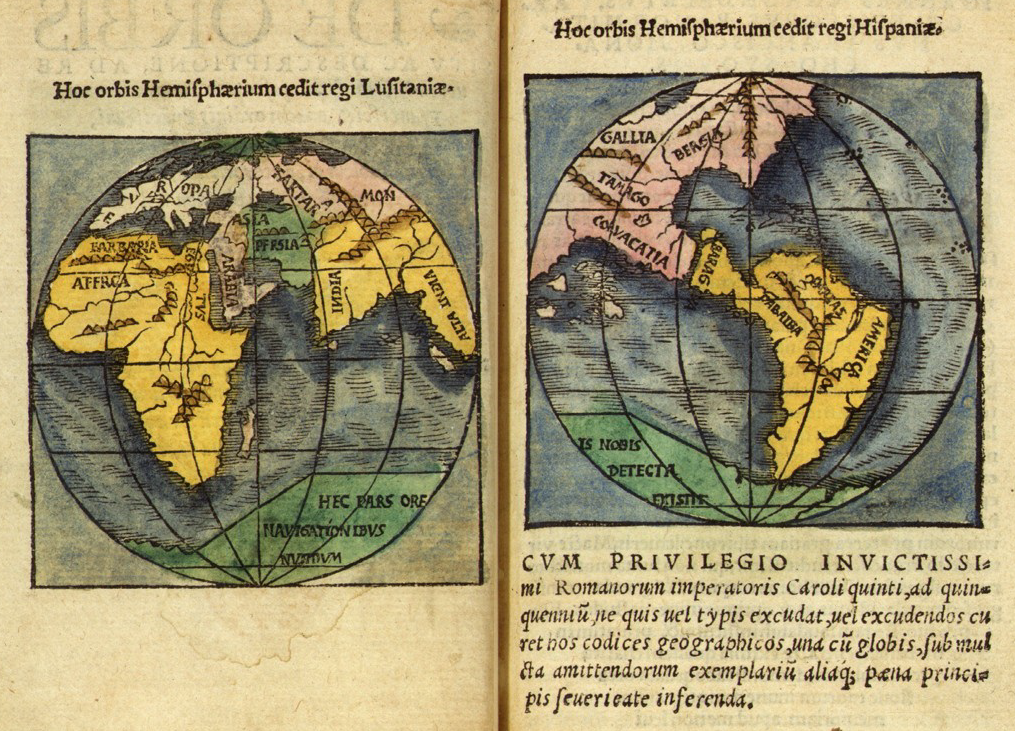
The Portuguese (Lusitanian) and Spanish hemispheres of the globe of Franciscus Monachus, following the Treaty of Tordesillas of 1494.

During this period Mercator was in contact with the Franciscan friar Franciscus Monachus who lived in the monastery of Mechelen. He was a controversial figure who, from time to time, was in conflict with the church authorities because of his humanist outlook and his break from Aristotelian views of the world: his own views of geography were based on investigation and observation. Mercator must have been impressed by Monachus, including his map collection and the famous globe that he had prepared for Jean Carondelet, the principal advisor of Charles V. (Note: See Horst 2011, p. 49, Crane 2003, p. 58) The globe was constructed by the Leuven goldsmith Gaspar van der Heyden (Gaspar a Myrica c. 1496–c. 1549) to whom Mercator became an apprentice. These encounters may well have provided the stimulus to set aside his struggle with theology and commit himself to geography. Later he said, "Since my youth, geography has been for me the primary subject of study. I liked not only the description of the Earth but the structure of the whole machinery of the world." (Note: From the dedication to the volume of Ptolemy Mercator published in 1578. See Crane 2003, p. 54)

=== Leuven, 1534–1543 ===
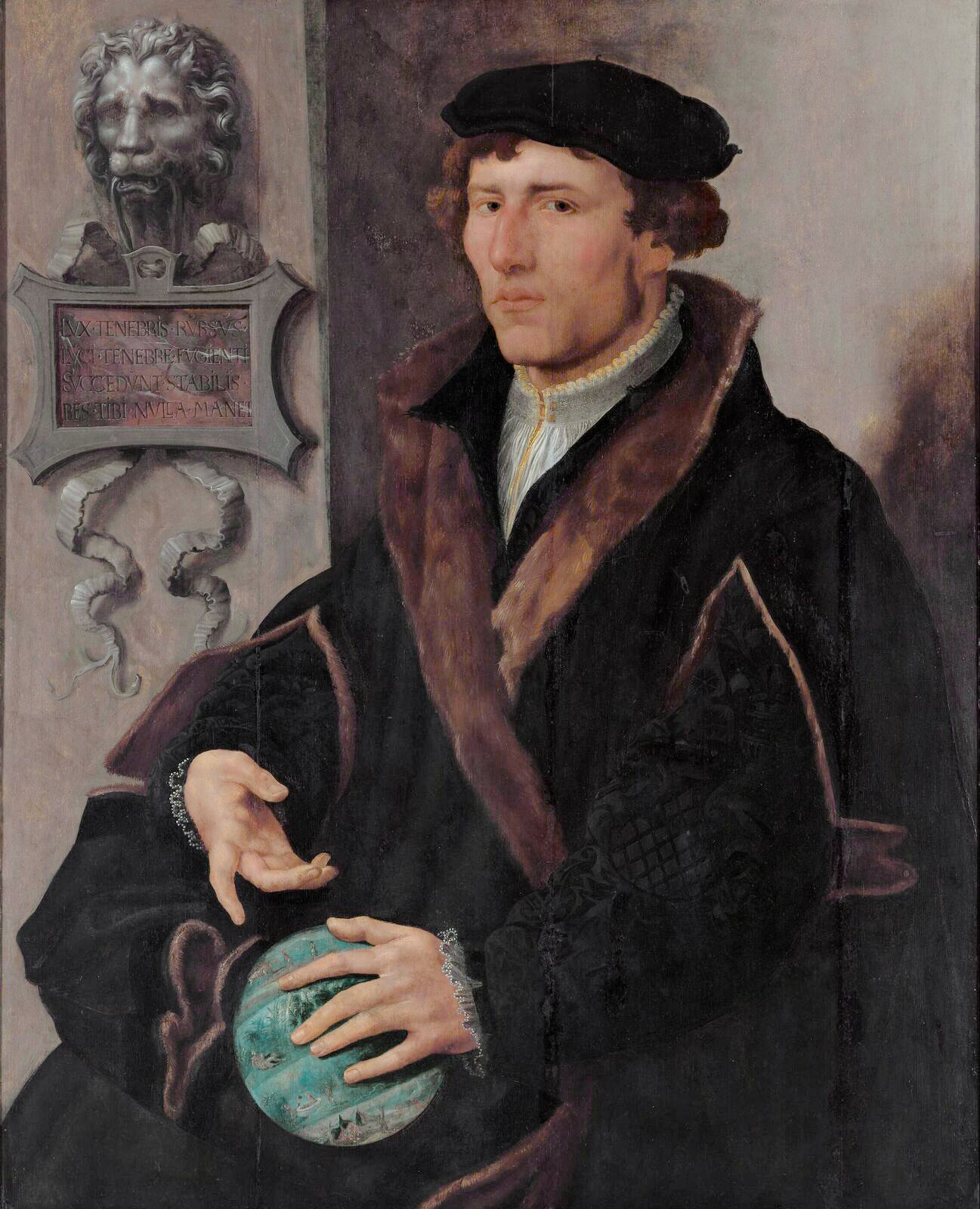
Gemma Frisius by Maarten van Heemskerck

Towards the end of 1534, the twenty-two-year-old Mercator arrived back in Leuven and threw himself into the study of geography, mathematics and astronomy under the guidance of Gemma Frisius. At first Mercator was completely out of his depth but, with the help and friendship of Gemma (who was four years his elder) he succeeded in mastering the elements of mathematics within two years and the university granted him permission to tutor private students. Gemma had designed some of the mathematical instruments used in these studies and Mercator soon became adept in the skills of their manufacture: practical skills of working in brass, mathematical skills for calculation of scales, and engraving skills to produce the markings required.

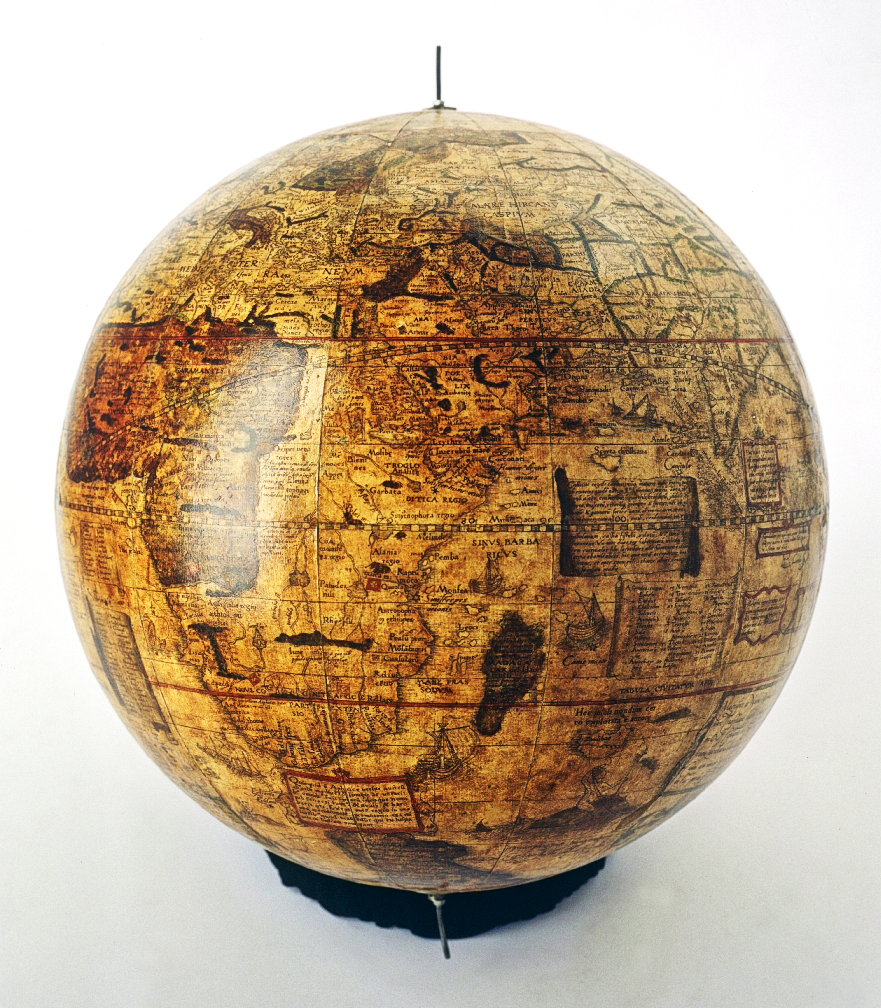
The terrestrial globe of Gemma Frisius showing, in the south Pacific, the cartouche containing the dedication to Charles V and the publishing rights of Mercator. (Note: The text on the cartouche states "Edebat Gerardus Mercator Rupelmundanus cum privilegio Ces(areae) Maiestatis ad an: sex Lovanij an: 1541", meaning "Published by Gerard Mercator of Rupelmunde at Leuven under the patent of His Imperial Majesty for six years in the year 1541.” Mercator accordingly had the rights to the globe he had produced in Leuven (Flanders) secured by an imperial patent for six years.)

Gemma and Gaspar Van der Heyden had completed a terrestrial globe in 1529, but by 1535 they were planning a new globe embodying the latest geographical discoveries. The gores were to be engraved on copper instead of wood, and the text was to be in an elegant italic script instead of the heavy Roman lettering of the early globes. The globe was a combined effort: Gemma researched the content, Van der Heyden engraved the geographical features and Mercator engraved the text, including the cartouche which exhibited his own name in public for the first time. The text in the cartouche attributes the production copyright to Mercator. The globe was finished in 1536 and its celestial counterpart appeared one year later. These widely admired globes were costly and their wide sales provided Mercator an income which, together with that from mathematical instruments and from teaching, allowed him to marry and establish a home. He married Barbara Schellekens in September 1536, and Arnold, the first of their six children, was born a year later.

The arrival of Mercator on the cartographic scene would have been noted by the cognoscenti who purchased Gemma's globe – the professors, rich merchants, prelates, aristocrats and courtiers of the emperor Charles V at nearby Brussels. The commissions and patronage of such wealthy individuals provided an important source of income throughout his life. His connection with this world of privilege was facilitated by his fellow student Antoine Perrenot, soon to be appointed Bishop of Arras, and Antoine's father, Nicholas Perrenot, the chancellor of Charles V.

Working alongside Gemma whilst they were producing the globes, Mercator would have witnessed the process of progress in geographical knowledge: obtaining previous maps, comparing and collating their content, studying geographical texts and seeking new information from correspondents, merchants, pilgrims, travellers and seamen. He put his newly learned talents to work in a burst of productivity. In 1537, aged 25, he established a reputation with his map of the Holy Land which he researched, engraved, printed (and partly published) himself.

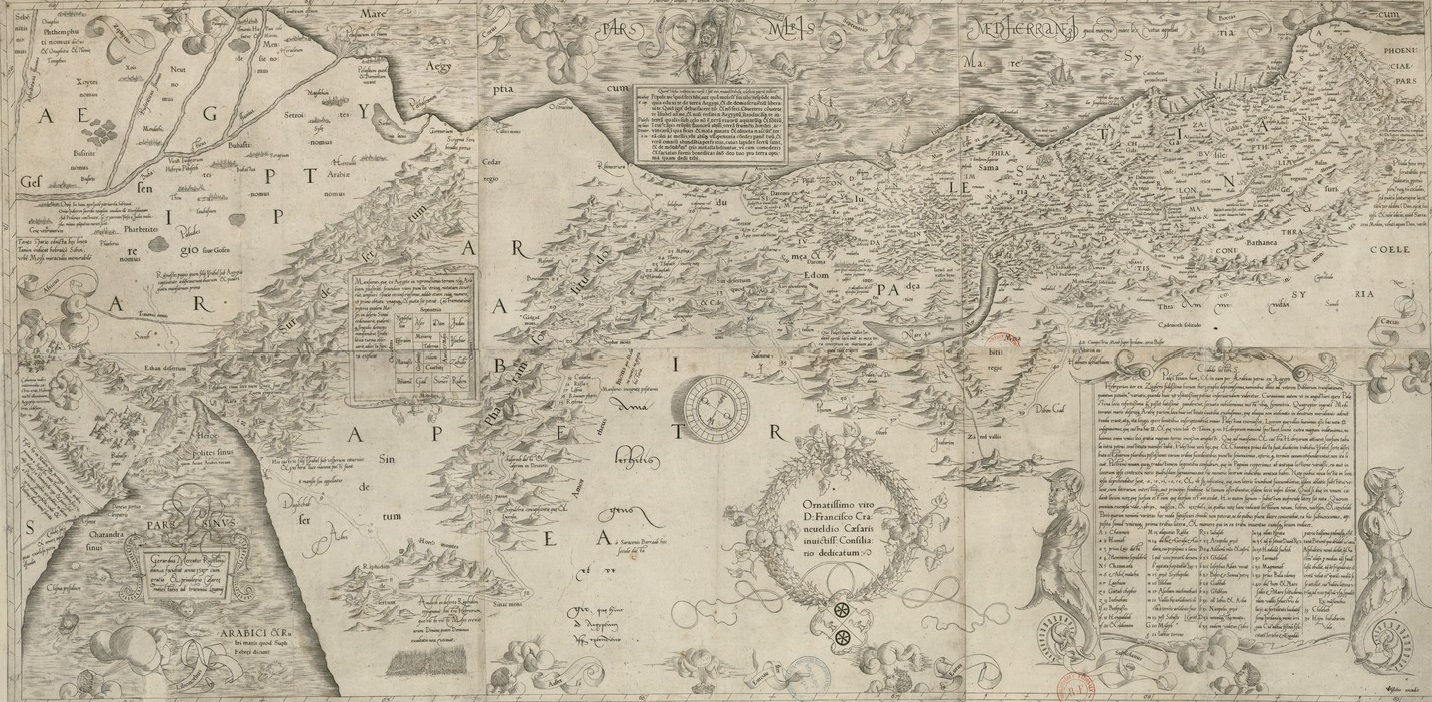
Palestine (west at the top), 1537

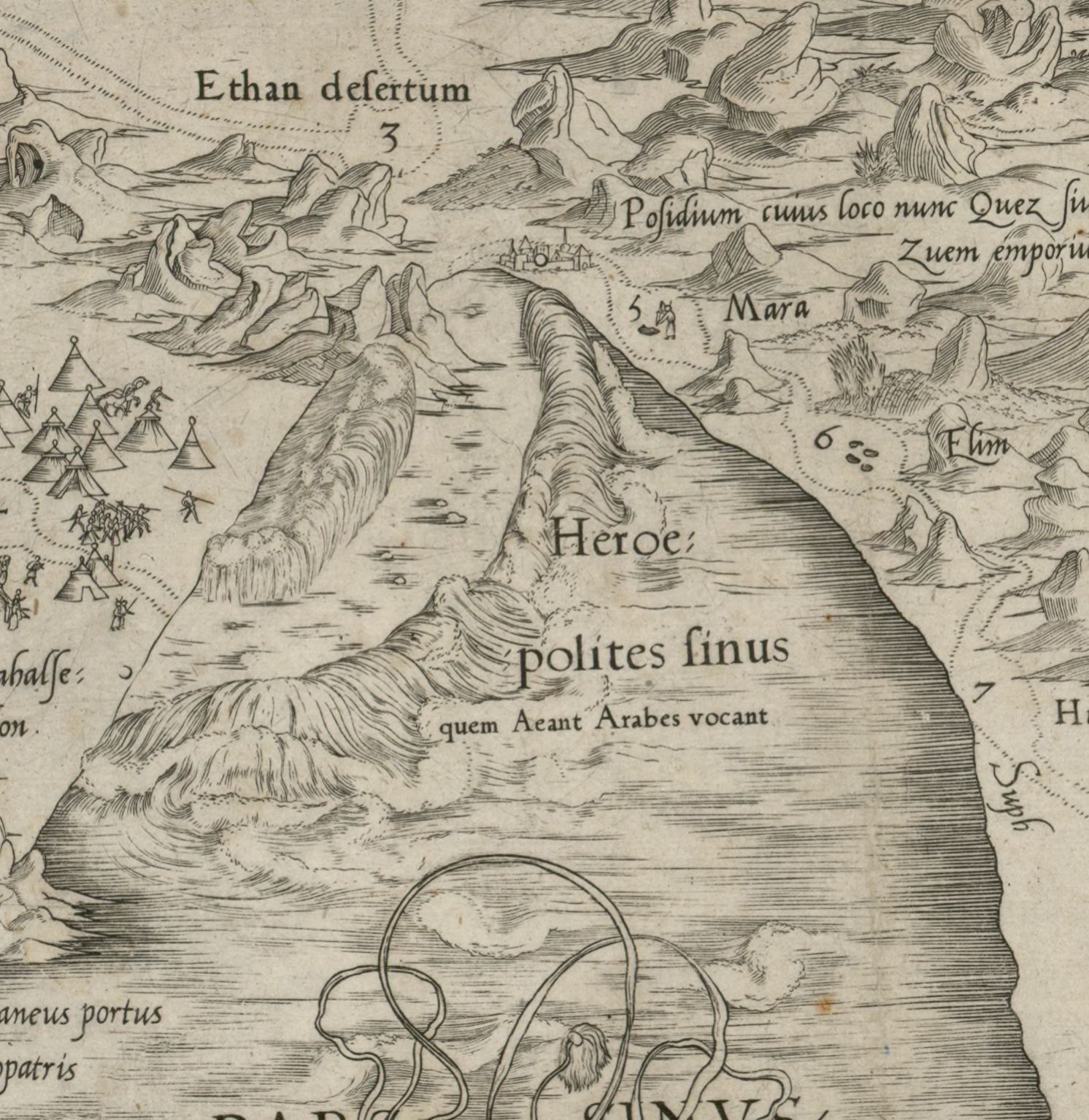
Detail: the Red Sea parted

A year later, in 1538, he produced his first map of the world, usually referred to as Orbis Imago. (Note: Orbis Imago is a reference to the text in the legend (cartouche) at the top centre of the map. The first sentence contains the phrase hic vides orbis imaginem which translates as this image of the globe that you see. Text) From 1539 to 1540 he made a map of Flanders and in 1541 a terrestrial globe. All four works were received with acclaim, and they sold in large numbers. The dedications of three of these works witness Mercator's access to influential patrons: the Holy Land was dedicated to Franciscus van Cranevelt who sat on the Great Council of Mechelen, the map of Flanders was dedicated to the emperor himself and the globe was dedicated to Nicholas Perrenot, the emperor's chief advisor. The dedicatee of the world map was more surprising: Johannes Drosius, a fellow student who, as an unorthodox priest, may well have been suspected of Lutheran heresy. Given that the symbolism of the Orbis Imago map also reflected a Lutheran view point, Mercator was exposing himself to criticism from the hardline theologians of Leuven .

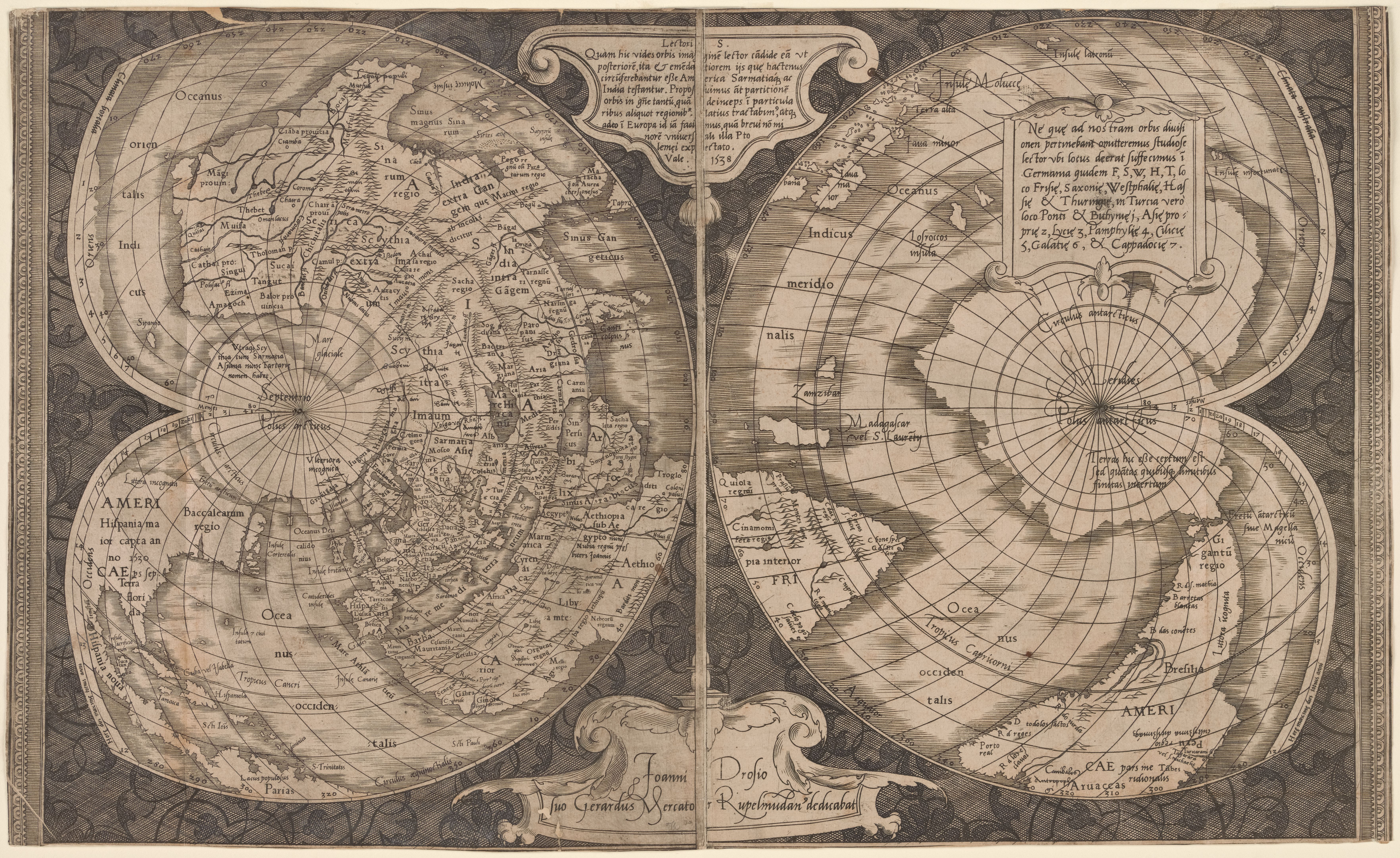
World map, 1538

Flanders, 1540

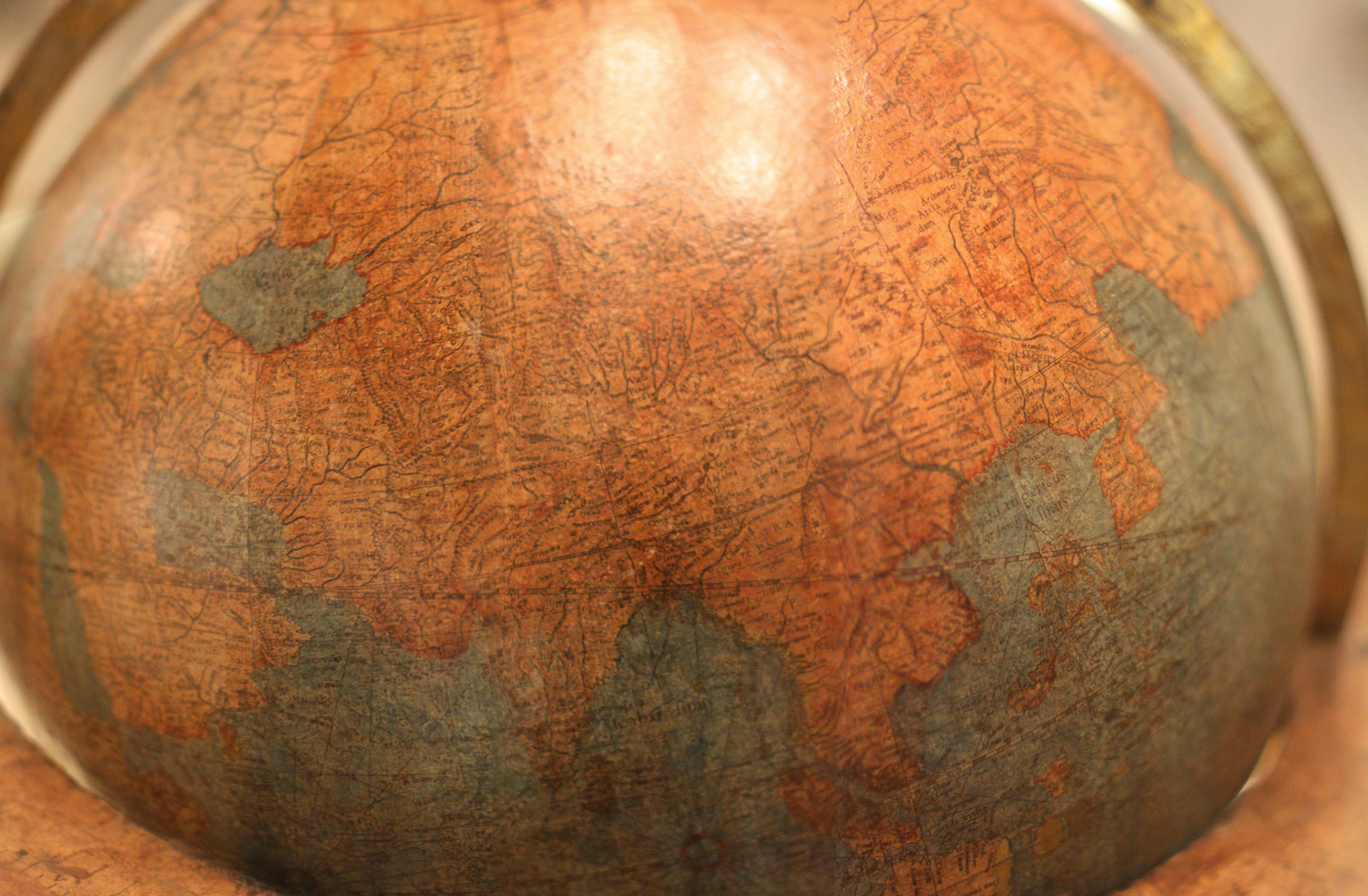
Globe, 1541

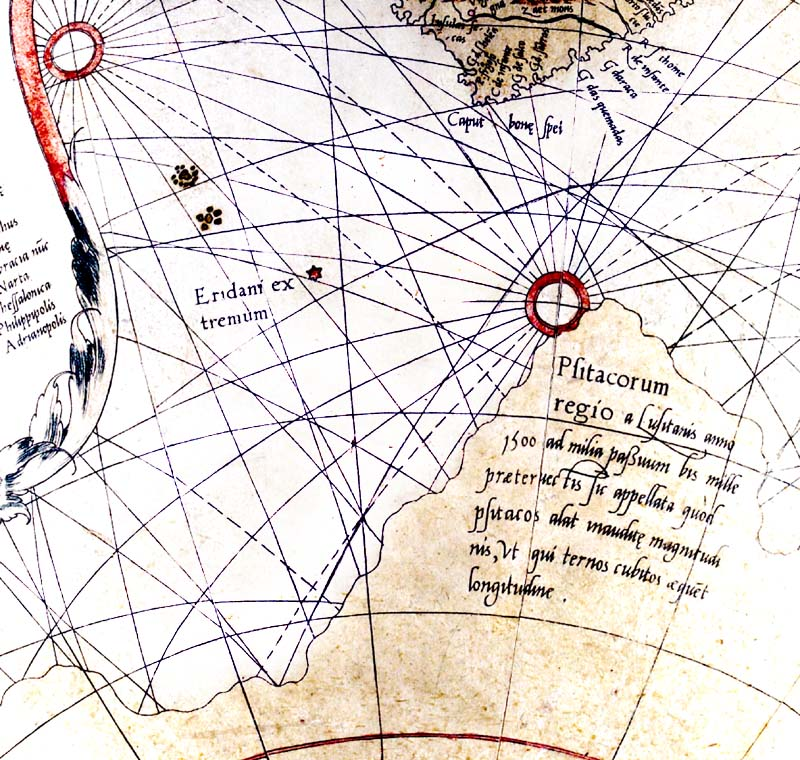
Globe with rhumb lines

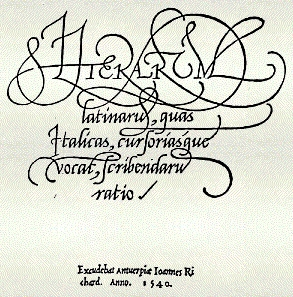
The title page of Literarum Latinarum

In between these works, he found time to write Literarum latinarum, a small instruction manual on writing the italic script. The italic script (or chancery cursive) reached the Low Countries from Italy at the beginning of the sixteenth century and it is recorded as a form of typescript in Leuven in 1522. It was much favoured by humanist scholars who enjoyed its elegance and clarity as well as the rapid fluency that could be attained with practice, but it was not employed for formal purposes such as globes, maps and scientific instruments (which typically used Roman capitals or gothic script). Mercator first applied the italic script to the globe of Gemma Frisius and thereafter to all his works, with ever-increasing elegance. The title page of his instruction manual is an illustration of the decorative style he developed. (Note: The top line of the title page spells out a highly decorated form of the word LITERARUM.)

In 1542, the thirty-year-old must have been feeling confident about his future prospects when he suffered two major interruptions to his life. First, Leuven was besieged by the troops of the Duke of Cleves, a Lutheran sympathiser who, with French support, was set on exploiting unrest in the Low Countries to his own ends. (This was the same duke to whom Mercator turned for assistance ten years later.) The siege was lifted but the financial losses to the town and its traders, including Mercator, were great. The second interruption was potentially deadly: the Inquisition called.

=== Persecution, 1543 ===
At no time in his life did Mercator claim to be a Lutheran, but there are many hints that he had sympathies in that direction. As a child, called Geert, he was surrounded by adults who were possibly followers of Geert Groote, who placed meditation, contemplation, and biblical study over ritual and liturgy—and who also founded the school of the Brethren of the Common Life at 's-Hertogenbosch. As an adult, Mercator had family connections to Molanus, a religious reformer who later had to flee Leuven. Mercator was also a close friend and correspondent of Philip Melanchthon, one of the principal Lutheran reformers. (Note: Some of the correspondence of Mercator and Melanchthon has been preserved. See Van Durme 1959) Study of the Bible was something that was central to Mercator's life and it was the cause of the early philosophical doubts that caused him so much trouble during his student days, doubts which some of his teachers would have considered tantamount to heresy. His visits to the free-thinking Franciscans in Mechelen may have attracted the attention of the theologians at the university, amongst whom were two senior figures of the Inquisition, Jacobus Latomus and Ruard Tapper. The words of the latter on the death of heretics convey the atmosphere of that time: (Note: The persecution of heretics is discussed in Crane 2003, p. 149, Chapter 14)

It is no great matter whether those that die on this account be guilty or innocent, provided we terrify the people by these examples; which generally succeeds best, when persons eminent for learning, riches, nobility or high stations, are thus sacrificed.

— Brandt & Chamberlayne 1740

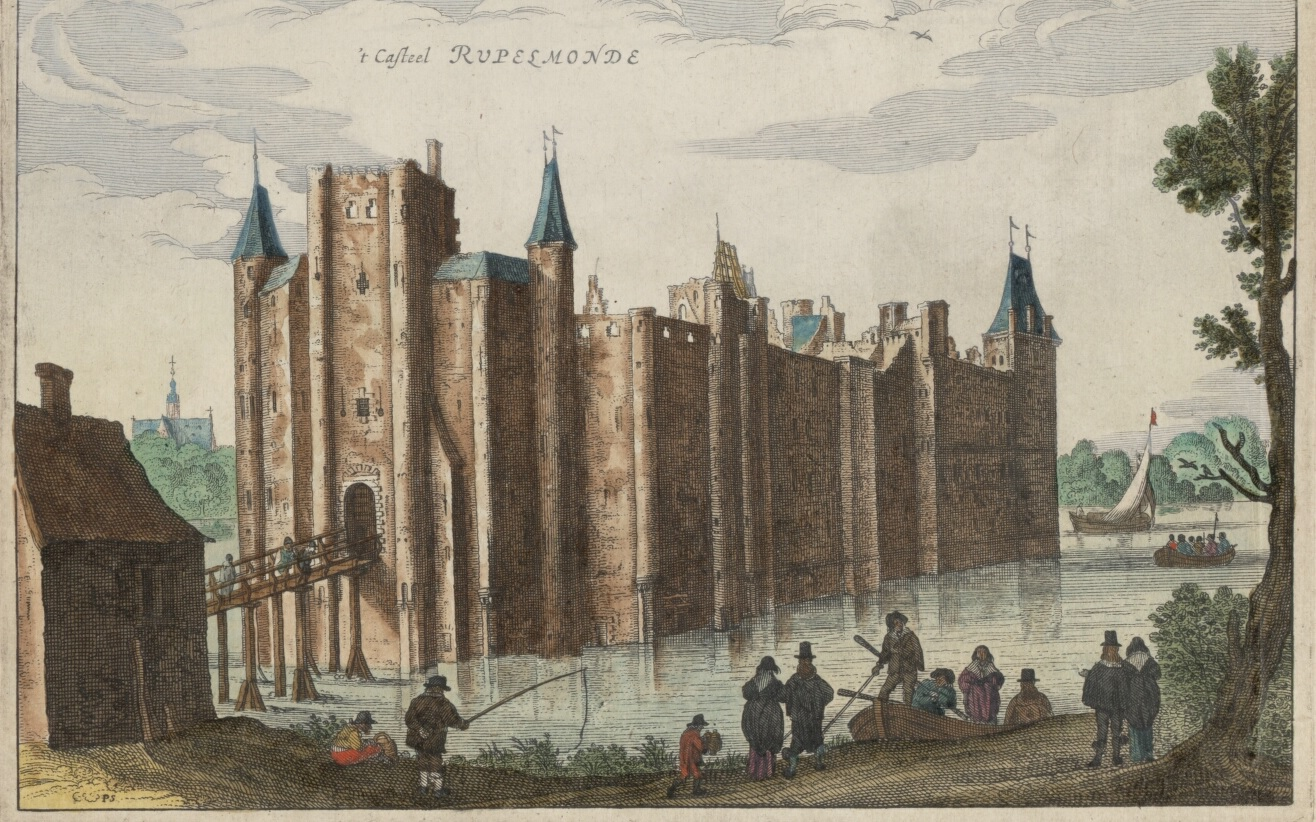
Rupelmonde castle, now in Belgium, from Flandria Illustrata (1641)

It may well have been these Inquisitors who, in 1543, decided that Mercator was eminent enough to be sacrificed. His name appeared on a list of 52 Lutheran heretics which included an architect, a sculptor, a former rector of the university, a monk, three priests and many others. All were arrested except Mercator, who had left Leuven for Rupelmonde on business concerning the estate of his recently deceased uncle Gisbert. His absence made matters worse, for he was now classified as a fugitive who, by fleeing arrest, had proved his own guilt.

Mercator was apprehended in Rupelmonde and imprisoned in the castle. He was accused of suspicious correspondence with the Franciscan friars in Mechelen but no incriminating writings were uncovered in his home or at the friary in Mechelen. At the same time his well-placed friends petitioned on his behalf, (Note: It is known that Pieter de Corte, an ex-rector of the university, wrote to Queen Maria of Hungary, governor of the province. See Crane 2003, p. 156, Chapter 15) but whether his friend Antoine Perrenot was helpful is unknown: Perrenot, as a bishop, would have to support the activities of the Inquisition. After seven months, Mercator was released for lack of evidence against him but others on the list suffered torture and execution: two men were burnt at the stake, another was beheaded and two women were entombed alive.

=== Leuven, 1543–1552 ===
Mercator never committed any of his prison experiences to paper; all he would say was that he had suffered an "unjust persecution". For the rest of his time in Leuven, he kept his religious thoughts to himself and returned to work. His experience with the Inquisition did not affect his relationship with the court, and Nicholas Perrenot recommended him to the emperor as a maker of superb instruments. The outcome was an Imperial order for globes, compasses, astrolabe and astronomical rings. They were ready in 1545 and the emperor granted the royal seal of approval to Mercator's workshop. The instruments were soon destroyed in the course of the emperor's military ventures and Mercator had to construct a second set, now lost. He also returned to his work on a large up-to-date and highly detailed wall map of Europe which was, he had already claimed on his 1538 world map, very well advanced. It proved to be a vast task and he, perfectionist that he was, seemed unable to cut short his ever-expanding research and publish what he had; it was another ten years before the map appeared.

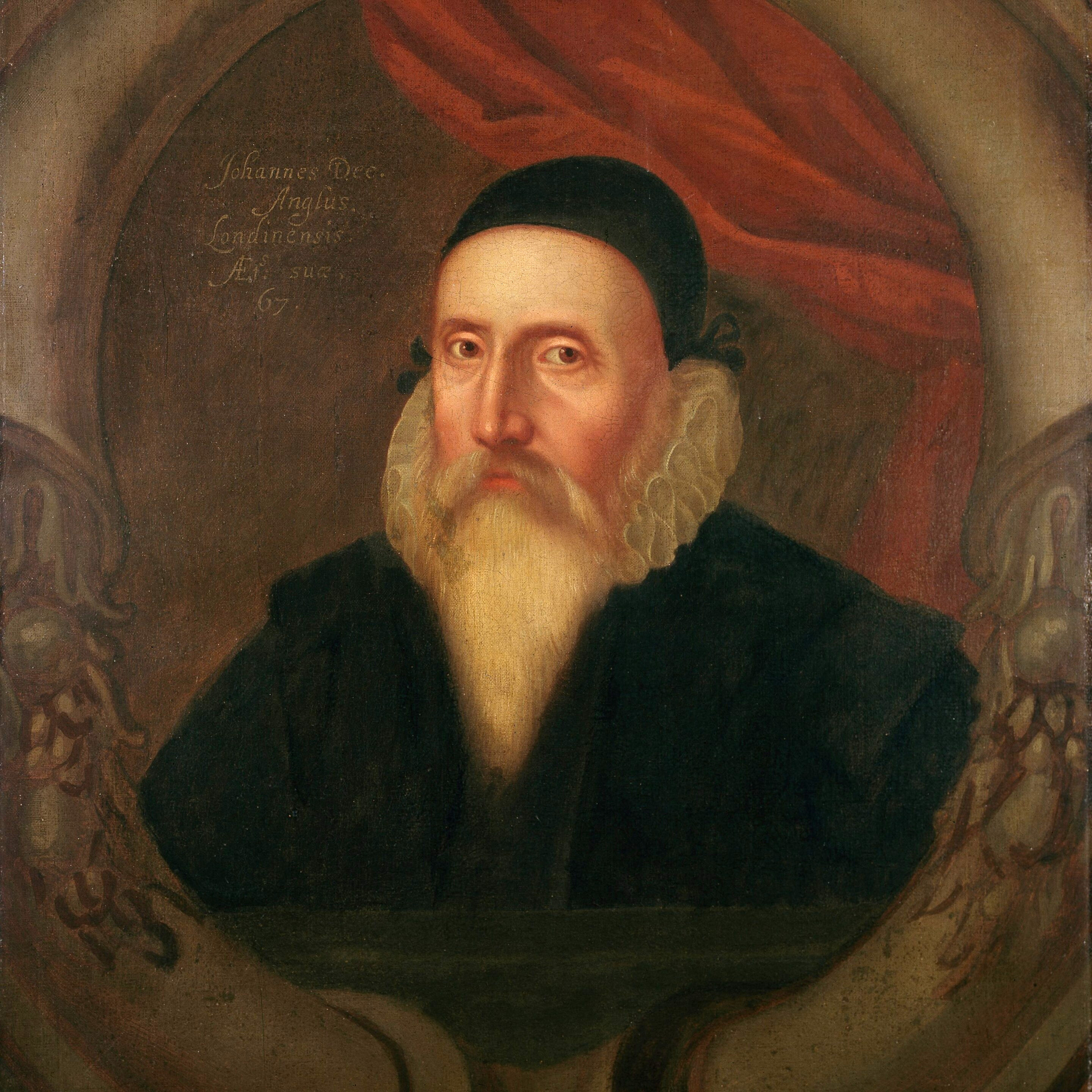
John Dee

In 1547 Mercator was visited by the nineteen-year-old John Dee who, on completion of his undergraduate studies in Cambridge (1547), "went beyond the seas to speak and confer with some learned men". Dee and Mercator were both passionately interested in the same topics and they quickly established a close rapport which lasted throughout their lives. In 1548, Dee returned to Leuven (spelled Louvain in Dee's text) and registered as a student; for three years, he was constantly in Mercator's company. Apart from a possible short visit to Duisburg in 1562, the two men did not meet, but they corresponded frequently and by good fortune a number of their letters are preserved. Dee took maps, globes and astronomical instruments back to England and in return furnished Mercator with the latest English texts and new geographical knowledge arising from the English explorations of the world. Forty years later, they were still co-operating, Dee using Mercator's maps to convince the English court to finance Martin Frobisher's expeditions and Mercator still avidly seeking information of new territories.

Mercator's final success in Leuven was the 1551 celestial globe, the partner of his terrestrial globe of 1541. The records of the Plantin Press show that several hundred such pairs of globes were sold before the end of the century despite their high price—in 1570 they sold at 25 carolus guilders for a pair. Celestial globes were a necessary adjunct to the intellectual life of rich patrons (Note: Note the globes in Holbein's ambassadors) and academics alike, for both astronomical and astrological studies, two subjects which were strongly entwined in the sixteenth century. Twenty-two pairs are still in existence.

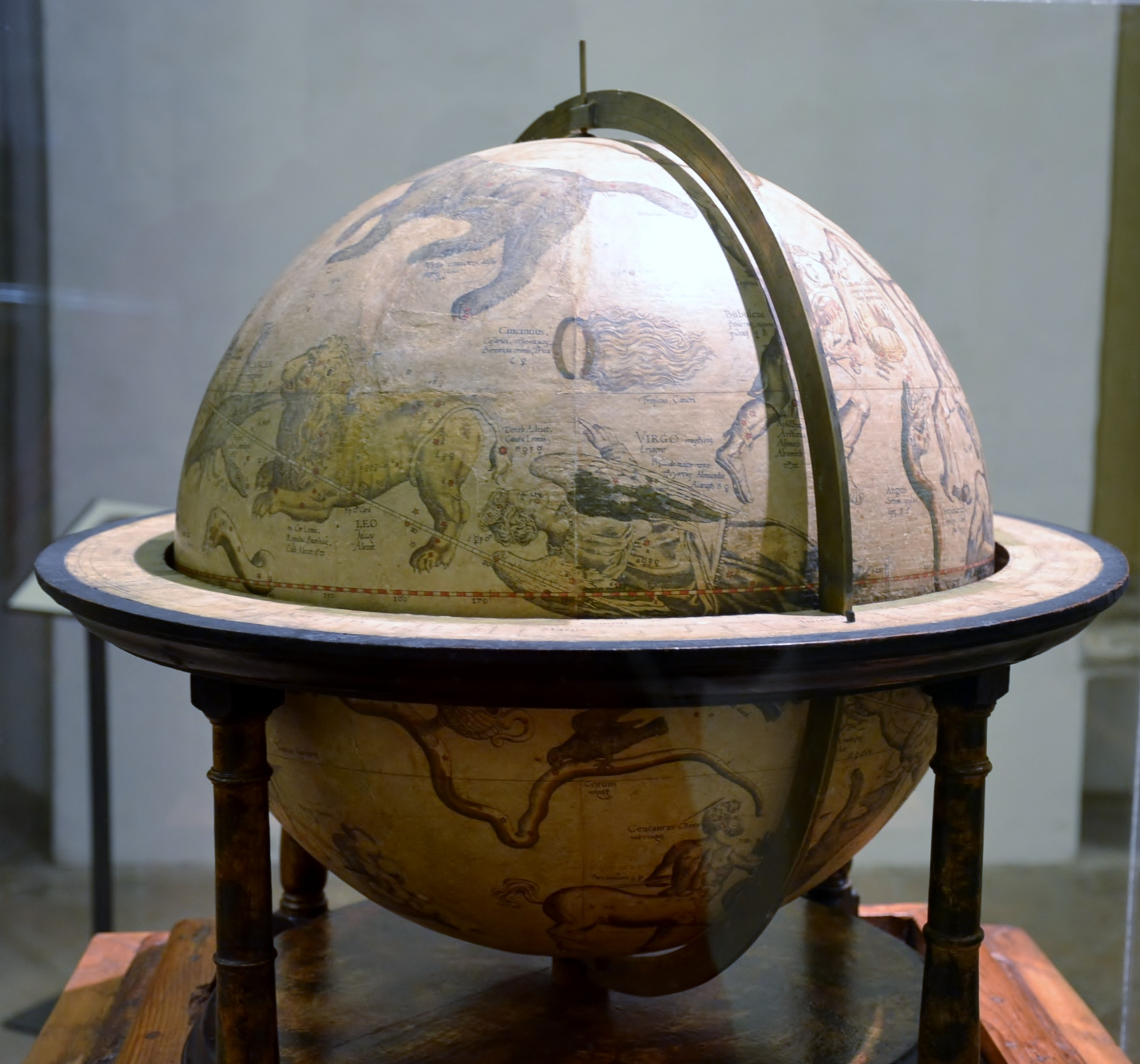
Celestial globe 1551

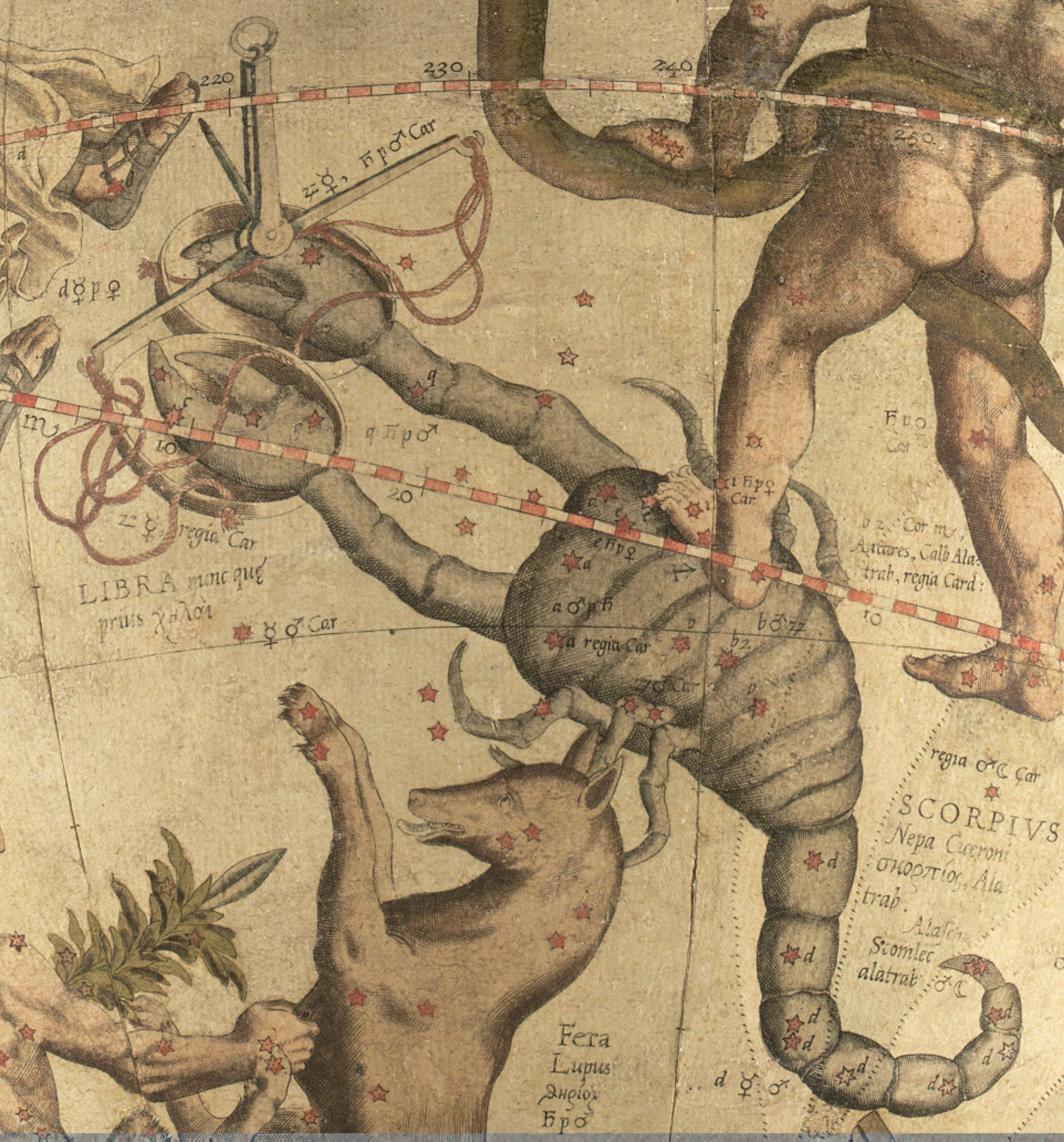
Detail: Scorpio et Libra

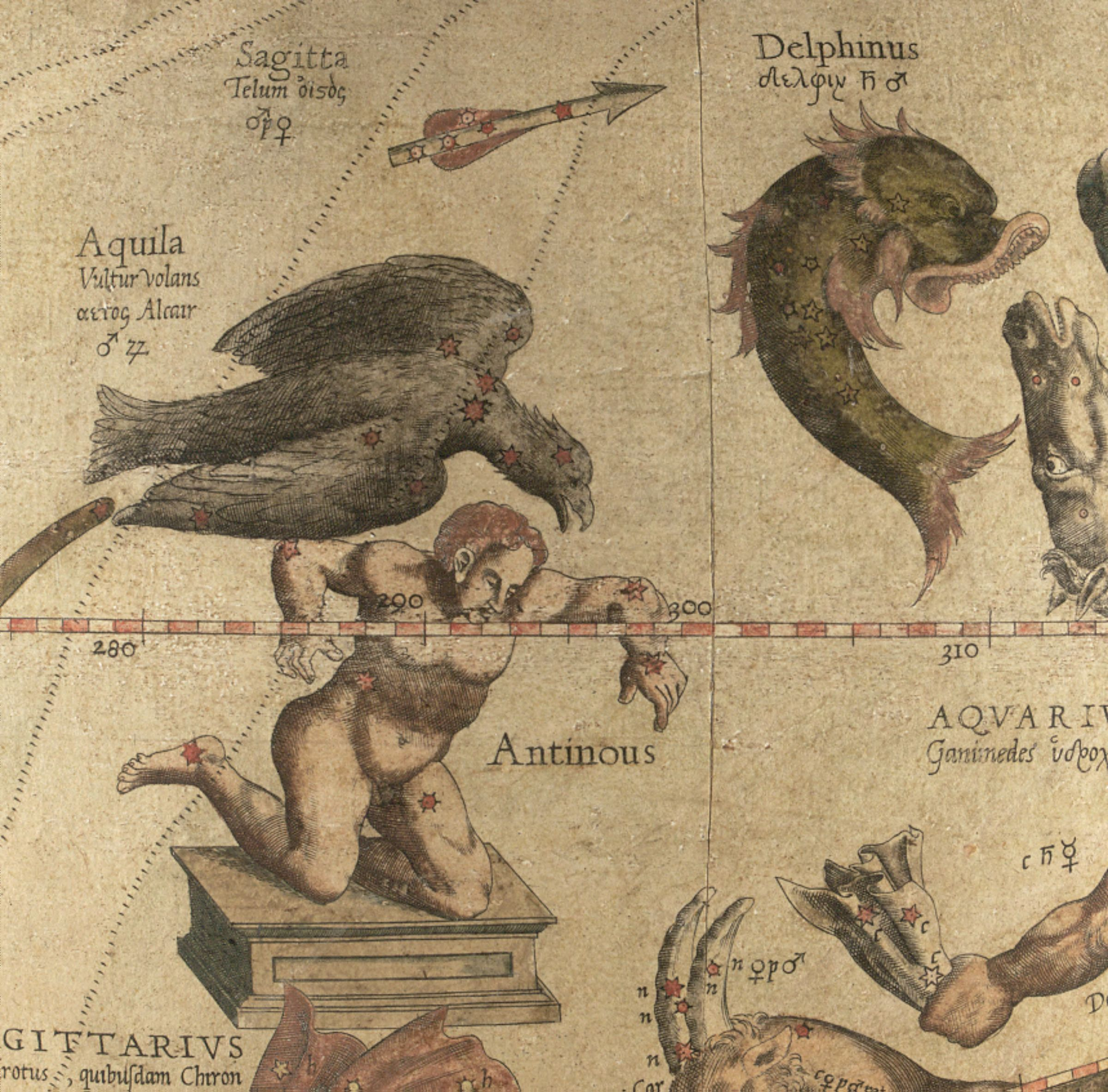
Sagitta et Aquila

=== Duisburg, 1552–1594 ===
In 1552, Mercator, aged 40, moved from Leuven to Duisburg in the Duchy of Cleves (in modern-day Germany), where he spent the rest of his life. He never made public his reasons for moving, but several factors may have been involved: not having been born in Brabant he could never be a full citizen of Leuven; Catholic intolerance of religious dissidents in the Low Countries was becoming ever more aggressive and a man once suspected of heresy would never be trusted; the Erasmian constitution and the religious tolerance of Cleves must have appeared attractive; there was to be a new university in Duisburg and teachers would be required. He was not alone; over the years to come many more fled the oppressive Catholicism of Brabant and Flanders to more-tolerant cities such as Duisburg. (Note: Other refugees in Duisburg included Johannes Oeste (or Otho), Georg Cassander and Cornelius Wouters. See Crane 2003, p. 191, Chapter 19)

The peaceful town of Duisburg, untroubled by political and religious unrest, was the perfect place for the flowering of his talent. Mercator quickly established himself as a man of standing in the town: an intellectual of note, a publisher of maps, and a maker of instruments and globes. (Note: Mercator's workshops produced items such as globes in a steady stream. The records of the Plantin Press show that they received 1150 maps and globes from Mercator over a thirty year period (Clair 1987; Voets 1962, pp. 171–232; Imhof 2012, pp. 103–114): in particular they sold 185 copies of the 1569 world map in three years. At the same time Mercator was selling items at the regular international Frankfurt Book Fair and selling direct from his own workshop.) Mercator never accepted the privileges and voting rights of a burgher for they came with military responsibilities which conflicted with his pacifist and neutral stance. Nevertheless, he was on good terms with the wealthier citizens and a close friend of Walter Ghim, the twelve-time mayor and Mercator's future biographer.

Mercator was welcomed by Duke Wilhelm who appointed him as court cosmographer. There is no precise definition of this term other than that it certainly comprehends the disciplines of geography and astronomy but at that time it would also include astrology and chronology (as a history of the world from the creation). All of these were among Mercator's accomplishments but his patron's first call on his services was a mundane survey of the disputed boundary between the Duke's territory of the County of Mark and the Duchy of Westphalia.

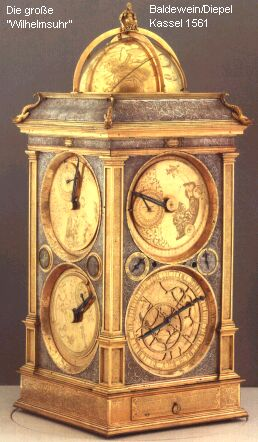
Astronomical clock with rotating globes

Around this time Mercator also received and executed a very special order for the Holy Roman Emperor, Charles V: a pair of small globes, the inner ("fist-size") Earth was made of wood and the outer celestial sphere was made of blown crystal glass engraved with diamond and inlaid with gold. He presented them to the emperor in Brussels who awarded him the title Imperatoris domesticus (a member of the Imperial household). The globes are lost but Mercator describes them in a letter to Philip Melanchthon (Note: Melanchthon is a significant correspondent of Mercator since he was one of the founders of Lutheranism, second only to Luther.) in which he declares that the globes were rotated on the top of an astronomical clock made for Charles V by Juanelo Turriano (Janellus). (Note: A speculative model of the double globe was constructed by Wilhelm Kruecken for the Duisburg commemorations of the 400th anniversary of Mercator's death.) The clock had eight dials which showed the positions of the moon, stars and planets. The illustration shows a similar clock made by the German craftsman Baldewein at roughly the same time.

Mercator's theory of magnetism

Earlier, Mercator had also presented Charles V with an important pamphlet on the use of globes and instruments and his latest (incorrect) ideas on magnetism: Declaratio insigniorum utilitatum quae sunt in globo terrestri : coelesti, et annulo astronomico (A description of the most important applications of the terrestrial and celestial globes and the astronomical ring). The first section is prefaced by Mercator's ideas on magnetism, the central thesis being that magnetic compasses are attracted to a single pole (not a dipole) along great circles through that pole. He then shows how to calculate the position of the pole if the deviation is known at two known positions (Leuven and Corvo in the Azores): he finds that it must be at latitude 73°2' and longitude 169°34'. He also includes his calculation of the longitude difference between the pole and an arbitrary position; if his theory had been correct, he would have been the discoverer of the solution to the longitude problem. More of his comments on magnetism may be found in an earlier letter to Perrenot (Note: Mercator's letter to Perrenot is available on wikiquote (along with an introduction by Harradon).) and on the later world map. (Note: For magnetism on the world map see Mercator 1569 world map#Prime meridian and magnetic pole. Note that he calculated two possible positions.) In Hogenberg's famous portrait of Mercator, his dividers are set on the position of the magnetic pole.

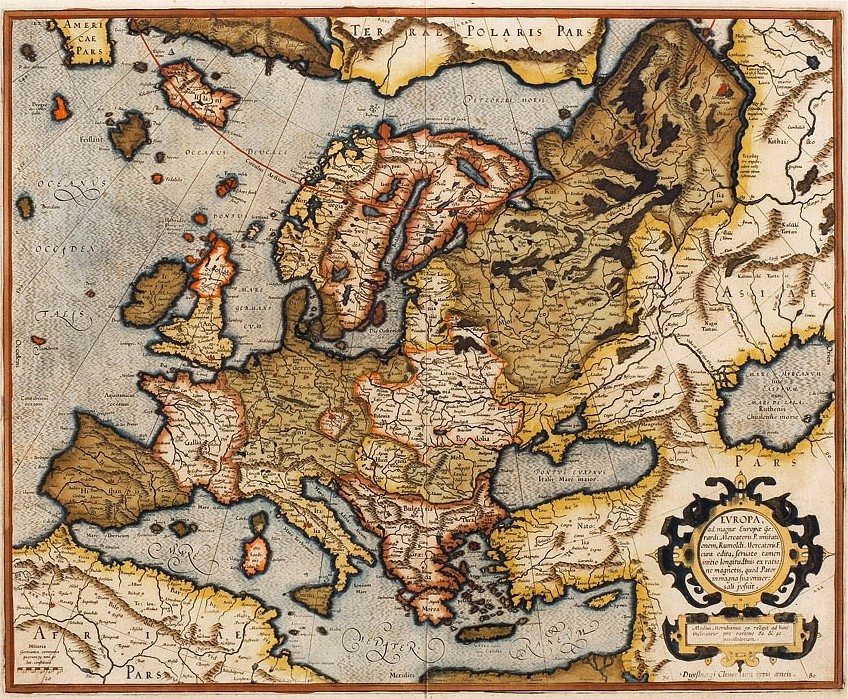
An updated version of the 1554 map of Europe as it appears in the 1595 atlas

In 1554, Mercator published the long-awaited wall map of Europe, dedicating it to his friend Antoine (now Cardinal) Perrenot. He had worked at it for more than twelve years, collecting, comparing, collating and rationalising a vast amount of data, and the result was a map of unprecedented detail and accuracy. (Note: For a description see Crane 2003, Chapter 17) It "attracted more praise from scholars everywhere than any similar geographical work which has ever been brought out". It also sold in large quantities for much of the rest of the century, with a second edition in 1572 and a third edition in the atlas of 1595. (Note: For example, Plantin alone sold 400 copies of the map of Europe in 1566, twelve years later.)

The proposed university in Duisburg failed to materialise because the papal licence to found the university was delayed twelve years and by then Duke Wilhelm had lost interest. It was another 90 years before Duisburg had its university. On the other hand, no papal permit was required to establish the Akademisches Gymnasium where, in 1559, Mercator was invited to teach mathematics with cosmography. One year later, in 1560, he secured the appointment of his friend Jan Vermeulen (Molanus) as rector and then blessed Vermeulen's marriage to Mercator's daughter Emerantia. His sons were now growing to manhood and he encouraged them to embark on his own profession. Arnold, the eldest, had produced his first map (of Iceland) in 1558 and later took over the day-to-day running of Mercator's enterprises. Bartholemew, his second son, showed great academic promise and in 1562 (aged 22) he took over the teaching of his father's three-year-long lecture course—after Mercator had taught it only once. Much to Mercator's grief, Bartholemew died at the age of 28 in 1568. Rumold, the third son, spent a large part of his life in London's publishing houses providing for Mercator a vital link to the new discoveries of the Elizabethan age. In 1587 Rumold returned to Duisburg and later, in 1594, it fell to him to publish their father's remaining works.

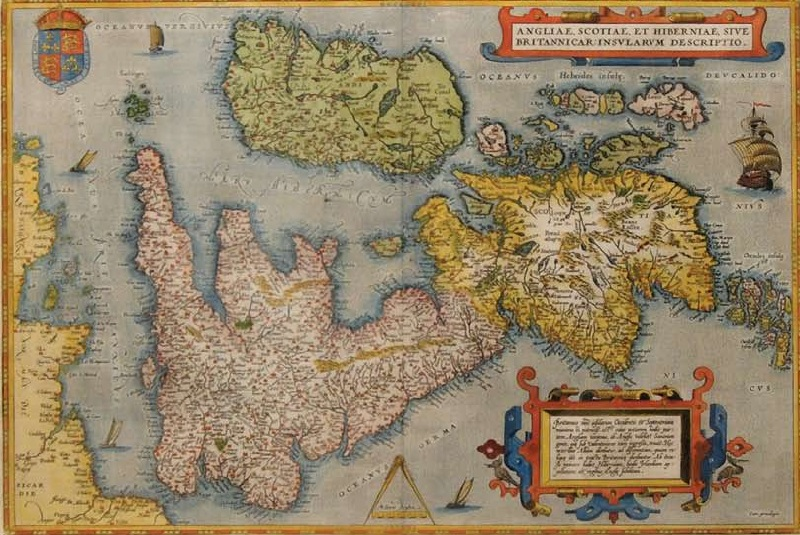
Abraham Ortelius copy of the 1564 map of Britain

In 1564, Mercator published his map of Britain, a map of greatly improved accuracy which far surpassed any of his previous representations. The circumstances were unusual. It is the only one of his maps without a dedicatee, and in the text engraved on the map he pointedly denies being its author and claims that he is merely engraving and printing it for a "very good friend". The identity of neither the author nor the friend has been established but it has been suggested that the map was created by a Scottish Catholic priest called John Elder who smuggled it to some French clergy known to Antoine Perrenot, Mercator's friend. Mercator's omission of credit for the work shows that he was aware of the political nature of this pro-Catholic map which showed all the Catholic religious foundations and omitted those created by the Protestant Henry VIII, and was engraved with text demeaning the history of England and praising that of Catholic Ireland and Scotland. It was invaluable as an accurate guide for the planned Catholic invasion of England by Philip II of Spain.

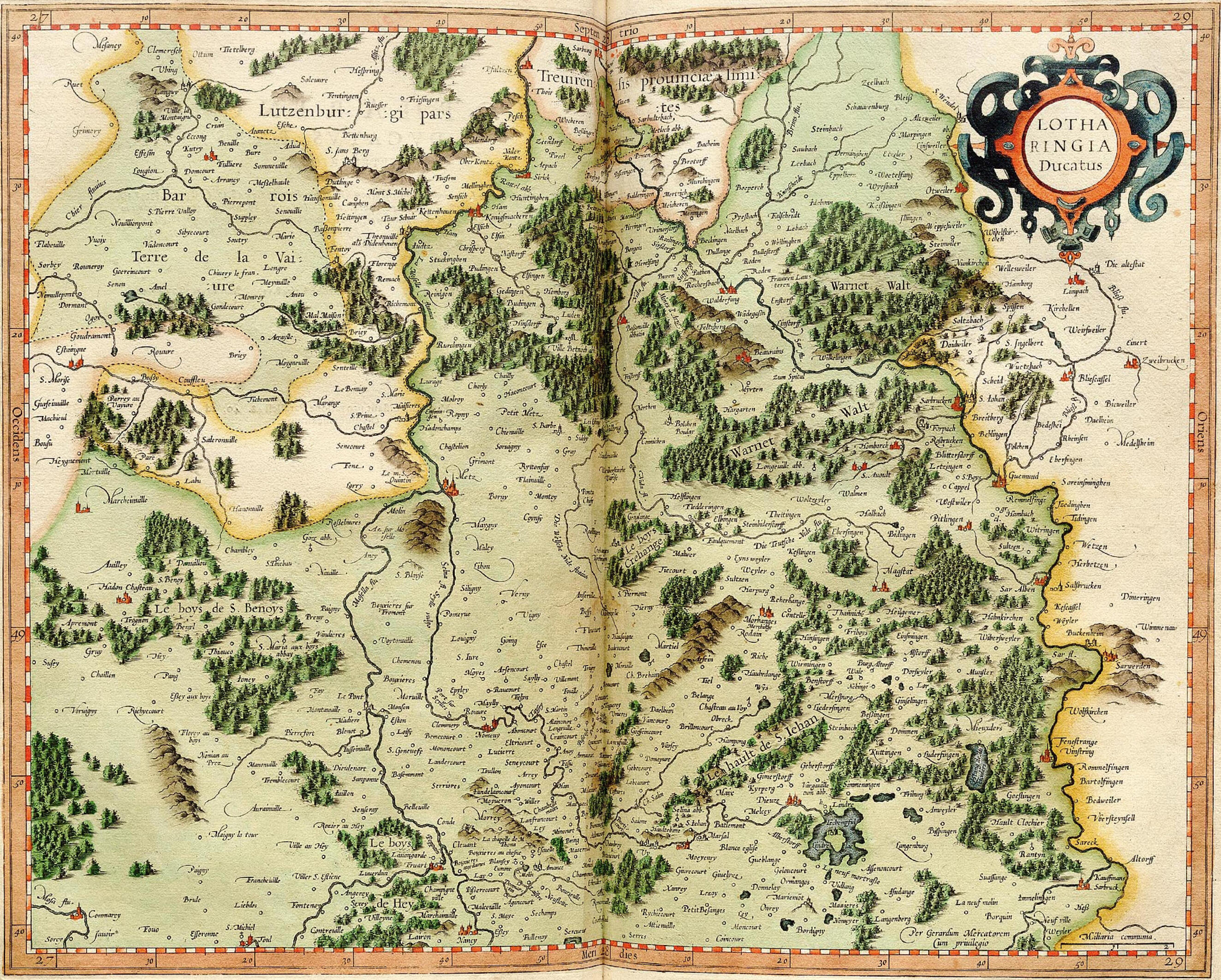
Lotharingia (Lorraine) as it appeared in the 1595 atlas

As soon as the 1564 map of Britain was published, Mercator was invited to undertake the surveying and mapping of Lorraine (Lotharingia). This was a new venture for him in the sense that never before had he collected the raw data for a new regional map. He was then 52, already an old man by the norms of that century, and he may well have had reservations about the undertaking. Accompanied by his son Bartholemew, Mercator meticulously triangulated his way around the forests, hills and steep-sided valleys of Lorraine, difficult terrain and as different from the Low Countries as anything could be. He never committed anything to paper, but he may have confided in his friend Ghim, who later wrote: "The journey through Lorraine gravely imperiled his life and so weakened him that he came very near to a serious breakdown and mental derangement as a result of his terrifying experiences." Mercator returned home to convalesce, leaving Bartholemew to complete the survey. No map was published at the time, but Mercator did provide a single drawn copy for the Duke and later he incorporated this map into his atlas.

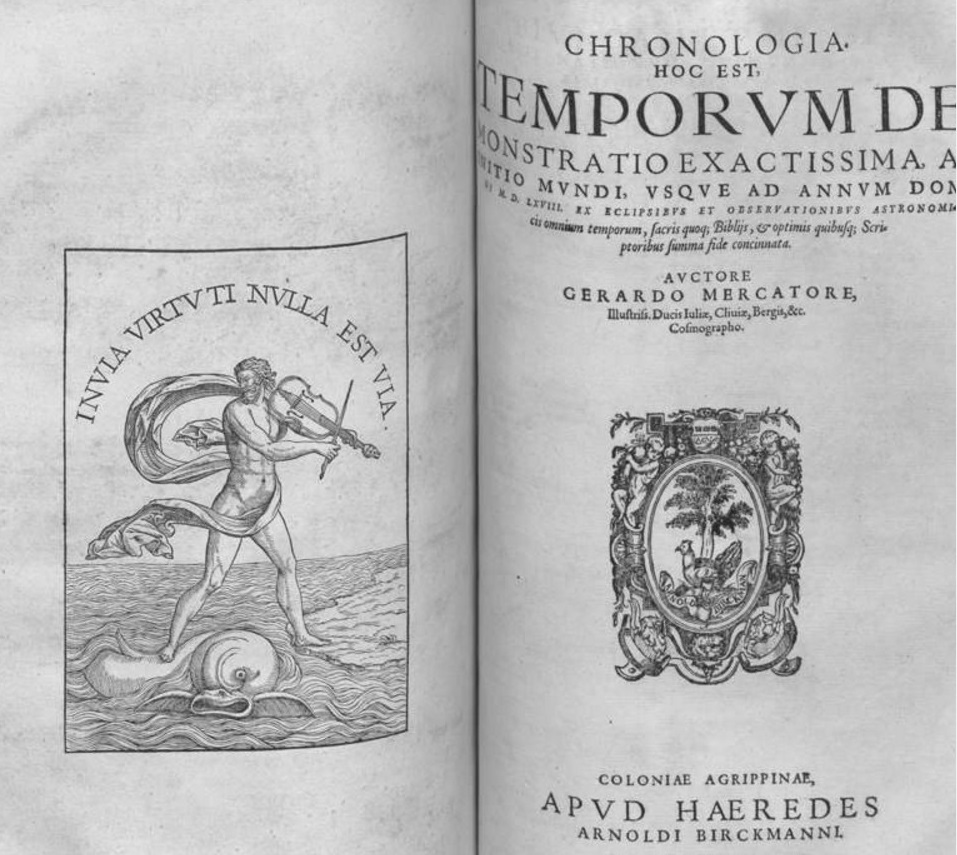
Chronologia title page (Note: For the title see Mercator 1569. The text over the illustration is in via virtuti nulla est via, meaning no way is impassable to virtue (Ovid).)

The trip to Lorraine in 1564 was a setback for his health, but he soon recovered and embarked on his greatest project yet, a project which extended far beyond his cartographic interests. The first element was the Chronologia, a list of all significant events since the beginning of the world compiled from his literal reading of the Bible and no less than 123 other authors of genealogies and histories of every empire known to have existed. Mercator was the first to link historical dates of solar and lunar eclipses to Julian dates calculated mathematically from his knowledge of the motions of the sun, moon and Earth. He then fixed the dates of other events in Babylonian, Greek, Hebrew and Roman calendars relative to the eclipses that they recorded. He fixed his origin of time using the genealogies of the Bible, from which he calculated 3,965 years before the birth of Christ. This 400-page volume was greeted with acclaim by scholars throughout Europe and Mercator himself considered it his greatest achievement up to that time. On the other hand, the Catholic Church placed the work on the Index Librorum Prohibitorum (List of Prohibited Books) because Mercator included the deeds of Martin Luther in its timeline. Had he published such a work in Louvain, it would have laid him open to new charges of heresy. (Note: In the two online copies of the Chronologia listed under Mercator 1569 the first includes a mention of Luther for the year 1516 (bottom left), "Bayerische Staatsbibliothek". In the second the paragraph has been obliterated HathiTrust. apud haeredes Arnoldi Birckmanni. 1569.)

The Chronologia developed into an even wider project, the Cosmographia, a description of the whole universe. Mercator's outline was (1) the creation of the world; (2) the description of the heavens (astronomy and astrology); (3) the description of the earth comprising modern geography, the geography of Ptolemy and the geography of the ancients; (4) genealogy and history of the states; and (5) chronology. Of these the chronology had already been accomplished, the account of the creation and the modern maps appeared in the atlas of 1595, his edition of Ptolemy appeared in 1578, but the ancient geography and the description of the heavens were never produced.

The 1569 Mercator map of the world (Higher-resolution images)

As the Chronologia was going to press in 1569, Mercator also published what became his most famous map: Nova et Aucta Orbis Terrae Descriptio ad Usum Navigantium Emendate Accommodata ('A new and more complete representation of the terrestrial globe properly adapted for use in navigation'). As mariners had started to explore the oceans in the Age of Discovery the problem of accurate navigation had become more pressing. Their calculations of their location could be a hundred miles off after a long voyage, because a course of constant direction at sea (a rhumb line) did not correspond to a straight line on their chart. Mercator's solution was to make the scale of his chart increase with latitude in a very special way, such that all rhumb lines became straight lines. Exactly how he arrived at the required solution is not recorded in any of his own written works, but modern scholars suggest that he used the tables of rhumbs devised by Pedro Nunes. (Note: De Graeve 2012a has shown that Mercator's library contained a copy of the Theory of the Loxodrome by Pedro Nuñez. This was published in 1566, three years before Mercator completed his map.) Its large size (being a wall map) meant that it did not find favour for use on board ship but, within a hundred years of its creation, the Mercator projection became the standard for marine charts throughout the world and continues to be so used to the present day. Though very effective for marine navigation, the projection is clearly unsuitable as a description of the land masses on account of its manifest distortion at high latitudes, and its more general use as a map is now deprecated: other projections are more suitable. (Note: See the discussion at Mercator projection.) Although several hundred copies of the map were produced it soon became out of date as new discoveries showed Mercator's inaccuracies (on places poorly known in his time) and his speculations (for example, on the arctic and the southern continent). (Note: For further comments on the inaccuracies of the 1569 map see Mercator 1569 world map#Geography. For a discussion of the southern continent in particular see Zuber 2011)

Around this time, the marshall of Jülich approached Mercator and asked him to prepare a set of European regional maps which would serve for a grand tour by his patron's son, the crown prince Johannes. This remarkable collection has been preserved and is now held in the British Library under the title Atlas of Europe (although Mercator never called it that). Many of its pages were assembled from dissected Mercator maps and in addition there are thirty maps from the Theatrum Orbis Terrarum of Abraham Ortelius. (Note: A facsimile of the Mercator contributions in the Atlas of Europe has been published by Watelet 1997)

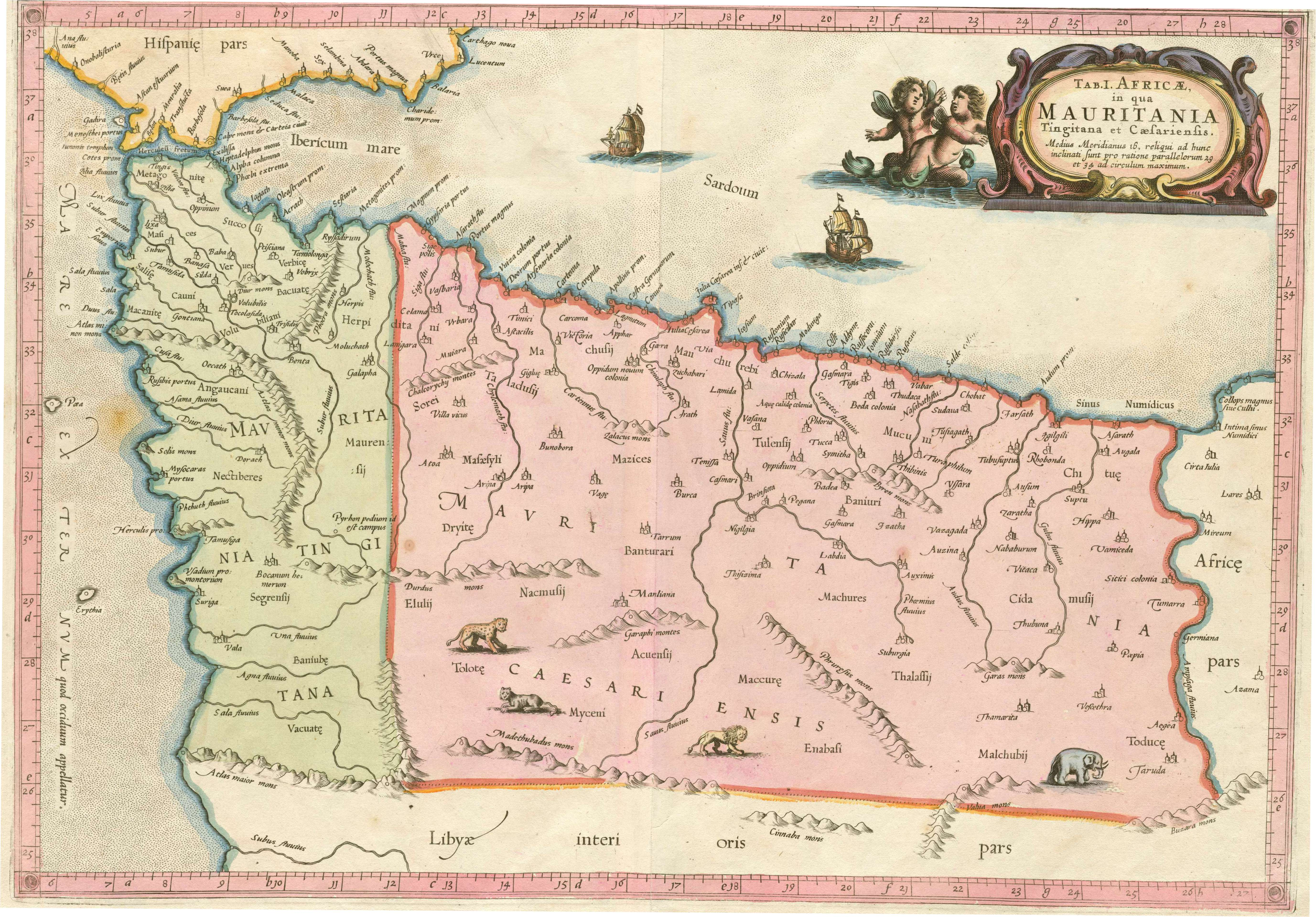
Mauretania in the 1578 Ptolemy

Apart from a revision of the map of Europe in 1572, there would be no more large wall maps and Mercator began to address the other tasks that he had outlined in the Cosmographia. The first of these was a new definitive version of Ptolemy's maps. That he should wish to do so may seem strange given that, at the same time, he was planning very different modern maps and other mapmakers, such as his friend Abraham Ortelius, had forsaken Ptolemy completely. It was essentially an act of reverence by one scholar for another, a final epitaph for the Ptolemy who had inspired Mercator's love of geography early in his life. He compared the great many editions of the Ptolemy's written Geographia, which described his two projections and listed the latitude and longitude of some 8000 places, as well as the many different versions of the printed maps which had appeared over the previous one hundred years, all with errors and accretions. Once again, this self-imposed diligence delayed publication and the 28 maps of Ptolemy appeared in 1578, after an interval of almost ten years. It was accepted by scholars as the "last word", literally and metaphorically, in a chapter of geography which was closed for good.

Mercator now turned to the modern maps, as author but no longer engraver: the practicalities of the production of maps and globes had been passed to his sons and grandsons. In 1585 he issued a collection of 51 maps covering France, the Low Countries and Germany. Other maps may have followed in good order had not the misfortunes of life intervened: his wife Barbara died in 1586 and his eldest son Arnold died the following year so that only Rumold and the sons of Arnold were left to carry forward his business. In addition, the time he had available for cartography was reduced by a burst of writing on philosophy and theology: a substantial written work on the Harmonisation (Note: For an (online) exegesis of the Harmonisation see Jonge 1990) of the Gospels as well as commentaries on the epistle of St. Paul and the book of Ezekiel.

In 1589, at the age of 77, Mercator had a new lease of life. He took a new wife, Gertrude Vierlings, the wealthy widow of a former mayor of Duisburg (and at the same time he arranged the marriage of Rumold to her daughter). A second collection of 22 maps was published covering Italy, Greece and the Balkans. This volume has a noteworthy preface for it includes mention of Atlas as a mythical king of Mauretania. "I have set this man Atlas," explained Mercator, "so notable for his erudition, humaneness, and wisdom as a model for my imitation." A year later, Mercator had a stroke which left him greatly incapacitated. He struggled with the assistance of his family trying to complete the remaining maps, the ongoing theological publications and a new treatise on the Creation of the World. This last work, which he did succeed in finishing, was the climax of his life's activities, the work which, in his own opinion, surpassed all his other endeavours and provided a framework and rationale for the complete atlas. It was also his last work in a literal sense, for he died after two further strokes in 1594.

=== Epitaph and legacy ===
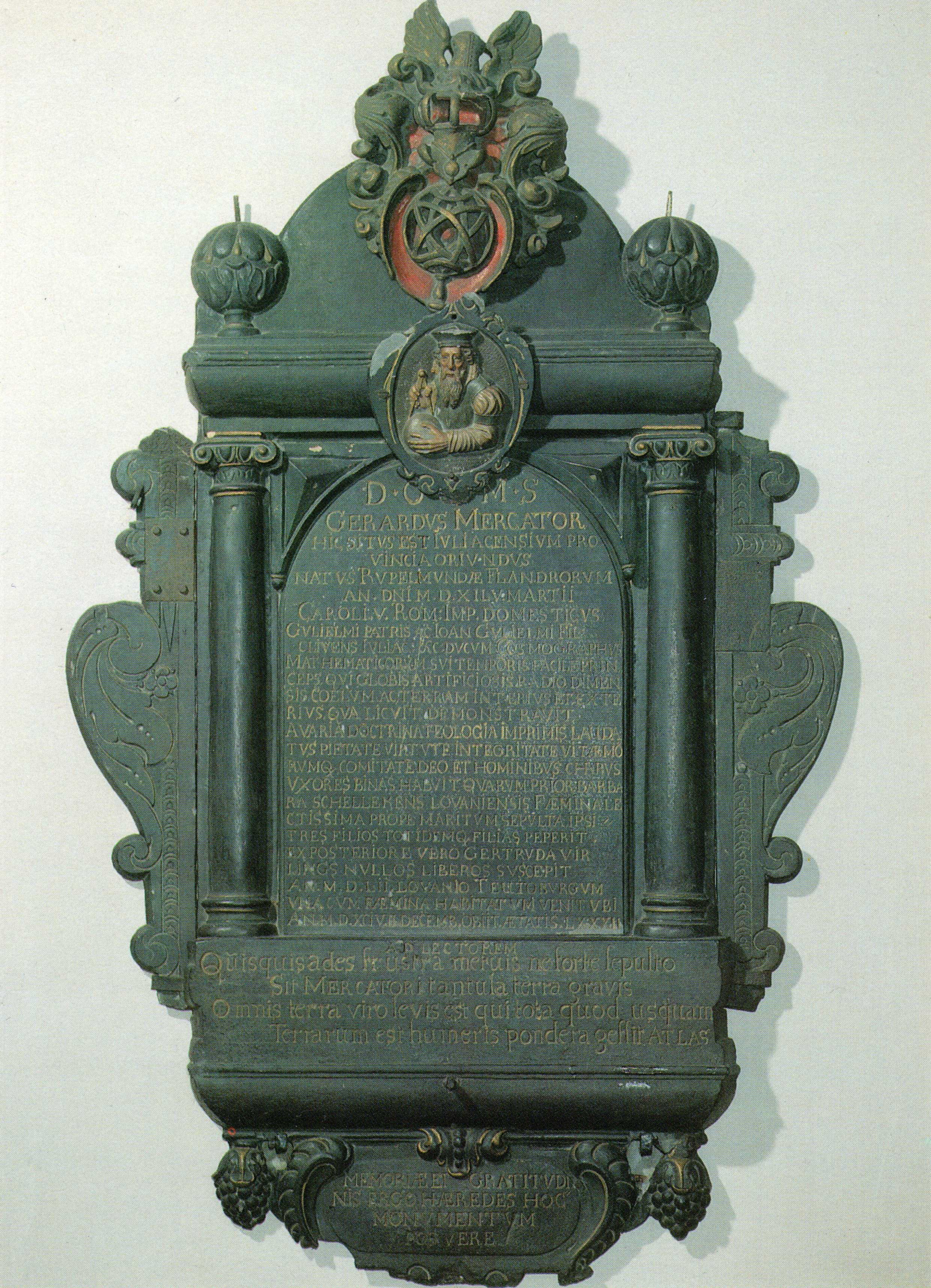
Mercator epitaph in the church of St Salvator, Duisburg, Germany

Mercator was buried in the church of St. Salvatore in Duisburg, where a memorial was erected about fifty years after his death. The main text of the epitaph is a summary of his life lauding him as "the foremost mathematician of his time who crafted artistic and accurate globes showing the heaven from the inside and the Earth from the outside ... greatly respected for his wide erudition, particularly in theology, and famous on account of his piety and respectability in life." In addition, on the base of the memorial, there is an epigram: (Note: The text of Mercator's memorial is given in Van Raemdonck 1868, p. 227 and a translation may be found at Wikisource.)

To the reader: whoever you are, your fears that this small clod of earth lies heavily on the buried Mercator are groundless; the whole Earth is no burden for a man who had the whole weight of her lands on his shoulders and carried her as an Atlas.

Following Mercator's death, his family prepared the Atlas for publication in four months. They hoped for it to become a source of the income that was needed to support them. This work entailed supplementing the maps of 1585 and 1589 with 28 unpublished maps of Mercator covering the northern countries, creating four maps of the continents and a world map, the printing of Mercator's account of the creation and finally the addition of eulogies and Walter Ghim's biography of Mercator. The title itself provides Mercator's definition of a new meaning for the word "Atlas": Atlas Sive Cosmographicae Meditationes de Fabrica Mundi et Fabricati Figura which may be translated as "Atlas or cosmographical meditations upon the fabric of the world and the figure of the fabrick'd, or, more colloquially, as Atlas or cosmographical meditations upon the creation of the universe, and the universe as created." (Note: See Karrow (2000) for a discussion of concept of the term atlas.) Over the years Mercator's definition of atlas has become simply A collection of maps in a volume. (Note: Wiktionary definition of atlas)

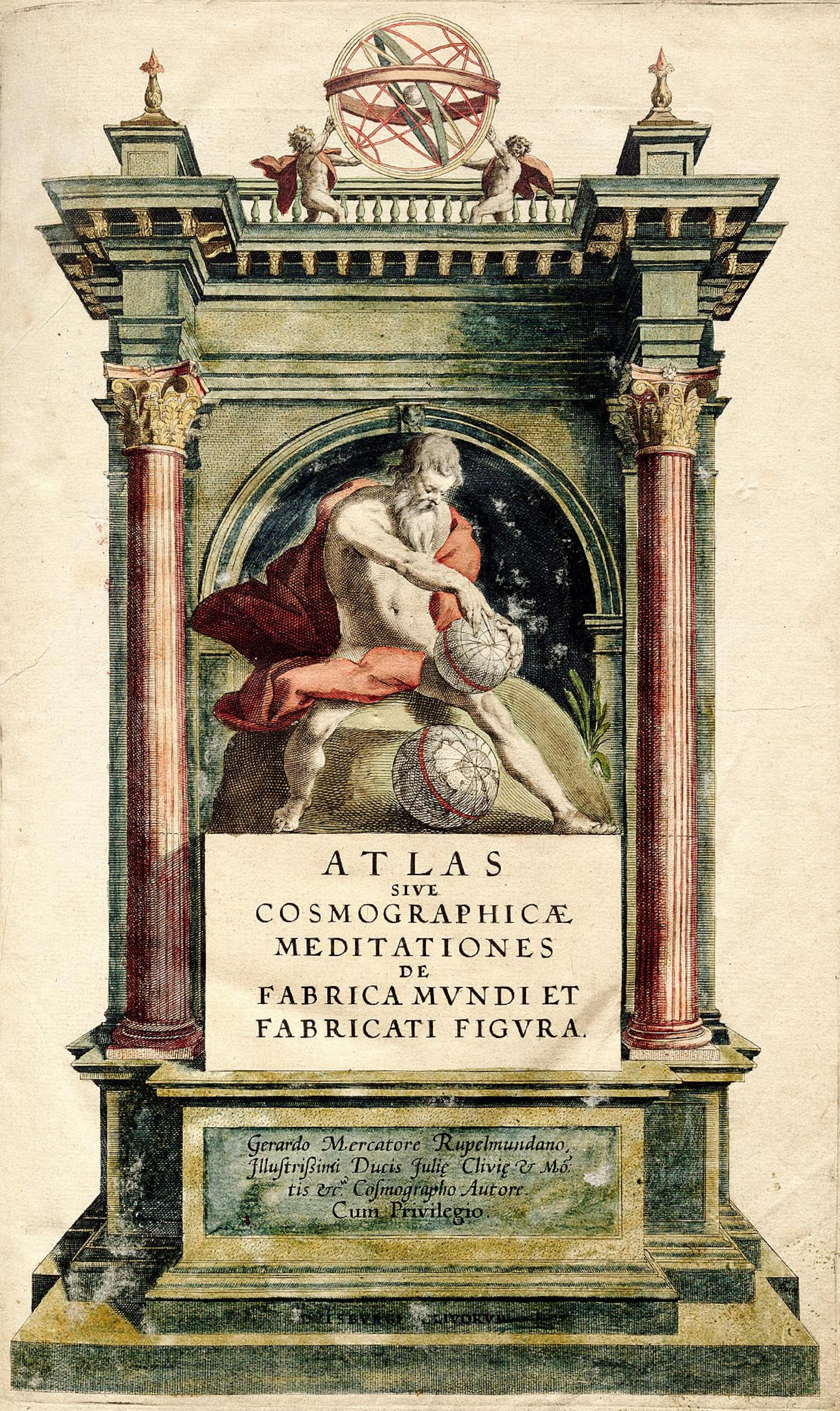
Mercator Atlas title page

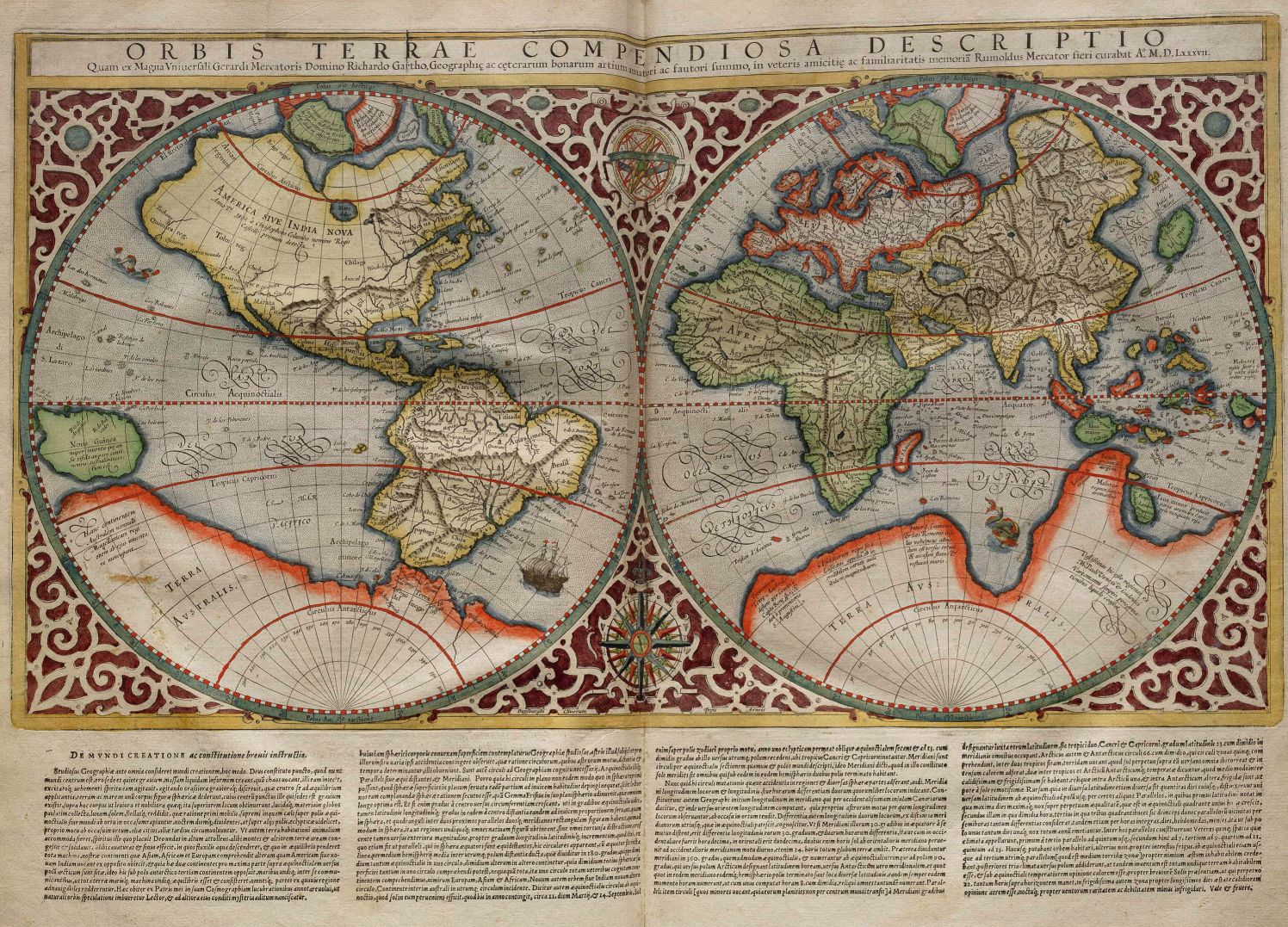
The world map of Rumold Mercator

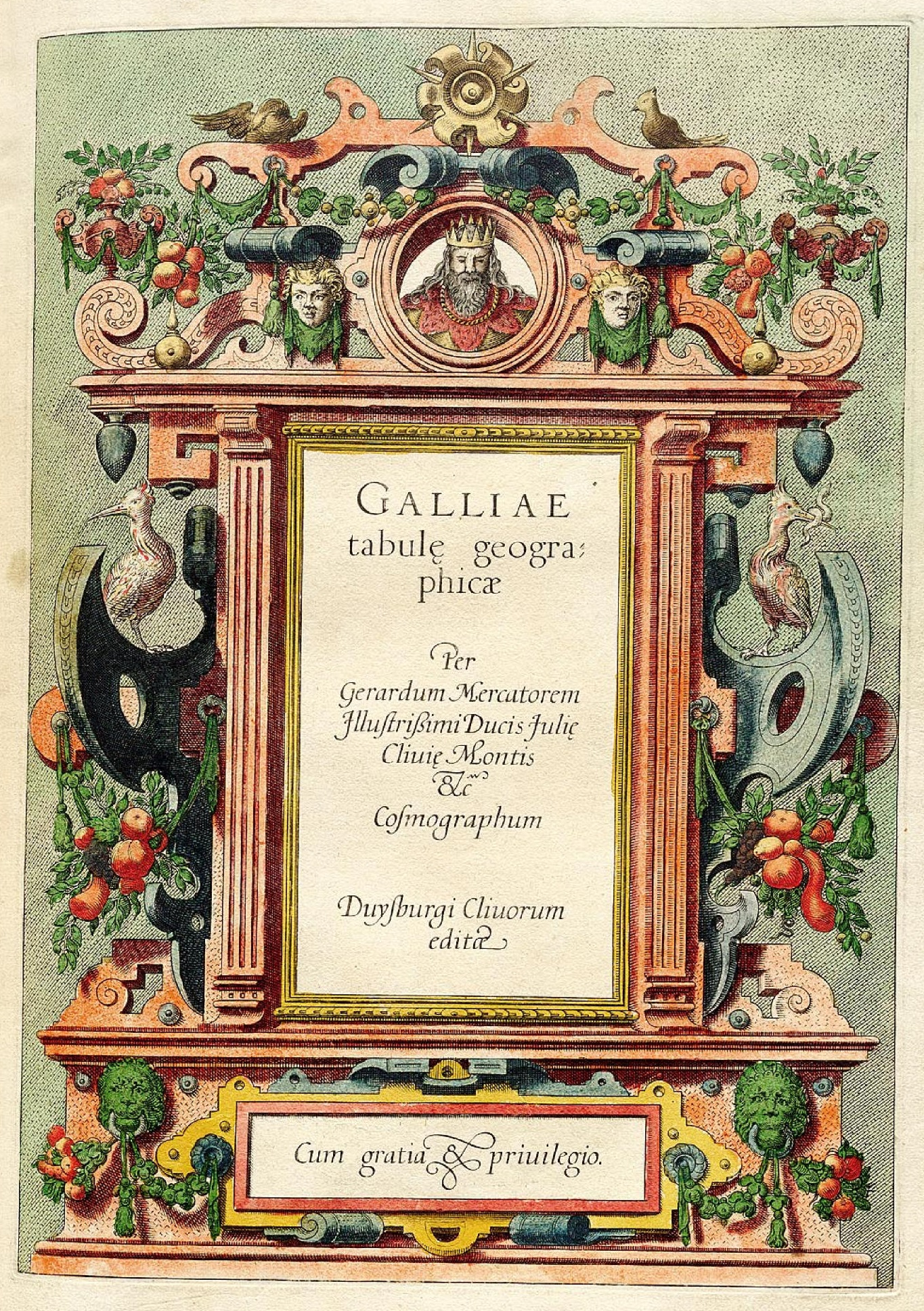
The title page for the maps of Gaul

The atlas was not an immediate success. One reason may have been that it was incomplete: Spain was omitted and there were no detailed maps outside Europe. Rumold avowed that a second volume would attend to these deficiencies, but it was not forthcoming and the whole project lost momentum; Rumold, who was 55 years old in 1595, was in decline and died in 1599. His family did produce another edition in 1602, but only the text was reset; there were no new maps. Another reason for the failure of the Atlas was the strength of the continuing sales of the Theatrum Orbis Terrarum by Abraham Ortelius. Alongside the sumptuous maps of that book Mercator's un-ornamented new maps looked very unattractive. Despite the death of Ortelius in 1598, the Theatrum flourished: in 1602 it was in its thirteenth Latin edition as well as editions in Dutch, Italian, French, German and Spanish. The Mercator atlas seemed destined for oblivion.

The family was clearly in some financial difficulty for in 1604, Mercator's library of some 1,000 books was sold at a public auction in Leiden (Netherlands). The only known copy of the sale catalogue perished in the Second World War, but fortunately a manuscript copy had been made by Van Raemdonck in 1891 and this was rediscovered in 1987. Of the titles identified, there are 193 on theology (both Catholic and Lutheran), 217 on history and geography, 202 on mathematics (in its widest sense), 32 on medicine and over 100 simply classified (by Thomas Basson) as rare books. The contents of the library provide an insight into Mercator's intellectual studies but the mathematics books are the only ones to have been subjected to scholarly analysis: they cover arithmetic, geometry, trigonometry, surveying, architecture, fortification, astronomy, astrology, time measurement, calendar calculation, scientific instruments, cartography and applications. Only one of his own copies has been found—a first edition of Copernicus's De revolutionibus orbium coelestium annotated in Mercator's hand: this is held by Glasgow University.

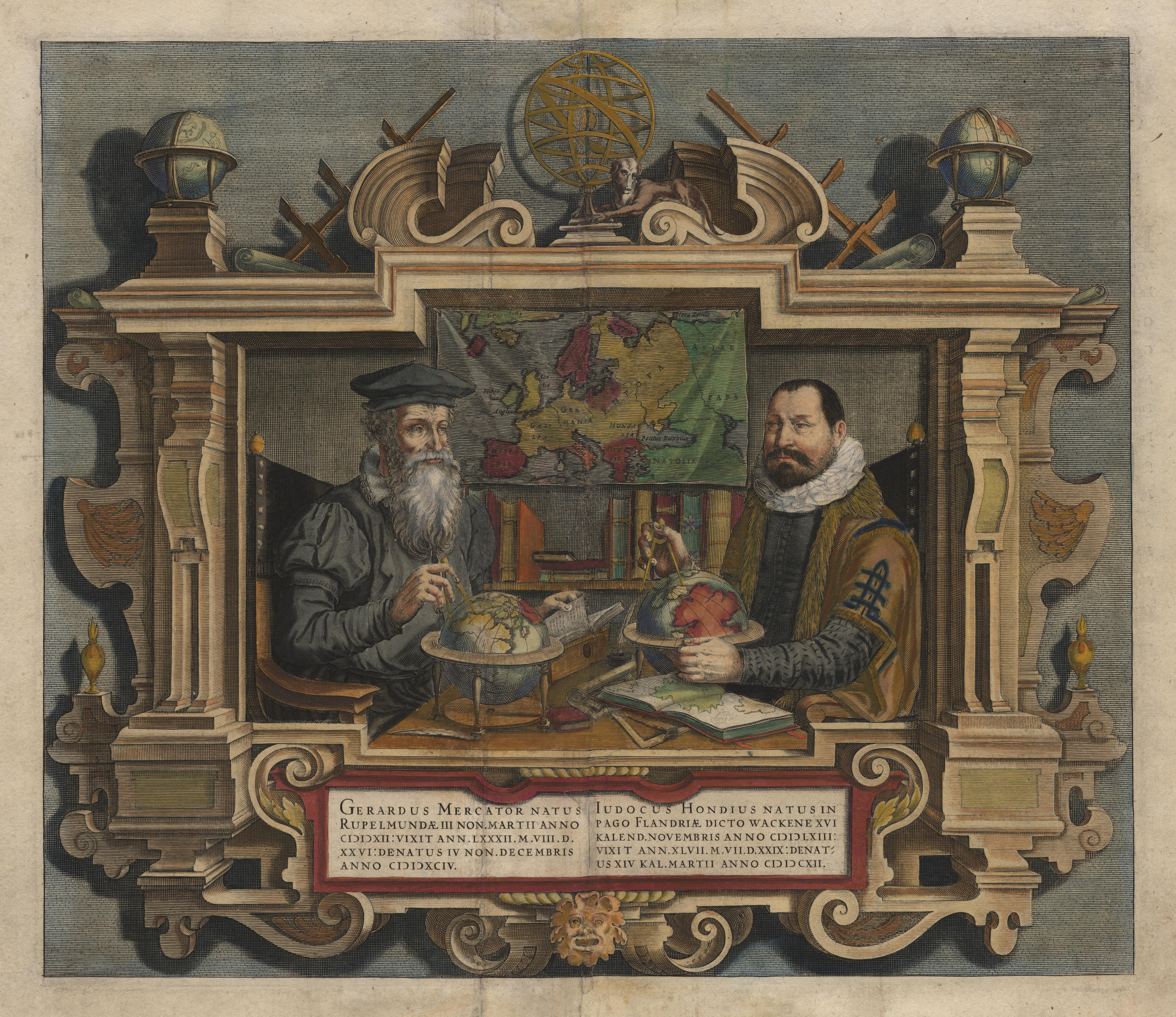
The Hondius-Mercator atlas

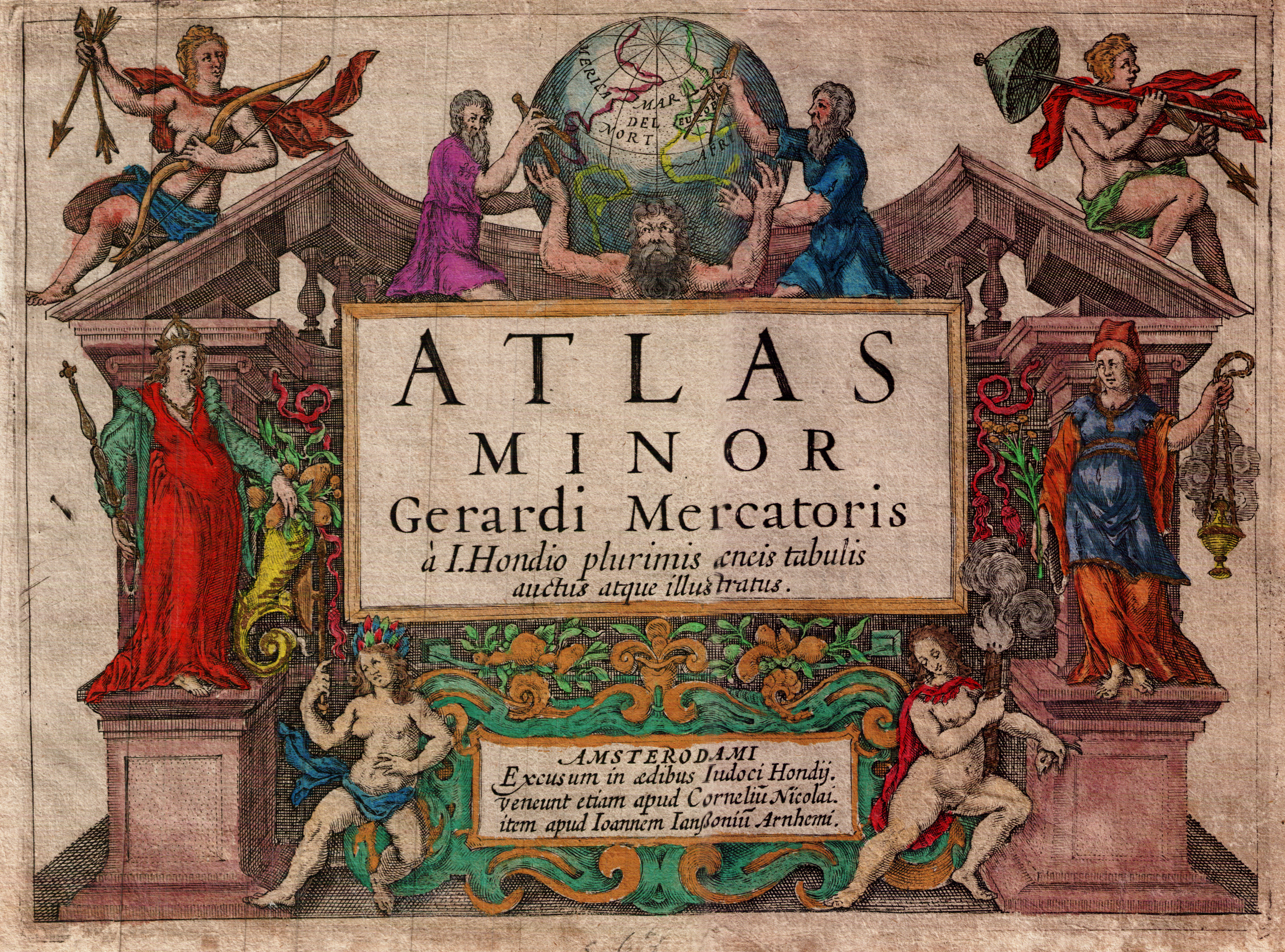
The Atlas Minor of Hondius

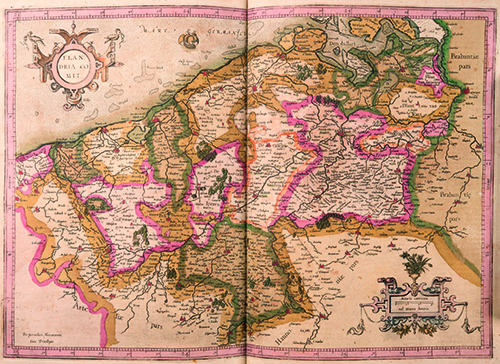
Gerard Mercator & Jodocus Hondius, L'atlas ou meditations cosmographiques de la fabrique du monde, 1610, The Phoebus Foundation

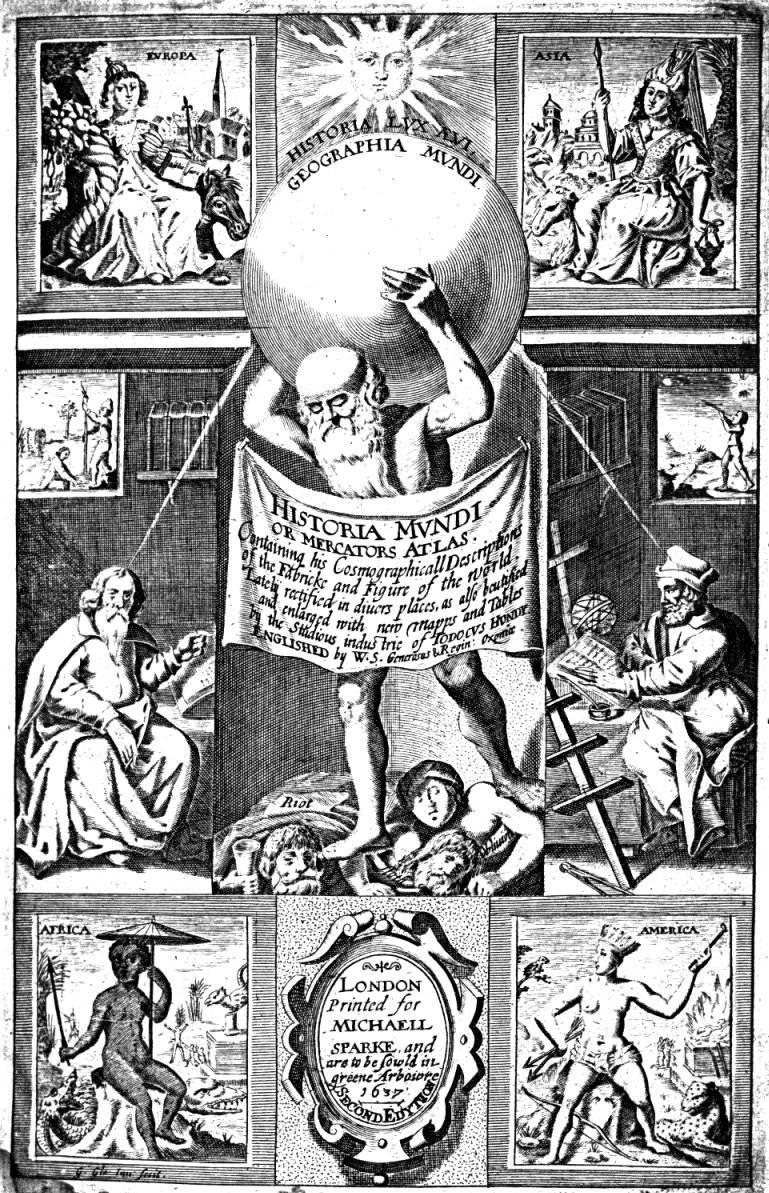
Title page of Mercator-Hondius atlas of 1637 (in English) showing Titan Atlas, Mercator (twice) and personifications of the continents

The sale catalogue doesn't mention any maps, but it is known that the family sold the copper plates to Jodocus Hondius in 1604. He transformed the atlas. Almost 40 extra maps were added (including Spain and Portugal) and in 1606 a new edition appeared under his name but with full acknowledgement that most maps were created by Mercator. The title page now included a picture of Hondius and Mercator together, although they had never met. Hondius was an accomplished business man and under his guidance the Atlas was an enormous success; he (followed by his son Henricus, and son-in-law Johannes Janssonius) produced 29 editions between 1609 and 1641, including one in English. In addition, they published the atlas in a compact form, the Atlas Minor, (Note: The Atlas Minor may be viewed online at the Bavarian State Library) which meant that it was readily available to a wide market. As the editions progressed, Mercator's theological comments and his map commentaries disappeared from the atlas and images of King Atlas were replaced by the Titan Atlas. By the final edition, the number of his maps in the atlas declined to less than 50 as updated new maps were added. Eventually, the atlas became out-of-date and by the middle of the seventeenth century, the publications of map-makers such as Joan Blaeu and Frederik de Wit took over.

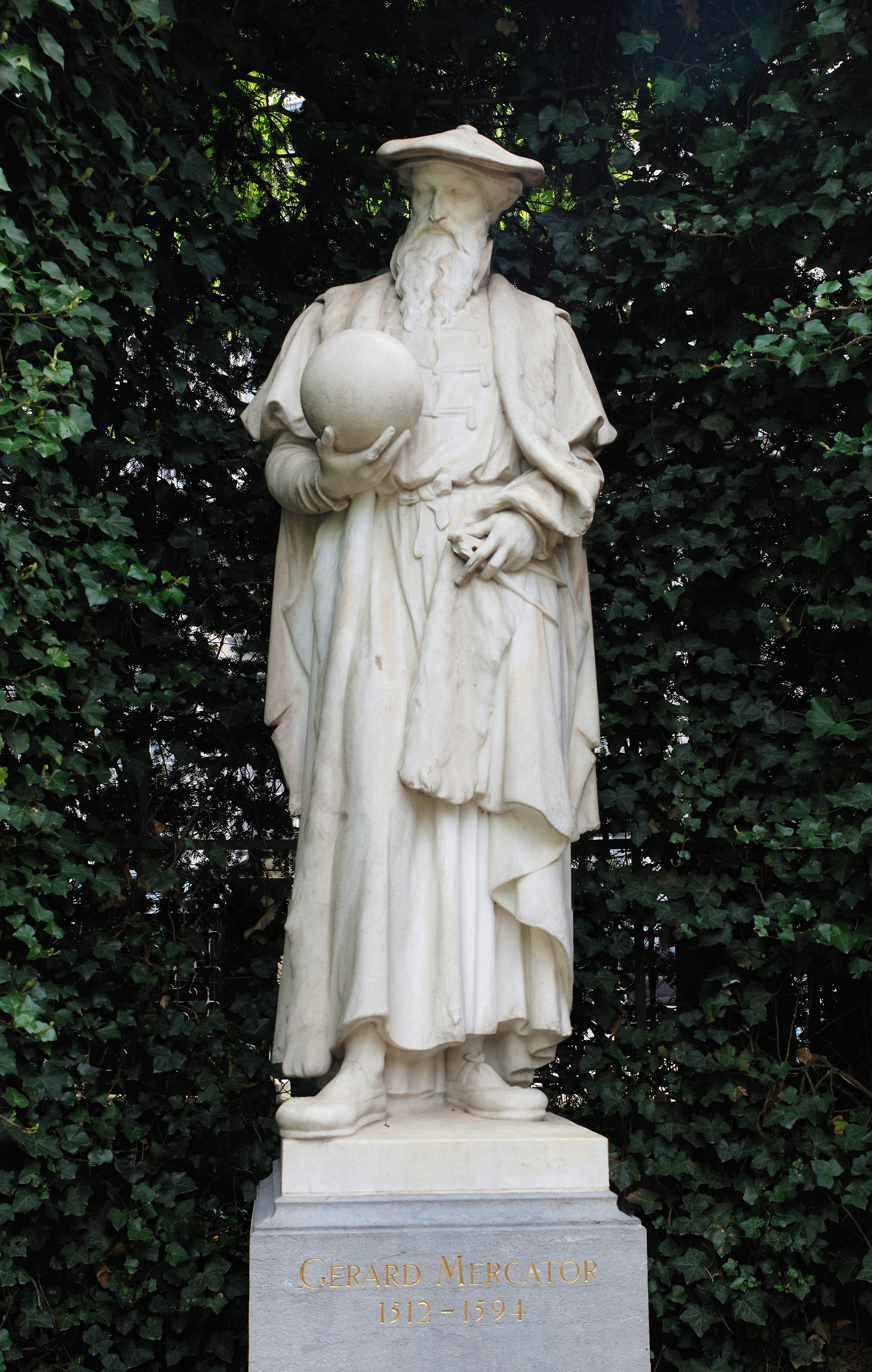
Statue of Mercator, Jardin du Petit Sablon, Brussels

Mercator's editions of Ptolemy and his theological writings were in print for many years after the demise of the atlas, but they too eventually disappeared and it was the Mercator projection which emerged as his sole and greatest legacy. His construction of a chart on which the courses of constant bearing favoured by mariners appeared as straight lines ultimately revolutionised the art of navigation, making it simpler and therefore safer. Mercator left no hints to his method of construction and it was Edward Wright who first clarified the method in his book Certaine Errors (1599)—the relevant error being the erroneous belief that straight lines on conventional charts corresponded to constant courses. Wright's solution was a numerical approximation and it was another 70 years before the projection formula was derived analytically. Wright published a new world map based on the Mercator projection, also in 1599. Slowly, but steadily, charts using the projection appeared throughout the first half of the seventeenth century and by the end of that century chart makers all over the world were using nothing but the Mercator projection, with the aim of showing the oceans and the coastlines in detail without concern for the continental interiors. At some stage the projection made the unfortunate leap to portrayal of the continents and it eventually became the canonical description of the world, despite its manifest distortions at high latitudes. (Note: The distortions of Mercator's map are discussed in the article on the Mercator projection.) Recently, Mercator's projection has been rejected for representations of the world, (Note: See the critique of the Mercator and other projections in Gall–Peters projection) but it remains paramount for nautical charts and its use stands as his enduring legacy.

Many cities have a statue of Mercator. (Note: Statues in Rupelmonde, Duisburg, Brussels, Louvain.) His name has been attached to ships, (Note: The Mercator was a training vessel for the Belgian navy. It now serves as a museum in Ostend. There is also a German research ship Mercator) buildings, universities, (Note: The university of Duisburg was known as the Gerhard Mercator University until it merged to become the University of Duisburg-Essen, part of which is the Mercator School of Management) insurance companies, small businesses, pizzerias, streets, schools and more. There is a Belgian bank note. There is a German coin and an incorrect postage stamp (showing a construction which is not the Mercator Projection). (Note: The German coin and the incorrect postage stamp (showing an incorrect construction for the Mercator Projection.) He has been modelled in sand and giant figures. (Note: Modelled in sand and giant figure.) There is a venomous snail and a beetle. (Note: Venomous snail and a beetle.) An asteroid is named for him.

There are two museums dedicated primarily to Mercator:

- Kultur- und Stadthistorisches Museum in Duisburg, Germany. (Note: http://www.stadtmuseum-duisburg.de/)
- Mercator Museum (Stedelijke musea) in Sint-Niklaas, Belgium. (Note: https://mapsint-niklaas.be/)

== Works ==
=== Globes and instruments ===
The globes by Gemma Frisius and Mercator are discussed in Volume 3 of the History of Cartography (Cartography in the European Renaissance). Chapter 6: "Globes in Renaissance Europe" by Elly Dekker. Chapter 44: "Commercial Cartography and Map Production in the Low Countries, 1500–ca. 1672" by Cornelis Koeman, Günter Schilder, Marco van Egmond, and Peter van der Krogt. The definitive work is "Globi neerlandici: the production of globes in the Low Countries" by Peter van der Krogt.

- 1536 Gemma Frisius terrestrial globe.

Wholly devised by Frisius who invited Mercator to engrave the text. The only extant example is part of the Schmidt collection held by the Globe Museum (website) of the Austrian National Library. Another example held at the Gymnasium Francisceum of Zerbst in eastern Germany was destroyed in the Second World War, but there is a full description in Stevenson.

- 1537 Gemma Frisius celestial globe. Image

The only known example is held by the Royal Museums Greenwich (formerly the National Maritime Museum). On this globe Mercator's name appears on equal footing with that of Frisius. The globe is also described in Stevenson.

- 1541/1551 Terrestrial and celestial globes

Over twenty pairs of large (420mm) globes are still in existence. Both of the globes and their un-pasted gores may be examined in high resolution. (Note: The terrestrial and celestial globes may be examined in high resolution at the Harvard Map Collection Archived 17 August 2012 at the Wayback Machine) (Note: The gores for both Mercator globes held by the Bibliothèque Royale (Brussels) have been published in facsimile with a preface by Antoine de Smet ((Mercator & Smet 1968). High resolution images are available at the National Library of Australia (click on Browse).) A full description of the globes may be found online in Stevenson.
The terrestrial globe is significant in conjecturing that North America is separated from Asia, unlike the globe of Monachus. Another feature, the shape Mercator ascribed to Beach and Maletur, later gave rise to speculation that the north coast of Australia had been visited in the early sixteenth century. An inscription on the globe promises: "Where and for what reasons we have departed from the editions of others, Oh Reader, will be pointed out in our booklet". (Note: Vbi et quibus argumentis, Lector, ab aliorum desciverimus aeditione libellus noster indicabit.)
Mercator also added a feature of special value to seamen: from the numerous compass or wind roses he drew rhumb lines rather than great circles. The rhumb lines correspond to constant sailing directions but on the spherical globe they appear as spirals. The globe was manufactured in great numbers but it was never updated. The celestial globe was up to date in using the information provided by Copernicus.

=== Maps ===
Mercator created and published many maps in his lifetime.

The Mercator 1537 Holy Land map was dedicated to Franciscus van Cranevelt. Partly based on a map by the Lutheran scholar Jacob Ziegler, Mercator's map shows the route of the Israelites from Egypt to the Promised Land and appears to be intended to help people understand stories in the Bible.

Two copies of the Mercator 1538 world map, known as Orbis Imago, remain. It is a double cordiform projection and the first map identifying North America and South America. The map was a slightly modified copy of a 1531 world map (and its text) by Oronce Fine.

The Mercator 1540 Flanders map (Flandria) was commissioned by merchants of Ghent who intended that it should be presented to an angry Charles V as a respectful replacement of a 1538 map by Pieter Van der Beke which had stressed the defiant independence of the Flemish cities. The map is remarkably accurate and it is presumed to be based on a triangulation of Flanders by Jacob van Deventer.

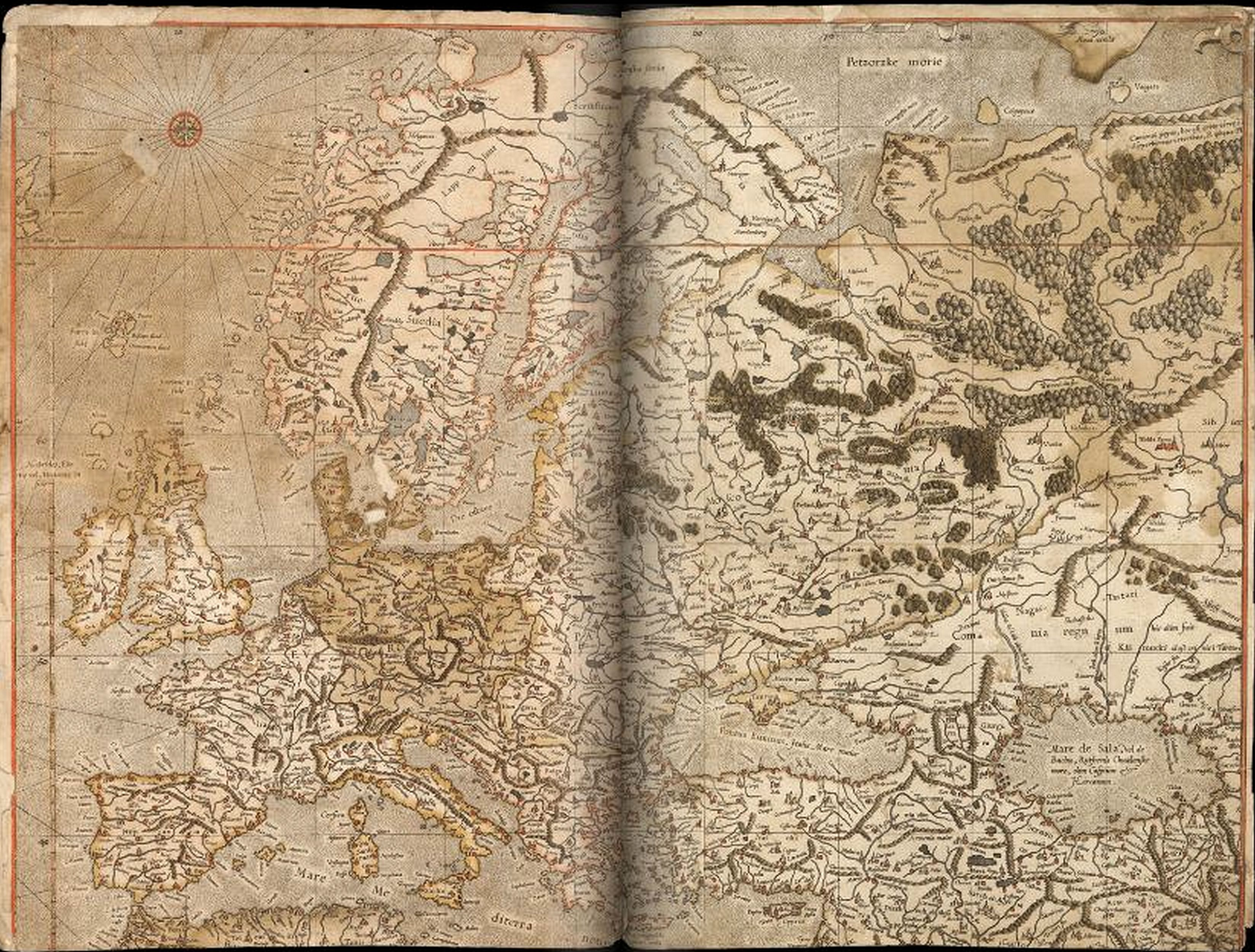
Mercator 1554 map of Europe

The Mercator 1554 map of Europe (Europae descriptio) was a cordiform projection that Mercator later cut and re-assembled for inclusion in his unique Atlas of Europe of 1570–72.

The Mercator 1564 British Isles map (Anglia & Scotiae & Hibernie nova descriptio) was a significant improvement in accuracy. Several copies of this map were cut and re-assembled for the atlas of Europe.

The Mercator 1564 Lorraine map (Lotharingia) was commissioned by Duke René of Lorraine, but never published.

Mercator 1569 world map.

What is now called his 1570–1572 Atlas of Europe was unique collection of maps assembled in the early 1570s, many of which are assembled from portions of Mercator's earlier maps and maps from the Theatrum Orbis Terrarum of Abraham Ortelius. Mercator himself did not term this collection of maps an atlas.

Mercator 1578 Ptolemy's Geographia were Mercator's version of Ptolemy's maps. A second edition including the revised text of Geographia was published in 1584.

The Mercator 1585 Atlas (Galliae, Belgii Inferioris, Germaniae) was the first collection of 51 modern maps of France (with Switzerland), Belgium, the Netherlands, and Germany. The three sections, each with a title page, dedication and supporting text, were sold together and separately.

The Mercator 1589 Atlas (Italiae, Sclavoniae, Grecia). A second collection of 23 modern maps of Italy (including Corsica), Styria and the other Balkan countries, and Greece. Although Mercator did not term this collection of maps an atlas, he introduces Atlas as a mythical King of Mauretania—a learned philosopher, mathematician and astronomer, credited with the making of the first globe—in the preface.

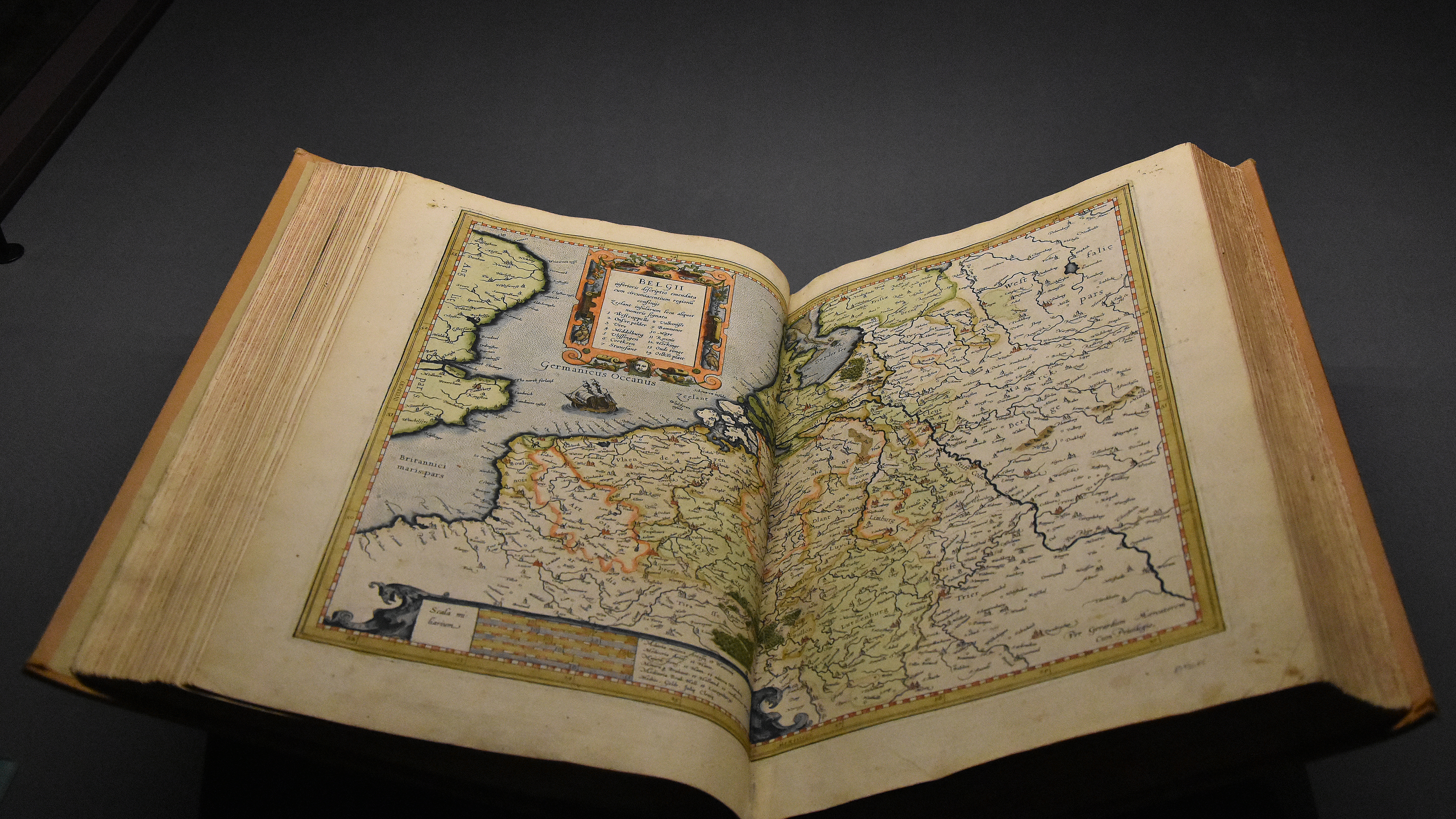
The 1595 atlas in the collection of the Royal Library of Belgium

The Mercator 1595 Atlas was published posthumously by his son, Rumold Mercator. It was the first time that the name Atlas was used as a title of a collection of maps. The atlas includes further 28 maps: 16 of Britain, 4 of Denmark and one each of the polar regions, Iceland, Norway with Sweden, Prussia, Livonia, Russia, Lithuania, Transylvania and Crimea. The full atlas included all the maps of the previous two collections, making in all 102 new maps by Mercator. His heirs added 5 introductory maps before publication: world map and Europe by Rumold, Africa and Asia by grandson Gerard and America by grandson Michael. Nevertheless the atlas was incomplete: Spain was omitted and there were no detailed maps outside Europe. The maps are in a variety of projections. (Note: Projections used in the 1585 atlas: see Keuning 1947) Less than half the pages in the atlas are maps.

=== Books ===
- Mercator, Gerardus (1540), Literarum latinarum, quas italicas, cursorias que vocant, scribendarum ratio (How to write the Latin letters which they call italic or cursive), Antwerp, OCLC 63443530 Available online at the Library of Congress and Das Münchener Digitalisierungszentrum. It may be downloaded as a pdf from the latter. This book is the subject of a monograph which includes a translation of the text (Osley 1969).
- Mercator, Gerardus (1554), Declaratio insigniorum utilitatum quae sunt in globo terrestri : coelesti, et annulo astronomico ad invictissimum romanum imperatorem Carolum Quintum. (A description of the most important applications of the terrestrial and celestial globes and the astronomical ring. For the most invincible Roman Emperor Charles V.), Duisburg. Reprinted in 1868 with a commentary by Jean van Raemdonck. (OCLC 459842538). For the Latin text and a German translation see Krücken (1996). A rough (partial) translation is on wikiquote
- Mercator, Gerardus (1569), Chronologia, Hoc Est Temporvm Demonstratio Exactissima, Ab Initio Mvndi, Vsqve Ad Annvm Domini M.D.LXVIII. Ex Eclipsibvs Et Observationibvs Astronomicis omnium temporum concinnata. (A chronology, a very accurate of recorded time from the beginning of the world until AD1568. Elaborated from astronomical observations of eclipses for all times.), Duisburg: Arnoldi Birkmanni, OCLC 165787166. There are PDF downloads, at the Bayerische Bibliothek (title page) and also the HathiTrust (catalogue and title page).
- Mercator, Gerardus (1592), Evangelicae historiae quadripartita monas sive harmonia quatuor Evangelistarum. (Harmonization of the Gospels.) Many other copies listed at World Cat.

== Frans Hogenberg portrait text ==
Frans Hogenberg was a close friend of Mercator. His portrait features prominently at the beginning of the Atlas. The text around the portrait is

Magna Pelusiacis debetur gratia chartis// Magna tibi priscum tandem superasse laborem// Mercator, tractusque novos, terraeque, marisque// Monstrasse, et magnum quod continent omnia caelum. I. Vivian. ludeb (Great thanks are owed to the Ptolemaic charts, and great thanks to you, Mercator, for having at last surpassed that ancient labour, and for having shown new stretches of the earth and sea, and the great, all-containing heavens. By J. Vivian)

The text below the image reads is
GERARDI MERCATORIS RUPELMUNDANI EFFIGIEM ANNOR. / DUORUM ET SEX – AGINTA, SUI ERGA IPSUM STV DII / CAUSA DEPINGI CURABAT FRAC. HOG. M. D. LXXIV (Gerardus Mercator of Rupelmonde at the age of 62—Frans Hogenburg made this portrait out of affection for him. 1574)
For an analysis of the Mercator portrait see Zuber 2011, pp. 524–527

== See also ==
- Pedro Nunes
- Mercator 1569 world map
- Mercator projection
- History of cartography
- Abraham Ortelius
- Jodocus Hondius
- Theatrum Orbis Terrarum (Theatre of the World)
- Early modern Netherlandish cartography
- Golden Age of Netherlandish cartography
