= Cologne Cathedral quarter =

Cologne Cathedral surroundings

Coordinates: 50°56′27″N 6°57′25″E

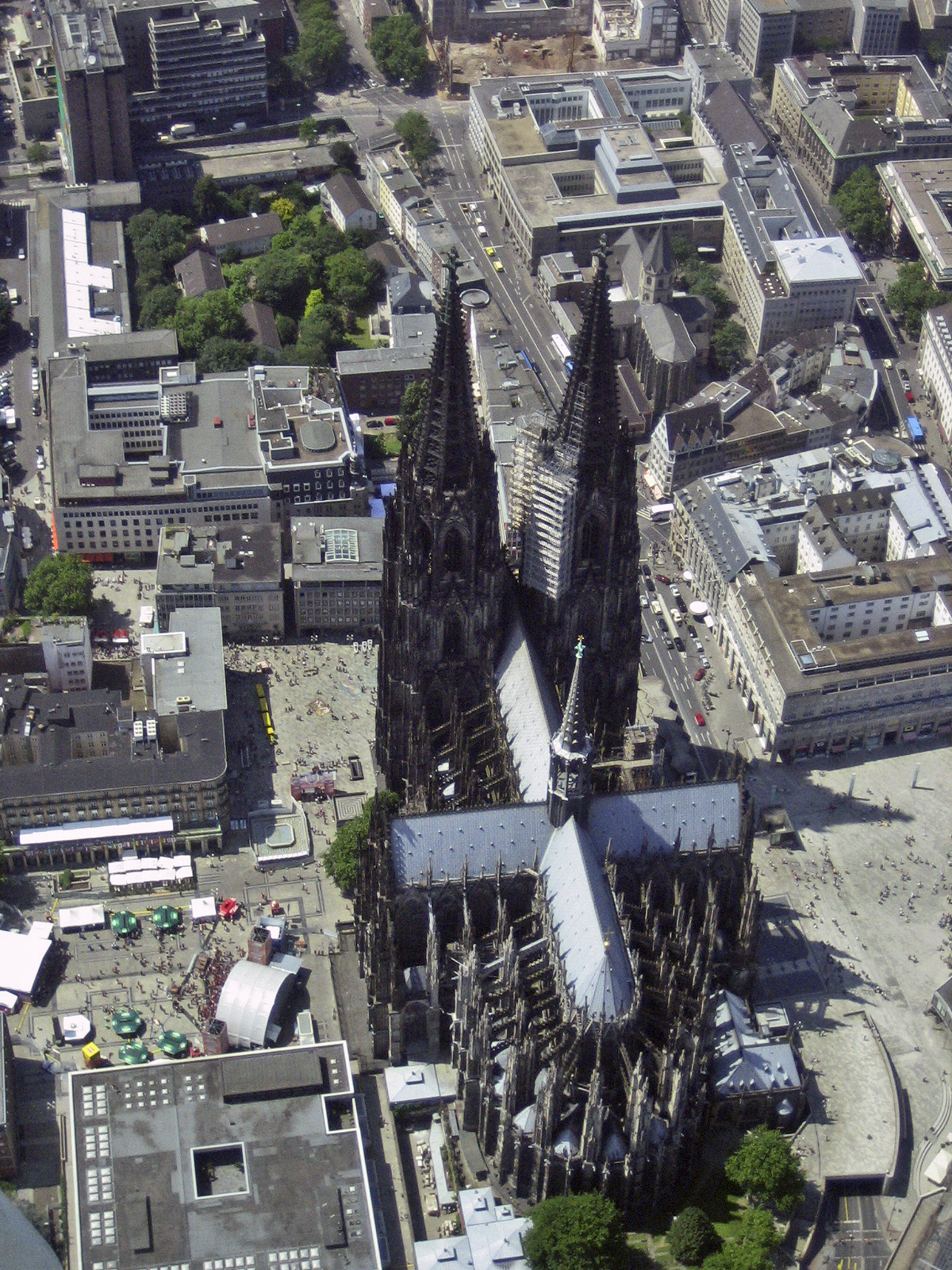
Aerial view of the cathedral surrounded by axially aligned squares

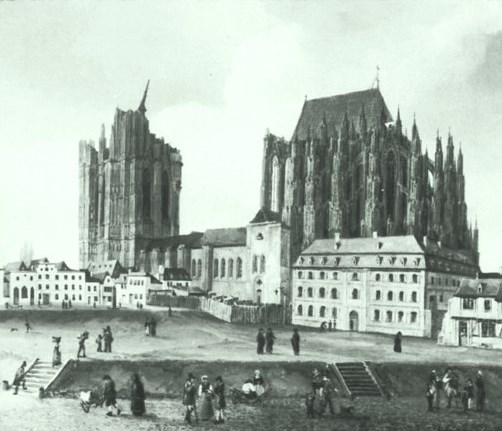
The unfinished cathedral and surroundings in 1829

The Cologne Cathedral quarter (German: Domumgebung) is the area immediately surrounding Cologne Cathedral in Cologne, North Rhine-Westphalia, Germany. When the Gothic cathedral was built, it was closely surrounded by houses and smaller churches. When the cathedral was completed in 1880 as a national symbol, it was freed from adjacent structures and stood isolated, unhampered by traffic. After the inner city was destroyed in World War II, it was rebuilt, with a pedestrian area connecting to the cathedral. In 1970, the Domplatte was constructed as a large concrete surface without steps around the cathedral, which became the location of major open-air events such as Carnival and pop concerts. The design of the cathedral surroundings has remained a challenge for urban planning.

== Building history of the cathedral surroundings ==
=== Cathedral construction in the Middle Ages ===
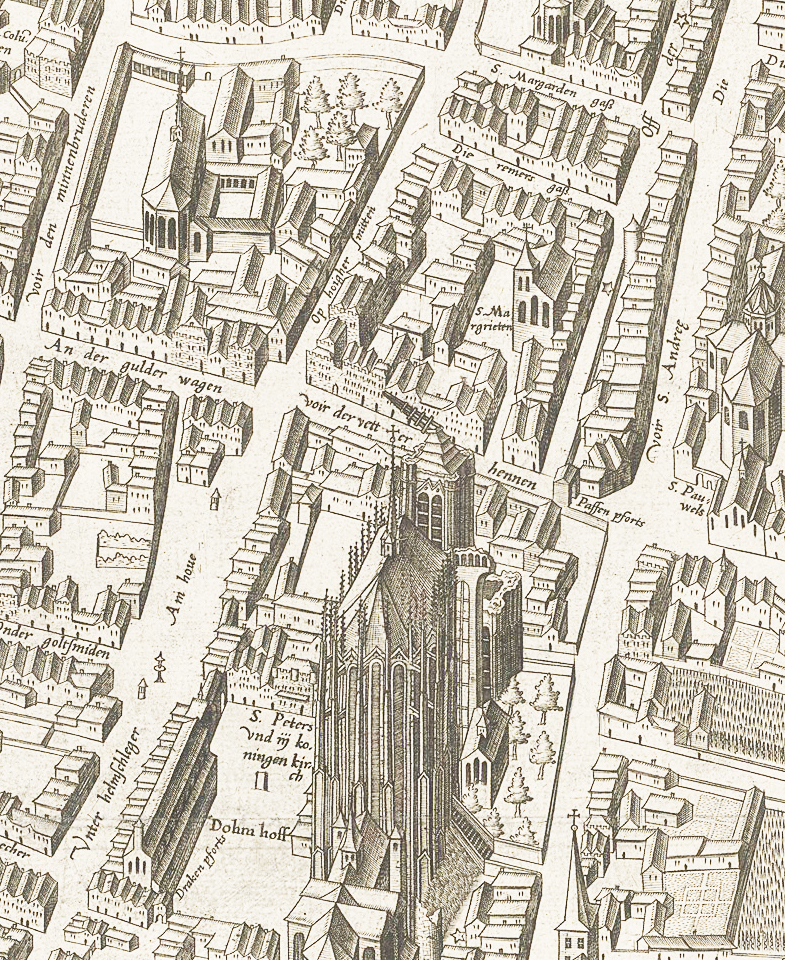
Cathedral and surroundings, by Arnold Mercator, 1571

In medieval Cologne, buildings stood in the immediate vicinity of the cathedral. Contemporary illustrations show that the cathedral was surrounded by the houses of the bishop and the cathedral chapters. Secular buildings included the archbishop's prison "Hacht" from 1165, and the cathedral provostry built in 1363. Later buildings included the Binger houses built in 1596 for the publisher Arnold Kirchhoff by Johann von Winter in the immediate vicinity of the cathedral, attested as early as 1382 as an archbishop's fief of the Erbkämmerer. The Cologne city view of 1570 by Arnold Mercator shows that buildings immediately surrounding the cathedral in all directions.

The cathedral still appeared enclosed by other buildings around 1800. The Cathedral Deanery on its north side was built completed in 1658 for the Franz Egon von Fürstenberg-Heiligenberg, and was demolished in 1892. The open spaces in its immediate vicinity were Frankenplatz, the market place Domhof, and Domkloster. To its west, several large medieval buildings included the Kamp(f)hof (later: Kamperhof), first mentioned in the Schreinsbücher in 1356, and zum Palast, owned by the book printer family Heinrich Quentell since 4 November 1500.

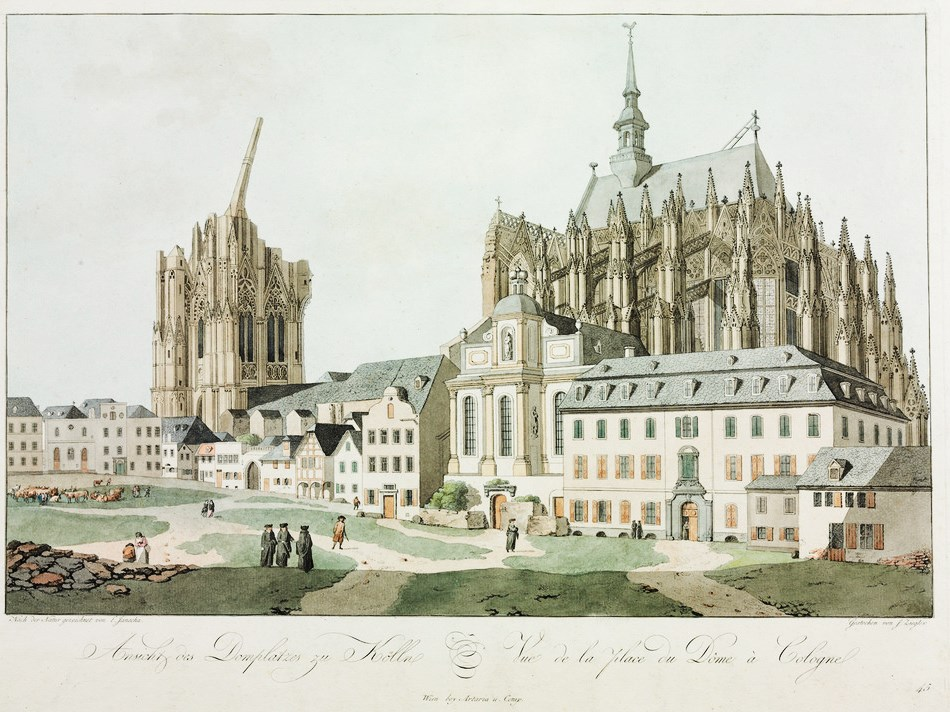
Domhof in 1799

The French administration installed a guillotine in the cathedral courtyard, which they called Place Metropole, on 16 October 1798, where more than 30 people were executed. The secularisation of 1802 led to the expropriation and demolition of the existing sacred buildings.

=== The cathedral as a national monument ===
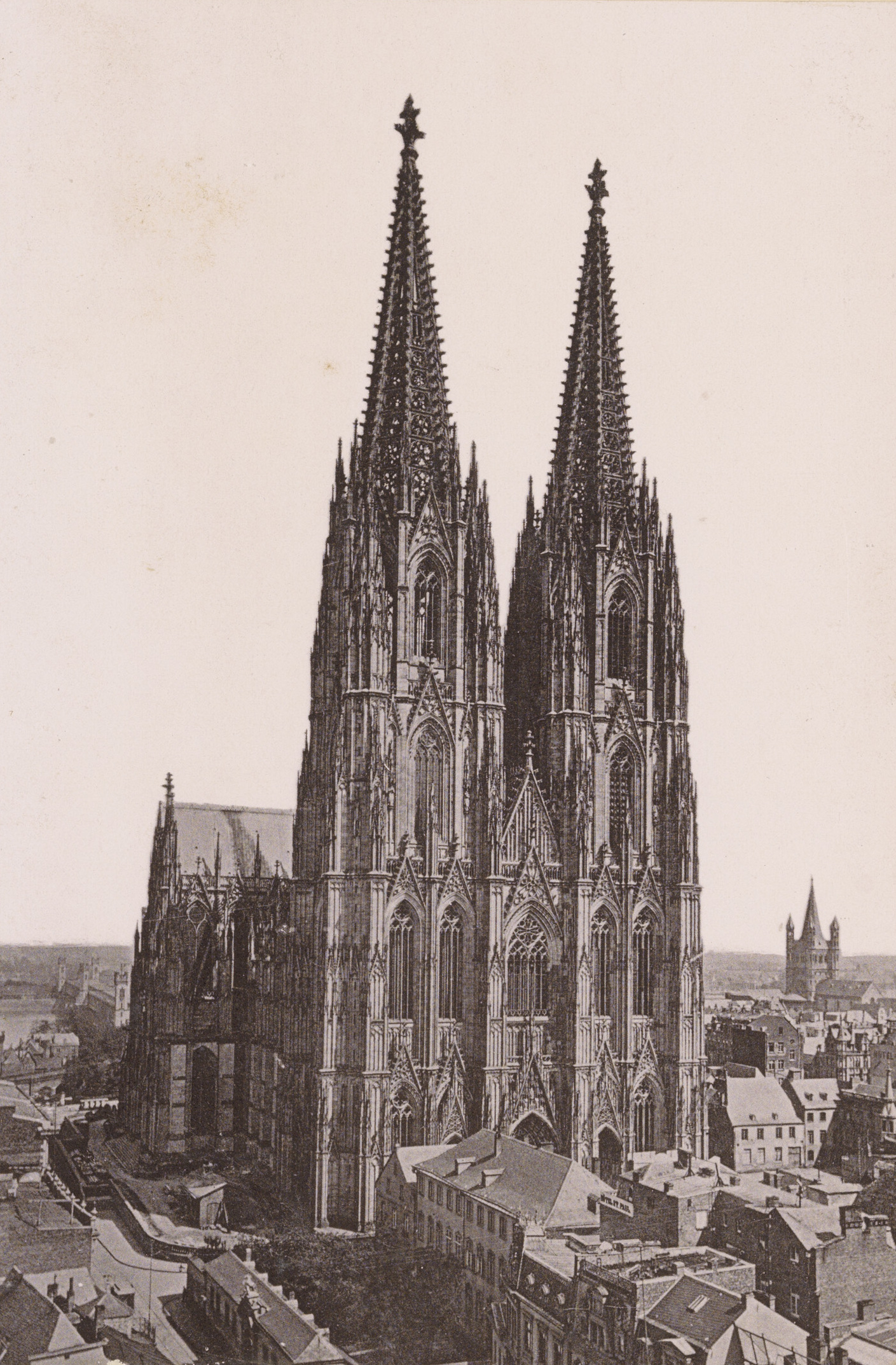
Cathedral and surroundings, 1890

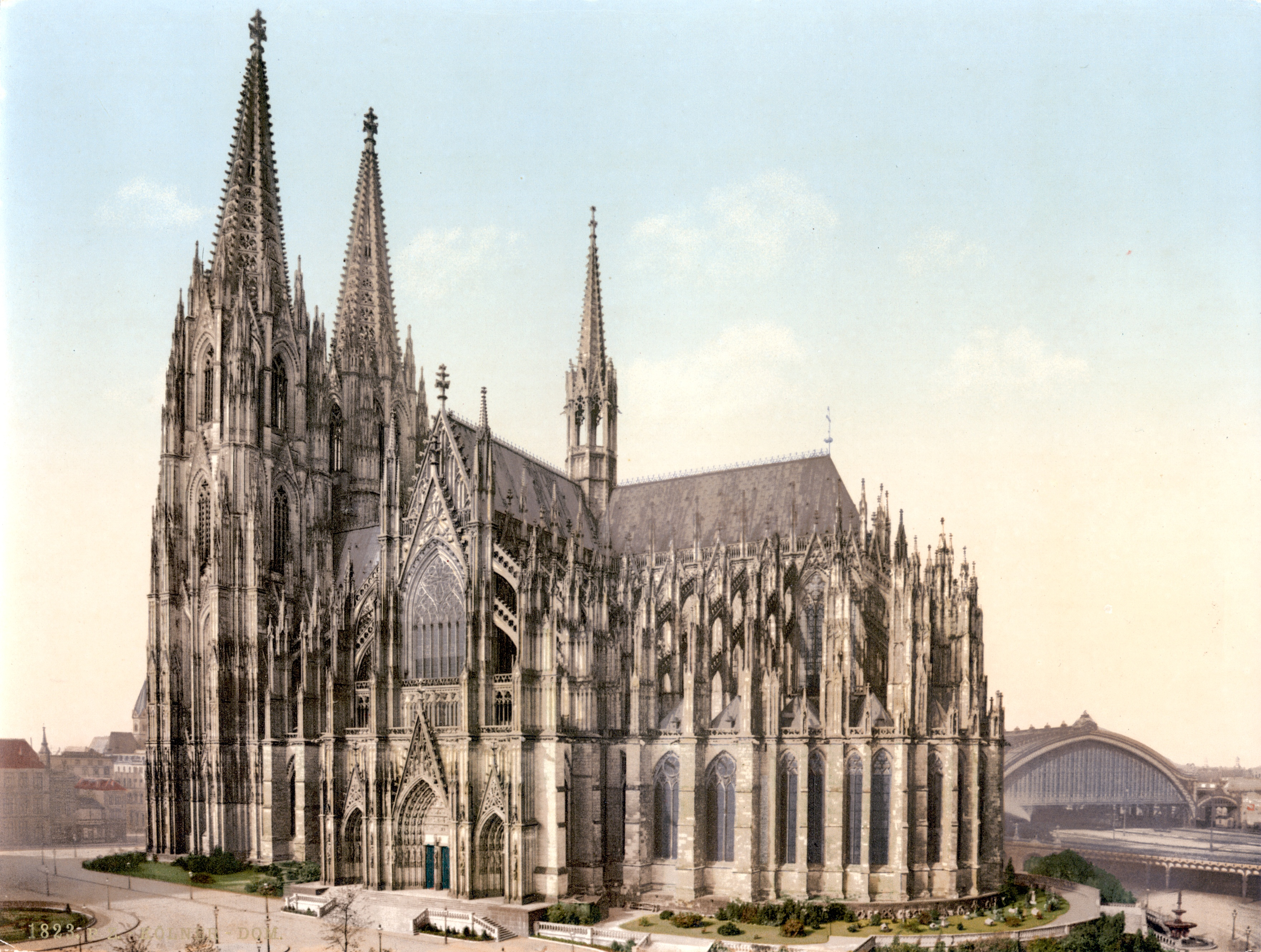
Cathedral and surroundings, ca. 1900

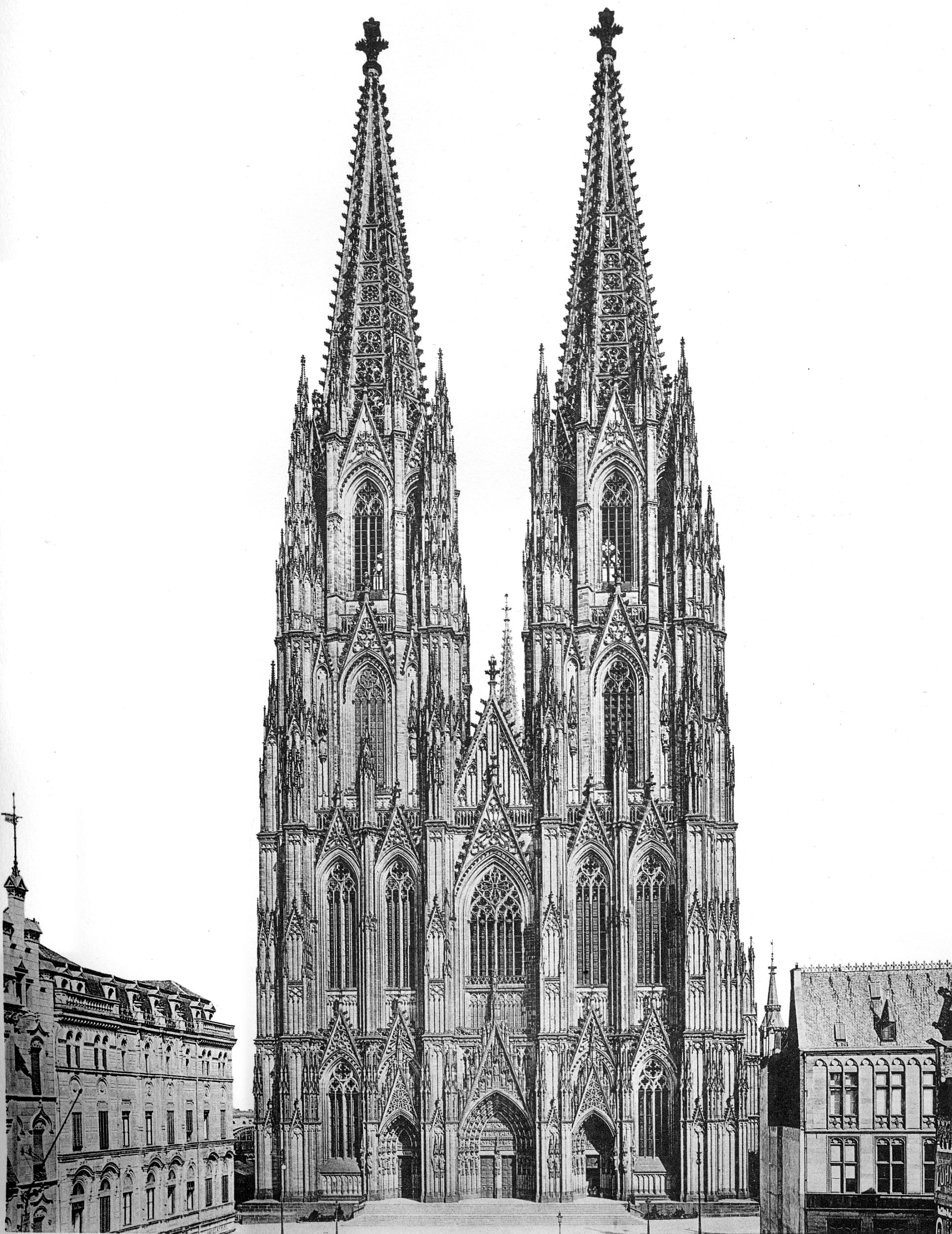
Cathedral and surroundings, 1911

==== Schinkel ====
The first plans to change the surroundings of a cathedral to free space were sketched by Karl Friedrich Schinkel in 1816. He proposed to demolish the old houses around the cathedral and create a ring of green space with terraces down to the Rhine. The difference in height between the cathedral choir and the Frankenplatz, which was lower at the time, was to be compensated by a two-winged staircase, part of an overall garden design which included a fountain, the later Petrusbrunnen.

To follow the plan, the dilapidated provostry was demolished in June 1830, and the Cologne prison Hacht in August 1893, for an unobstructed view of the cathedral. In November 1857, two houses at Domhof were demolished. The Köln-Mindener Eisenbahn-Gesellschaft (Trankgasse No. 8) and the Colonia insurance company (Trankgasse No. 6) donated their buildings to the city in 1863. The desired free exposure of the cathedral was thus achieved in the east, but plans to clear a Kaiserstraße in the west, running axially towards the west facade of the cathedral, could only be realised in a small section..

Another plan for the redesign of the cathedral surroundings from 1 October 1866 was not realised.

==== Stübben ====
In October 1885, city architect Josef Stübben submitted a plan for the free exposure of the cathedral which he presented in the Deutsche Bauzeitung. The collapse of the first Dom-Hotel on 31 December 1885 encouraged a new design of the cathedral surroundings, especially in the west in front of the portals and in the south in front of the south transept. A decisive idea was that the complete cathedral should be visible. The Dom-Hotel was rebuilt at a distance according to the requirements of the Dombauverein (Cathedral building association), and reopened 15 April 1893. Between 1826 and 1893, two churches and 69 houses had to make way for the plans. This marked the end of the extensive demolition work to expose the densely enclosed cathedral. Stübben noted in 1903 that "the exposure of a building ... can arise from the need for traffic or from aesthetic intent".

As early as the Gründerzeit, building near the cathedral was to be avoided, to present the cathedral as a monument enthroned majestically on the Domhügel (cathedral hill). All secular buildings had to keep a respectful distance from Cologne's most important sacred building.

== Transformation in the 20th century ==
=== Construction of the Domplatte ===
The results of an international competition launched in February 1956 to redesign the area around the cathedral were not realised. In May 1964, construction work began on the underground Cologne Stadtbahn, which initiated new concepts of the cathedral surroundings, especially since the tram running close to it would be no longer needed. In order to integrate the cathedral into the urban fabric, Fritz Schaller built the Domplatte from 1968 to 1970, as an elevation of the pedestrian terrain to the level of the cathedral portals, which had been accessible only by stairs. Giving up the idea of a cathedral mound, a concrete platform was built surrounding the entire cathedral, covered with multi-coloured granite paving, with stairs leading to the elevation at a greater distance from the cathedral, both to the traffic office in the west and to the main station in the north.

Below the Domplatte, a two-storey underground car park for 613 cars was built from 1969 to 1971. A new building next to the Domplatte was the Roman-Germanic Museum, which opened on 4 March 1974. In 1980, construction began on the Museum Ludwig, which was opened on 6 September 1986.

=== Urban upgrading and improvement of the quality of stay ===
Competitions brought about a partial renewal of the Domplatte in 1988. In April 2003, the city commissioned Christian Schaller with the redesign of the stairs to the main station, which he designed as a 70 m wide flight of steps, opened on 10 August 2005. In September 2009, the Council of the City of Cologne decided to develop an overall urban development concept for the area around the cathedral, with the aim. to turn the Domplatte into the city's central focal point. The concept was to be realised in four construction phases. In August 2013, the redesign began in the east between the cathedral, the museums and the station. The entire upper level around the Domherrenfriedhof (cathedral cemetery) as well as the street level below between Trankgasse and Kurt-Hackenberg-Platz was redesigned with wide pedestrian ways, an improved lighting concept and spacious straight stair areas and the demolition of part of the Trankgasse tunnel. In November 2019, the second phase began for the north. Here, too, the cathedral base is to be made visible again through uniform cladding with natural stone and pedestrian friendliness is to be increased.

== Squares around the cathedral ==
Four large squares surround the cathedral: in the south the Roncalliplatz with the Papstterrasse, in the west the Domvorplatz with the Kardinal-Höffner-Platz, in the east the Domherrenfriedhof and the Heinrich-Böll-Platz, and in the north the Bahnhofsvorplatz.

=== Roncalliplatz ===
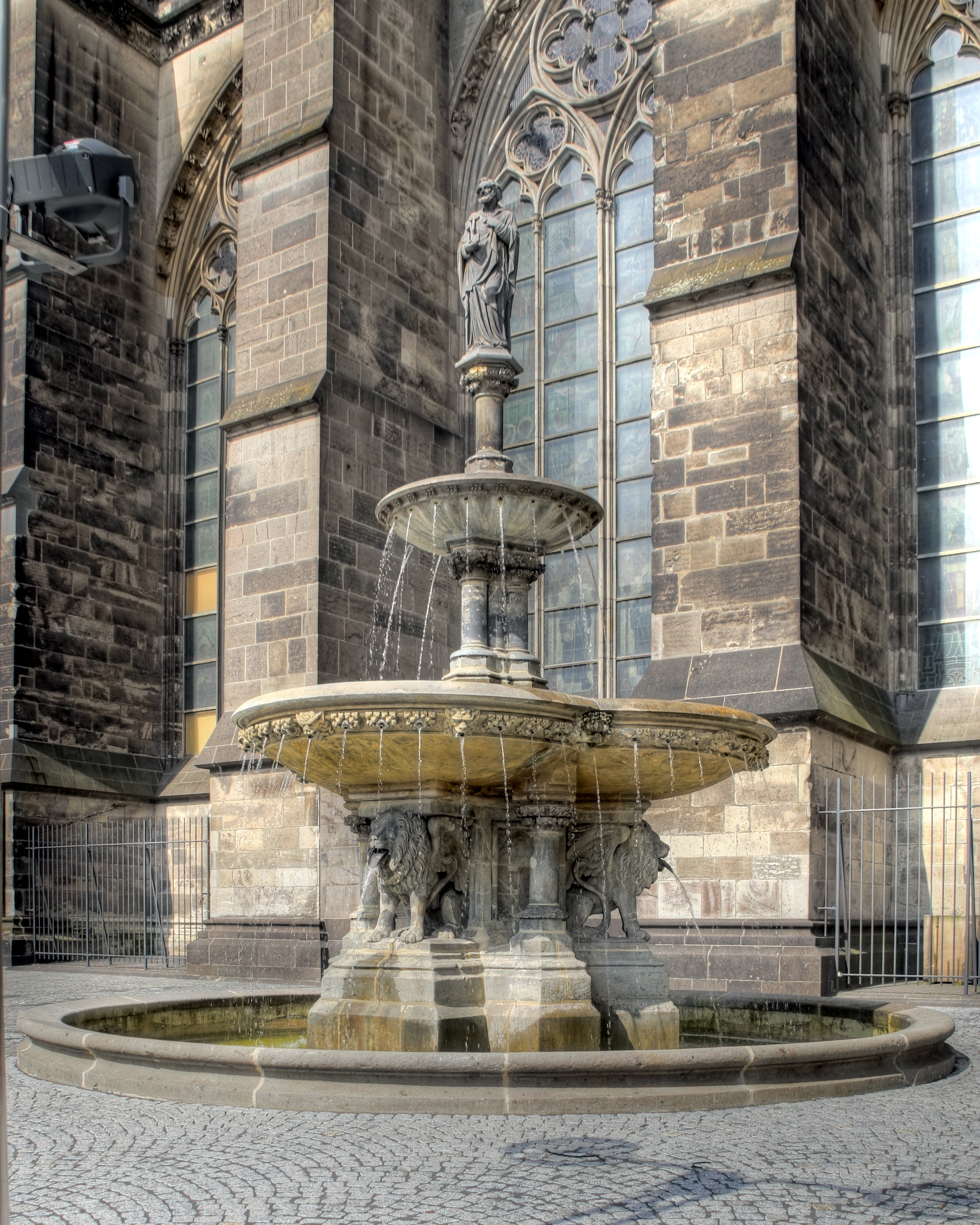
Petrusbrunnen fountain at Roncalliplatz

The Roncalliplatz connects the Domkloster with the street Am Hof. It was named after Pope John XXIII - in 1971 after the construction of the Domplatte. It was called Place Charlemagne; in 1813 during the French period, then Kaiser-Karls-Platz in 1815, then Domhof. In 1972, the house of the Cologne Cathedral Construction Administration was completed at Roncalliplatz 2, which also houses the Dombauhütte. In 1974, the Romano-Germanic Museum was opened at Roncalliplatz 4. In 1984, a sculpture Columne pro Caelo (Column for Heaven) by Heinz Mack was erected, a 68-ton monolith of Portuguese granite.

=== Kardinal-Höffner-Platz ===
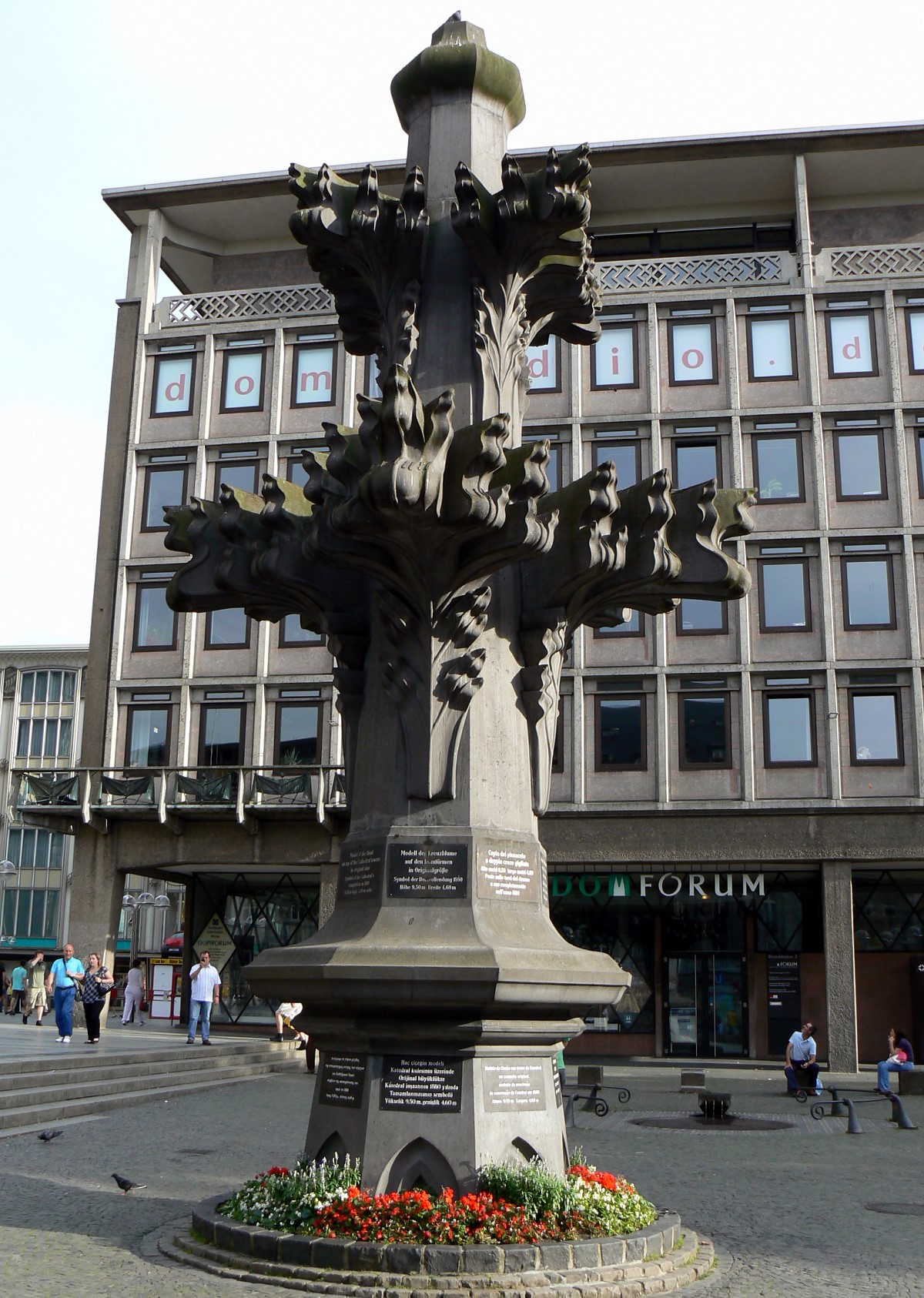
Replica of the Cathedral's finials

Domvorplatz is the name given to the western part of the Domplatte in front of the towers and the main entrance to the cathedral. It features an arch of the Roman North Gate. Since 2008, the area between Domplatte and Trankgasse has been called Kardinal-Höffner-Platz, after Cardinal Joseph Höffner. A full-size replica of the finials of Cologne Cathedral is set up on the square and is a popular meeting place for tourists. However, its location is controversial because it obscures the view of the façade. Therefore, a new place will have to be found for it. Next to it is the Taubenbrunnen, created in 1953 by Ewald Mataré.

=== Heinrich-Böll-Platz ===
To the east of the cathedral choir is the Domherrenfriedhof (canons' cemetery). The members of the Cathedral chapter are buried here in a crypt laid out in 1925. The gravestones are based on a design by the cathedral master builder Arnold Wolff. Below it is the baptistery, an early Christian baptismal font from the 6th century, which had been built on an even older Roman basin. The small, octagonal structure testifies to the transition from pre-Christian antiquity to late antique Christianity. In the most recent rearrangement of the eastern cathedral surroundings in 2017, the baptistery has been joined by the Fountain of Dionysus. The sculpture, created in 1973 by Hans Karl Burgeff, shows a twisted Dionysus, the god of wine.

Dani Karavan designed the Heinrich-Böll-Platz, named after the writer Heinrich Böll from Cologne, between 1982 and 1986. He used the brick of the adjacent museum, granite as on the Domplatte, cast iron as in the main station, and greenery as in the Rheingarten. The Museum Ludwig is on the square.

=== Bahnhofsvorplatz ===
The Bahnhofsvorplatz (station square) connects the hall of the main station and the elevated Domplatte. The open staircase is made of Polish granite and widens to 73 m at the top.

== Buildings and streets in the cathedral surroundings ==
=== Former buildings ===
As usual in the Middle Ages, the area around the cathedral was densely built, with churches, the archbishop's palace and other culturally significant buildings. Buildings included, with their street address in brackets:

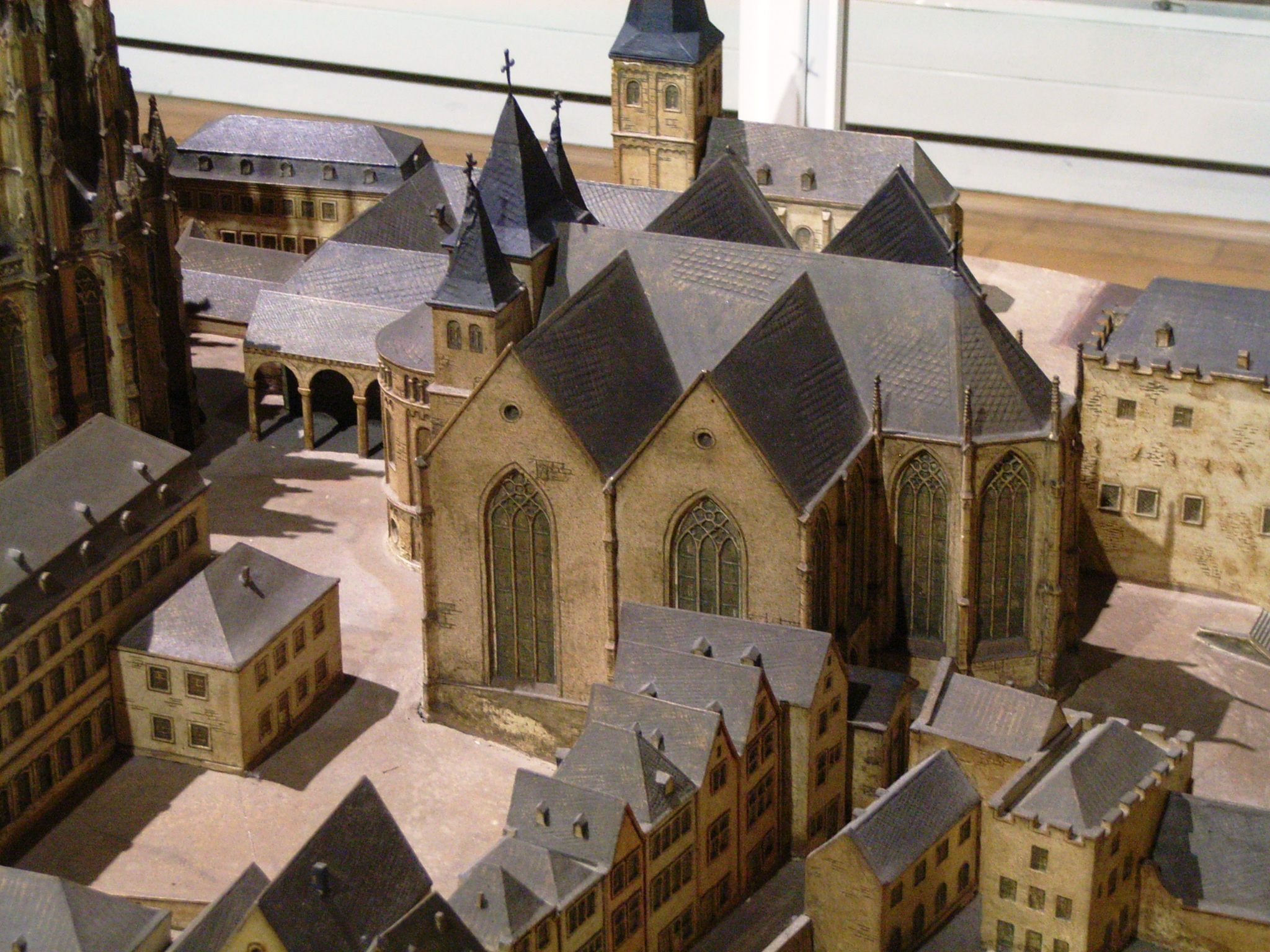
St. Maria ad Gradus, 1062 (model)

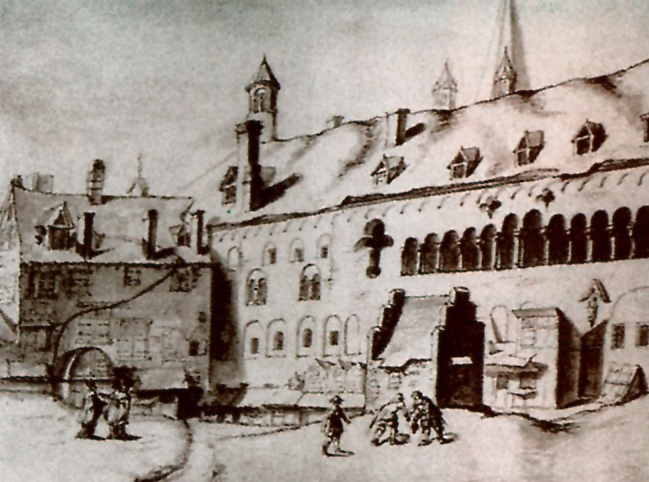
Archbishop's Palace, 1164 (Illustration c. 1670)

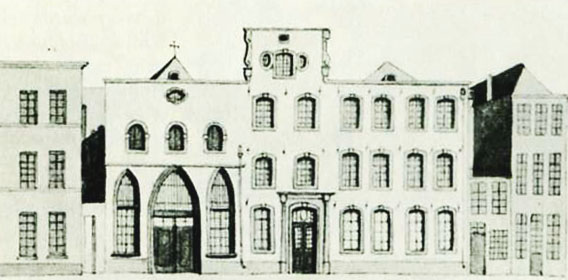
Heiliggeisthaus, around 1170 and "Hacht" (picture before 1840)
- Pfaffenpforte (Unter Fettenhennen/Burgmauer): A former Roman city gate from 90 AD with a central arch 15 m wide and 9 m high. It became the entrance to the cathedral district in the Middle Ages, and then got its names from Pfaffe (pastor), also Porta clericorum, or Porta paphia. The gate was depicted in Mercator's maps as "Paffen pfortz" and "paffinporze". The gate was renovated in 1606, 1616 and 1621, but demolished in 1826.
- Reinaldscher Palast (Domhof): a three-storey Romanesque palace, dating from 1164, can be traced back to Archbishop Rainald of Dassel and served as the archbishops' residence. It was demolished in 1674.
- Haus am Blauen Stein (Domhof): the "house at the blue stone" was the seat of the archbishop's high court, documented in 1243. The blue stone Blaue Steine, blawe steyn, lapis perforatus) was a basalt block in the shape of an elongated square (2.40 metres high and 1.20 metres wide) bearing the episcopal coat of arms..
- Hacht (or "Haicht"; Domhof 9): the episcopal prison was built in 1165. Some women were accused of being witche and tortured. Its name derived from "Haft" (detention). It consisted of the "Hachtgericht" court and the actual prison. An execution ceremony involved first presenting the offender at the cathedral courtyard in front of the archiepiscopal palace, then proceeding from the prison to the "Blauee Stein" in front of the palace.
- Heiliggeisthaus, also Hospital Geisthaus, next to the Hacht (Domhof): a hospital and pilgrims' hostel existed as early as the 12th century as an institution for the care of the urban poor. It was sold and demolished around 1840.
- Linneper Hof or Reifferscheider Hof (Domhof): a residence of a noble family, serving as the house of the Reifferscheid family from Linnep Castle, Sayn-Wittgenstein and Neuenahr. It was documented in 1075 as an old bishop's palace. From 1746 to 1827, it served as the Priesterseminar Köln seminary for priest. It was demolished in 1864. The site now houses the Roman-Germanic Museum.
- St. Maria ad Gradus: a collegiate church was located halfway between the cathedral choir and the Rhine. The name translates to Maria to the stairs. The church housed the tomb of Richeza, Queen of Poland and granddaughter of Emperor Otto II and his wife Theophanu. The church was built in 1062 and connected to the former cathedral (Alter Dom), which Archbishop Anno II had laid out, from about 1075. The church was demolished in 1817 during the secularisation forced by the French occupation.
- Domkloster 1: a three-storey palace from 1830 was inhabited by Simon Oppenheim after his marriage to Henriette Obermeyer. Frederick William IV. and his wife Elisabeth were there guests on the occasion of the laying of the new foundation stone of Cologne Cathedral on 4 September 1842. The palace was affected by the regulation of the road Unter Fettenhennen in June 1883.
- On the south side of Domkloster 2, a palace was built in 1843 as a residential and commercial building for Abraham Oppenheim, who moved here from Trankgasse 9. Ferdinand Mülhens had it converted into a hotel, Savoy Hotel Großer Kurfürst, in 1892, opened on 3 November 1893. In addition to the side bay windows crowned by gables and the corner facing Wallrafplatz, which is decorated by an onion tower, the north façade is distinguished by a central dome with a lantern. An interior renovation took place in 1910, since then it has been called the Savoy Hotel. In 1931, the roof and façade were reconstructed.
- Domkloster 3: Friedrich Schmidt designed the Schaeben House from 1859, which was ready for occupancy in November 1861. It belonged to Peter Schaeben, the owner of the Klosterfrau Melissengeist company, and was thoroughly renovated in 1911.
- Domkloster 4-6: Simon Oppenheim's brother Abraham Oppenheim lived in a newly built house, for which Jacob Kaaf carried out the interior decoration, from 1843 onwards. In 1873 he moved to his summer residence Gut Bassenheim.
- Domkloster 6: in the late Middle Ages, it was a gabled house with a stepped gable and rising round-arched frieze, built around 1230/1250. The spirits merchant Joseph Seelig owned the house around 1855. In the Gründerzeit, the parents of the poet Karl Cramer (1807-1860) lived there.
- Domkloster 8: during the late Middle Ages, it was a three-storey eaves house with a stepped hipped roof, into which the Dommädchenschule, a school for girls, moved. In order to create more free space for the cathedral, the entire building complex (Domkloster 2–8) was demolished from November 1886.
- The small sloping alley Auf der Litsch led past the west facade of Cologne Cathedral in a north–south direction and connected Trankgasse and Domkloster. Around 1530, the alley was called Op der Letsch, and since 1797 it was called Auf der Litsch. The cathedral initially had the house number Auf der Litsch 2 in 1811 according to the Itinéraire de Cologne. At Auf der Litsch 1, the nun Maria Clementine Martin nursed the sick cathedral vicar Johannes Gumpertz in his house from April 1825 and began distilling the world-famous Klosterfrau Melissengeist here. From 17 June 1827 onwards, she produced her "ächtes Carmeliter-Wasser" (genuine Carmelite water) in a house she had purchased at Domhof No. 19. The cathedral priest's houses Auf der Litsch 4 and 6 were demolished in 1843. During the French period, Auf der Litsch 1 was given the number 2581. After the cathedral was completed, its immediate surroundings including this alley fell victim.

=== 20th century ===
The area around Cologne Cathedral became an urban space with a metropolitan character. Buildings, with their street address in brackets, include:

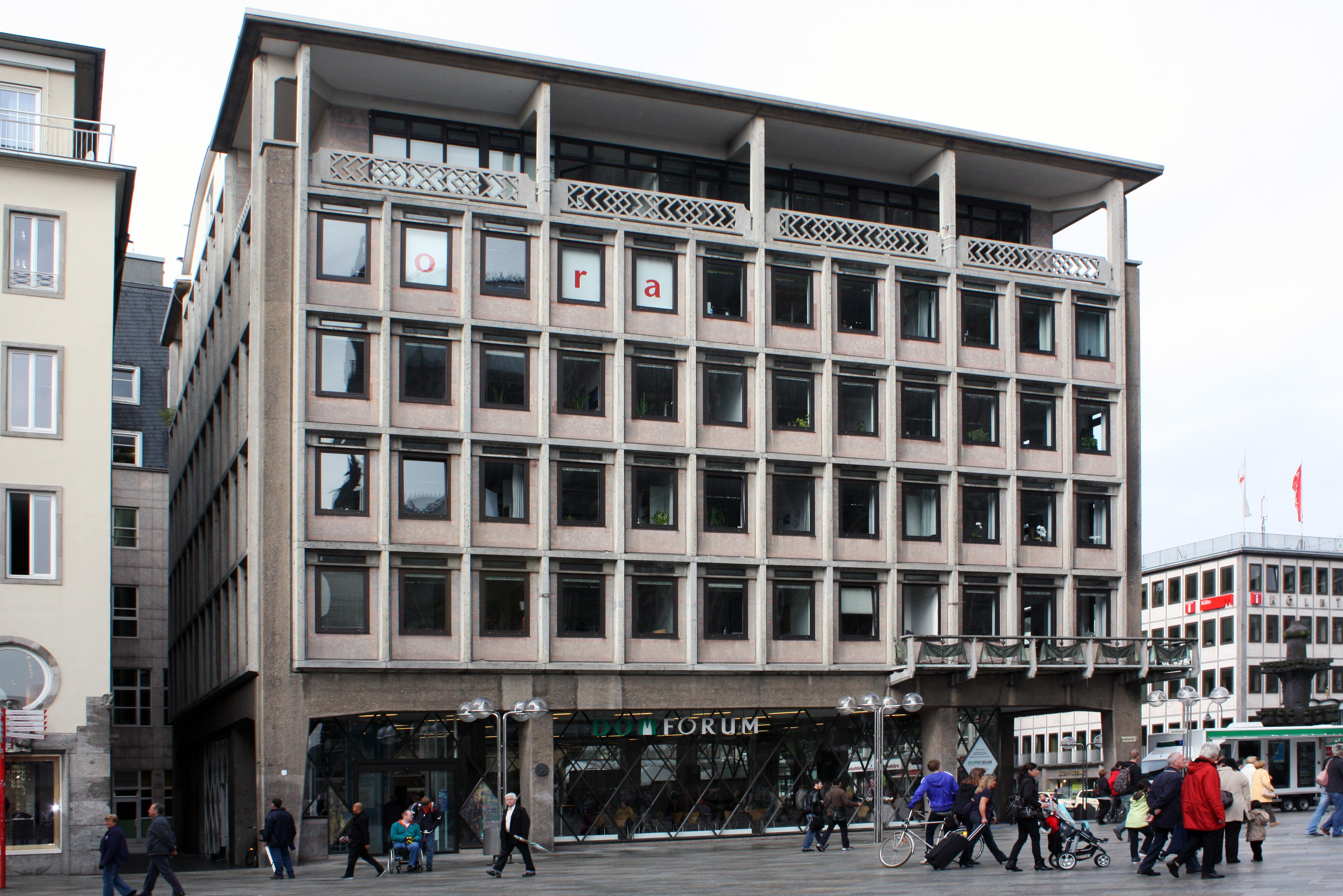
Domforum, 1953

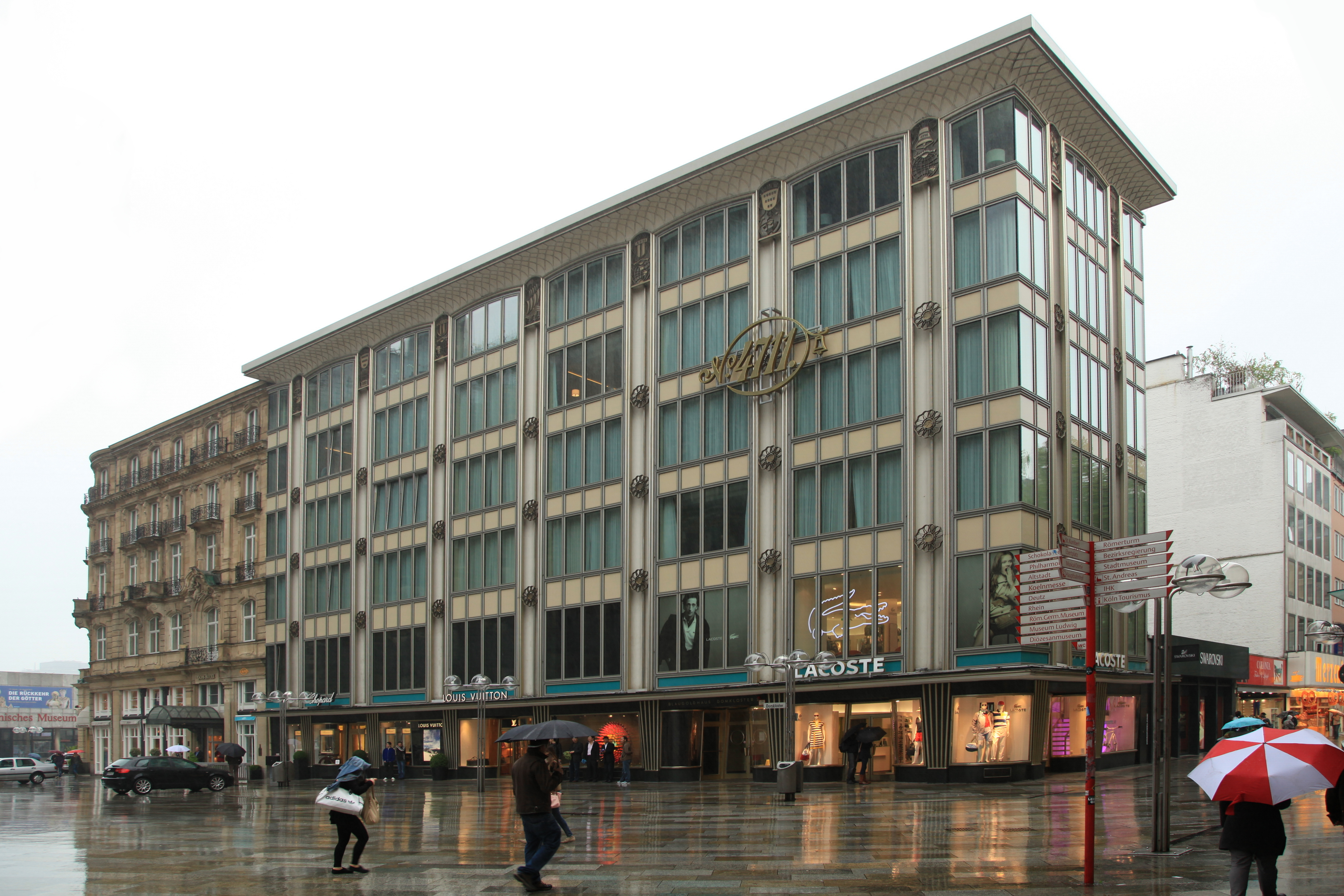
Blau-Gold-Haus, 1952

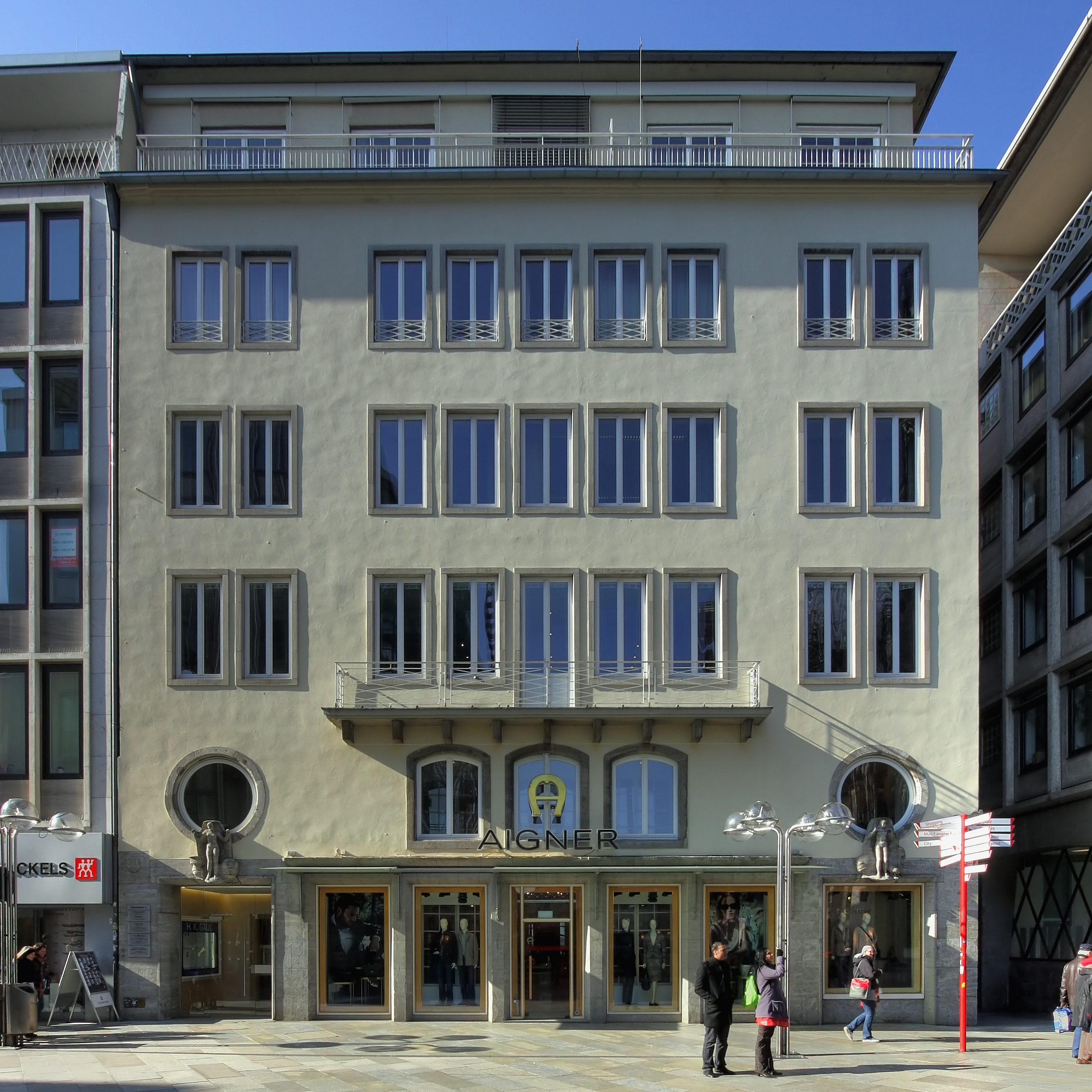
Haus Goldschmidt, 1928

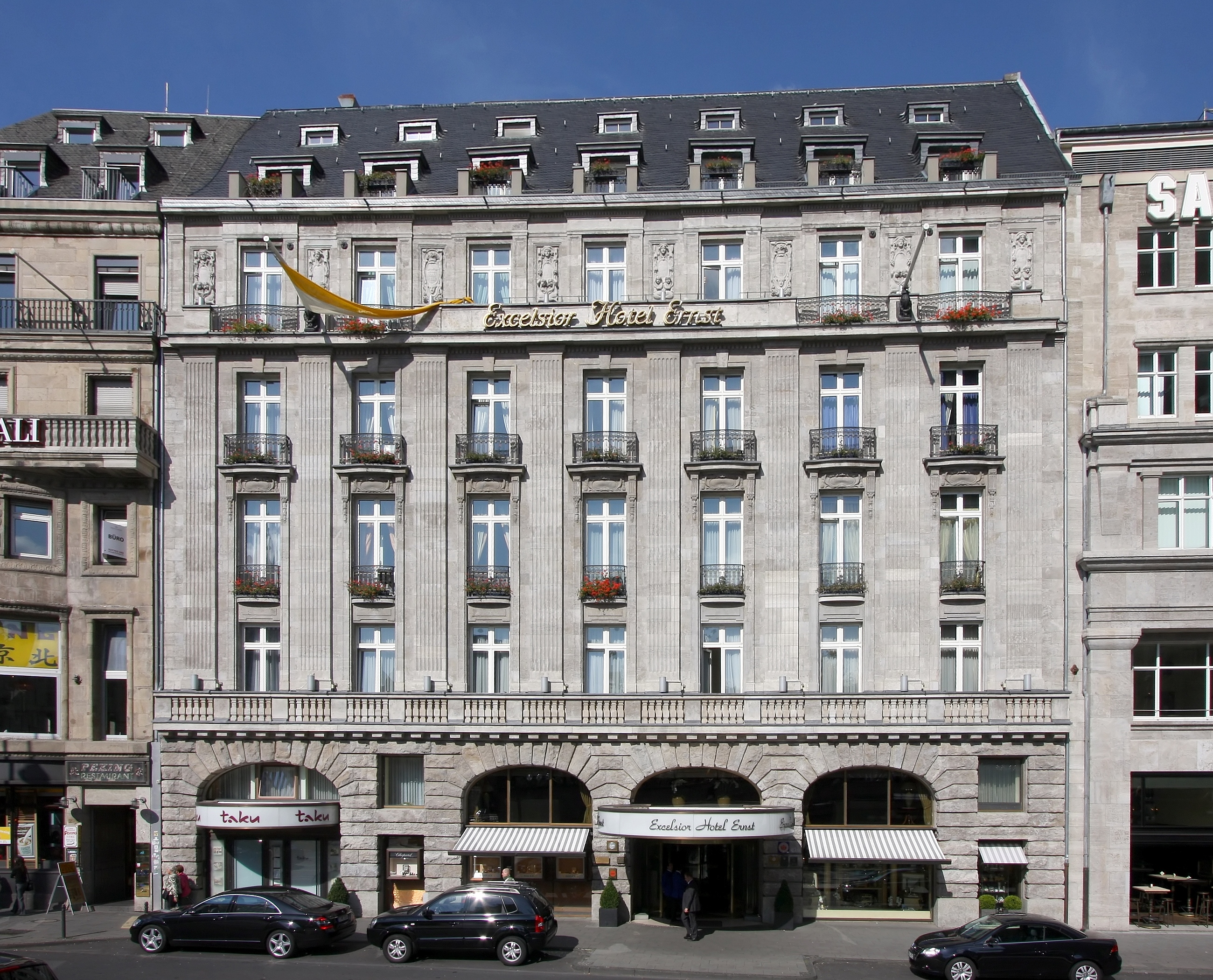
Excelsior Hotel Ernst, 1910
- Kölner Dombauverwaltung (Roncalliplatz 2): the building of the administration of Cathedral building was completed in 1972. It also houses the Cologne Cathedral publishing house, the cathedral building archive, and (on the sixths floor) the Cathedral master builder's flat. The Diocesan museum, which had also been housed there, was transferred to the new as Kolumba on 15 September 2007.
- Romano-Germanic Museum (Roncalliplatz 4)
- Museum Ludwig (Heinrich-Böll-Platz)
- Haus Goldschmidt (Domkloster 1/under Fettenhennen 4): a neo-Gothic residential and commercial building of the jeweller Goldschmidt with four upper floors and a stacked storey was built in 1928 by Paul Bonatz.
- Blau-Gold-Haus (Domkloster 2)
- Dom-Hotel (Domkloster 2a)
- Domforum (Domkloster 3): the Bank für Gemeinwirtschaft first moved into a new building with atrium, which was built in 1953 by Fritz Schaller. The Roman Catholic Archdiocese of Cologne acquired the office building in 1991 for DM 79 million. Since October 1995, it has housed the Domforum for church public relations work and, since June 2000, the Domradio.
- Kölner Dom (Domkloster 4)
- Excelsior Hotel Ernst (Trankgasse 1–5)
- Deichmannhaus (Trankgasse 7–9): a residential and commercial building built in 1868 by Hermann Otto Pflaume
- Tourist Office (Kardinal-Höffner-Platz 1): it was completed in December 1955 according to plans by Hans Joachim Lohmeyer.
- Cologne Main Station
- Reichardhaus mit Café Reichard (under Fettenhennen 11): built in 1903/04, it was acquired by the broadcaster WDR in 1966. The café looks back to a long tradition, as Georg Reichard opened a café at Hohe Straße 154 on 9 November 1855, which moved to the new building in 1905. Of the 800 seats, 400 have a unique view of the cathedral, especially from the glass pavilion built in 1986.
- Dionysoshof: it was built in 1973 to designs by Hans Karl Burgeff at the eastern end of the Domplatte. The Dionysosbrunnen fountain was created at the same time.

== Importance and criticism ==
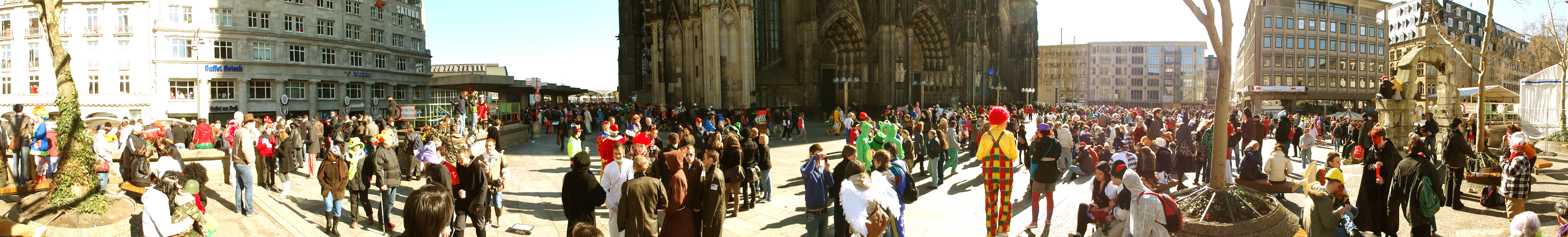
Popular place: Cathedral surroundings during carnival

"There is always something happening on the Domplatte and Roncalliplatz. ... For skaters and rollerbladers, for acrobats, street musicians and pavement painters, the areas in the shadow of the venerable cathedral become a private open-air stage." The Domplatte, together with Roncalliplatz, is the most highly frequented Cologne pedestrian zone. When on 13 October 1970 the Japanese Emperor Hirohito Cologne on 13 October 1970, the Domplatte proved to be an ideal visitor stage. Since then, events such as Cologne's largest Christmas market or open-air concerts, for example by Frank Sinatra (farewell concert on 6 June 1993), Liza Minnelli (15 June 1997), the Bläck Fööss (for their 40th anniversary, 5 September 2010), BAP (for the 35th anniversary, 27 May 2011) and in memory of Trude Herr (summer 1995). A strict set of rules allows a maximum of six major events per year, with the exception of church services. The controversial Cologne Wailing Wall was banned by the Cologne Higher Regional Court in May 1997, and since September 2011 the public order service has been able to punish skateboarding on the Domplatte as a non-permitted Sondernutzung with a warning fine.

The Domplatte together with the cathedral were voted the most popular place in Germany in the programme of 22 September 2006 in the ZDF series Unsere Besten. However, the "massive concrete belt around the cathedral" was also strongly criticised again and again and even called "Cologne's biggest eyesore. Although the Domplatte frees the cathedral from its island location surrounded by traffic, the concreting has created barren landscapes, foul-smelling corners and meeting places for social fringe groups. Critics say that the cathedral has been "robbed of its feet" by the Domplatte.
