= Linneper Hof =

German mansion

Coordinates: 50.940721°N 6.958762°E

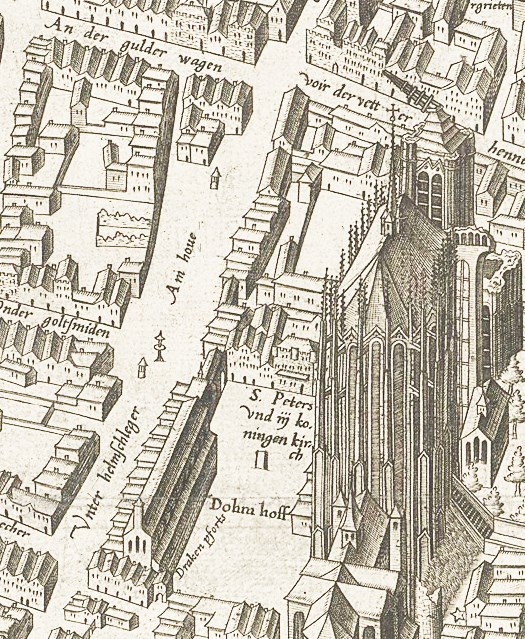
Arnold Mercator: Cologne city map from 1570, southern cathedral in the front (S-N). The Linneper Hof is almost completely hidden by the cathedral choir.

The Reifferscheider Hof or Linneper Hof was a Residenz of the Reifferscheid, Linnep, Sayn-Wittgenstein and Grafschaft Neuenahr families in the Cathedral quarter of Cologne. It was inhabited by numerous members of the Cologne diocese until the 1740s, and was an emphyteusis of the cathedral monastery. It was demolished in 1864. Today, the area on which the Hof stood is part of the grounds of the Romano-Germanic Museum.

== History and notable residents ==
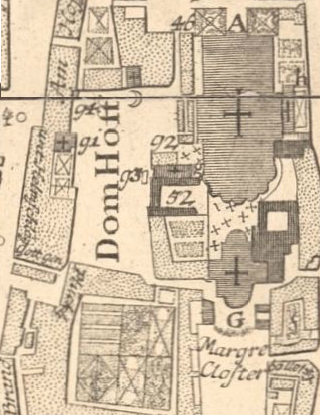
Johann Valentin Reinhardt: Cologne city plan from 1570, Domhof (SN). Legende: – Holy Ghost Hospital 52 – Cologne Seminary (earlier: Linneper Hof) 91 – Spiritual Court 92 – High Court 93 – Blue Stones 94 – Hacht (Jail)

The Hof was a hereditary monastery yard of the Cologne Cathedral monastery, which was used as a canonic house. It was located immediately south of the choir building of Cologne Cathedral on the Domhof, east of the church of St. Johann Evangelist.

The Hof was originally the Episcopium (Bishop's residence) of the Archbishop of Cologne, and was called the "Old Palace" (antiquum palatium). Around 1237 or 1238, it was donated by Archbishop Heinrich I von Müllenark (d. 1238) to the cathedral chapter as a canon's residence. The canon Herimann von Heppendorf (d. 1257), a brother of Gerhard II. von Heppendorf (d. 1259) lived in the house. Both were the sons of Hermann II. (IV.) von Heppendorf-Alpen (d. 1234/35) and Agnes von Linnep.

The house was subsequently inhabited by members of the Reifferscheid family; as Cologne canons, Heinrich I (d. 1318), Heinrich II (d. after 1330), Heinrich I (d. 1318) and Heinrich II (d. after 1330) are mentioned and Gerhard von Reifferscheid (d. after 1371). Ownership of the Hof went to Wilhelm von Sombreffe, who in 1397 handed it over to the canon Gottfried Lordship of Heinsberg, Graf of Chiny. Gottfried of Chiny sold it in 1398 to the canon and sub-dean Johannes II of Linnep (d. 1431), prior von St. Gereon. The Reifferscheider Hof was then given the nickname Linneper Hof.

The Hof next came into the possession of the Cologne canon Dietrich von Linnep (d. 1461), the last agnate male descendant of the lords of Linnep. After his death, the hof came briefly into the possession of the cathedral provost Gottfried von Sayn-Wittgenstein (d. 1461). After his death, his brother, the vicar general Werner von Sayn-Wittgenstein (d. 1472), provost of St. Gereon, wanted to sell the hereditary estate of Reifferscheid (domus hereditarie de Rifferscheit) on the cathedral courtyard in August 1462 to the Cologne canon and Aachen provost Johann von Neuenahr (d. 1466), a son of the Cologne hereditary bailiff Gumprechts (II.) IV von Neuenahr (d. 1484) and grandson of Mechthild of Reifferscheidt. Johann von Neuenahr, however, did not want to live in the enclosure and left the house to the competent heirs. The Hof was handed over one month later by the executors to cathedral chaplain (later cathedral provost) Georg I of Sayn-Wittgenstein (d. 1510). Georg I presented it in 1477 to the Trier Archbishop John II of Baden (1434–1503, r. 1456), but "only for life". Archbishop Johann, who had just been appointed as Maximilians I of Austria's envoy had communicated the courtship of Mary of Burgundy in Ghent, was staying in Cologne at the same time as the Archduke, who was arriving for the betrothal, at the time the house was given to him and four days later on 23 July 1477 concluded a coinage agreement with Electoral Mainz, Electoral Palatinate and Jülich.

The Hof was given to the Cologne canon Dietrich II zu Nuenair (d. 1505) even before the death of Archbishop Johann,. As Dietrich II became provost of Soest in 1499, he declared that the Hof, which had been left to him, should revert to the Count's House of Wittgenstein. The Hof fell a few years later to a grandson of Eva von Linnep, the canon Friedrich d. J. von Neuenahr (1504–1527).

In 1528, hereditary bailiff Gumprecht (II., IV.) VI. von Neuenahr-Alpen (d. 1555), as the only brother of Friedrich who had died in the previous year, finally renounced the Hof, in favour of Domkeppler Georg von Sayn-Wittgenstein (1558) as the next ecclesiastical heir of the Lords of Linnep. Bernhardt Maeß, canon of St. Gereon in Cologne, agreed to waive 200 gold florins which he had invested in the Linneper Hof or the tenements connected with it in the cathedral courtyard of Cologne, if later on the sons of Count Gumprecht became canons. As late as 1532 Gumprecht (II., IV.)- VI was still using the house. In the following years, Georg von Sayn-Wittgenstein appeared as the owner of the Hof.

In 1534, the Lenneper (a misspelling) was rented to the burgher Mathias Vorsbach (d. 1557), who lived there with his wife Jutta von Lachem (d. after 1607; ∞ 2nd Helmig von Siegburg) and his family. Matthias Vorsbach was tried from 1551 onwards for not having his child baptised as an infant; he died in prison in Brühl. Georg von Sayn-Wittgenstein placed the Linneper Hof at the disposal of the cathedral dean and later archbishop Gebhard I von Mansfeld-Vorderort in 1552. (1524–1562, r. 1558).

In 1747/50, the Roman Catholic Archdiocese of Cologne bought the Linneper Hof next to the church of St. John the Evangelist from the cathedral chapter to gain space for a new building for the Cologne Seminary, which was built by Michael Leveilly on the Domhof from 1746 to 1748. The seminary was moved in 1827, and the building was demolished in 1864.

== Sources ==
- Historisches Archiv der Stadt Köln (Bestand 101 Schreinsbücher, Hacht A 413–426; Bestand 202H Schreinsurkunden Hacht; Bestand 102V Schreinsurkunden Schöffenschrein among others)
- Erzbischof Heinrich v. Cöln schenkt dem Domcapitel zu einer Canonical-Wohnung das Haus auf dem Domhof, der alte Pallast genannt, bei der Johannis-Capelle …, Februar 1237. In Theodor Joseph Lacomblet (collab.): Urkundenbuch für die Geschichte des Niederrheins, vol. II. Wolf, Düsseldorf 1846, Nr. 226, p. 117f
- Klaus Militzer (collab.): Die Protokolle des Kölner Domkapitels, vol. I Regesten 1454–1511 (Publications of the Society for Rhenish Historical Studies 77). Droste, Düsseldorf 2009
- Statut des Domstiftes von Köln. 1534 November 6. In Samuel Muller Das Eigentum an den Domcurien der deutschen Stifter. In Westdeutsche Zeitschrift für Geschichte und Kunst 10 (1891), p. 369.
- Günter Aders (collab.): Urkunden und Akten der Neuenahrer Herrschaften und Besitzungen Alpen, Bedburg, Hackenbroich, Helpenstein, Linnep, Wevelinghoven und Wülfrath sowie der Erbvogtei Köln. (Inventare nichtstaatlicher Archive 21). Landschaftsverband Rheinland, Köln 1977 (PDF des Landschaftsverbandes Rheinland)
