= Christian Schaller (architect) =

German architect

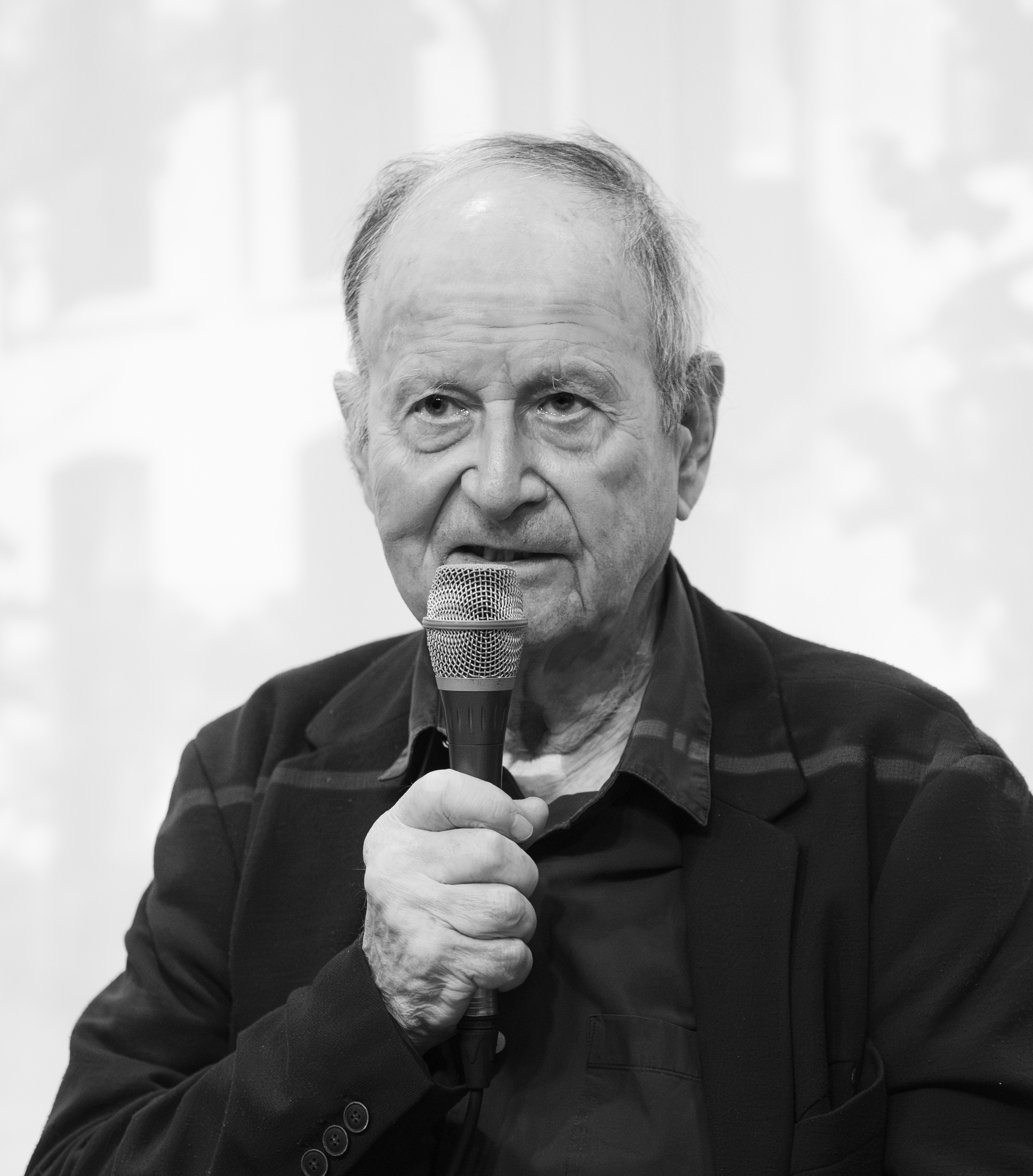
Christian Schaller

Christian Schaller (born 4 November 1937) is a German architect working in Cologne and the Rhineland.

== Career ==
Born in Berlin, Schaller grew up in Höxter with his mother; his father Fritz Schaller had been appointed to the municipal reconstruction company in Cologne in 1947. Christian Schaller studied architecture in Hanover, Karlsruhe and at Technische Universität Berlin under Bernhard Hermkes, where he graduated as Diplom-Ingenieur in 1965.

After completing his studies, he joined his father's office in Cologne, where he played a key role in the completion of the Church of St. Paul in Weckhoven, where a new type of folding concrete roof was used in collaboration with Stefan Polónyi. Christian Schaller carried out further church construction projects in office partnership with his father (Schaller & Schaller GbR). However, he strove early on to develop quarters instead of individual buildings, and in 1968, together with other architects, he founded (other data 1971) the design team 8 (dt8) planning group, with which he was active until 1991, focusing on public participation, urban design and housing construction. In 1978, for example, the group won the competition for the residential development on the site of the former Stollwerck chocolate factory in Cologne's Severinsviertel, which was completed in 1985.

The dt8 group finally disbanded in 1995; Schaller worked with founding member Helmut Theodor as Büro Schaller/Theodor Architekten from 1992 until Theodor retired in 2011.

A major project from this period was the residential development at Beethovenpark, which received recognition at the Deutscher Architekturpreis.

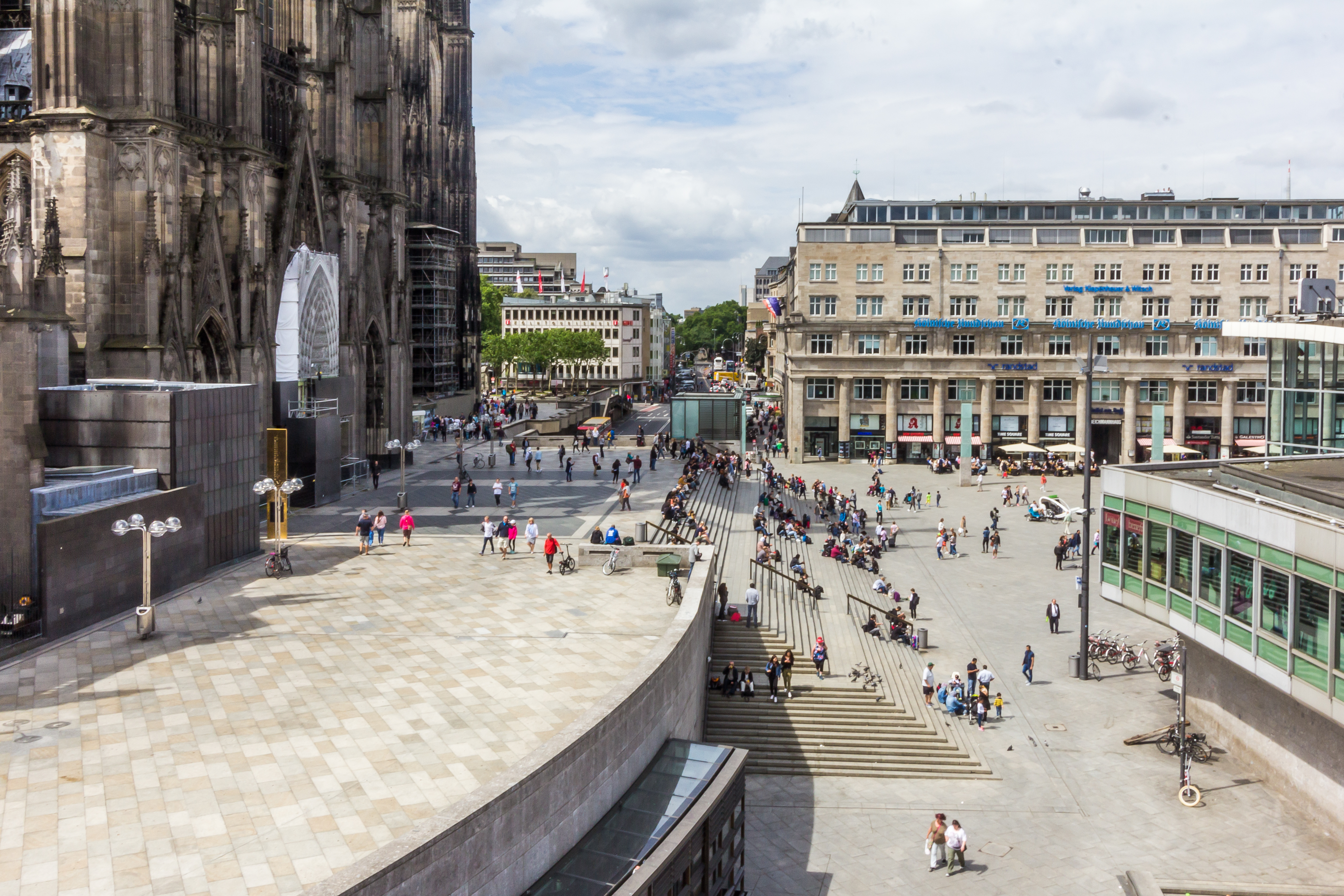
Cathedral steps and station forecourt, Cologne

In the course of the redesign of the surroundings of the Cologne Cathedral, in which the Domplatte designed by Fritz Schaller - equipped with geometric-brutalistic elements - was to be heavily modified, Schaller developed the decisive concept for the north side with stairs and station forecourt - and also asserted his copyright to the extent that he was able to implement this concept himself until 2006. This period also saw a major urban development project in Tianjin, China, which he implemented in several sections together with other partners.

From 2015 he operated as Schaller Partner GbR, and from 2017 as Schaller Architekten Stadtplaner BDA.. Schaller was involved in the board of the Association of German Architects from 1992 to 2007 and was chairman of the Association of German Architects from 2011 to 2014 Haus der Architektur Köln. Außerdem ist er Mitglied im Architektur Forum Rheinland und im Deutscher Werkbund NRW. In these functions and beyond, he regularly participates in the most relevant urban planning discussions in Cologne.

== Realisations ==
=== With Fritz Schaller ===
- 1966–1968: St. Paulus in Weckhoven

=== dt8 ===
- 1974: Wohnhaussiedlung Am Wäldchen, Meckenheim-Merl
- 1978–1985: Wohnbebauung ehemaliges Stollwerck-Gelände
- 1988: Sanierung und Ausbau der denkmalgeschützten Kriegsruine eines Jugendstilhauses, Hülchrather Straße 3, Cologne.
- 1990: "Anno-Riegel", Former Stollwerck site.

=== Schaller/Theodor or Schaller Partner ===
- 1994: Wohnbebauung Beethovenpark, Cologne
- 2000: U-Bahnhof mit Busbahnhof und P+R Tiefgarage Bensberg.
- 2004: Altenberger Hof, Conversion into an event venue with restaurant.
- 2006: Neubau der Kölner Domtreppe und Neugestaltung des Bahnhofvorplatzes Köln
- 2006: Eisenbahnversicherungskasse Wohn- und Bürogebäude, Volksgartenstraße, Cologne
- 2015: U-Bahnhof Chlodwigplatz, Cologne

== Awards ==
- 1971: Kölner Architekturpreis, Herrenschuhladen De Lorenzi
- 1975: Kölner Architekturpreis für Modegeschäft Hermès
- 1980: Kölner Architekturpreis für denkmalgerechte Sanierung des Gasthofes Em Ahle Kohberg, Cologne Merheim
- 1985: Kölner Architekturpreis für Stollwerck-Gelände, Cologne
- 1988: Auszeichnung Landeswettbewerb, "Ökologisches Bauen" für Hülchrather Straße 3, Cologne
- 1989: Auszeichnung vorbildlicher Bauten im Lande Nordrhein-Westfalen für die Stollwerck-Bebauungen.
- 1990: Kölner Architekturpreis für die Sanierung der Bottmühle, Cologne
- 1990: Kölner Architekturpreis für den Anno-Riegel (Stollwerck-Gelände). Cologne
- 1995: Recognition of the German Architecture Award for the Beethovenpark residential development.
- 1998: BDA Award for Good Buildings District Group Ruhr Area
- 2006: Recognition Cologne Architecture Prize for the new cathedral staircase.
