= Rumold Mercator =

Flemish cartographer (1641–1599)

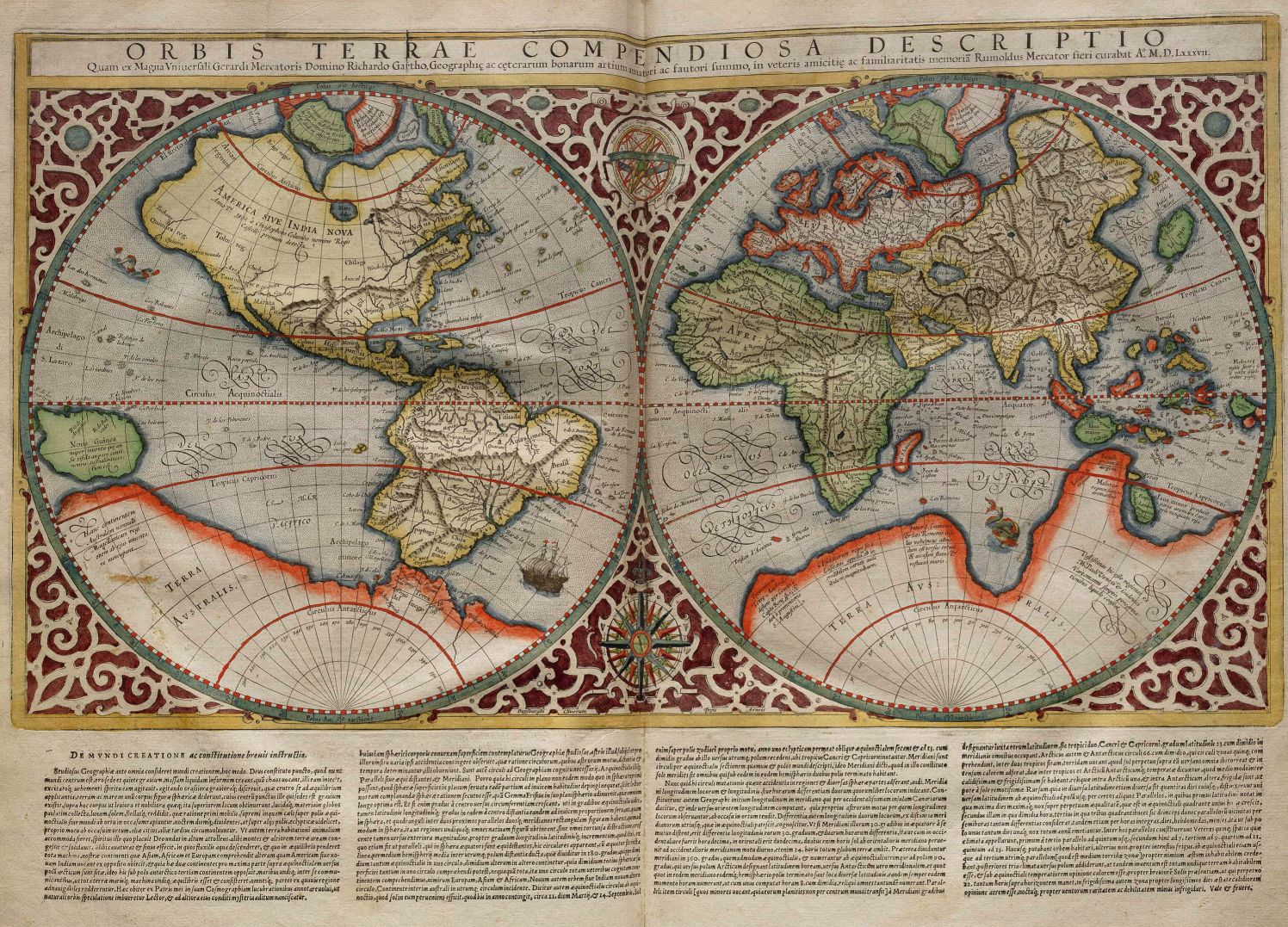
Planisphere made by Rumold Mercator, 1587

Rumold Mercator (1541 in Leuven – 31 December 1599 in Duisburg) was a cartographer, son of Gerardus Mercator and brother of Arnold Mercator, both also cartographers.

He completed some at the time unfinished projects left after his father's death and added new materials of his own research.

== Biography ==
Rumold Mercator was the youngest son of cartographer Gerardus Mercator and his first wife Barbara Schellekens. He rose to fame in his father's wake when, in 1587, he published a copy of his father's Ptolemaic map of the world from 1569, revised in its overall graphic design.

In 1595, a year after his father's death, Rumold Mercator published a supplement of 34 maps to his father's Tabulae Geographicae map book. It contains 29 maps, engraved by Gerardus Mercator, of the missing parts of Europe (Iceland, the British Isles and the Northern and Eastern European countries).

To complete the map collection quickly, Rumold added his own world map from 1587 and had four maps of the continents from his father's large world map from 1569 copied by his nephews Gerardus Mercator junior and Michael Mercator, sons of Arnold Mercator. The title page was also an emergency solution: it is the title of the Ptolemy edition of 1578, on which the new title was pasted in letterpress.

Rumold Mercator also released a 'complete edition' with all 107 maps. In fact, this edition is no more than a single-bound reissue of the four series Tabulae Geographicae with the new addition.
