= Stefan Polónyi =

German engineer (1930–2021)

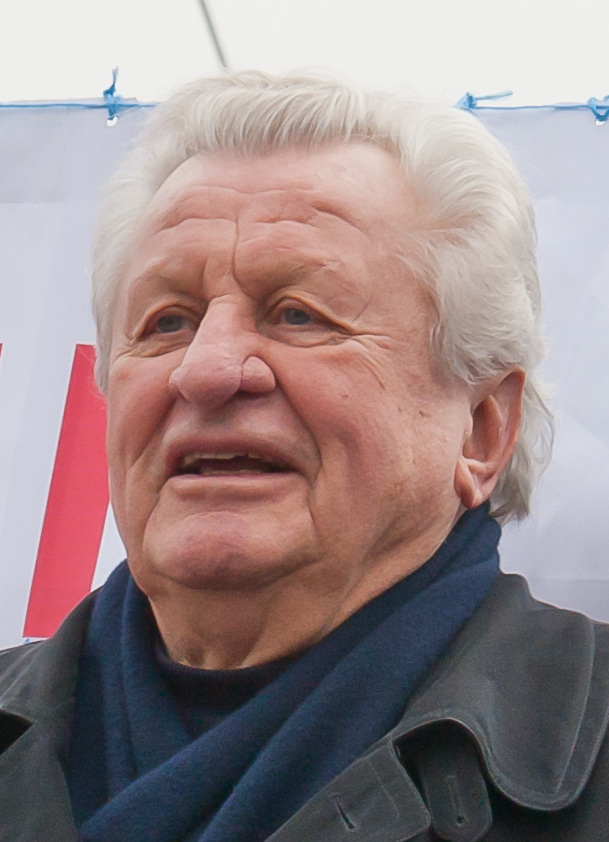
- Polónyi in 2013
- Born: 6 July 1930; Gyula, Kingdom of Hungary
- Died: 9 April 2021 (aged 90); Cologne, Germany
- Occupation: Engineer

Stefan Polónyi (6 July 1930 – 9 April 2021) was a Hungarian-born German civil engineer.

== Biography ==
Polónyi studied civil engineering at the Budapest University of Technology and Economics. He left Budapest for Cologne in 1956 and opened his office the following year, called Stefan Polónyi & Partner. In 1965, he became a professor of engineering at Technische Universität Berlin before he held the same position at TU Dortmund University starting in 1971. There, he invented the "Dortmund model" of joint training for engineers and architects.

Stefan Polónyi died in Cologne on 9 April 2021 at the age of 90.

== Works ==
- St. Suitbert Church in Überruhr (1963)
- Keramion in Frechen (1971)
- Technoseum in Mannheim (1982–1990)
- Galeria auf dem Messegelände in Frankfurt (1980–1983)
- Kunstmuseum Bonn in Bonn (1985–1993)
- Bahnsteigüberdachung des Kölner Hauptbahnhofs in Cologne (1990)
- Car & Driver Autohaus in Hamburg (1990–1991)
- Leipzig Trade Fair (1991–1995)
- Willy-Brandt-Haus in Berlin (1992–1996)
- Messehalle 2 in Hanover (1992–1996)
- Harenberg City-Center in Dortmund (1993–1994)
- Bundespräsidialamt in Berlin (1994–1998)
- Krickesteg im ERIN-Park Castrop-Rauxel (1994)
- Klosterkapelle Frenswegen (1996)
- Doppelbogenbrücke im Nordsternpark von Gelsenkirchen (1996)
- Gitternetzbrücke im Nordsternpark von Gelsenkirchen (1997)
- Stege West im Nordsternpark von Gelsenkirchen (1997)
- TZU-Fußgängerbrücke in Oberhausen (1997)
- Wohn- und Geschäftshaus Eigelstein 115 in Cologne (1997)
- Tiergartenbrücke in Dessau-Roßlau (2000)
- Straßenbrücke Ripshorster Straße in Oberhausen (2008)

== Publications ==
- Schalen in Beton und Kunststoff: Entwurf, Bemessung, Ausführung (1970)
- Einige Gedanken zum wissenschaftlichen Stand der Baustatik (1981)
- Der Tragwerksingenieur und seine Wissenschaft (1982)
- Mit zaghafter Konsequenz: Aufsätze und Vorträge zum Tragwerksentwurf 1961–1987 (1987)
- Über Tektonik in der Baukunst (1993)
- Die neue Stahlbetonkonzeption (1996)
- Beton Atlas – Entwerfen mit Stahlbeton im Hochbau (2001)
- Architektur und Tragwerk (2003)
