= Cologne Wailing Wall =

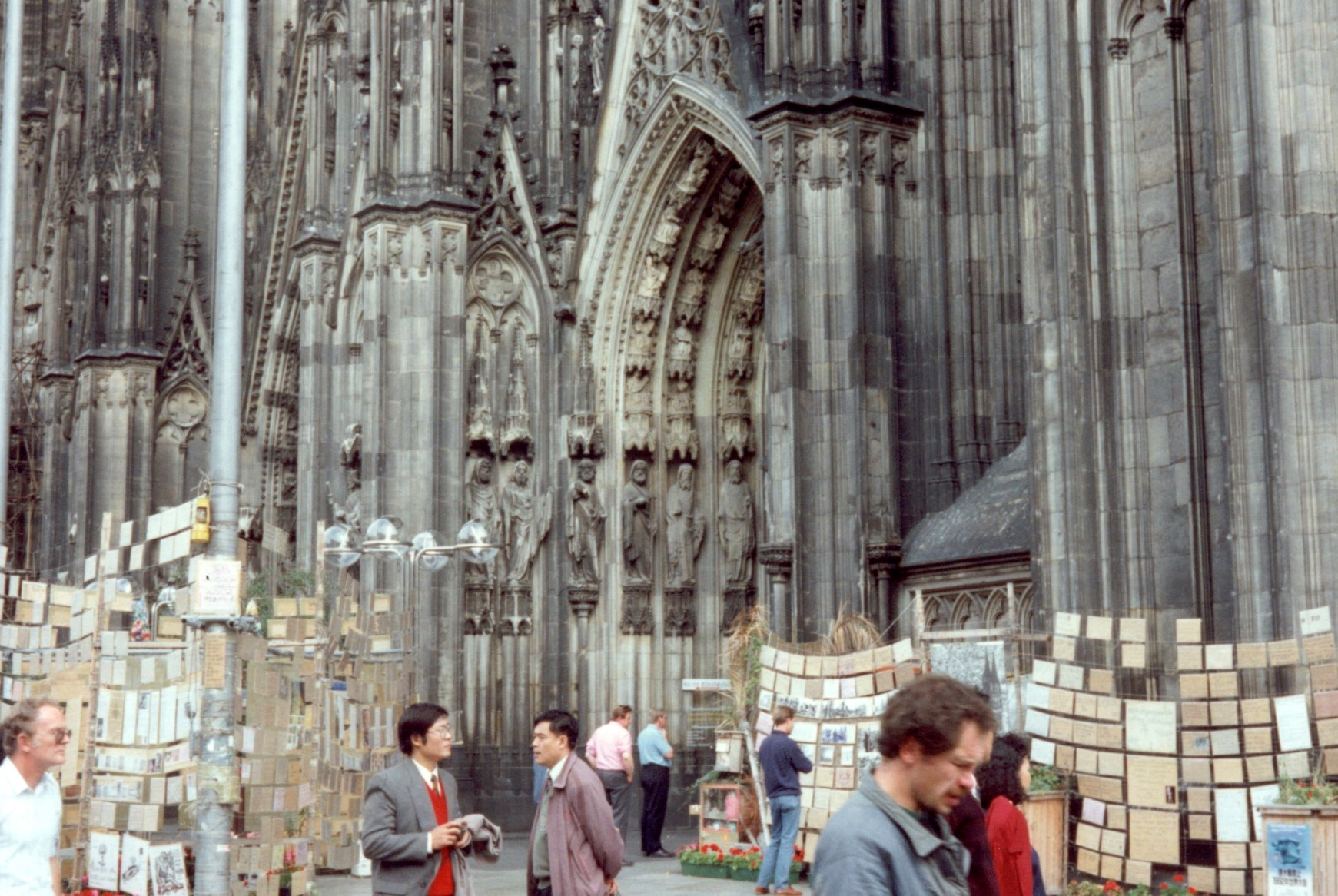
Cologne Wailing Wall in 1994.

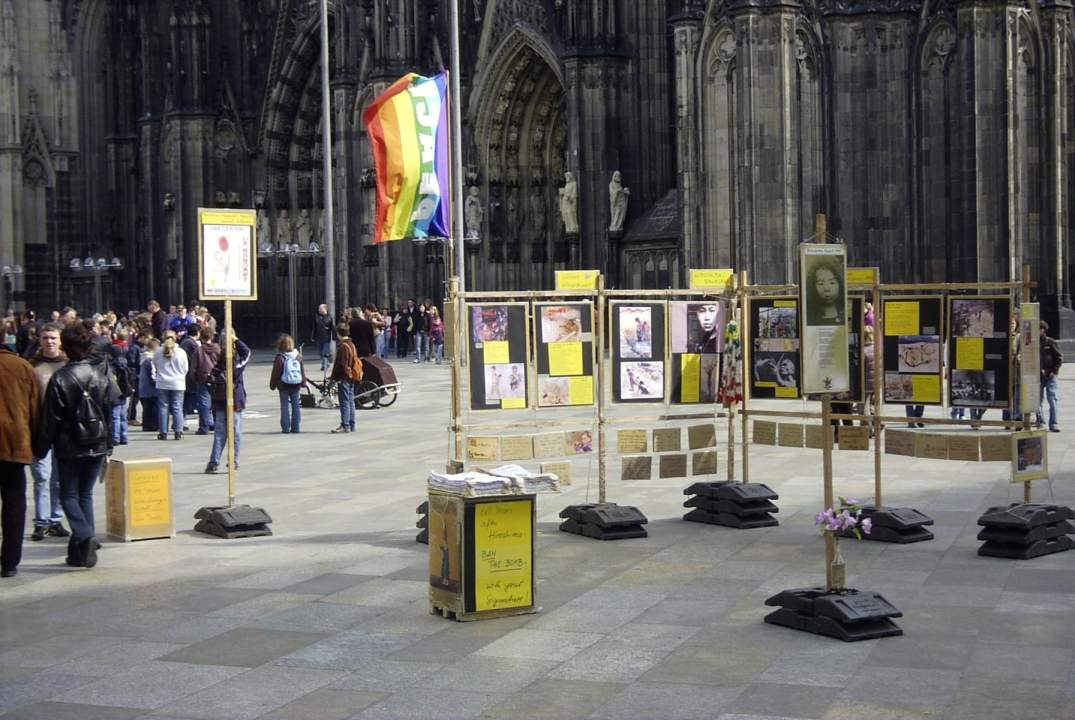
Wailing Wall against nuclear proliferation in 2006.

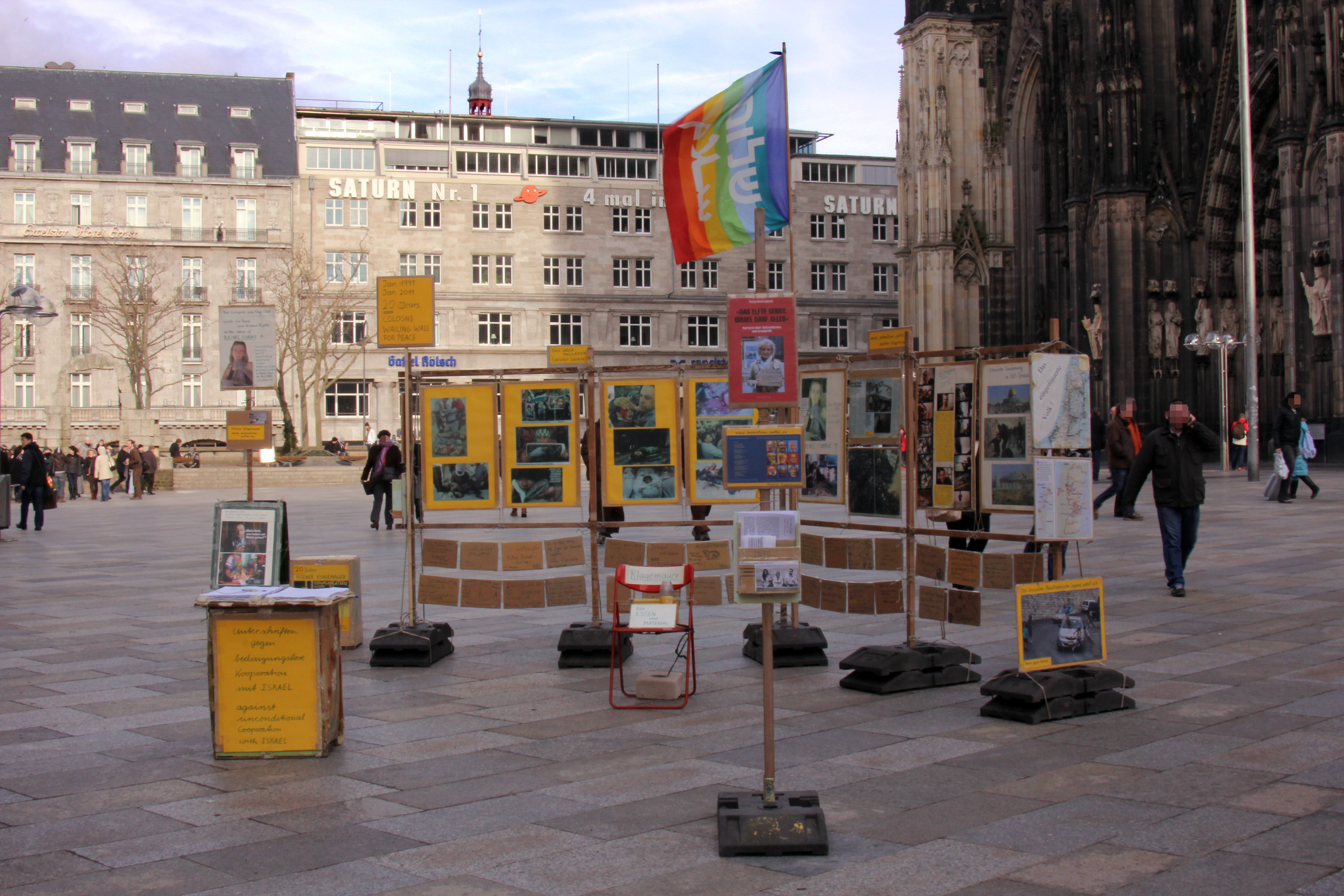
The Wailing Wall in 2011. In the night, the black mobile base plates were stored on the property of German public-broadcasting institution Westdeutscher Rundfunk (WDR) nearby.

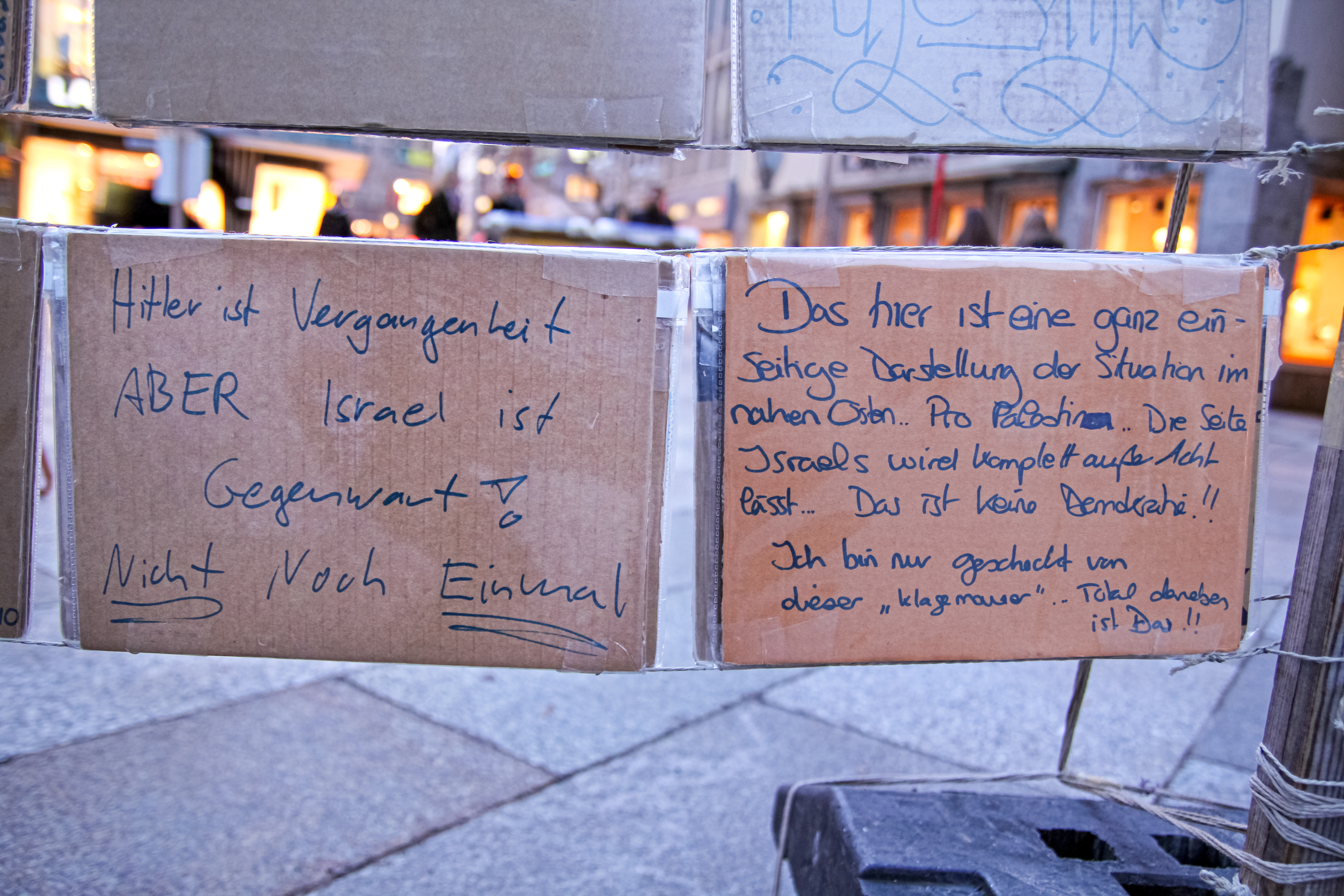
Two messages from January 2011: on the left, one containing Adolf Hitler and Israel, on the right a sharp criticism of the one-sidedness of the Wailing Wall.

The Cologne Wailing Wall was created at the end of 1980 by Walter Herrmann in the Schildergasse in Cologne, western Germany.

== Overview ==
Messages denouncing the living conditions of Palestinian people were written on small cardboard pieces and suspended on clotheslines. The "Wailing Wall" was erected in 1991 in front of the south tower of the Cologne Cathedral, supported by a vigil against the Second Gulf War. The authorities attempted to stop the project multiple times, using lawsuits, confiscations and evictions.

Until 1997, 50,000 supporters used this form of open communication to post their messages of solidarity, calls for social justice or letters of support on cardboard. The project was awarded the Aachener Friedenspreis in 1998.

The "Wailing Wall" was reactivated in 2004 by Walter Herrmann. The project was criticized and accused of one-sidedness and antisemitism.
