= Arnold Mercator =

German cartographer

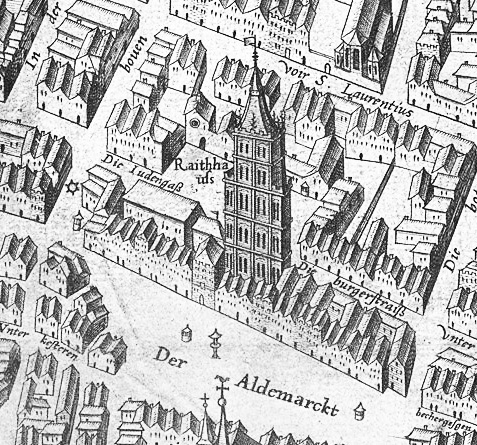
City map of Cologne by Mercator; detail of the town hall

Arnold or Arnoldus Mercator (Leuven, 31 August 1537 – Duisburg, 6 July 1587) was a Southern Netherlandish cartographer, mathematician and classical philologist. He was the eldest son of cartographer Gerardus Mercator and a brother of Rumold Mercator.

== Life ==
=== Leuven ===
Arnold was the eldest child of Gerardus Mercator and Barbara Schellekens from Leuven, who married in 1536. Arnold grew up in Leuven and, as a 7-year-old boy, witnessed the arrest of his father, who was then a professor in Leuven. Gerardus Mercator was suspected of Lutheranism. His father was released after a few months. The family remained impoverished in Leuven for a few more years until 1552.

=== Duisburg ===
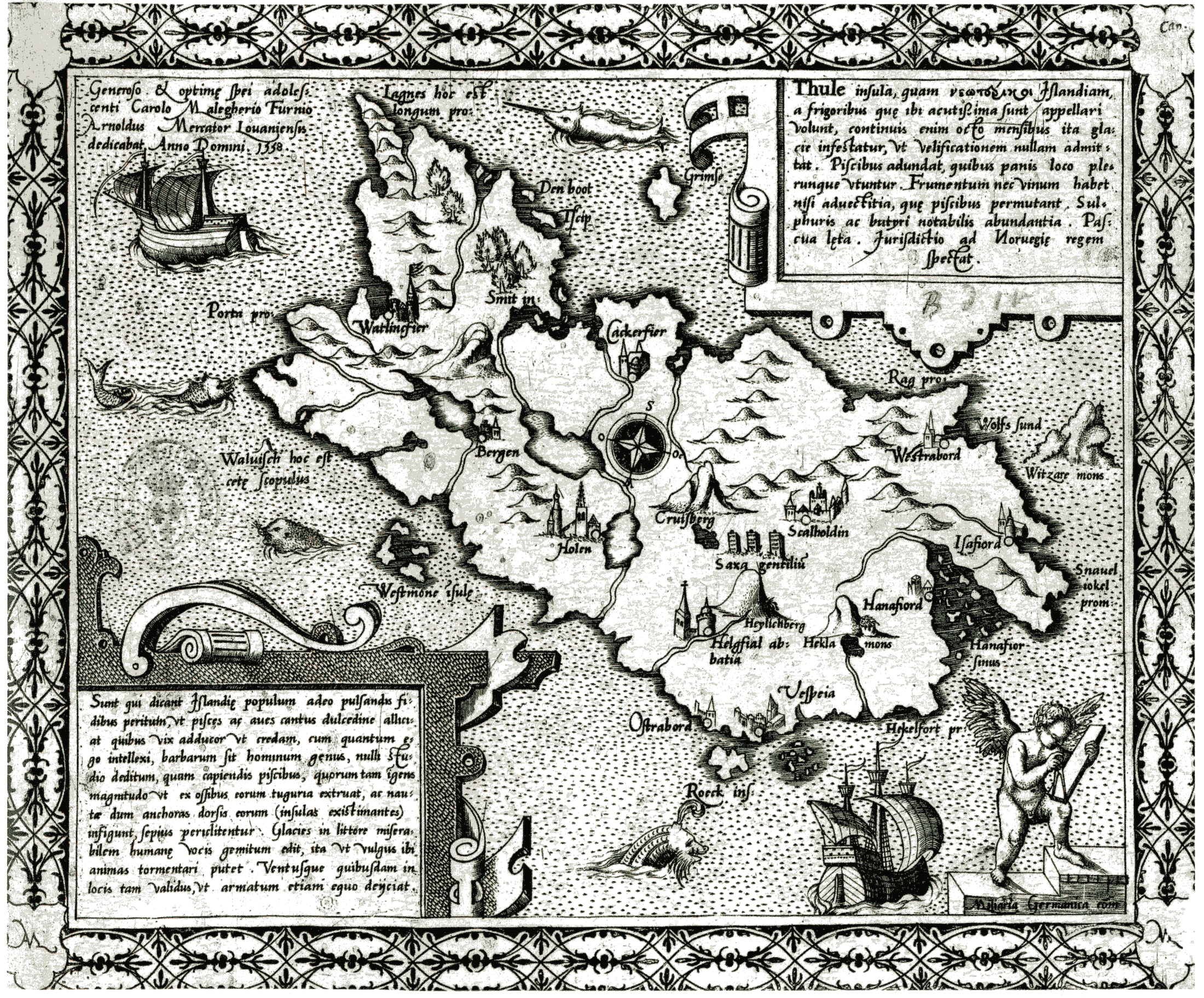
Map of Iceland, 1558

In 1552 the Mercator family moved to the imperial city of Duisburg. The Duke of Cleves, the Lutheran William V, was hospitable to humanist scholars. Gerardus Mercator may have been attracted by the Duke's intention to found a university in Duisburg. Arnold learned the trade of cartography and mathematics from his father. He began as a cartographer in 1558 with a map of Iceland. His map of the Trier diocese from 1566 is also documented.

Arnold Mercator came to Cologne in 1569, where the city council submitted his drawing of the city's floor plan for a decision on 11 September 1570. The drawing formed the first, masterfully executed city map of Cologne and is the basis for the famous copper engraving from 1571, the Cologne city view from 1570 (Kölner Stadtansicht von 1570), which is dedicated to Cologne's Archbishop Salentin of Isenburg. From a bird's eye view, the city map shows not only the streets with 196 location information, but also the individual buildings in three-dimensional form and relatively true to scale (scale 1: 2450) in the format 109 × 170 cm. The engraving was published on 31 August 31 1571 - Arnold Mercator's birthday. Arnold Mercator created the first city map of Cologne in 1570, which was based on precise calculations and served as the basis for the city plans created later. He made, albeit less elaborate, city plans of Windeck, Homberg and Trier. He created many maps in the Bergisches Land. The map Grenzen des Bergischen Amtes Windeck und der Herrschaft Homburg ("borders of the Bergisches Amt Windeck and the rulership of Homburg") from 1575 is very well known. The map was copied by Hans Weirich in 1995 and reissued with the help of the Bergisches Geschichtsverein - Oberberg department.

Arnold also devoted himself to classical philology. At Werden Abbey he examined manuscripts written in Visigothic and Latin, dating back to the time of the Visigothic king Alaric. Arnold's son Michaël later reported on the notes that Arnold drew up during his literary research there.

Arnold Mercator's sons Johannes (1562? –1595?), Gerhard (around 1565–1656) and Michael (around 1567–1614) were also cartographers. Arnold died at his home in Duisburg in 1587. His three sons continued his cartographic work. His father Gerardus Mercator was still alive in 1587, when he died.
