= Fleuron (architecture) =

Flower-shaped architectural ornament

A fleuron is a flower-shaped ornament, and in architecture may have a number of meanings:

1. It is a collective noun for the ornamental termination at the ridge of a roof, such as a crop, finial or épi.
2. It is also a form of stylised Late Gothic decoration in the form of a four-leafed square, often seen on crockets and cavetto mouldings.
3. It can be the ornament in the middle of each concave face of a Corinthian abacus.
4. Finally, it can be a form of anthemion, a Greek floral ornament.

== Gallery ==
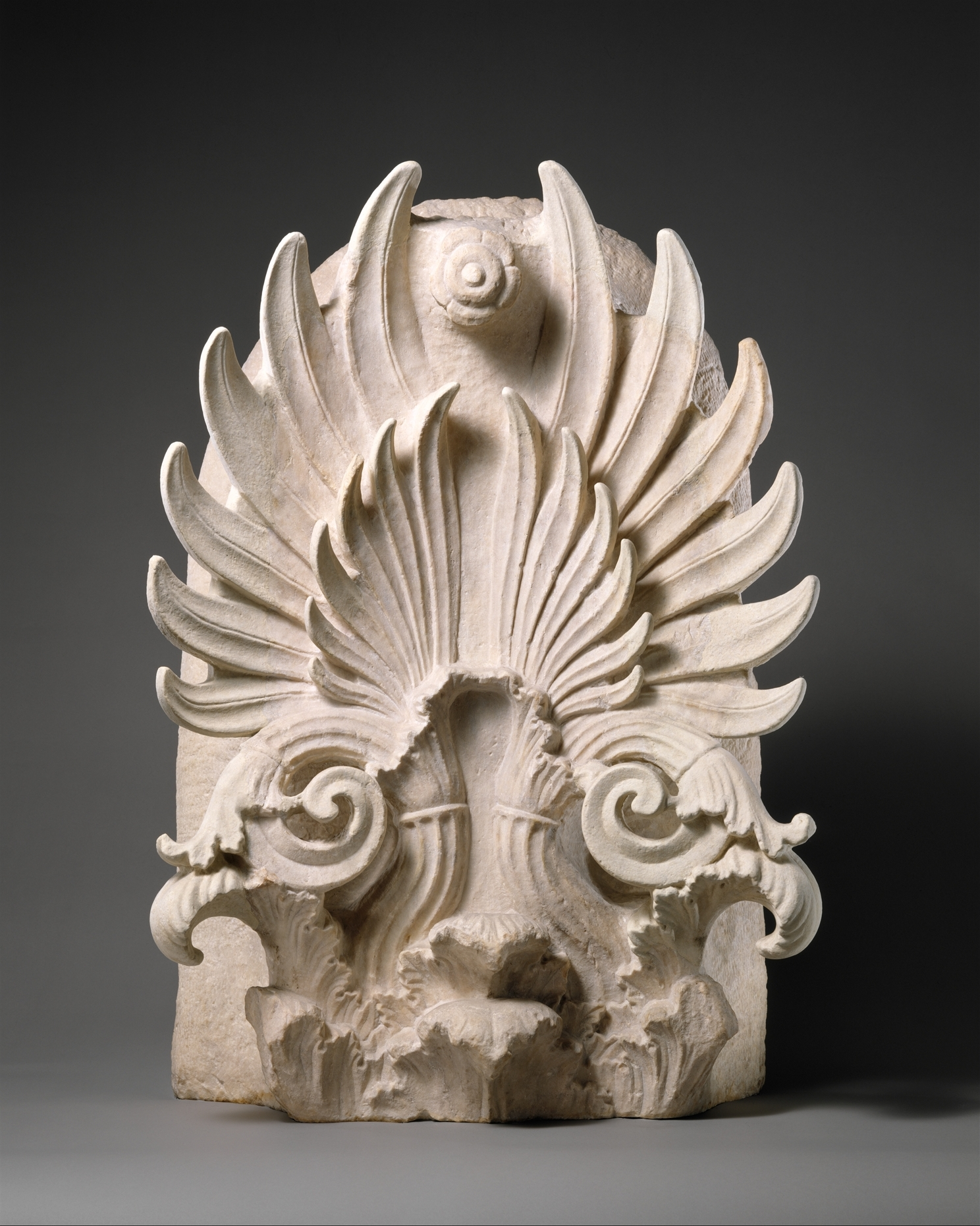
Ancient Greek fleuron as an anthemion (Greek word for flower), c. 350–325 BC, marble, Metropolitan Museum of Art, New York City

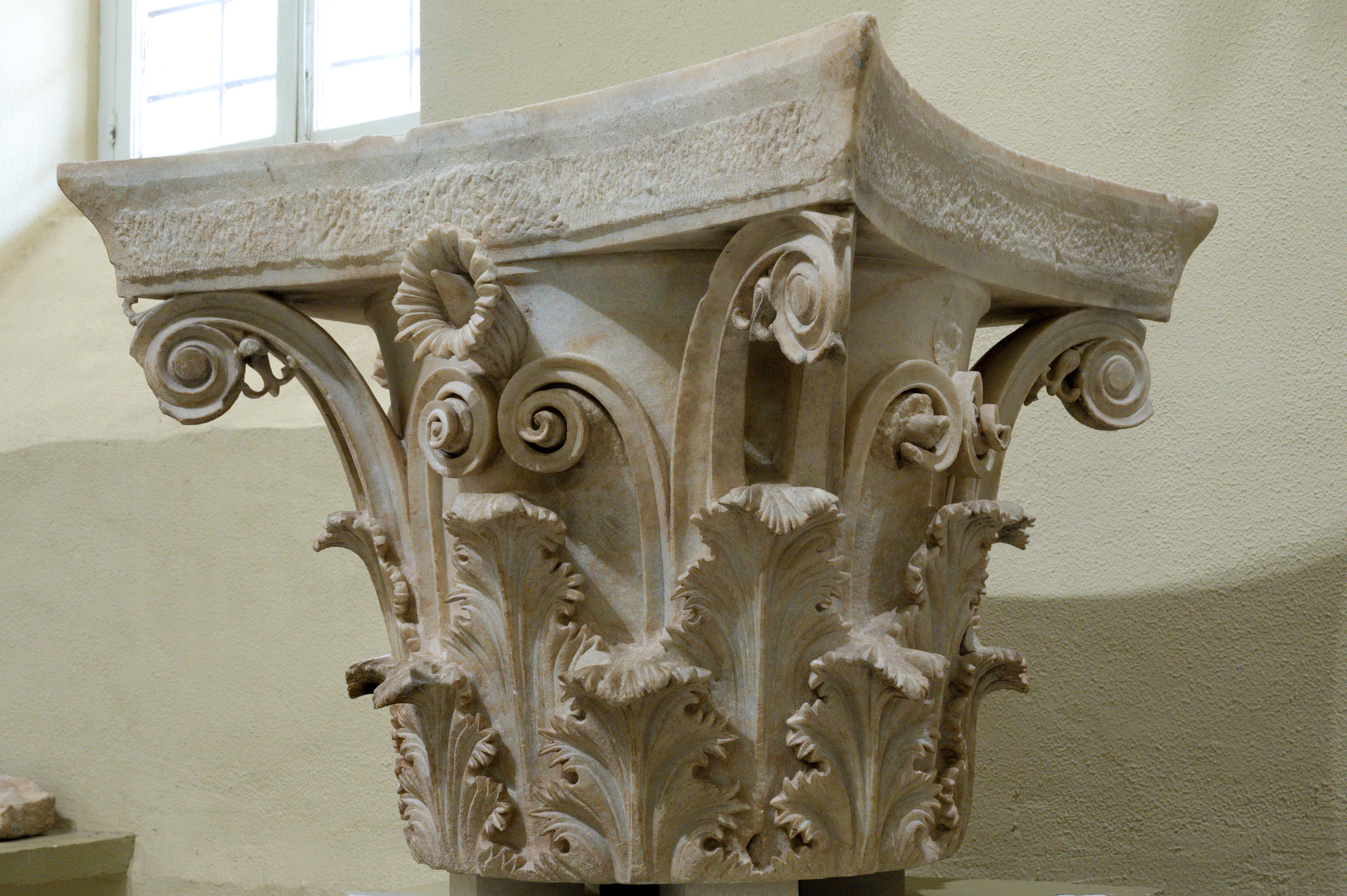
Ancient Greek Corinthian capital with a fleuron on the abacus, from the tholos at Epidaurus, said to have been designed by Polyclitus the Younger, c.350 BC, stone, Archaeological Museum of Epidaurus, Greece

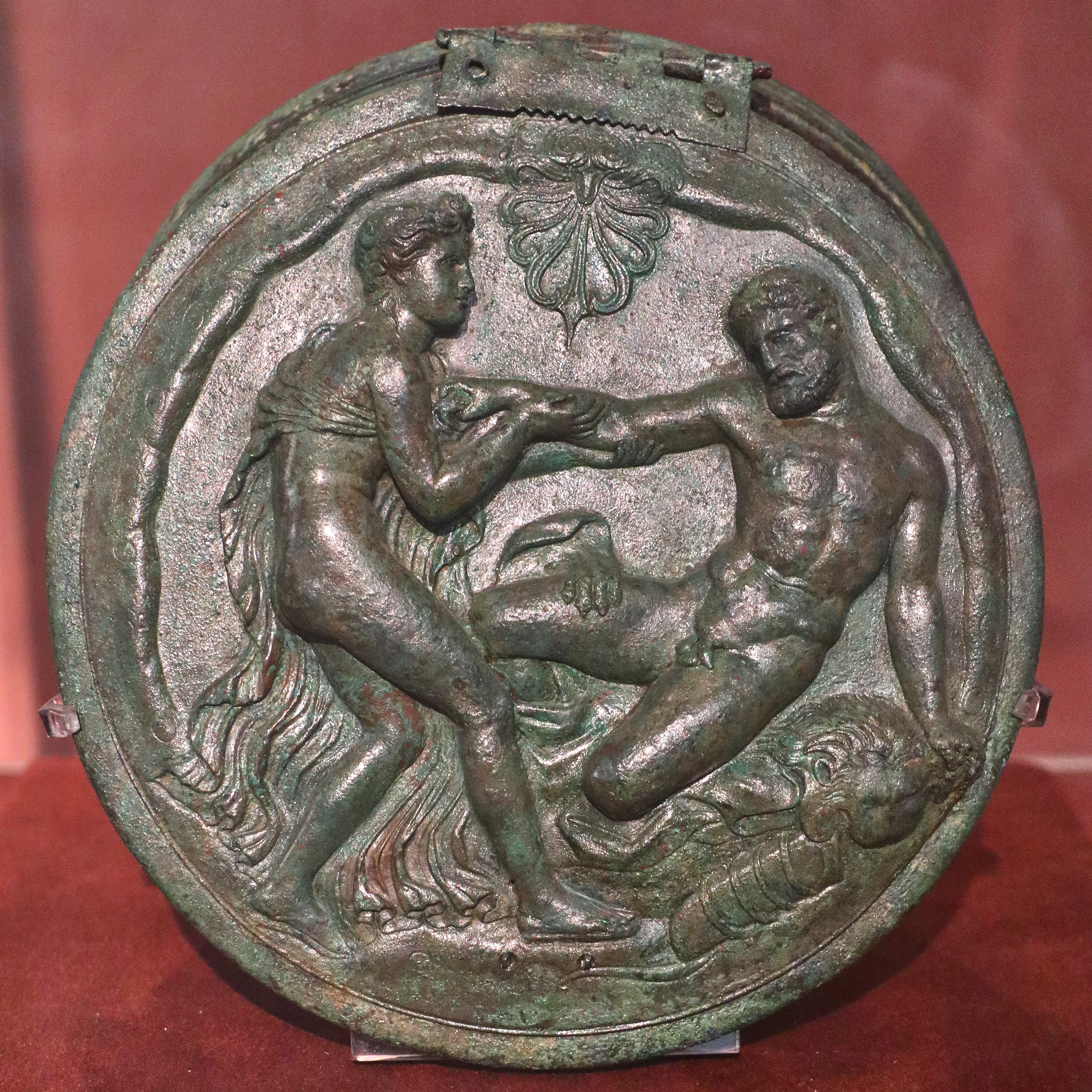
Ancient Greek fleuron as an anthemion on a mirror with cover, bronze, c.340 BC, bronze, National Archaeological Museum, Athens

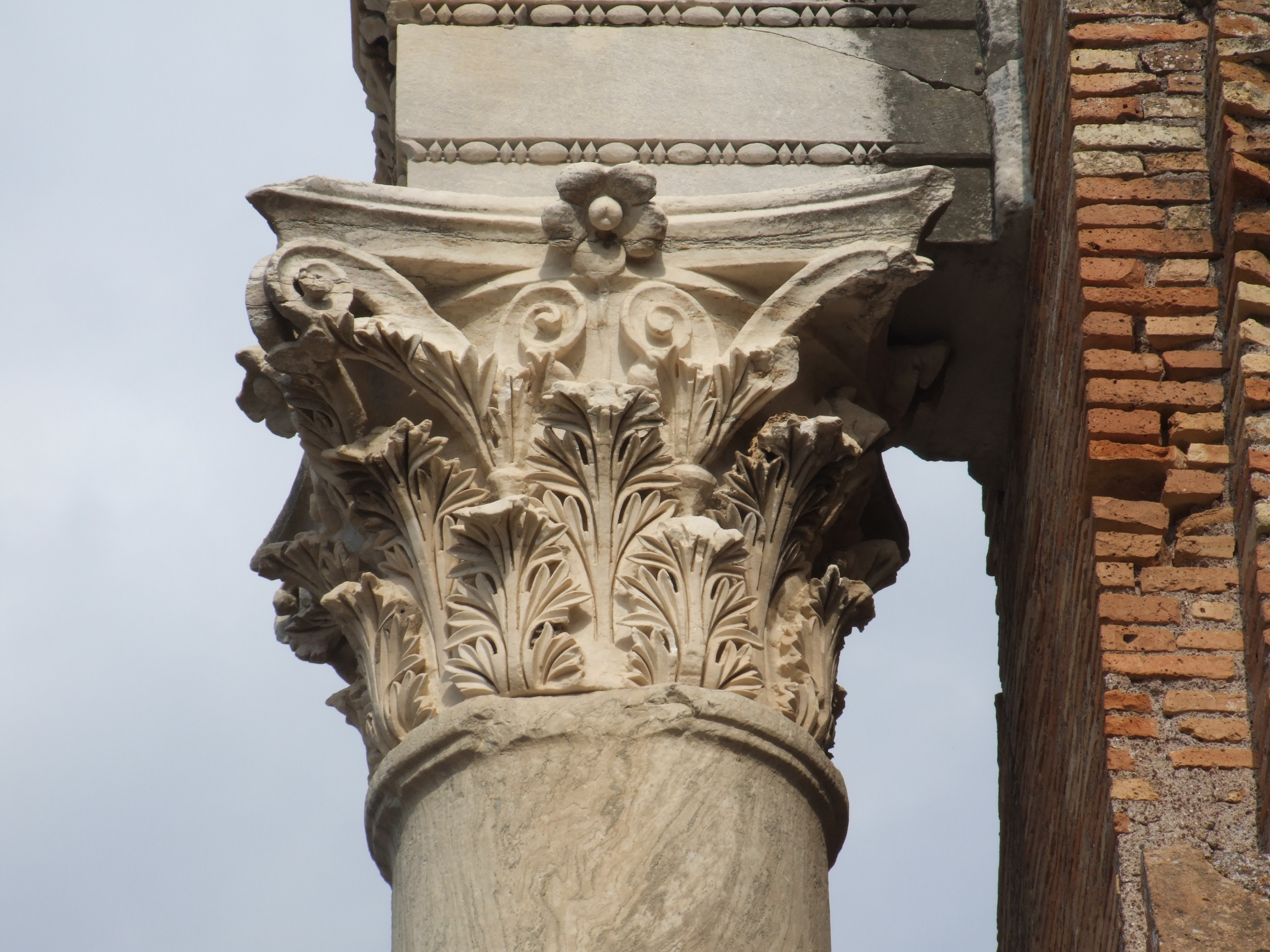
Roman Corinthian capital with a fleuron on the abacus of the Baths at Ostia, Ostia Antica, near modern Ostia, southwest of Rome, unknown architect, unknown date

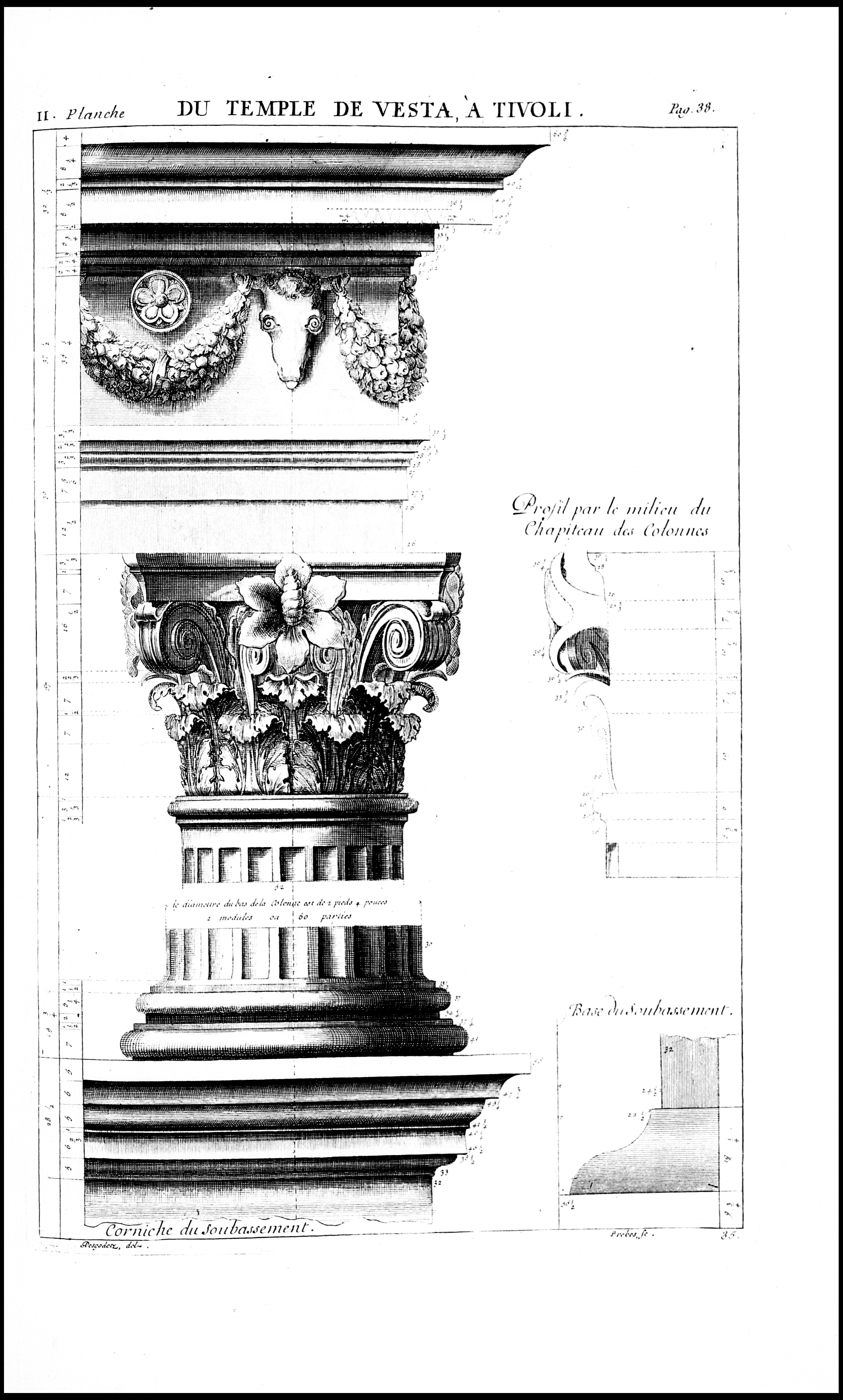
Roman Corinthian capital of the Temple of Vesta, Tivoli, Italy, with an oversized fleuron on the abacus, probably a stylized hibiscus blossom with spiral pistil, unknown architect, 1st century BC

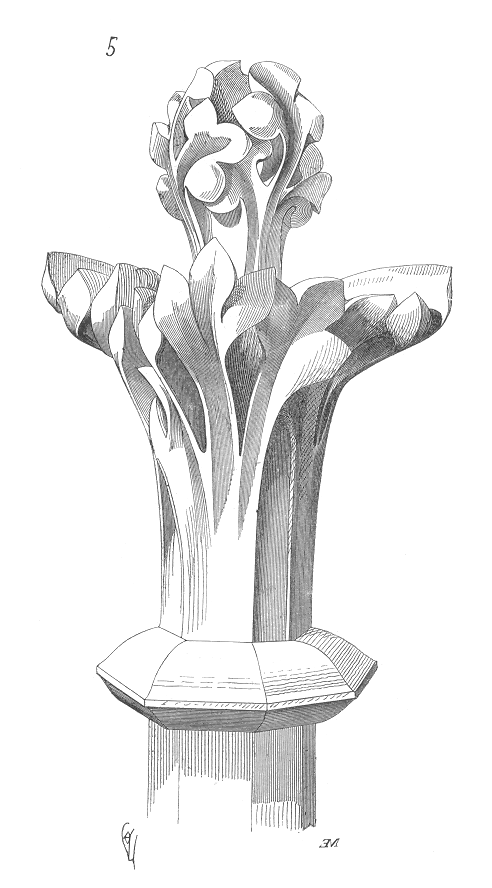
Gothic fleuron with a square section of a tier of four leaves or petals developing around a prominent central bud, early 13th century, illustration from the Dictionary of French architecture from the 11th to the 16th century by Eugène Viollet-le-Duc

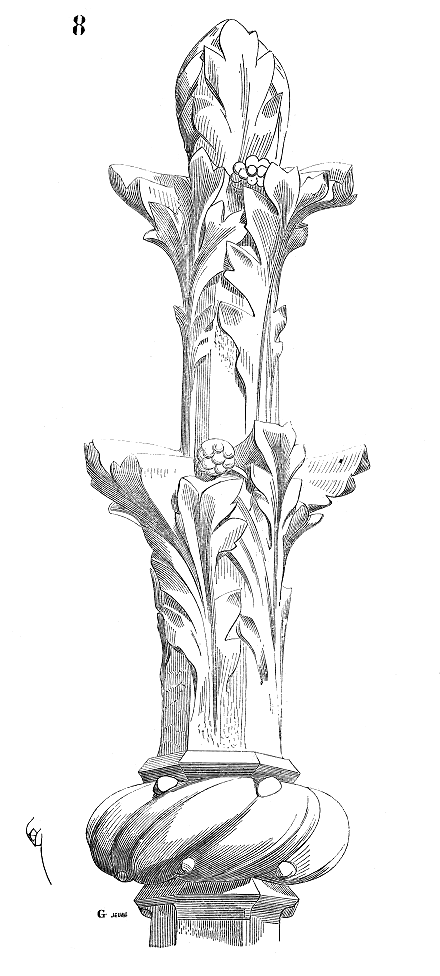
Gothic fleuron with two rays of foliage, mid-13th century, illustration from the Dictionary of French architecture from the 11th to the 16th century

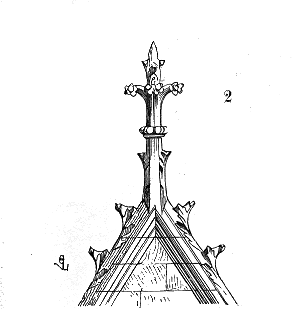
Gothic fleuron, 13th century, illustration from the Dictionary of French architecture from the 11th to the 16th century

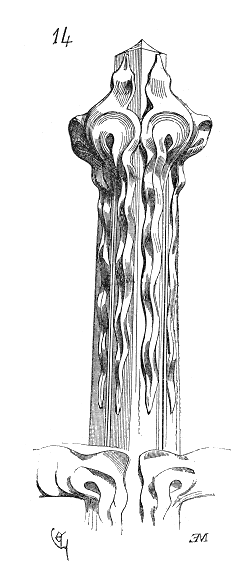
Gothic fleuron with stripped of foliage, 15th century, illustration from the Dictionary of French architecture from the 11th to the 16th century

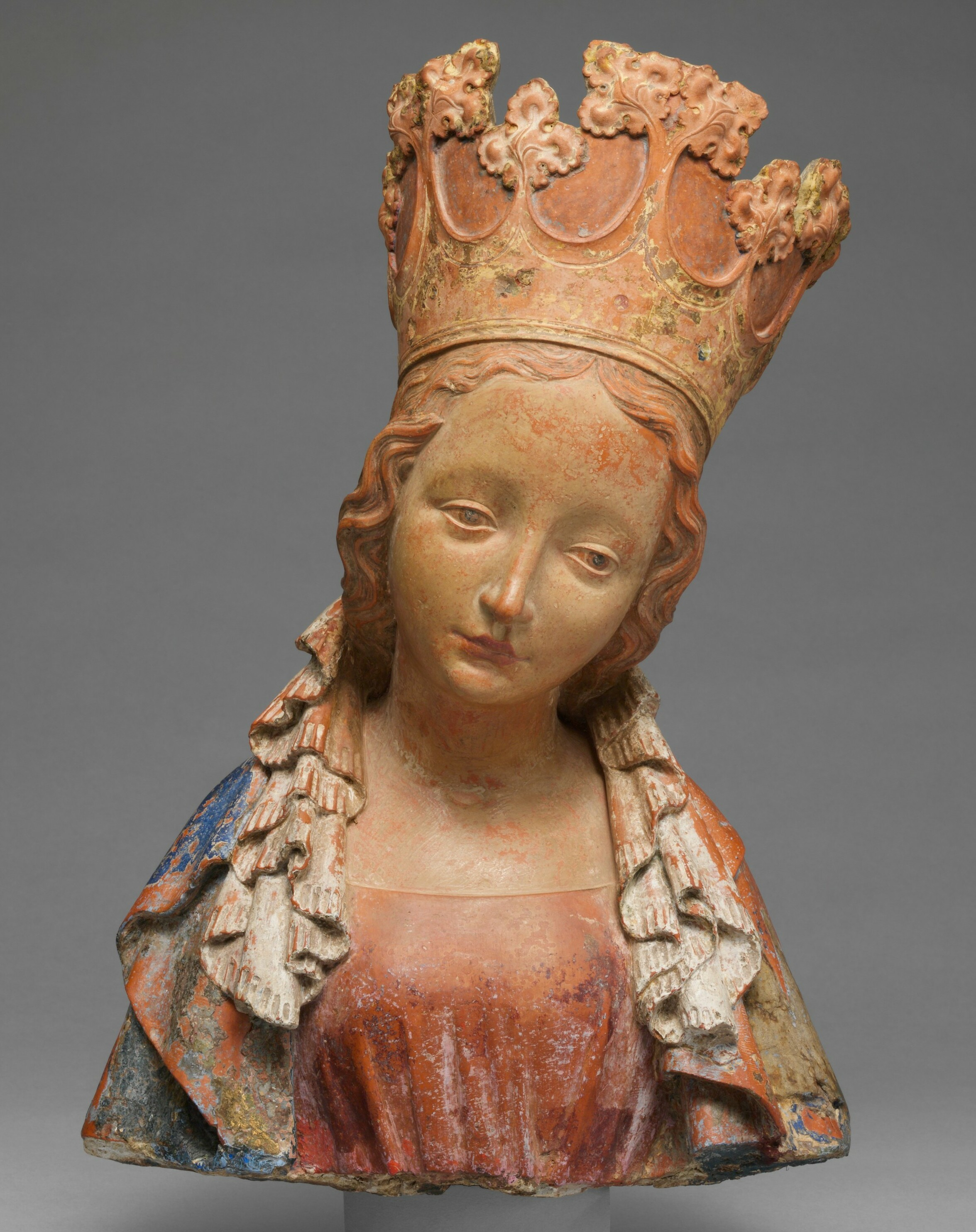
Gothic fleurons on a crown of the Virgin, c.1390-1395, terracotta with paint, Metropolitan Museum of Art

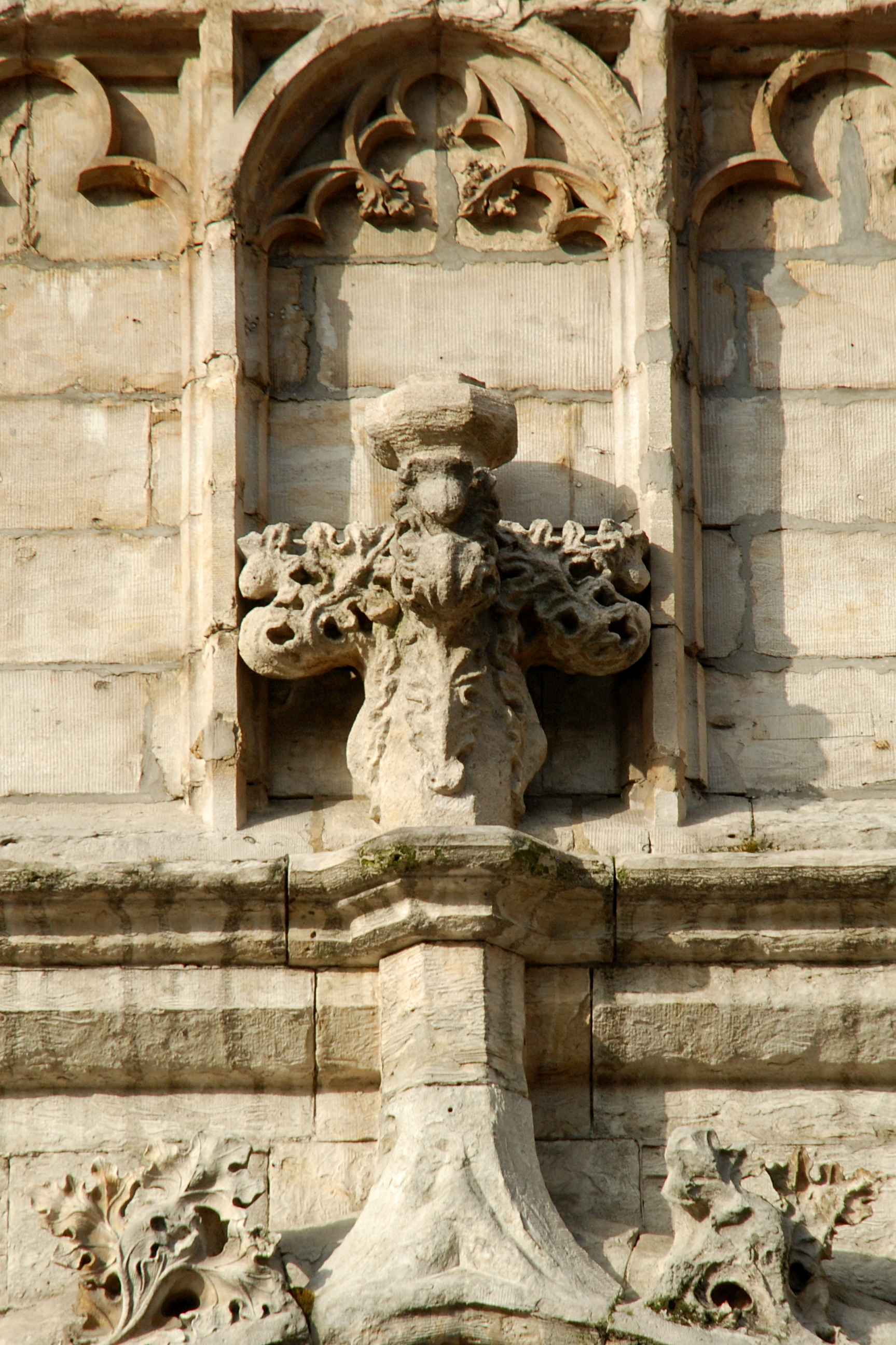
Gothic fleuron on the Brussels Town Hall, Belgium, by Jean Bornoy, Jacob van Thienen or Jan van Ruysbroeck, 1401-1455

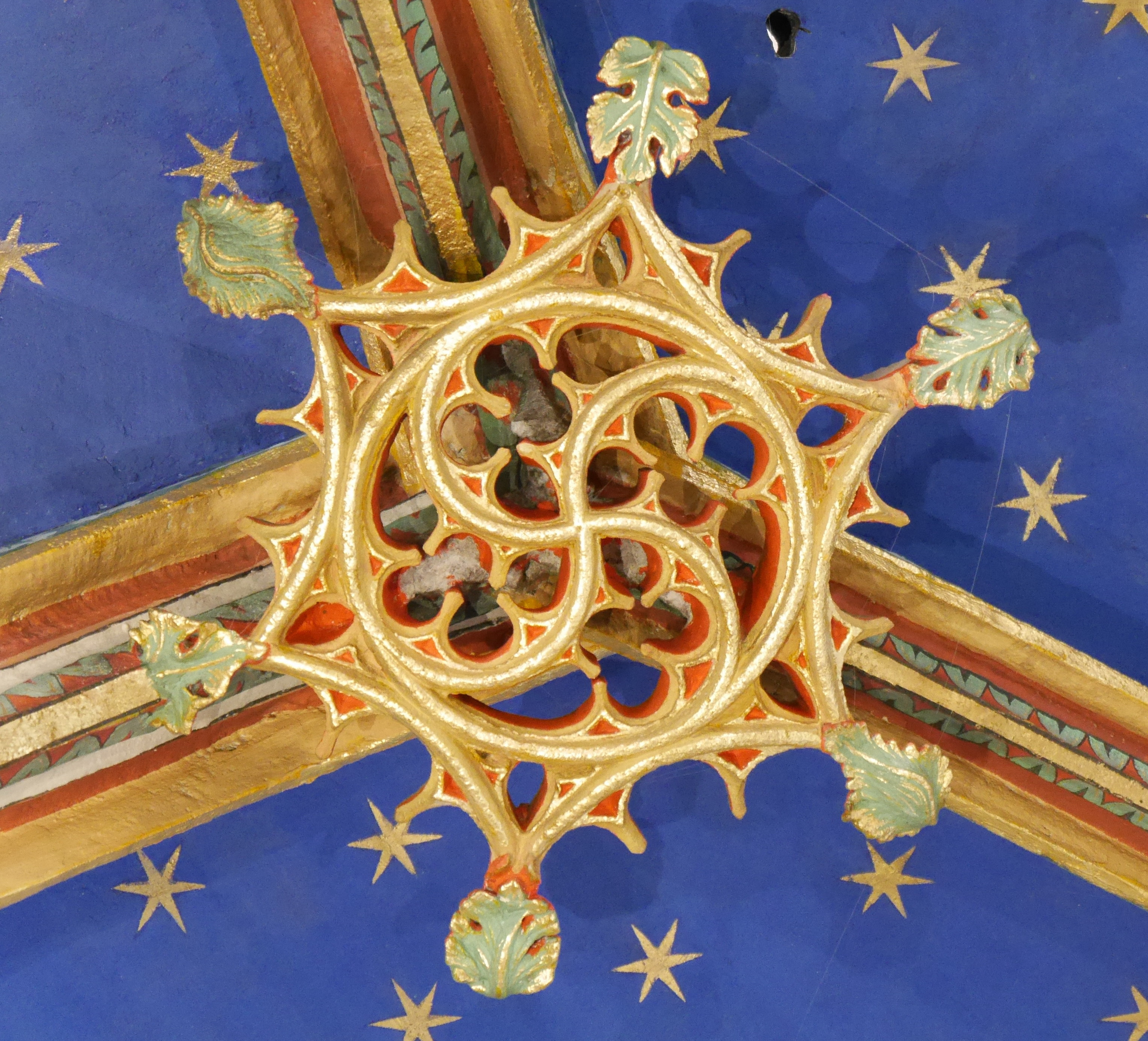
Gothic fleurons in the Chapelle de Condat, Libourne, unknown architect, probably the 15th century and restored in the 1860s

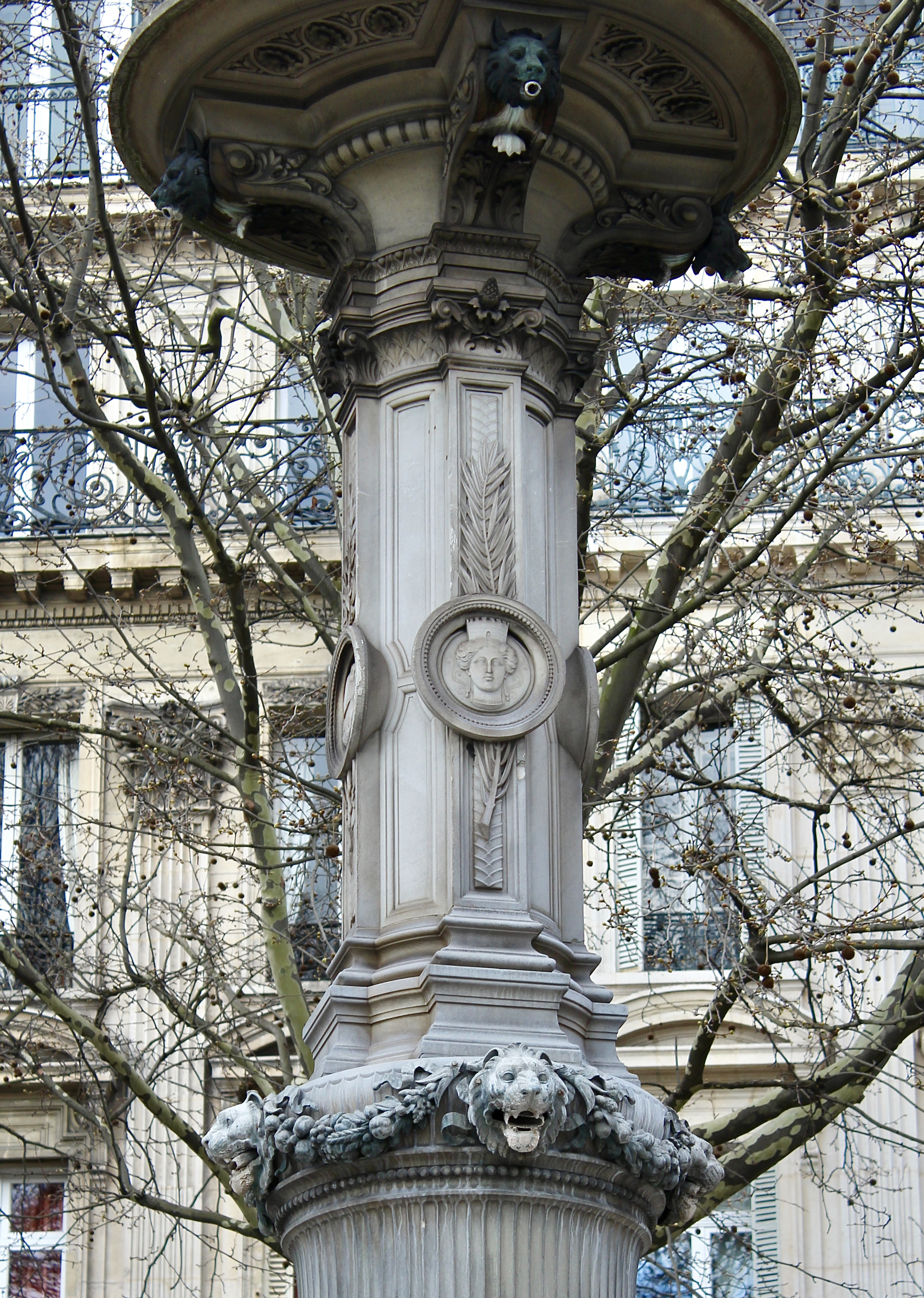
Neoclassical fleuron on the capital of a Corinthian pilaster of the Fontaines du Théâtre-Français, Paris, designed by Gabriel Davioud and sculpted by François Théophile Murgey, 1867-1874

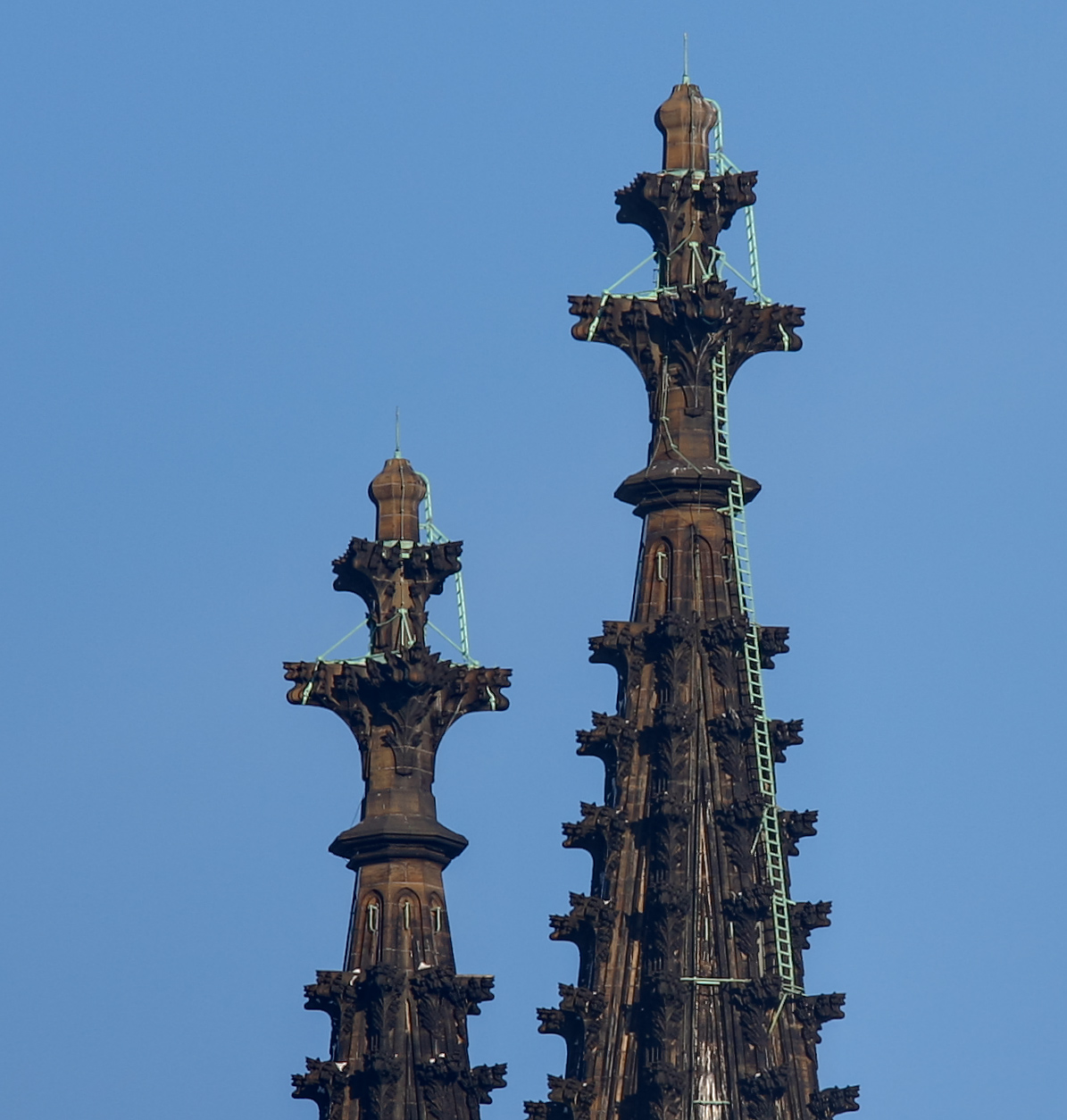
Gothic Revival fleurons from the finials of Cologne Cathedral, Cologne, Germany, by Ernst Friedrich Zwirner, c.1880

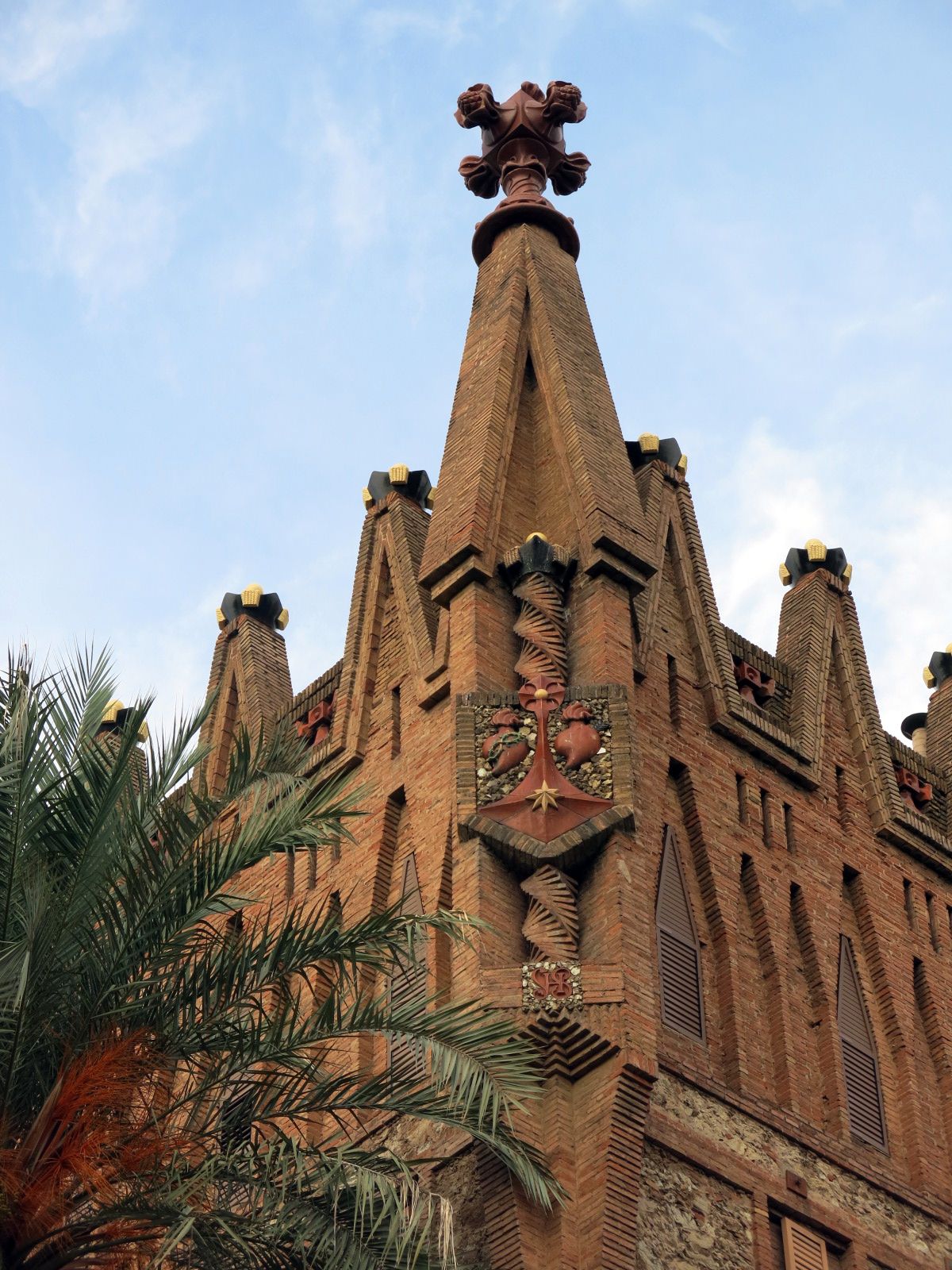
Gothic Revival reinterpretation of a fleuron on the College of Saint Teresa-Ganduxer, Barcelona, Spain, by Antoni Gaudí i Cornet and Joan Baptista Pons i Trabal, 1887-1889

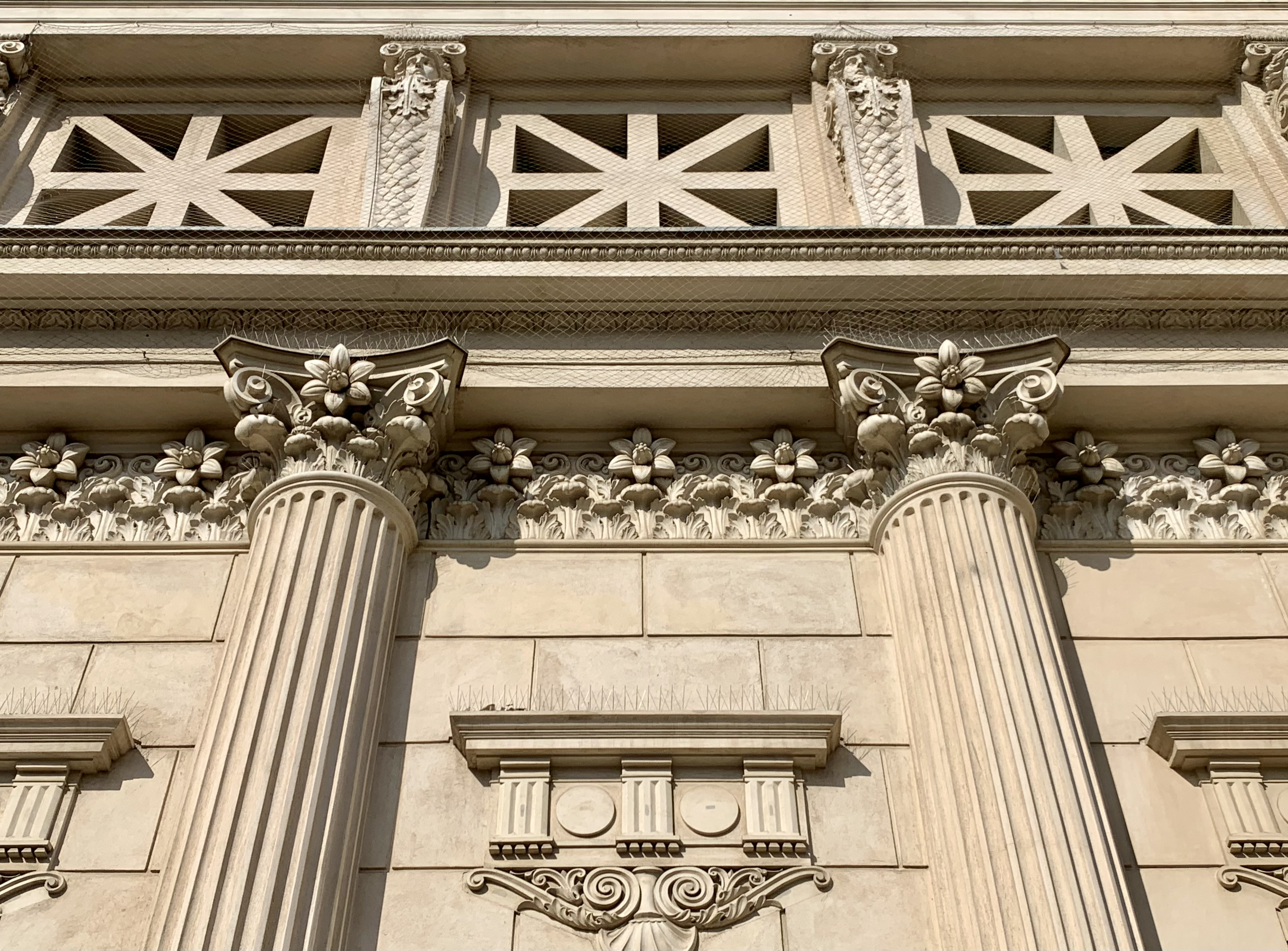
Oversized Neoclassical fleurons on the Romanian Atheneum, Bucharest, Romania, inspired by those of the Temple of Vesta in Tivoli, by Paul Louis Albert Galeron, 1888

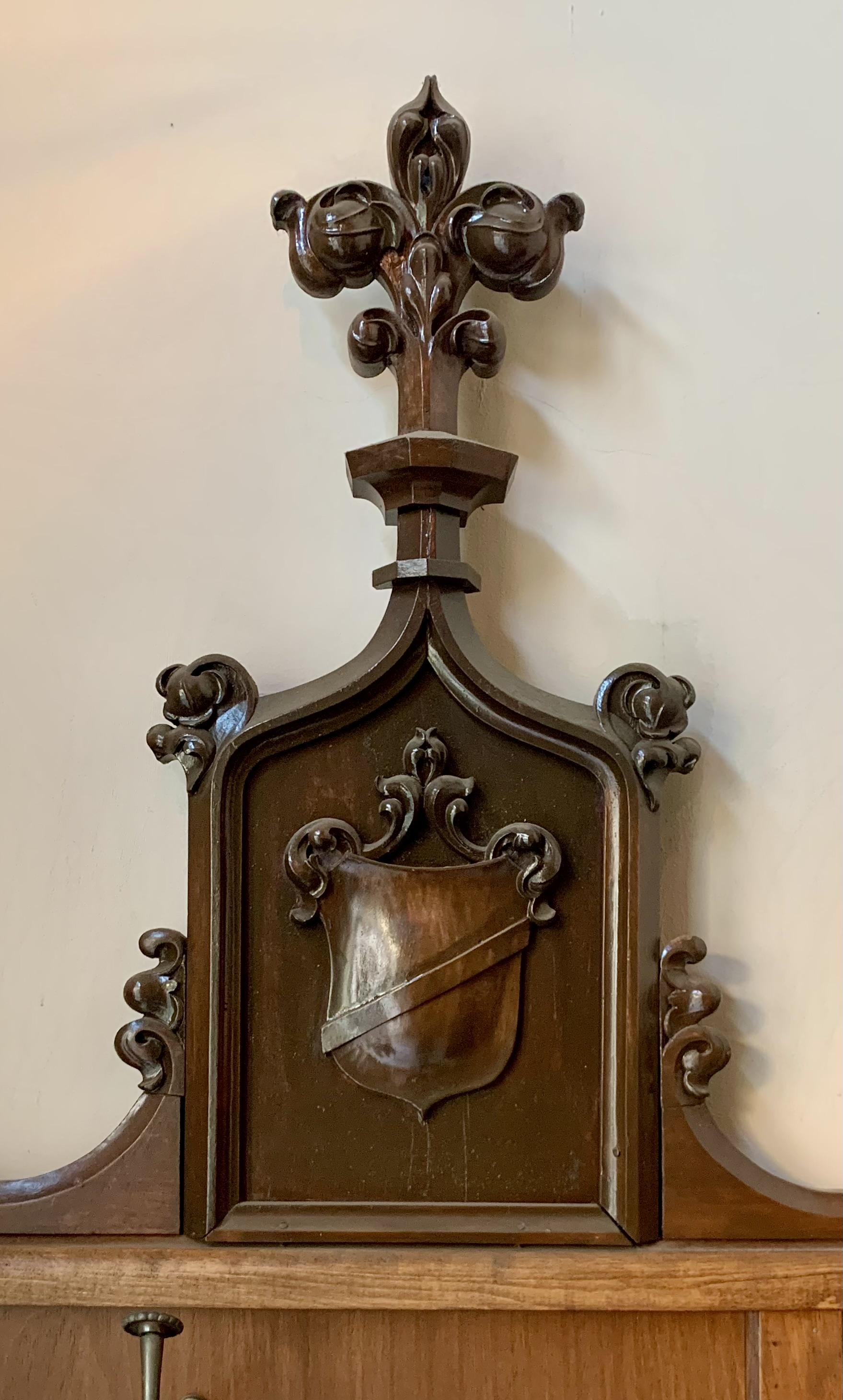
Gothic Revival fleuron in the George Severeanu Museum, Bucharest, unknown architect, c.1900

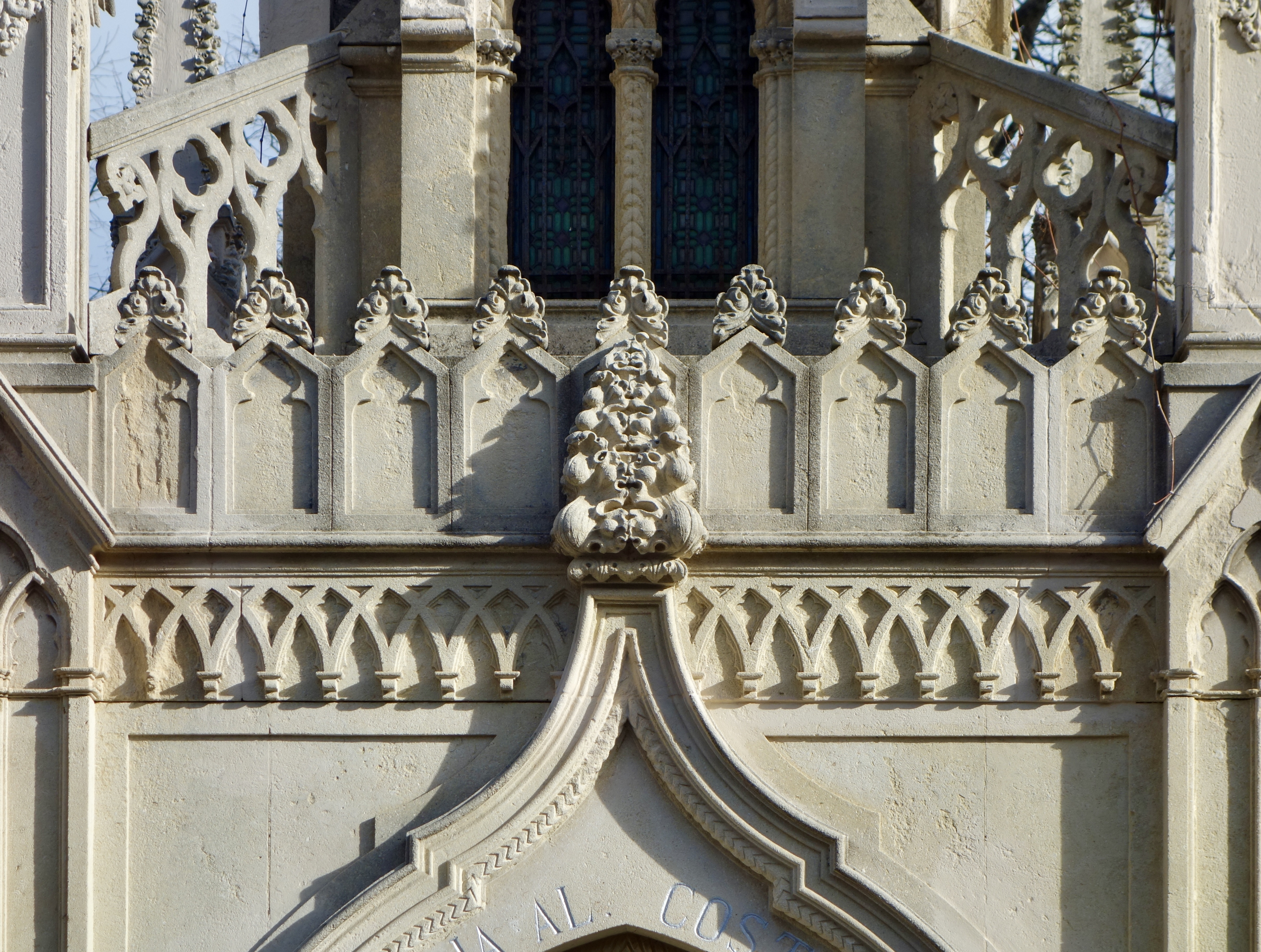
Gothic Revival fleurons on the Grave of the Alexandru Costescu Family in the Bellu Cemetery, Bucharest, unknown architect, c.1900

Typography fleurons

== See also ==
- Flamboyant
