= Macroglossum tangalleum =

Scientific classification
- Kingdom: Animalia
- Phylum: Arthropoda
- Class: Insecta
- Order: Lepidoptera
- Family: Sphingidae
- Genus: Macroglossum
- Species: M. tangalleum

Binomial name
- Macroglossum tangalleum Eitschberger & Schnitzler, 2006

Species of moth

Macroglossum tangalleum is a moth of the family Sphingidae which is endemic to Sri Lanka.

The wingspan is 54.5 millimetres (2.15 in) for males and 50.7 mm for females.
