= Taubenbrunnen =

Fountain in Cologne

The Taubenbrunnen is a fountain sculpture designed by Ewald Mataré and erected in 1953 in the Altstadt-Nord district of Cologne, situated directly in front of the west side of the Cologne Cathedral (cf. Domplatte).

== Origin and inauguration ==
The sculptor Mataré designed the fountain as early as 1950 as a drinking opportunity for the "cathedral pigeons" on the station forecourt. It was the first newly built fountain in Cologne after the Second World War and the city's first abstract fountain. It was financed by a foundation of the Bank für Gemeinwirtschaft in Cologne, which eventually also influenced the final location: in front of the bank building on Domplatz (now Domforum), completed in 1953.

The total cost of the fountain was 16,730 DM; die Metallarbeiten wurden durch die Gießerei Franz Schwarz in Düsseldorf ausgeführt.

At the end of July 1953, the foundation stone was laid and an "unknown dove" (made of marzipan) was sunk into the ground. At the inauguration on 4 August - a "small people's festival, a "compellingly uncelebratory celebration" or with Matarés Worten: "a delightful little happy affair" - people from culture, politics and banking were present, among others mayor Robert Görlinger, Josef Haubrich and Hermann Schnitzler. A document signed by all those present was sunk into the base of the fountain, which Mataré read out: "[...] that in these rushing, hurried times, the pigeons, nesting on the towers of our cathedral, are remembered [...]". The artist recalled in his diary:

A musician played the first verse of La Paloma, then the cover was removed from the mosaic floor, and when the first water had filled the small basin in three small jets and now took its spiral path in the large bowl, the second and third verses sounded while a bottle of Steinhäger went from mouth to mouth, perhaps 50 people surrounded the fountain. […].

— Ewald Mataré, Tagebücher

According to consistent information from several reports, no doves - understood at that time primarily as a symbol of peace - appeared at the celebration.

== Location and history ==
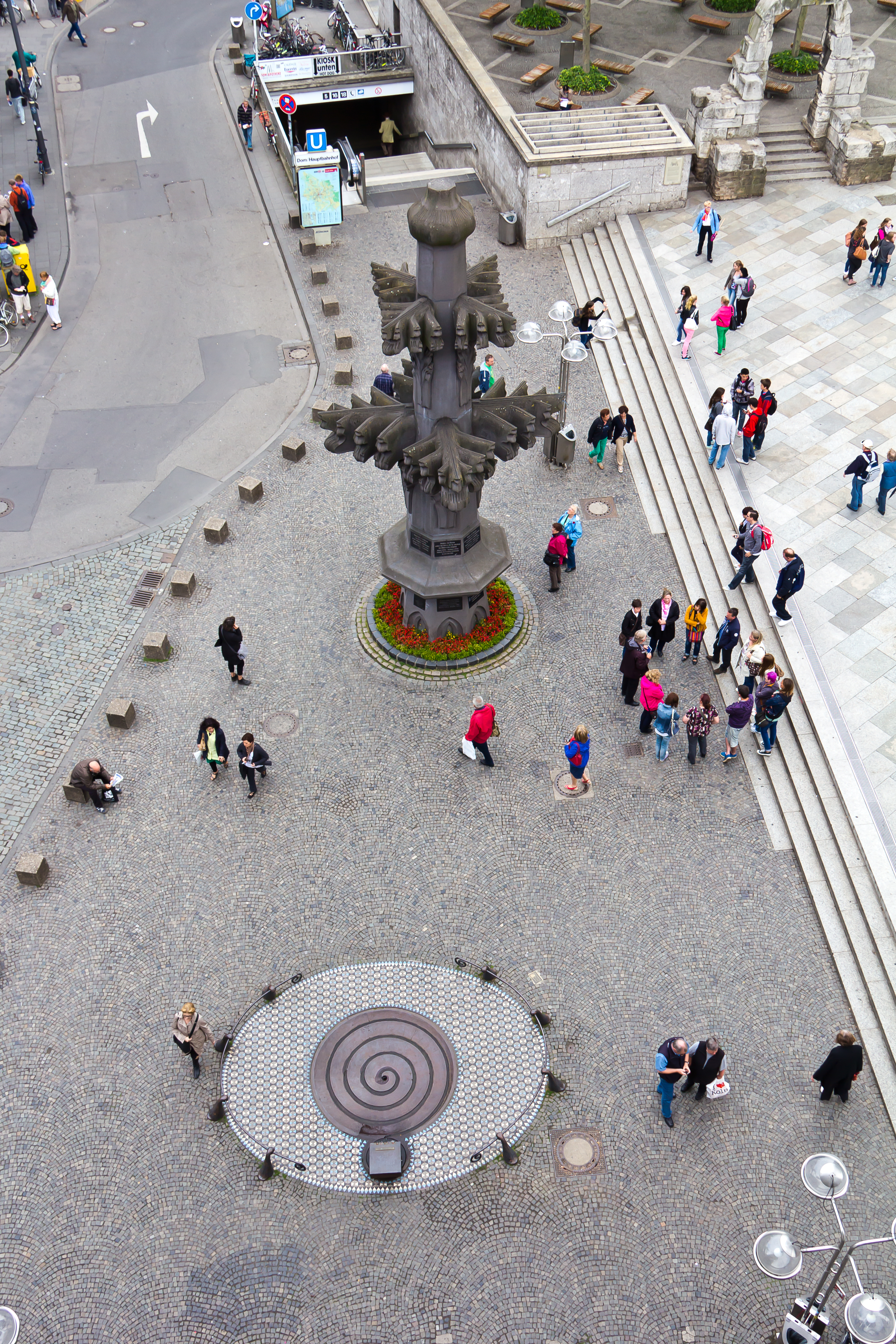
Location on Kardinal-Höffner-Platz, seen from the Domforum. On the right the Domplatte

The location of the fountain was historically called either Unter Fettenhennen or "in front of the house Domkloster3" (today "Domforum"); Sometimes the designation Am Domkloster or Domplatz is also found.

Since the area between Unter Fettenhennen to Trankgasse in front of the Domplattentreppe in 2008 has been given its own name is the address Kardinal-Höffner-Platz.

Originally, the fountain was intended for the station forecourt, was then placed on the edge of the square in front of the cathedral, however, because the square in front of the station - according to a diary entry by Mataré - did not belong to the city but to the railway. The chosen location then corresponded to the wishes of the founder, the Bank für Gemeinwirtschaft. Mataré continues:

The objection that the pigeons will not settle there so easily because they are constantly fed in front of the station was not heeded. Well, it remains to be seen. The dogs at least have a drinking pool now, this is the small one and the 3 thin rays, and if no pigeons should come, then certainly the sparrows, even the people, as I heard, cool their foreheads there with moistened handkerchiefs in these hot days.

— Ewald Mataré

At that time, the cathedral forecourt was still completely at street level, so that the cathedral portals could only be reached via a staircase closer to the cathedral than today. Since the construction of the Domplatte and the Domparkhaus below it in 1970, the fountain has been located directly in front of the stairs. Because of this and because of the concrete copy of the Finials of Cologne Cathedral, which is only a few metres away and over 10 metres high, the deliberately restrained design of the fountain recedes into the background and is overlooked by many passers-by.

Video

In the discussion about a "de-cluttering" of the urban space - intensified from 2012 onwards - the Dove Fountain played a role insofar as the dominance of the objects in its immediate vicinity was criticised - not only the crucifix replica, but also the "conglomerate" created by "50 bollards, [...] four different lamps, [...] rubbish bins" at this location. The relocation of the crucifix to another place was to be a first step towards making the fountain visible again. The city administration postponed the decision on this until the planned renewal of the cathedral surroundings.

== Description ==
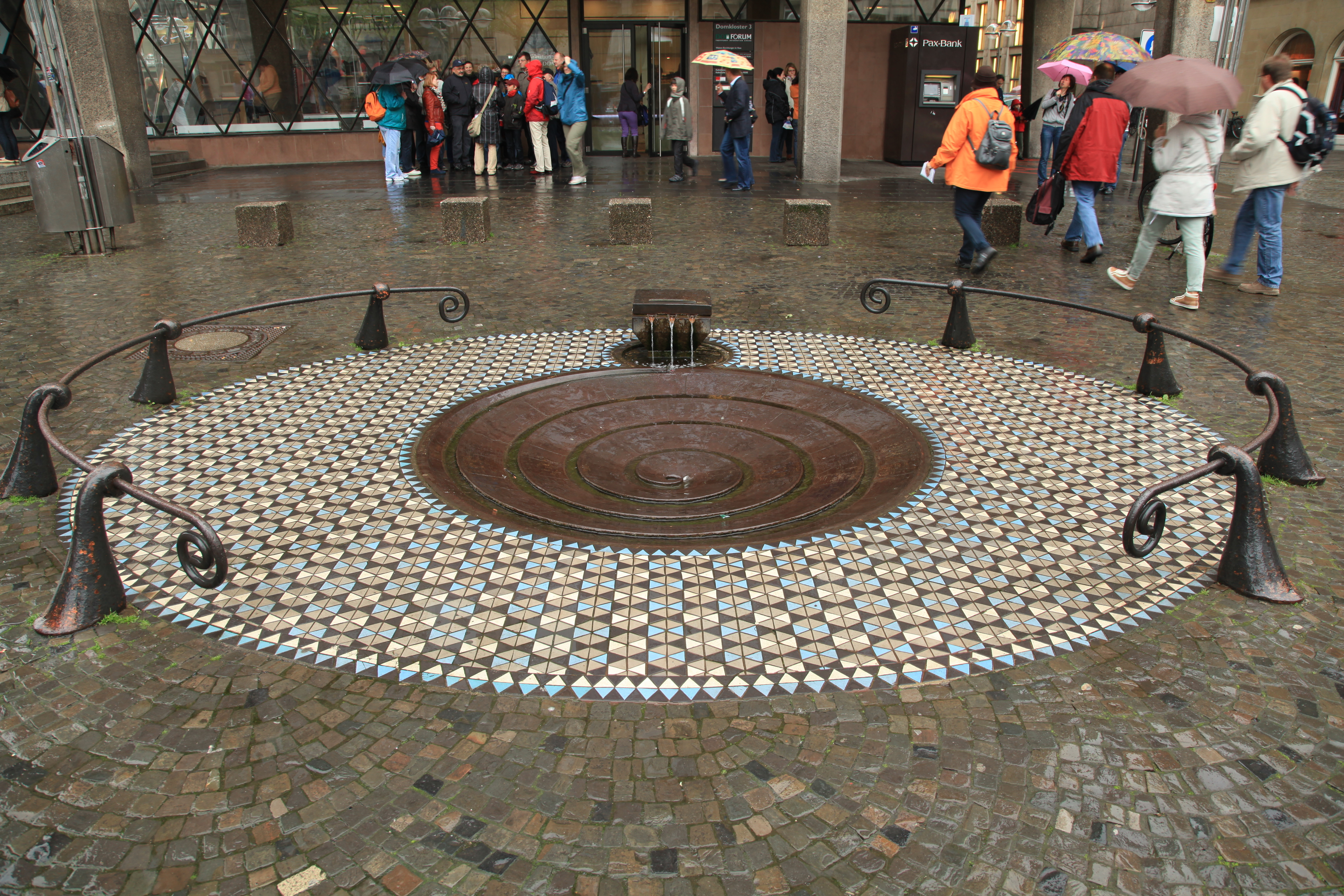
Dove fountain from the front

In an oval, 540 × 400 cm mosaic field, enclosed on two sides by a 45 cm high enclosure of curved iron bars, lies a circular iron trough of about 2.20 m diameter with a watercourse spiralling towards the centre. At the rear of the fountain, a small circular basin is set into the mosaic border, adjacent to the central metal trough, with the water dispenser rising from the centre.

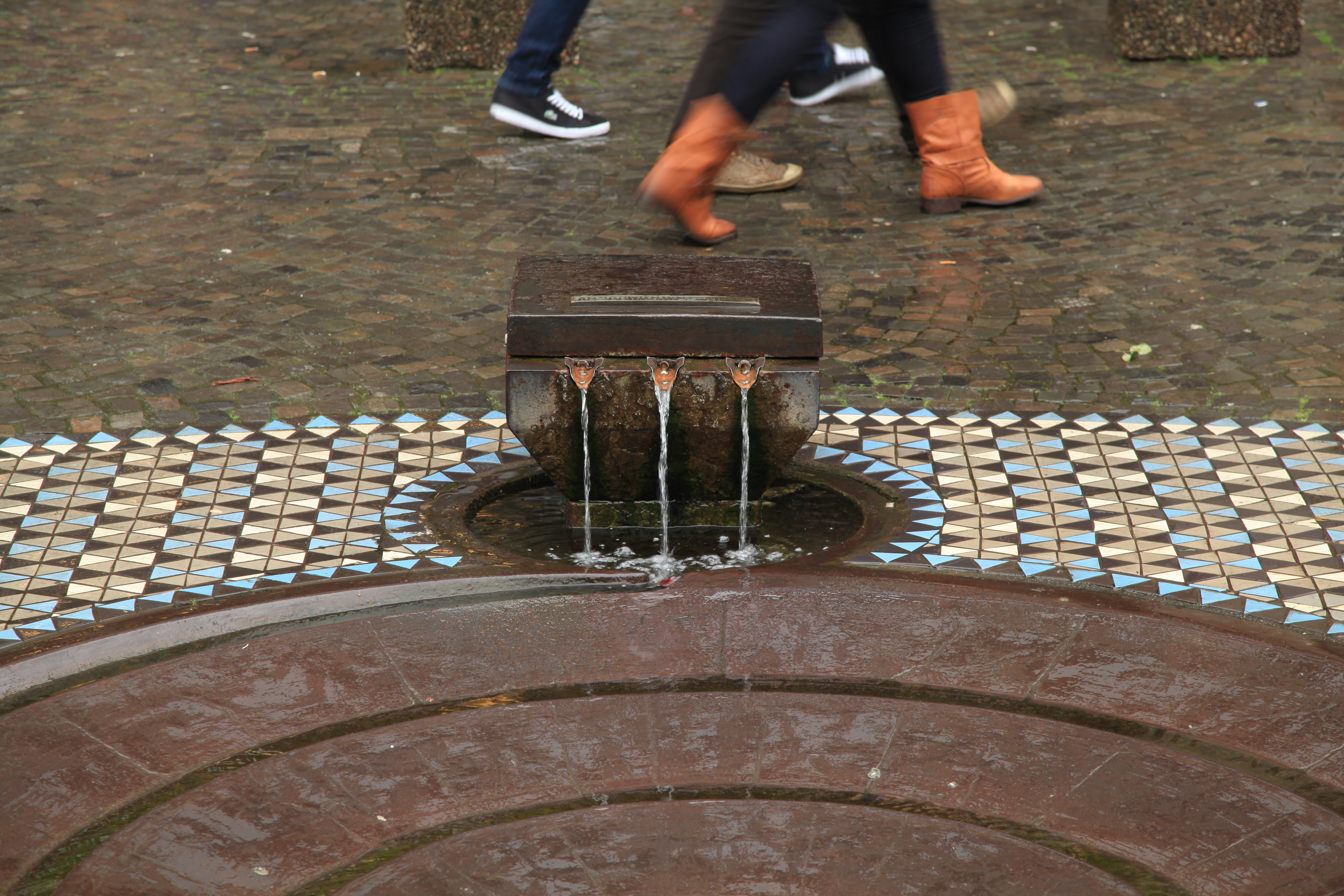
Water dispenser

The metal water dispenser, about the same height as the enclosure, sits on a square basalt block. This has the shape of an inverted square truncated pyramid, which merges into a square cuboid at the top. From there, the water flows from three small outlets or spouts into the watercourse spiral and on to the drain in the centre of the fountain. The upper cover of the water dispenser is a metal lid that recedes slightly behind the water outlets.

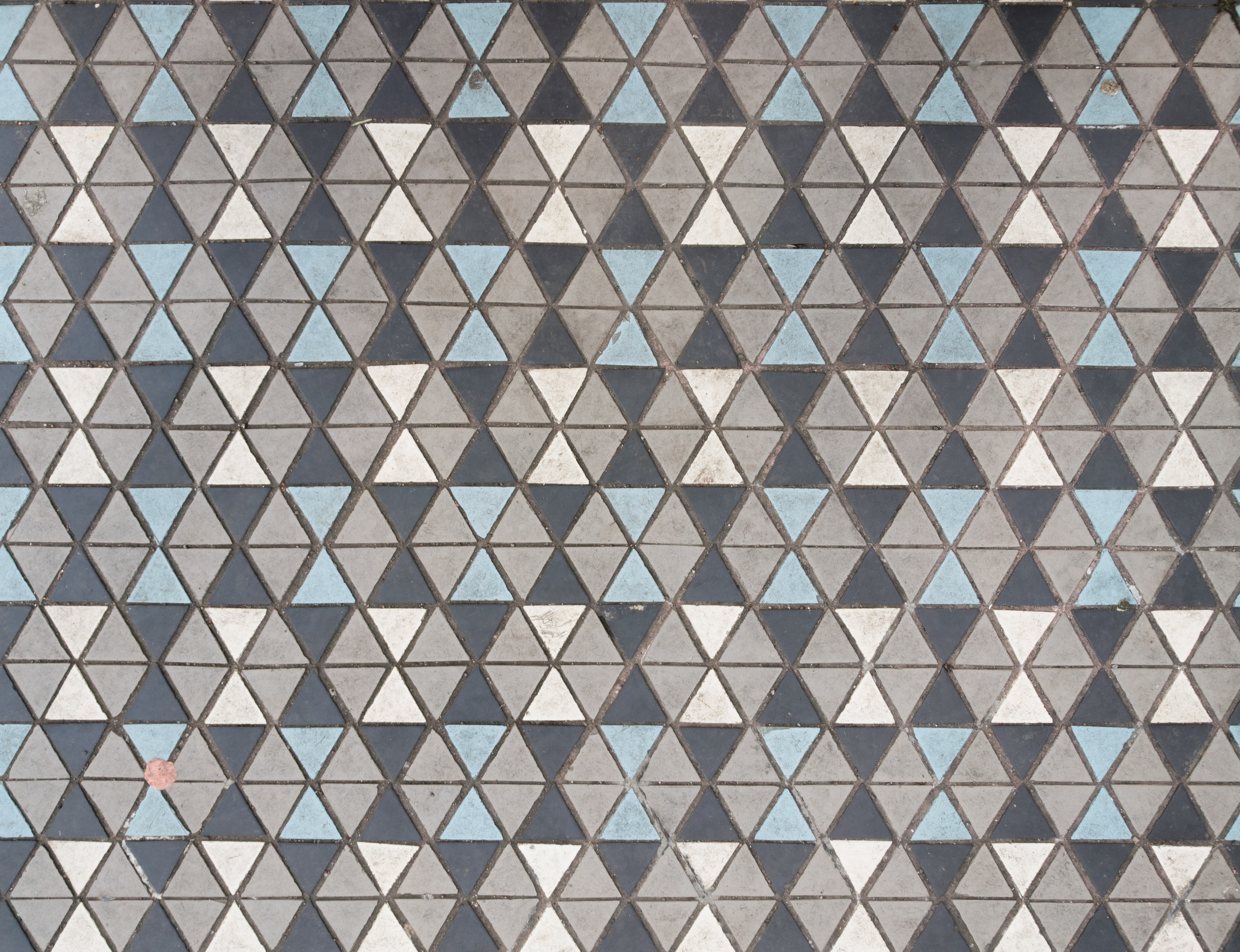
Mosaic pattern

The mosaic field is composed of equilateral tile triangles in four different colours - blue, white, grey, black. They are arranged so that the lighter colours visually form hexagons. The mosaic field is framed by a border of white and blue triangles. The strictly geometric mosaic pattern contrasts with the soft, round shapes of the watercourse and the railing.

To the left of the fountain is a plaque embedded in the ground with the following inscription:

EWALD MATARÉ
1887 - 1965

TAUBENBRUNNEN
1953

Bank für Gemeinwirtschaft, Köln 1953.

On the back of the water dispenser is the inscription GEGOSSEN BEI FRANZ SCHWARZ DUESSELDORF 1953. On the top of the water dispenser is a metal sign "No drinking water".

== Artistic classification ==
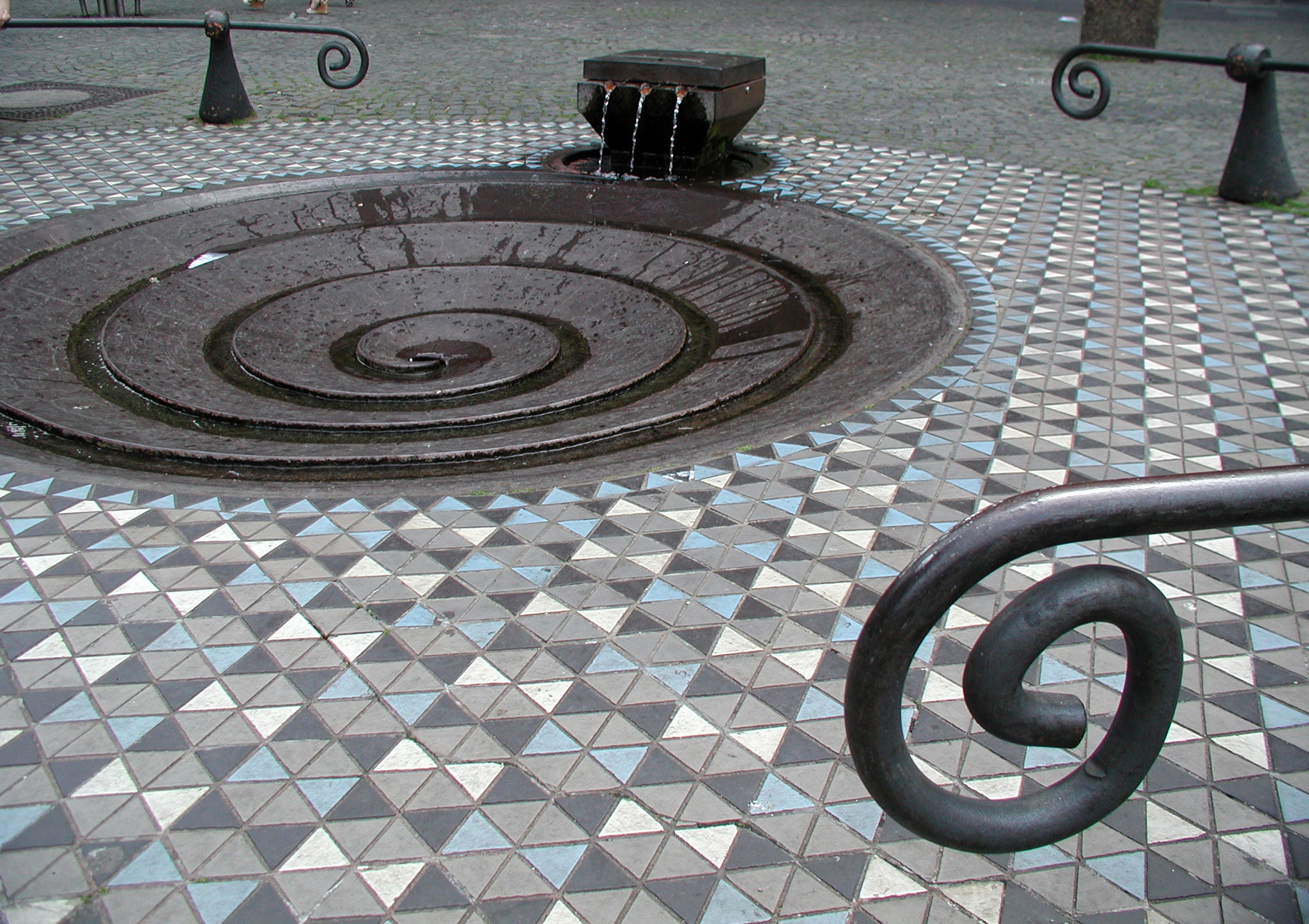
Design details

Mataré returned to work as a professor at the Kunstakademie Düsseldorf in 1946, after he had been dismissed from his teaching post as a so-called "degenerate artist" during the National Socialist era. During this time, however, he produced works for ecclesiastical clients, also in Cologne. In 1947 he then designed the new doors for the south portal of Cologne Cathedral, in 1955 the Stefan Lochner Fountain in the inner courtyard of the Museum of Applied Arts, in 1956 the doors of the new Gürzenich.

The aesthetic of the Dove Fountain in its "expressive simplicity" fits seamlessly into Mataré's works from this period. Round forms and a withdrawn and delicate aesthetic, as they characterised the 1950s, can on the one hand be seen as a contrast to the Bauhaus style, but are on the other hand also typical of the dainty and small-scale decorations of this time, which formed a conscious contrast to the monumentality during the period of National Socialism.

The art historian Gerhard Kolberg ranks the fountain among the works characterised by the artist's love of animals and points to the symbolism of the dove as a symbol of peace in destroyed Cologne. The art historian Anke von Heyl assesses the Dove Fountain as a "true masterpiece of aesthetic design" and emphasises the special aesthetics of the snail-shaped watercourse, the form of which is reflected in the volutes of the surrounding railing.

Further assessments from more recent times emphasise the delicacy and subtlety of the fountain sculpture or its "unparalleled elegance". The former Cologne monument conservator Hiltrud Kier, who was responsible for its protection, calls it "intimate".

== Conservation and monument protection ==
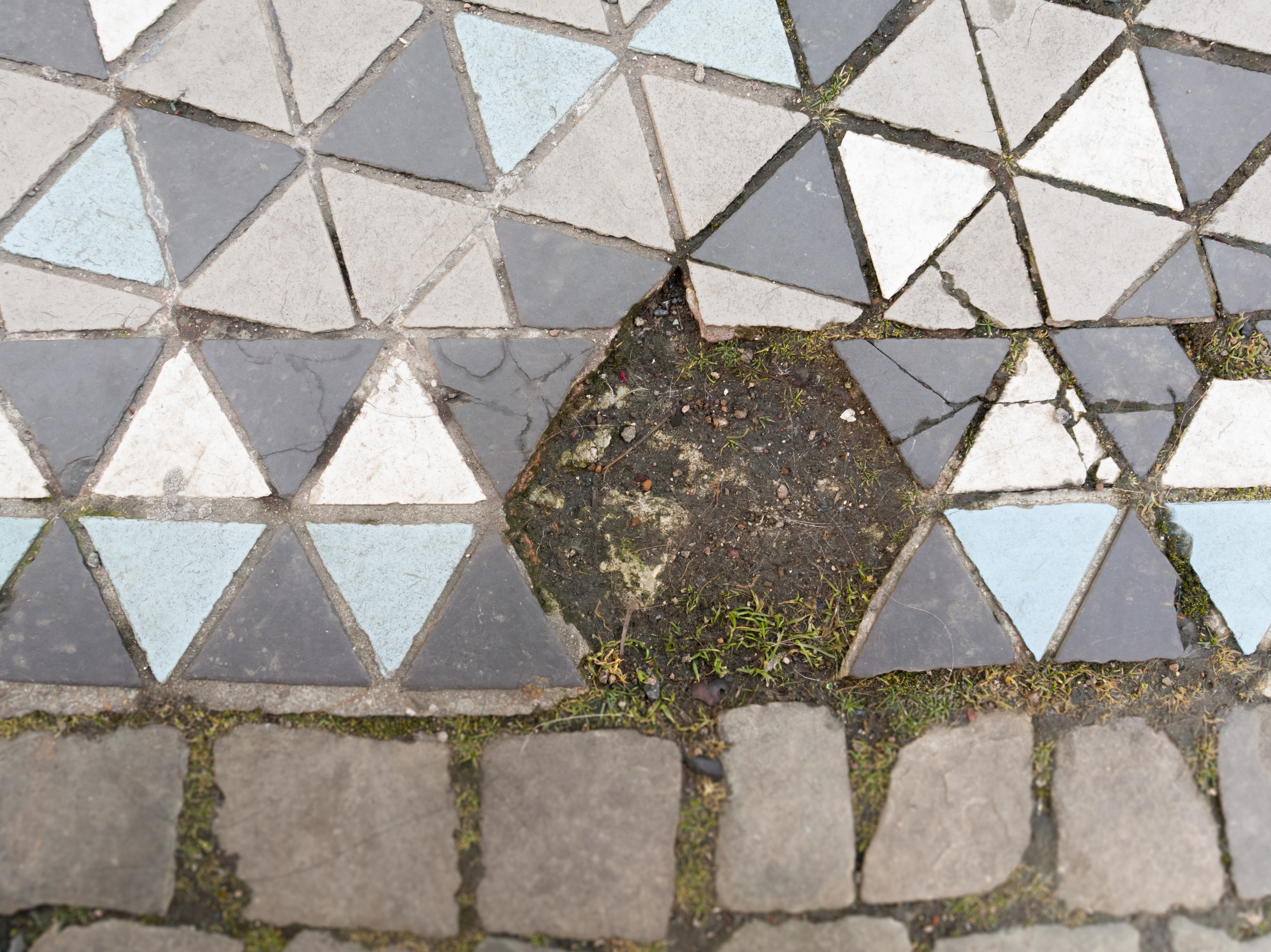
Typical mosaic deterioration (2017)

In May 1989, the Dove Fountain was added to the list of monuments of the City of Cologne under the number 4976.

Parts of the mosaic tiles in the Dove Fountain regularly come loose and then have to be repaired. In earlier repairs, the mosaic was renewed without blue stones - not in accordance with the original pattern. Since 2006, there has been an agreement between the office of the Stadtkonservator and the Kölner Dombauverwaltung, according to which the city provides the material and a craftsman from the Dombauhütte regularly carries out necessary repairs. In the process, the stonemason Markus Schroer again used a red mortar for the joints, like Mataré, and also gradually reconstructed the original pattern.

== Reception ==
The writer Hans Bender dedicated one of his four-line poems (Pigeon Fountain in front of Cologne Cathedral) in which he outlined the observation that the pigeons do not quench their thirst in the fountain designed for them, but in the neighbouring puddles.

In 1960, the city administration of Cologne began to take action against the increasing pigeon populations at the cathedral and other places in the city. In a heated debate between animal rights activists, private pigeon breeders, the city administration and the public health department about the method of pigeon control ten years after the establishment of the pigeon fountain, which was received beyond the city's borders as Aktion Blausäure (Action Hydrocyanic Acid), the Kölner Stadt-Anzeiger commented: "We already have a monument to the gassed animals: the pigeon fountain in front of the cathedral."
