= Finials of Cologne Cathedral =

Cologne cathedral architectural detail

Coordinates: 50°56′28″N 06°57′26″E

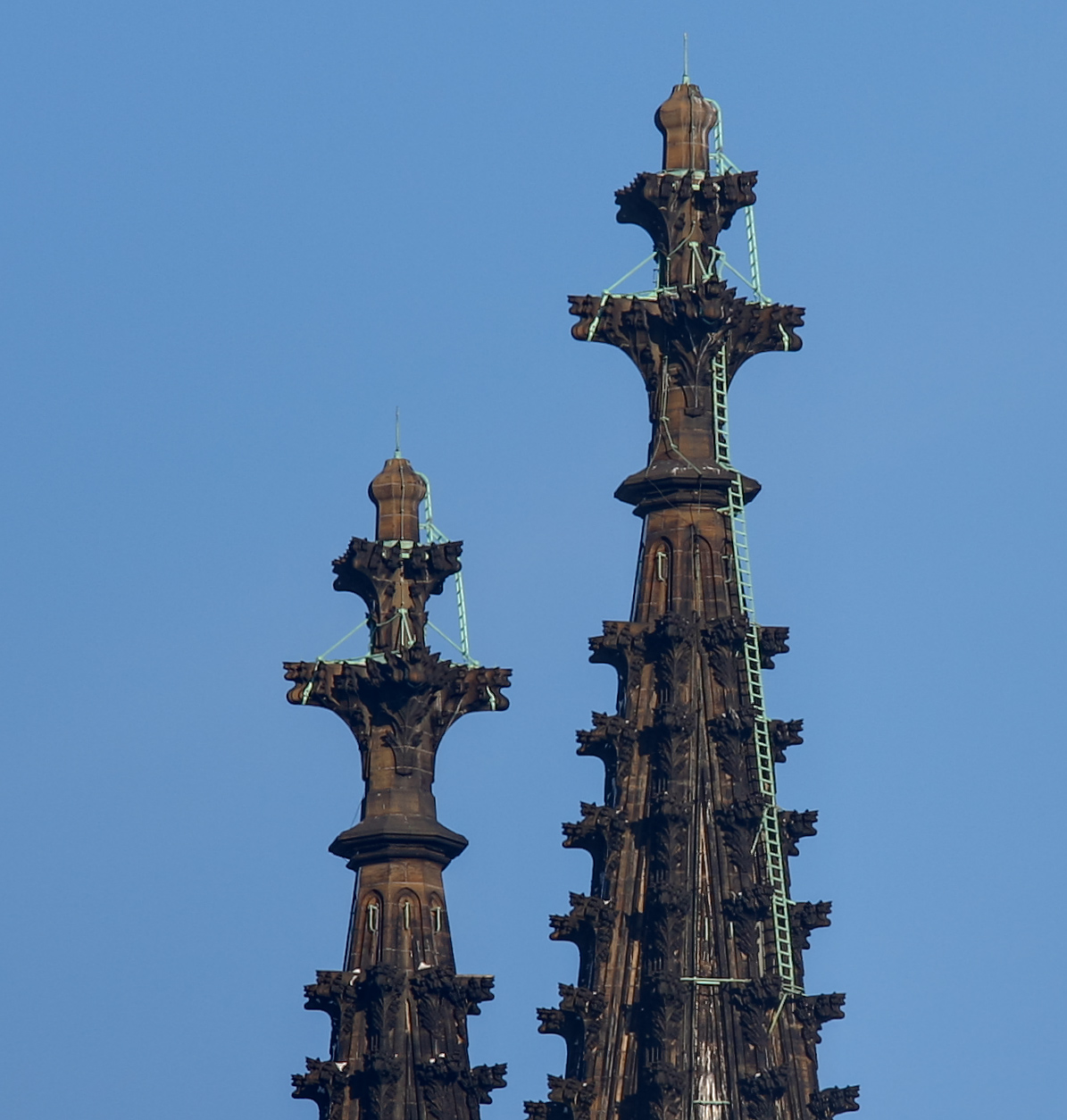
The finials with copper reinforcements and ladders, all with green patina

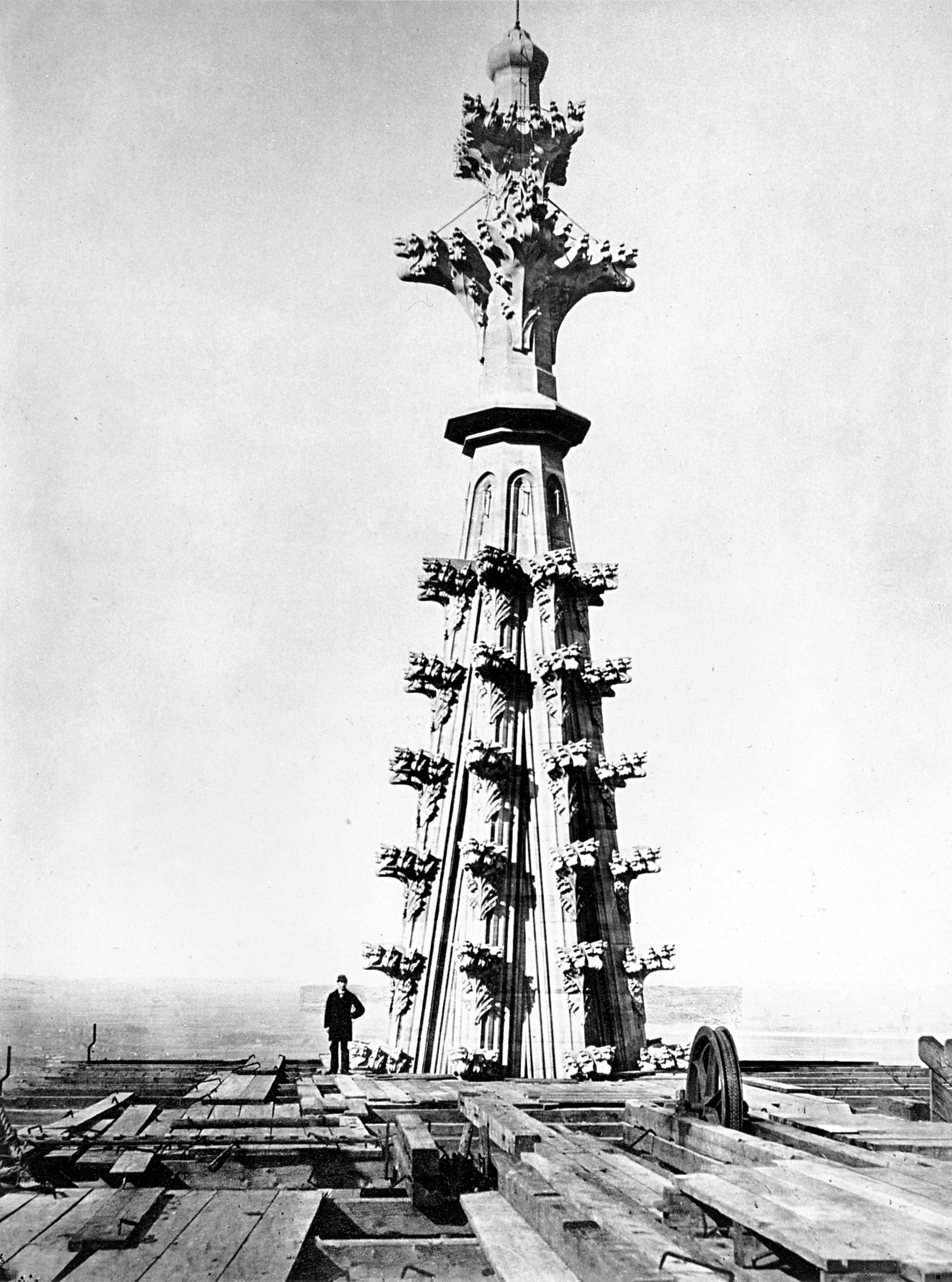
Top of the north tower of Cologne Cathedral (1881)

The finials of Cologne Cathedral form the tops of the two towers (north and south towers) at a height of 149 to 157 metres. A copy of this finial in original size, but made of concrete, has stood below the steps in front of the west façade of the cathedral since 1991.

== Shape and construction ==
The finials consist of a central shaft surrounded by two leaf wreaths of different sizes. They date from the last construction phase of Cologne Cathedral around 1880, although the plans still go back to master builder Ernst Friedrich Zwirner († 1861), who based his plans on the original, medieval façade plan F. In this design, the finials were to have a diameter of 5.20 metres.

Zwirner's successor as cathedral architect was Richard Voigtel, who is considered to have completed the cathedral. He was already planning a smaller diameter of initially 5.02 metres, later 4.75 metres, for the lower leaf wreath. The natural limitations of the material to be extracted from the Obernkirchen Sandstein finally tipped the scales: the final diameter of the lower leaf wreath is 4.58 metres, the height around eight metres.

In addition to the size of the stone blocks, transporting them to heights of over 150 metres posed a challenge in the 19th century: Not only were scaffolding and rope hoists too weak, but the steam-powered freight lift could carry a maximum weight of four tonnes. A one-piece lower leaf wreath alone would have weighed over 17 tonnes. This is one of the reasons why the finials, with their approximately 37 cubic metres of stone each, are made up of a total of 24 individual stones.

To stabilise the construction of the spire, a system of brackets and reinforcements, mostly made of copper, was developed to counter the danger of corrosion. The leaves of the lower ring of leaves, joined together in the middle on a comparatively small surface, project outwards up to 2.30. They are therefore supported on the one hand by stone brackets from below, but held in place on the top by an octagonal copper band on the shaft and by metal rods.

A wrought-iron rod 10 centimetres in diameter and 21 metres long was passed through the centre of the shaft to stabilise it with a copper sheath. This rod hangs downwards into the tower's spire and is weighted down in the manner of a pendulum.

Copper ladders lead from an exit about 17 metres below to the tops of the finials, where there is a lightning rod.

== Structure and modification ==
The finials were made in the winter of 1879/80 in the stonemasons' workshop of the cathedral building lodge; the raising and setting began on 16 July 1880, after the raising scaffolding had been reinforced as a precaution. For example, the hemp rope was replaced by steel cables.

The finial of the north tower was completed and put in place on 23 July 1880, that of the south tower on 14 August 1880 – but without the keystone, which was put in place to celebrate the completion of the cathedral on 15 October 1880.

Shortly after completion, however, the protests of the population increased, as the finials appeared too compact and bulky despite their removal. For this reason, it was decided shortly afterward to rework the leaf wreaths by hand.

In the winter of 1880/81, wooden housings were mounted around the finials to create a heated workspace for the workers in the cold. 40 stonemasons worked until 12 February 1881 to make the leaf wreaths more filigree afterward.

== Model on the Domplatte ==
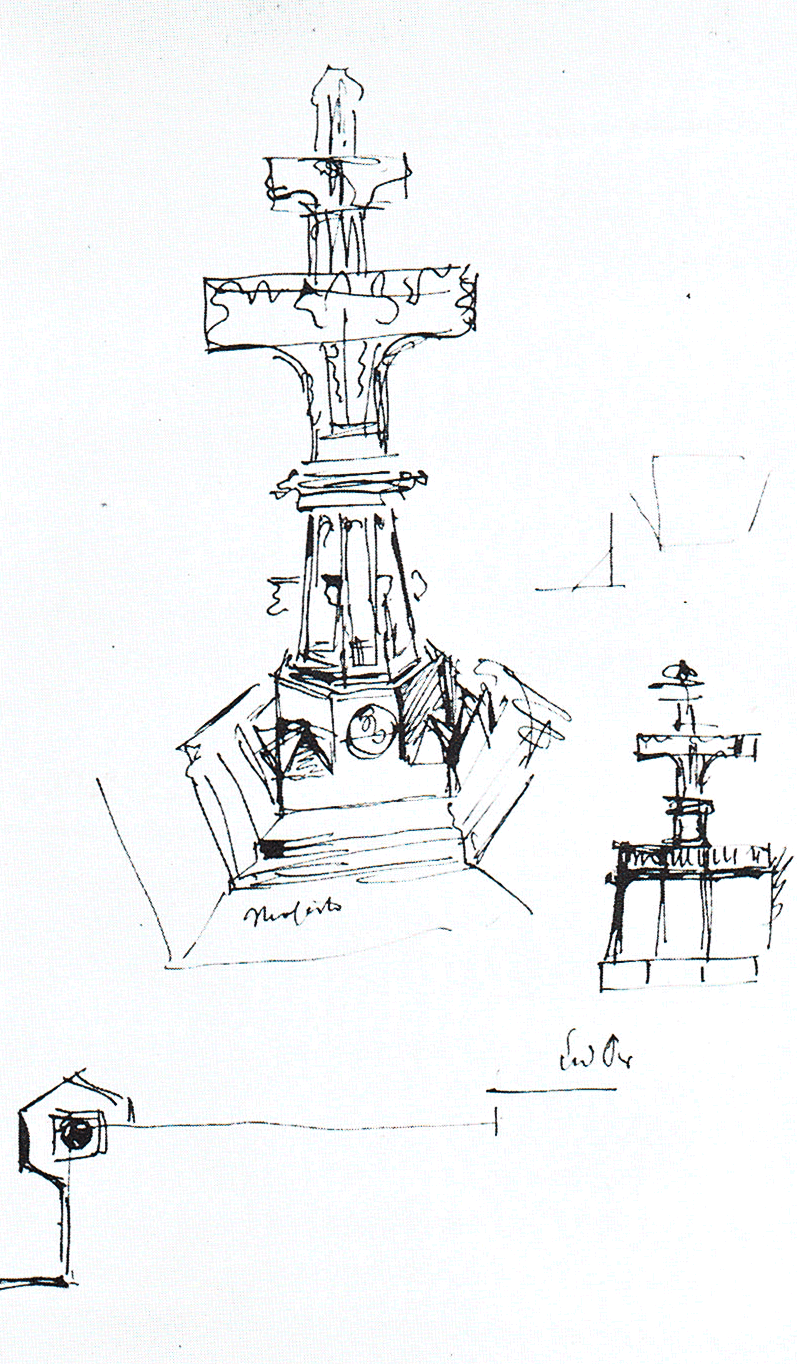
Sketch of a cruciform sculpture, presumably by cathedral master builder Richard Voigtel, c. 1878

Cathedral master builder Richard Voigtel had already originally striven for the production of a third finial as a "monument to the completion of the cathedral". In a sketch and design from 1879, he envisaged a 10.5-metre-high replica of the finials to be erected on the south-eastern corner of the cathedral terrace. However, Voigtel could not prevail with this idea.

In 1980, the year of the cathedral's jubilee, the sculptor Uspelkat made a plastic model based on construction drawings, which was erected in front of the cathedral on 18 March 1980. Although not entirely true to scale and to the original, it enjoyed great popularity until it was severely damaged by storm Wiebke in 1990.

On 11 October 1991, the Cologne Tourist Office had a newly created model of the finial erected in front of the cathedral. The concrete model of the southern finial on a scale of 1:1 was placed 50 metres in front of the west façade of the cathedral between the street Unter Fettenhennen and the Domplatte. The faithful sculpture demonstrates the dimension and details of its prototype.

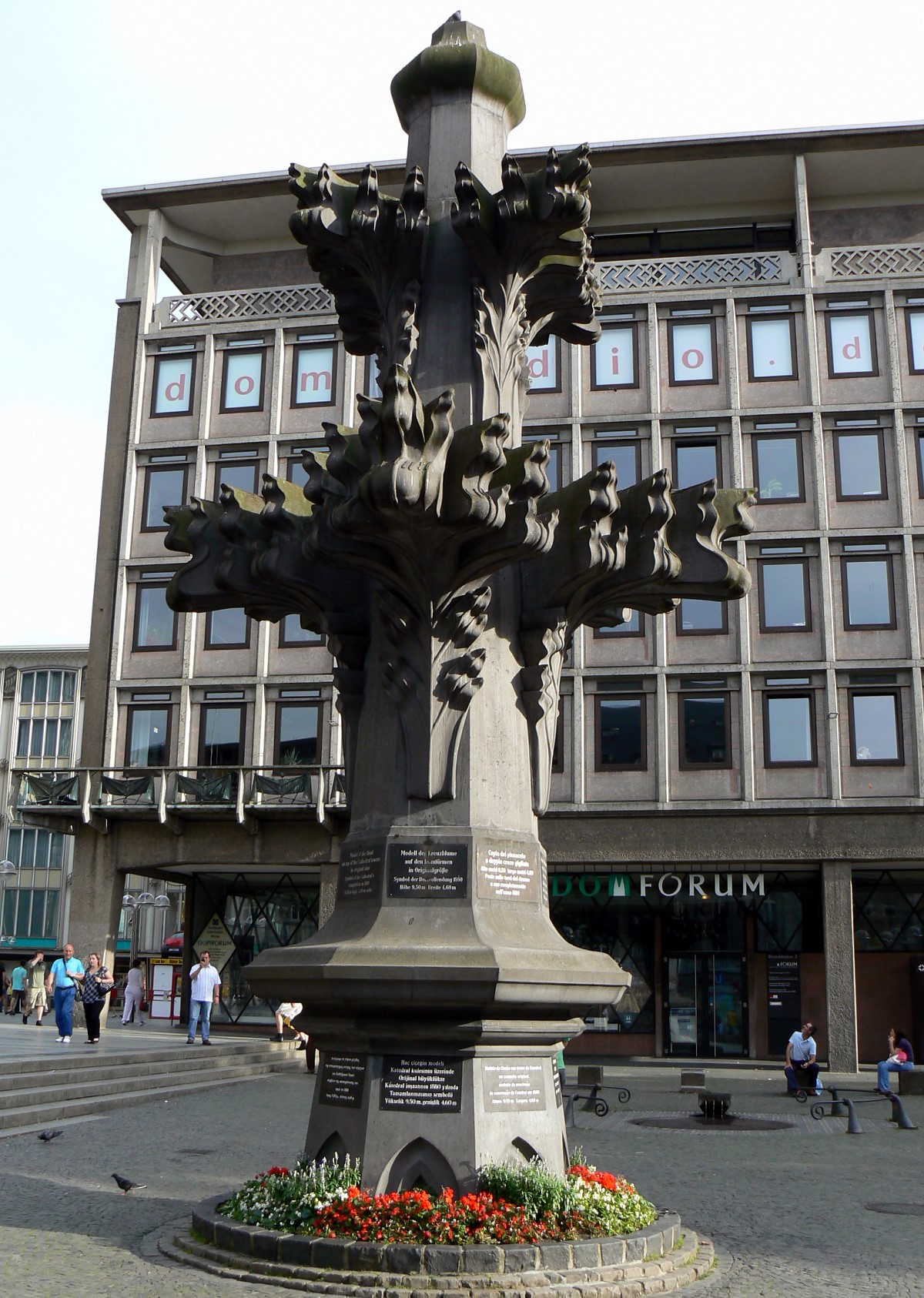
1:1 model at the Domplatte, in the background the Domforum

In an effort to replace the model with a durable structure, the choice fell on a concrete casting due to the considerably lower costs compared to natural stone. First, the finial of the south tower was re-measured and photographed from the air. Using a plaster model on a scale of 1:10, segmentation, reinforcement, formwork and concreting sequences were developed. On a 1:1 raw model made of polystyrene foam blocks, the later Schalhaut made of silicone rubber was applied, which received a supporting body made of epoxy for casting. The finished structure comprised 13 prefabricated parts made of dark grey through-coloured reinforced concrete. Except for the massive leaf crowns and the keystone, all parts were designed as hollow bodies with wall thicknesses between 15 and 20 centimetres for reasons of weight saving.

The finial, which was assembled using a crane, is almost 10 metres high, 5 metres wide and weighs 35 tonnes, less than half the weight of the natural stone model. It is set in a circular flowerbed and bears explanatory panels in 15 languages on its base.

The model of the finial has become a popular meeting point in front of the cathedral and is the starting point for numerous city tours around Cologne Cathedral.

=== Discussion on the location of the crucifers replica ===
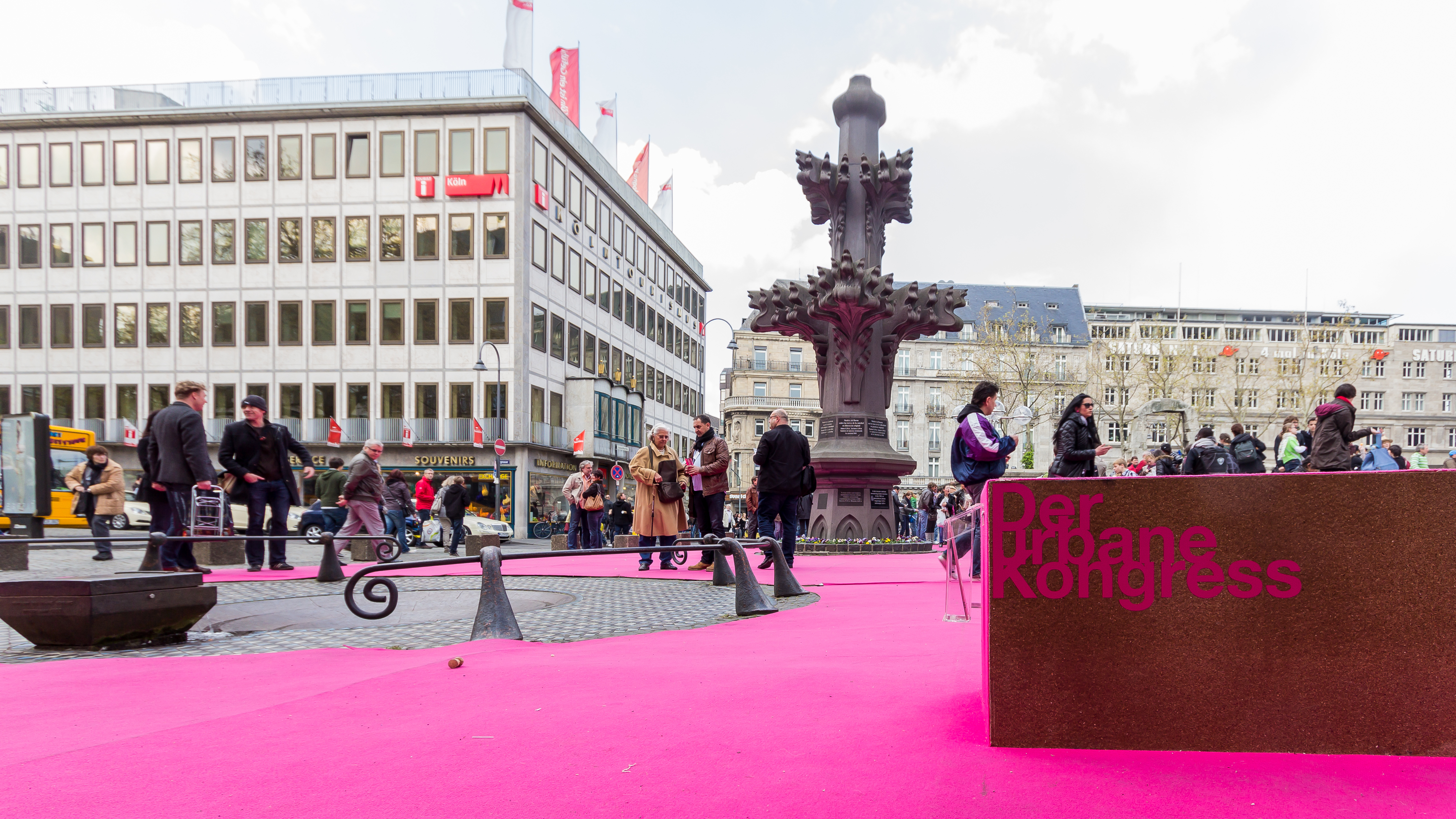
In 2012, the "urban congress" clarified the tense relationship between the crucifix replica and the Dove Fountain with temporary interventions.

In 2012, the "Urban Congress" project commissioned by the City of Cologne, which focused on the conscious handling of art in the public urban space of Cologne, presented a number of recommendations for action, including the removal of the crucifix replica in front of the cathedral, with the aim of calming down or "clearing out" the area in front of the cathedral and giving the actual art monument at this location, the Taubenbrunnen by Ewald Mataré, a more prominent place and a new visibility.

In December 2014, the city centre district council decided to relocate and commissioned the city administration to look for an alternative location, which, however, was not found even months later. Alternative locations discussed included the Burgmauer located in the western viewing axis of the cathedral, the Schlosspark Stammheim or the location of the former concrete mushrooms on the Domplatte, the district council had finally decided on the Deutz side of the Rhine near the Hohenzollern Bridge, i.e. the viewing axis of the cathedral on the right bank of the Rhine. In the recommendation for action of the Urban Congress, the location of the Dombauhütte in front of the cathedral choir is considered typologically sensible, but the terrace of the Café Reichard opposite is also considered.

Barbara Schock-Werner had already criticised the object at this location during her tenure as cathedral architect, since it was charged with a significance in the middle of the cathedral's visual axis that it did not have. City dean Robert Kleine also supported the decision, as well as the then cathedral provost Norbert Feldhoff, the architect Allmann Sattler Wappner commissioned with the cathedral slab reconstruction as well as Marcus Trier from the Romano-Germanic Museum. Overall, the "majority of the interlocutors" in public and private discussions of the "Urban Congress" had considered the current location "unsuitable both for the Dove Fountain and for the perspective on the main portal of the cathedral". After the publication of the plans, opposing voices were found in letters to the editor and comments in the daily press as well as in an online petition, which found almost 2900 supporters. In politics, at the district level, the Greens, Die Linke, Deine Freunde and Pirates were in favour of demolition; in the city council, the SPD was against it, the CDU was in favour of a move to the Burgmauer, although both groups questioned in principle the decision-making power of the district council on this point. A dialogue commissioned by the city council at the end of 2015 between the new Lord Mayor Henriette Reker and District Mayor Andreas Hupke led to the compromise that the finial would remain in its place for the time being until the planned renewal of the western cathedral surroundings.
