= Hermann Schnitzler =

Hermann Joseph Schnitzler (13 January 1905 - 15 December 1976) was a German art historian.

== Life and work ==
Born in Monschau, his family were clothmakers from the town. He attended the Kaiser-Karls-Gymnasium in Aachen, graduating from it in 1924. He began studying music in Stuttgart before shifting to art history at the Universität Berlin under Adolph Goldschmidt and the Universität Bonn under Paul Clemen.

He died in Cologne.

== Selected works ==
- Die Goldschmiedeplastik der Aachener Schreinswerkstatt. Beiträge zur Entwicklung der Goldschmiedekunst des Rhein-Maas-Gebietes in der romanischen Zeit. Düren 1934 (= Dissertation).
- Ein unbekanntes Reiterrelief aus dem Kreise des Naumburger Meisters, in: Zeitschrift des Deutschen Vereins für Kunstwissenschaft 2, 1935, p. 398–423.
- Der Dom zu Aachen. Schwann, Düsseldorf 1950.
- Alte Kunst im Schnütgen-Museum. Tellus, Essen 1956.
- Rheinische Schatzkammer. 2 Bände. Schwann, Düsseldorf 1957 und 1959
- Große Kunst des Mittelalters aus Privatbesitz, Ausstellungskatalog, Schnütgen-Museum Köln 1960

=== Collaborations ===
- with Hans Erich Kubach, Fritz Michel: Die Kunstdenkmäler des Landkreises Koblenz. (= Die Kunstdenkmäler der Rheinprovinz Bd. 16, 3) L. Schwan, Düsseldorf 1944 (Nachdruck 1981, ISBN 3-590-32142-3).
- with Peter Bloch: Die ottonische Kölner Malerschule. 2 Bände. Schwann, Düsseldorf 1967 and 1970.

== Bibliography (in German) ==
- Peter Bloch, Joseph Hoster (ed.): Miscellanea pro arte. Hermann Schnitzler zur Vollendung des 60. Lebensjahres am 13. Januar 1965. Köln 1965 (mit Schriftenverzeichnis).
- Peter Bloch: Hermann Schnitzler. In: Kunstchronik 30, 1977, S. 220–223.
- Rainer Kahsnitz (2007). "Schnitzler, Hermann". Neue Deutsche Biographie (in German). Vol. 23. Berlin: Duncker & Humblot. pp. 337–338. (full text online).
