= Frisius =

Frisius is a surname. Notable people with the surname include:

- Friedrich Frisius (1895–1970), German naval commander
- Gemma Frisius (1508–1555), Dutch philosopher, mathematician, and cartographer
- Johannes Acronius Frisius, Dutch doctor and mathematician
- Simon Frisius, Dutch engraver
