= Johannes Acronius Frisius =

Dutch doctor and mathematician (1520–1564)

Johannes Acronius Frisius (1520 – 18 October 1564) was a Dutch medical doctor and mathematician of the 16th century.

He was named after his city of birth, Akkrum in Friesland. From 1547 he worked as professor of mathematics in Basel, then after 1549 as professor of logic, and in 1564 of medicine. He died from the plague in the same year. Apart from mathematical and scientific works, he wrote Latin poetry and humanist tracts.

According to the Historical Dictionary of Switzerland, "nothing justifies the usual identification of A[cronius] with the philologist and botanist Johannes Atrocianus".

== Publications ==
- De motu terrae
- De sphaera
- De astrolabio et annuli astronomici confectione
- Cronicon und Prognosticon astronomica, manuscript
- biography and 45 aphorisms of the anabaptist David Joris.
