= Franciscus Monachus =

Belgian cartographer (1490–1565)

Franciscus Monachus (c. 1490 – 1565) was born Frans Smunck in Mechelen (or Malines) in the Duchy of Brabant (in modern-day Belgium). His Latinised name, adopted when he matriculated at the University of Louvain, is translated as simply Francis the monk. Franciscus Monachus was identified as the Latinised form of his name, Frans Smunck, in his obituary notice. He is remembered as the cartographer who created the first terrestrial globe in the Low Countries.

== Biography ==
Franciscus studied and taught at the university of Louvain from about 1510 to 1530 and numbered Gemma Frisius among his students. He was also an important influence on Gerardus Mercator. Very little is known of his life and the accounts which do exist are very brief. On leaving Louvain (Leuven) he returned the short distance to Mechelen where he spent the rest of his life in the monastery there. This was no backwater for the Great Council of Mechelen was the supreme court of the Low Countries and would be frequented by the highest in the land.

The monks of Mechelen were Minorite Friars, a humble order which was critical of the corruption of the established church, so much so that over the years its members had been harassed, excommunicated and burned at the stake. They were undoubtedly under suspicion by the hard-line Inquisitors of Louvain University, men such as Ruard Tapper who said of heretics, "It is no great matter whether those that die on this account be guilty or innocent, provided we terrify the people by these examples; which generally succeeds best, when persons eminent for learning, riches, nobility or high stations, are thus sacrificed." Monachus had other additional reasons to come to the notice of the authorities.

The profession of monk was not in conflict with intellectual inquiry. Monachus, the monk, has been described as a court cosmographer and astrologer, the court in question being that of the Emperor Charles V and his regent, Margaret of Austria. He was known for the prediction he gave to Margaret of Austria concerning the defeat and captivity of Francis I at the Battle of Pavia. However, it is his fame as a geographer that has lasted, principally through the globe that he constructed c. 1527.

== The terrestrial globe ==
The globe was made in collaboration with goldsmith Gaspar van der Heyden at the latter's workshop in Louvain. It was possibly a unique construction for nothing has survived, but Monachus described its use in a 1524 letter from Antwerp to his patron, entitled De Orbis Situ ac descriptione ad Reverendiss. D. archiepiscopum Panormitanum, Francisci, Monachi ordinis Franciscani, epistola sane qua luculenta. ('A very exquisite letter from Francis, a monk of the Franciscan order, to the most reverend Archbishop of Palermo, touching the site and description of the globe'.) The publisher was granted a copyright, which was printed on the title page and stated: "With a privilege from the Most Invincible Emperor of the Romans, Charles V, that for five years no man may print or cause to be printed this geographical book with globes under forfeit of all copies and otherwise the imposition of the most severe penalty".

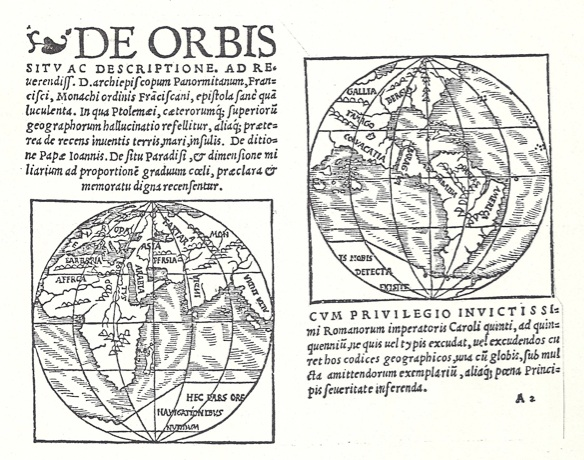
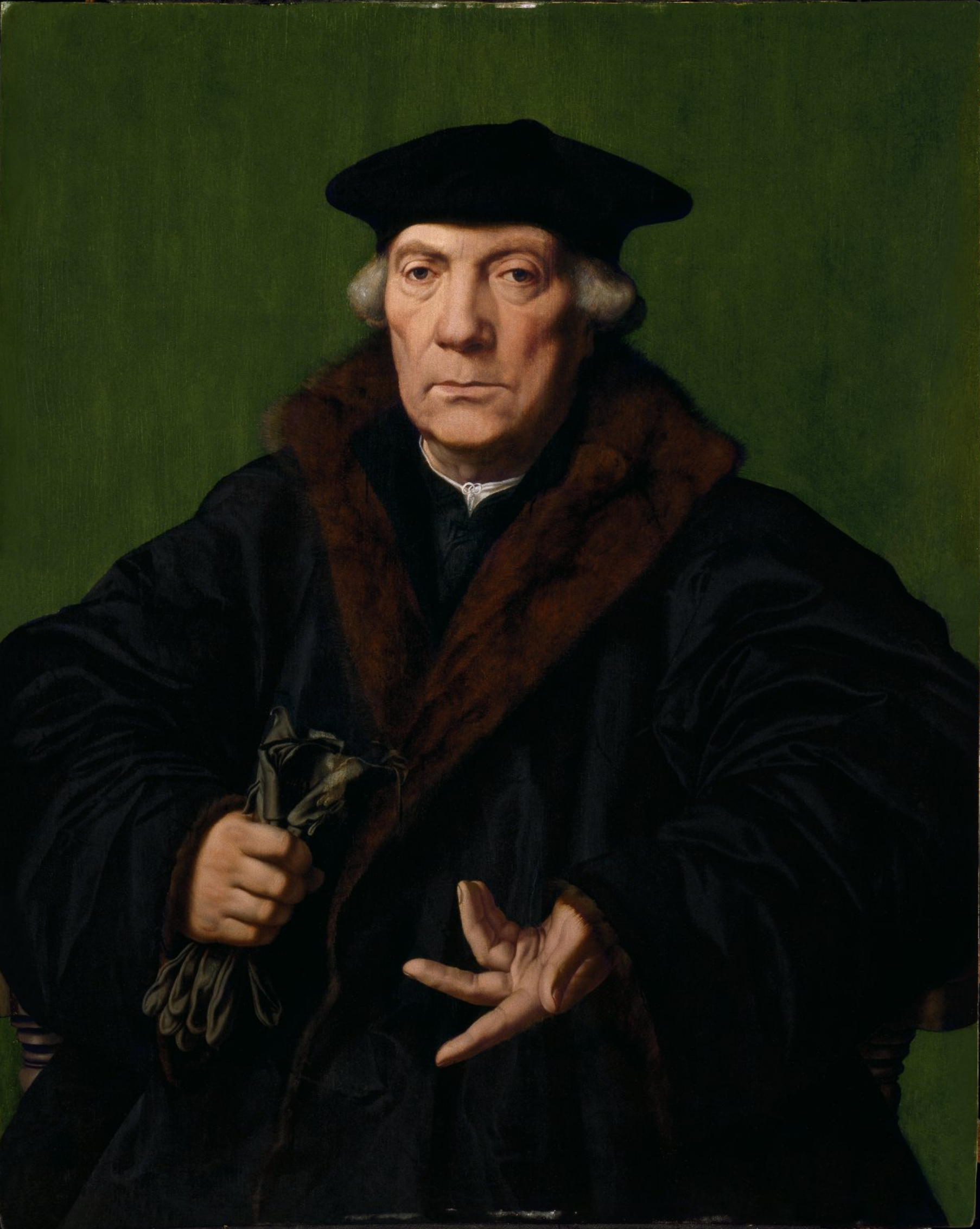
The pamphlet describing the globe of Monachus and (right) the dedicatee Jean Carondelet

The Archbishop of Palermo was Jean Carondelet (nl:Jan II Carondelet) a Burgundian cleric, politician, jurist and one of the most important advisors to the Habsburg rulers, Philip I and his son Charles V. Such connections ensured his rapid advancement in the church hierarchy and the award of rich benefices such as the archbishopric was simply a financial perquisite. Fortunately, Carondelet published the text of the letter in a pamphlet which was widely circulated and reprinted several times.

The image of the letter shows it beginning with a forthright condemnation of the nonsense (geographorum hallucinatio) of Ptolemy and other early geographers and by implication it contradicted Aristotle's view of the world—and to disbelieve Aristotle's views, which were at the centre of religious orthodoxy, was officially heresy. Monachus had his own views of geography which were based on investigation, observation and observation rather than Aristotelian dicta. Such beliefs exposed Monachus to suspicion.

The hemispheres shown in the pamphlet are presumed to be rough sketches printed with two small woodcuts about 66 mm (2.6 in) in diameter. The actual globe was certainly larger and finer in every respect since the reply to Monachus contains the following statement: Orbis globum, in quo terrae ac maria luculenter depicta sunt, una cum epistola accepimus—'We accept the globe of the world on which the land and sea are elegantly depicted, together with the epistle'.

As noted by Jan Denucé, a fairly faithful image of the lost globe probably exists in Oronce Fine's map of 1531, which reflected the views of Monachus.

The content of the map is discussed in great detail by Stevenson and Harrisse and a summary of their findings by Siebold is readily available online. The most important features are as follows:

- North America is no longer an island as shown in the Waldseemuller map made about 20 years previously. Instead it is shown as an extension of mainland Asia. However, Monachus did accept Waldseemuller's concept of separate North and South Americas, although he reduces the separation to a channel (coincidentally close to the modern Panama Canal) which he admits (in the epistle) might be dubious even if wished for as providing easy access to the Moluccas (Spice Islands). This was one of the first maps to deny the existence of a Pacific ocean extending into the northern hemisphere.
- The Caribbean, the Gulf of Mexico, the Florida peninsula and all of South America are remarkably accurate. Many later maps would lack this fidelity.
- The existence of a Southern continent is confidently asserted on the hemispheres shown in the pamphlet, which bear the inscription in Latin which translates: "This part of the coastline that has been revealed to us by voyages is not yet evident". A paragraph in the text explains:
  To the south, land has been found in two places south of America toward the South Pole, stretching in longitude 43 degrees westward, to latitude south sometimes to 54, sometimes 53, sometimes 55 degrees as the topography reveals. Moreover in the year 1526 a land has been discovered at 0 degrees longitude and 52 degrees south latitude, parts of which are empty of inhabitants. The rest of the Austral coasts still lie in obscurity, but to me it seems very likely that that part of the Earth is not overspread and covered by the Ocean. Indeed it is conjectured and argued that vast and extensive regions and islands lie there, but because of the distances between places and the infertile nature of the soil, they are less frequented.

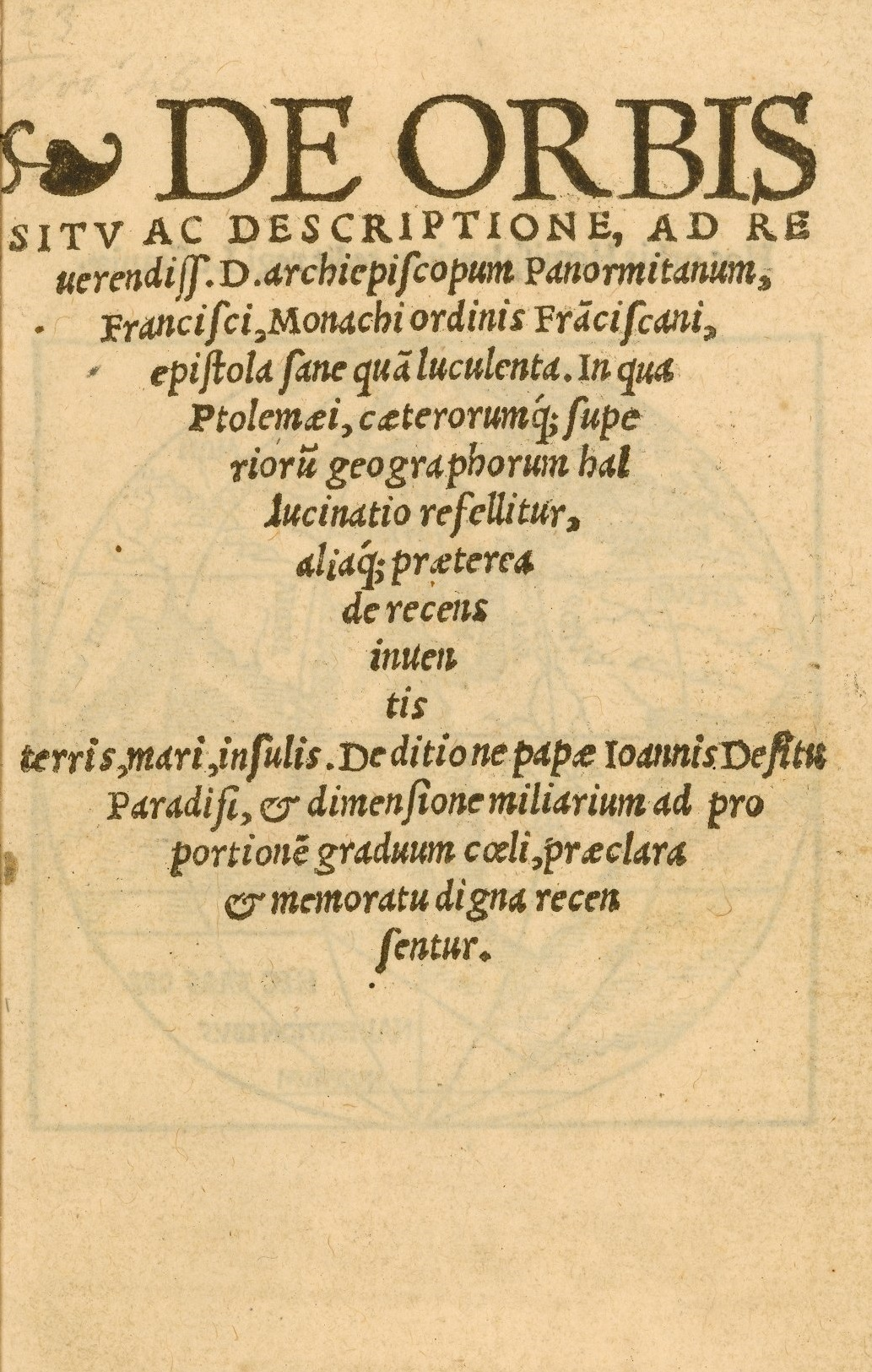
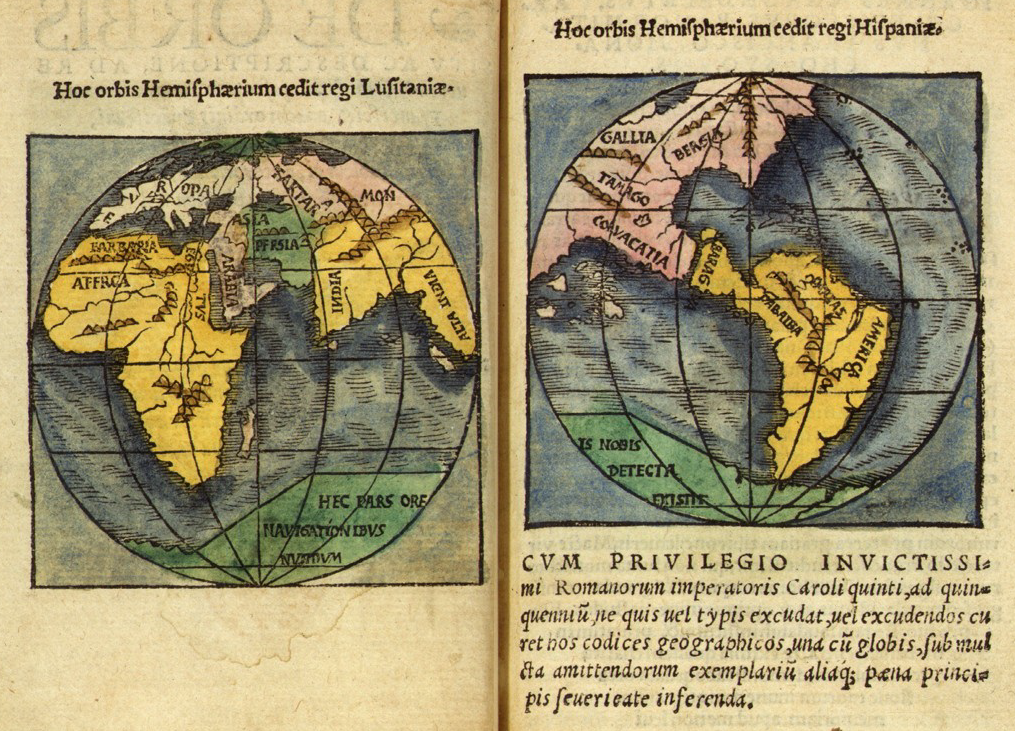
Another edition of the pamphlet indicating Portuguese (Lusitanian) and Spanish hemispheres.

It is the legends above the two hemispheres (in the edition preserved at the Bibliothèque Nationale) which would have been of great interest to Carondelet: Hoc orbis Hemisphaerium cedit regi Hispaniae and Hoc orbis Hemisphaerium cedit regi Lusitaniae ('This hemisphere of the globe is granted to the King of Spain/Portugal'). Carondelet was the principal advisor of Charles at a time when Spain and Portugal were again debating the division of the world into two hemispheres. The 1494 Treaty of Tordesillas (and its amendments) had agreed a demarcation line that divided the Atlantic and cut through South America. Everything to the east, from Brazil to India, was Portuguese; everything to the west was Spanish. Twenty or so years later the discovery of the riches of the Moluccas (Spice Islands), at a time when the mineral wealth of South America was untapped, gave rise to a great debate as to who should possess those Islands. In 1528, Monachus presented Carondelet a geographical globe which implied that the anti-meridian of the Tordesillas dividing line would clearly put the Moluccas in the Spanish hemisphere. In his accompanying tract, De Orbis Situ, he said: "Maximilian Transylvanus recently published a letter concerning the Moluccas islands, which exist in the sea called variously the Mar del Sur, or of the Sinae, or of Syn [China Sea], finally revealed to the men of our age excellently, and clearly all in the portion and dominion of the King of Spain, except for Java and Porne or Borneo, of which a part toward the west is subject to the King of Portugal, the part which faces the east being subject to the King of Spain". It is therefore no surprise that Carondolet published as widely as he could. One year later the Treaty of Zaragoza was concluded whereby Spain lost the Moluccas despite the globe of Monachus.

== Bibliography ==
- Brandt, Geeraert; Chamberlayne, John (1740), The History of the Reformation and Other Ecclesiastical Transactions in and about the Low-Countries., T. Wood
- Broecke, Steven Van den (2003), The Limits of Influence: Pico, Louvain, and the Crisis of Renaissance Astrology, Brill, pp. 113–114, ISBN 90-04-13169-8
- Cosgrove, Denis (1999), Mappings, Reaktion Books, pp. 85–6, ISBN 978-1-86189-021-4
- Crane, Nicholas (2003). Mercator: the man who mapped the planet (paperback ed.). London: Phoenix (Orion Books Ltd). ISBN 0-7538-1692-X. OCLC 493338836. Original hardback edition published in 2002. Published in New York by H. Holt.
- Gallois, Lucien (1894), revue, Henry Harisse, The Discovery of North America, en Revue Historique (Paris), Tome 54, Mai-Août, pp. 396–415.
- Denuce, Jan (1910I, ‘Eenige onzer minder bekende kartografen uit het begin der XVIe eeuw [Quelques-uns de nos cartographes peu connus du début du xvie siècle]', Handelingen van het eerste Taal- en Geschiedkundig Congres gehouden te Antwerpen den 17-18-19 September 1910, Antwerpen, pp.258-267.
- De Smet, Antoine (1967), "Cartographies scientifiques néerlandais du premier tiers du XVI siècle — Leurs references aux Portugais," Revista da Faculdade de Ciências, Universidade de Coimbra, vol.39 : 363-74, reprinted in De Smet, Antoine (1974), Album Antoine De Smet, Brussels, Centre National d'Histoire des Sciences, pp. 329–45. Library of Congress.
- De Smet, Antoine (1964), “L'Orfevre et Graveur Gaspar Vander Heyden et la Construction Des Globes à Louvain dans le premier tiers du XVIe siècle”, Der Globusfreund, no.13, pp. 38–48, p. 41.
- De Smet, Antoine (2011), ‘Géographes’, in Eva Kushner (ed.), L'Époque de la Renaissance (1400 1600), Tome III, Maturations et Mutations (1520 1560), Amsterdam & Philadelphia, John Benjamins, pp. 486–491.
- Harrisse, Henry (1892), The discovery of North America : a critical, documentary, and historic investigation, pp. 544–553, OCLC 890824558. Both Articles 170 and 171 are relevant. (The actual pdf pages are 620–629.) World Cat lists many editions including two recent reprints by Arkose Press and Martino Pub.
- Horst, Thomas (2011), Le monde en cartes : Gérard Mercator (1512-1594) et le premier atlas du monde, Mercator Fonds, ISBN 9789061531579, OCLC 800735628, archived from the original on 2016-02-01.
- Karrow, R.W. (1993), Mapmakers of the sixteenth century and their maps, Published for the Newberry Library by Speculum Orbis Press, ISBN 0932757057
- King, Robert J. (2019), “Franciscus Monachus and the c.1529 Paris Gilt Globe”, and “Franciscus Monachus’ De Orbis Situ ac Descriptione: A parallel translation”, The Globe, no.86, pp. 19–69.
- Osley, Arthur Sidney (1969), Mercator, a monograph on the lettering of maps, etc. in the 16th century Netherlands, with a facsimile and translation of his treatise on the italic hand and a translation of Ghim's 'Vita Mercatoris', London: Faber and Faber, OCLC 256563091.
- Siebold, James (2010), A personal collection of maps and globes. The information on Monachus and his globe is under item 337.
- Stevenson, Edward Luther (1921). Terrestrial and celestial globes : their history and construction, including a consideration of their value as aids in the study of geography and astronomy. Yale University Press. This is a scan of Volume 1 covering clobes up to 1600. Later globes are covered in Volume 2. There is also a good OCR version produced by the Scientific Library with provides searchable text: volume 1, volume 2
- Taylor, Andrew (2004), The world of Gerard Mercator, Walker, ISBN 0802713777, OCLC 55207983
- Van der Krogt, Peter (1993). Globi Neerlandici : the production of globes in the Low Countries. Utrecht: HES Publishers. ISBN 9061941385. See Biblio.co.uk
