= Mellemolen, Akkrum =

Windmill in Akkrum, Netherlands

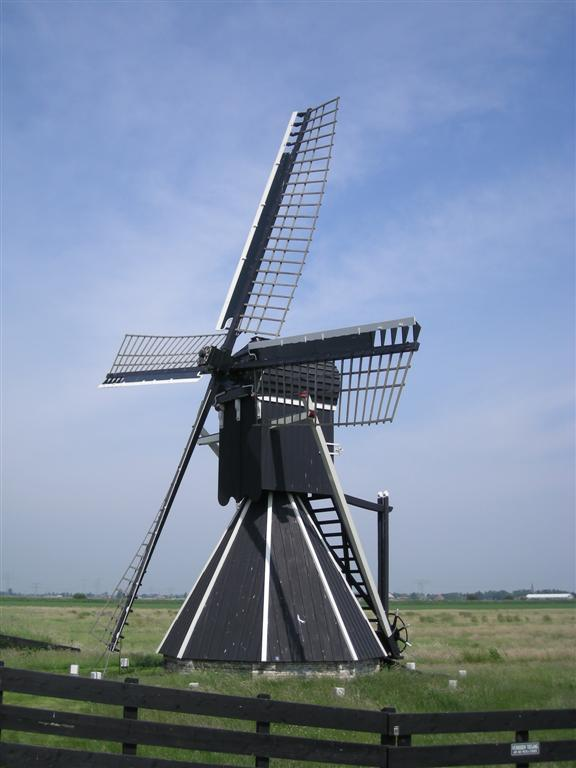
- The mill in June 2007
- Interactive map of Mellemolen, Akkrum

Origin
- Mill name: Mellemolen; Polslootpolermolen; Spookolen
- Mill location: Nije Skou 2, 8491 MT, Akkrum
- Coordinates: 53°01′54″N 5°50′10″E
- Operator: Stichting Molens De Lege Midden
- Year built: 2004

Information
- Purpose: Drainage mill
- Type: Hollow post mill
- Roundhouse storeys: Single storey roundhouse
- No. of sails: Four sails
- Type of sails: Common sails
- Windshaft: Wood
- Winding: Tailpole and winch
- Type of pump: Archimedes' screw

Mellemolen, formerly known as the Polslootpoldermolen (English: Polsloot Polder Mill) or Spookmolen (English: Ghost Mill) is a hollow post mill in Akkrum, Friesland, Netherlands, which has been restored to working order. The mill is listed as a Rijksmonument, number 35937.

== History ==
De Polslpootpoldermolen was marked on a map of Utingeradeel dated 1849. The mill was then known as the Spookmolen. In 1947 it was decided to replace the mill with an electrically powered pump. Permission was sought to demolish the mill but this was denied, as it was again in 1952. The mill was repaired in 1961 and 1971. On 13 November 1972 the mill was blown down in a storm. It was restored in 1976 at a cost of f80,000. At this time it was owned by the Gemeente Boarnsterhim and stood at Ulbe Twijnstrawel 21, 8491 CD, Akkrum.

The mill's condition again deteriorated under the ownership of the Gemeente Boarnsterhim. Concern was expressed about its condition by the Monumentenzorg and De Hollandsche Molen. Stichting Molens de Leeg Midden was formed and took over the mill. Plans were made to rebuild it at a new location. The mill was dismantled in 2003 and rebuilt at its new site. This was completed in June 2004, and the mill was renamed the Mellemolen. The work was carried out by Fabrikaat Hiemstra of Tzummarum.

== Description ==
Mellemolen is what the Dutch call a Spinnekopmolen ("spider mill"). It is a small hollow post mill with an octagonal roundhouse. The four Common sails, which have a span of 14.08 metres (46 ft 2 in), are carried on a wooden windshaft which is about 2.60 metres (8 ft 6 in) long. The mill had a cast-iron windshaft before the 2004 rebuild. The millwright replaced it because he did not like the use of a cast-iron windshaft in a Spinnekop. The brake wheel has 35 cogs, and drives the wallower (17 cogs) at the top of the upright shaft, which is contained within the post of the trestle. At the lower end of the upright shaft, the crown wheel (30 cogs) drives the wooden Archimedes screw via a gearwheel with 33 cogs.. The Archimedes screw has an axle diameter of 340 millimetres (1 ft 1 in) and a total diameter of 1.03 metres (3 ft 5 in) and is inclined at 26°. Each revolution pumps 236 litres (52 imp gal) of water.

== Public access ==
Mellemolen is open to the public by appointment only.
