= Gaspard van der Heyden =

Dutch goldsmith, engraver, printer and builder of precision astronomical instruments

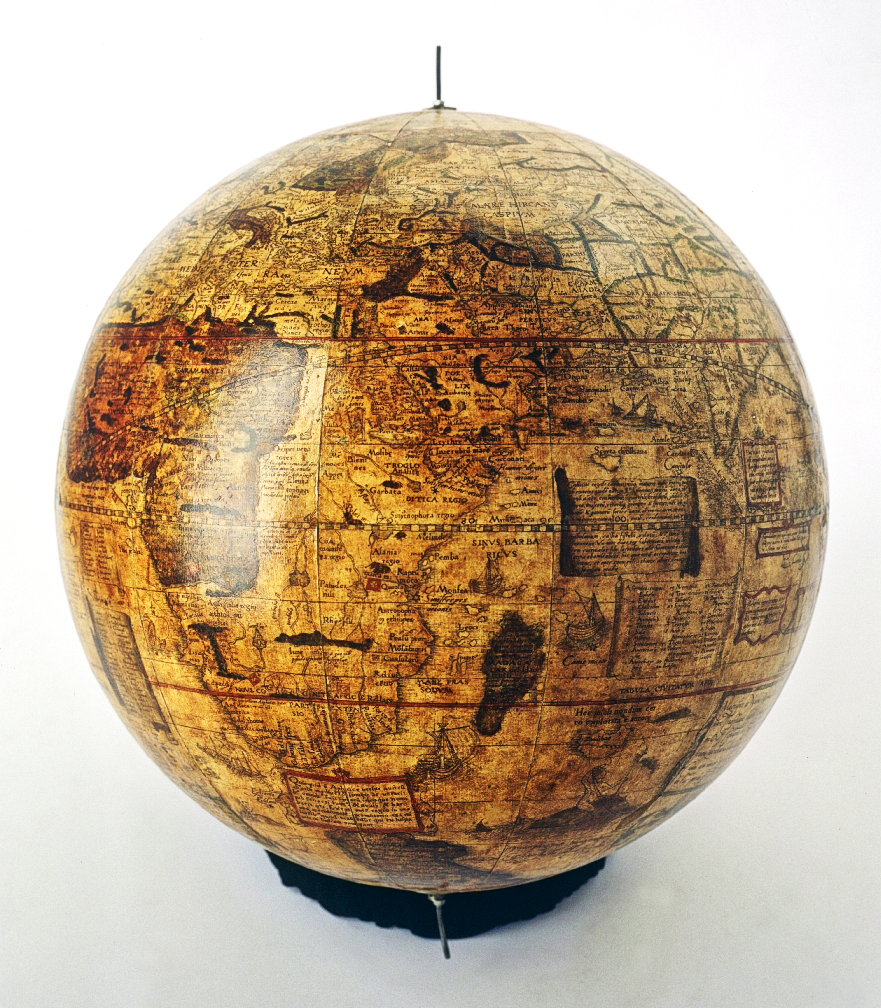
- Born: 1496; Leuven
- Died: 1549 (aged 52–53); Leuven
- Other names: Gaspar à Myrica; Caspar de Myrica; Jaspar Amyricus
- Occupation: Goldsmith
- Spouse: Anna van Luye
- Parents: Peter van der Heyden (father); Katharina van den Berghe (mother)

Gaspard van der Heyden (also known as Gaspar à Myrica) (c. 1496 – c. 1549) was a goldsmith, engraver, master printer and builder of precision astronomical instruments including terrestrial and celestial globes from Leuven, Belgium. He was well known among the humanists in Leuven as well as among scientists and mathematicians.

== Life ==
Gaspard was the son of the surgeon Peter van der Heyden and Katharina van den Berghe. He was born around 1496 in Leuven. He's recorded to have married his wife, Anna van Luye in 1521. Little of his early life and education are recorded, but he was considered to be more than an artist, an engraver, a highly qualified craftsman, and a metal worker. He certainly had scientific education, especially in mathematics. A letter from Prof. Goglenius of Leuven dated December 2, 1531, to a friend of Erasmus, namely, to John Dantiscus, Polish policeman in the Netherlands, and great protector of Gemma Frisius, shows us that he and several other local humanists were friends of Erasmus. Goglenius thanks Dantiscus for a gift sent to him by Jaspar aurifex(Gaspard van der Heyden). The fact that the family name is not given makes it seem plausible that the goldsmith had a very good reputation among the Humanists in Leuven and the Court of Marius of Hungary. Unfortunately, Goclenius does not mention what type of object the gift was.

== Career ==
Gaspard van der Heyden was a goldsmith in Leuven whose work ranged from civic metalwork to the construction of early scientific instruments. He is recorded as an "aurifaber" (goldsmith) in demographic records from 1524 and his name appears several times in the civic records of Leuven.

In 1526, he received payment for producing a copper seal used in the collection of the beer tax. On 31 August 1526, he was commissioned to make a gilded silver chain for a city musician. In 1527, he made a seal for the town on 17 August and, on 19 December, repaired the chain of a civic whistle. In 1531/32, he was commissioned to produce a stamp for embossing cloth.

Van der Heyden was considered an important member of the Leuven geographic circle, and was noted by English scholar John Dee when he went abroad to speak with "some learned men, and chiefly Mathematicians, as Gemma Phrysius, Gerardus Mercator, Gaspar à Myrica [Gaspard van der Heyden], Antonius Gogava."

In 1526 or 1527, he produced a terrestrial and a celestial globe with the Franciscan friar and cartographer Franciscus Monachus of Mechelen. The globes themselves have not survived, but they are known through a letter Monachus wrote to his patron, the Archbishop of Palermo, titled De Orbis Situ ac descriptione. In that letter, Monachus describes how the globe represented the world.

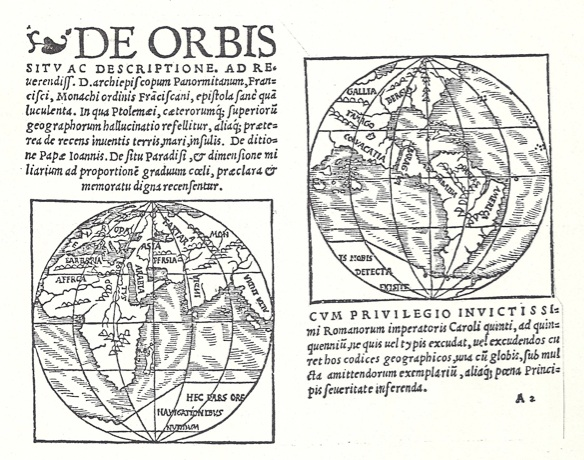
De Orbis letter describing 1527 globe designed by Monachus

He built another terrestrial globe with the assistance of Gemma Frisius in 1529, but they planned a new globe by 1535 to better represent new geographical discoveries. The new globe was completed in 1536 with Gerardus Mercator who apprenticed under van der Heyden. A celestial globe was produced by Frisius, Mercator and van der Heyden in 1537. Copies of the newer globes were produced until the 1570s. A legend engraved on the celestial globe reads "Made by Gemma Frisius, doctor and mathematician, Gaspar à Myrica [Van der Heyden], and Gerardus Mercator of Rupelmonde in the year of the virgin birth 1537."

On 4 July 1549, he received compensation for a five-day stay in Antwerp, where he bought a cup from the goldsmith Matthieu van Campen. This gilded silver cup was then decorated with the coat of arms of the town, inscribed with the inscription "insignia oppidi Lovaniensis", and presented to Philip II of Spain on 5 July 1549 during his visit to Leuven.

== See also ==
- Atlas Cosmographicae
- Celestial globe
- Franciscus Monachus
- Gemma Frisius
- Gerardus Mercator
- Globe
- Golden Age of Netherlandish cartography (also known as the Golden Age of Dutch cartography)
- History of cartography
