= Gemma Frisius =

Frisian physician, mathematician and cartographer (1508–1555)

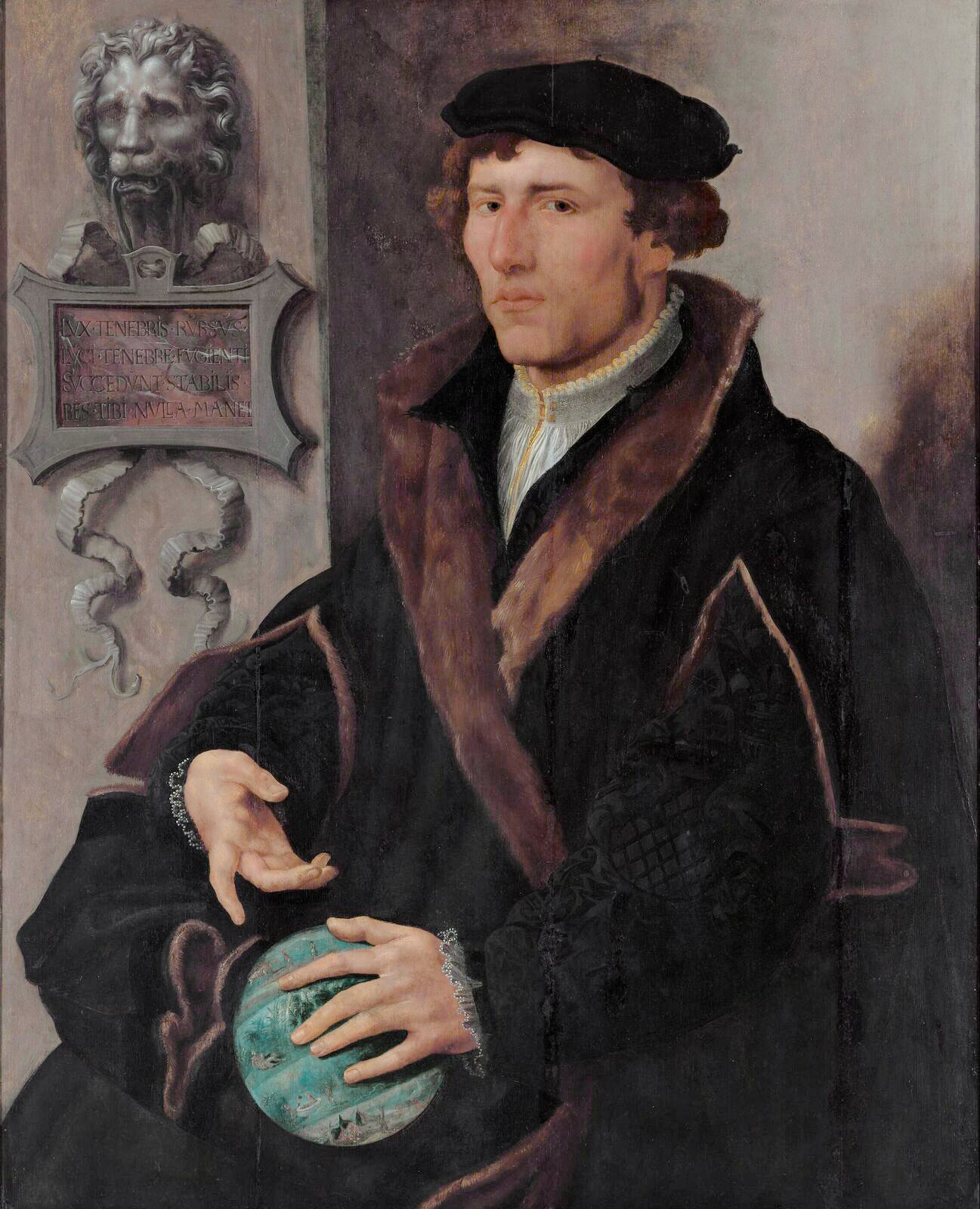
Gemma Frisius, (Maarten van Heemskerck, c. 1540–1545)

Gemma Frisius (/ˈfrɪziəs/; born Jemme Reinerszoon; December 9, 1508 – May 25, 1555) was a Dutch physician, mathematician, cartographer, philosopher, and instrument maker. He created important globes, improved the mathematical instruments of his day and applied mathematics in new ways to surveying and navigation. Gemma's rings, an astronomical instrument, are named after him. Along with Gerardus Mercator and Abraham Ortelius, Frisius is often considered one of the founders of the Netherlandish school of cartography, and significantly helped lay the foundations for the school's golden age (approximately 1570s–1670s).

== Early life and education ==
Frisius was born in Dokkum, Friesland (present-day Netherlands), of poor parents who died when he was young.

He began his studies at the Old University of Leuven in Leuven (present-day Belgium) in 1525, aged about 16, and qualified there as a doctor of medicine in 1536.

He remained on the faculty of medicine of Leuven for the rest of his life where, in addition to teaching medicine, he also taught mathematics, astronomy and geography.

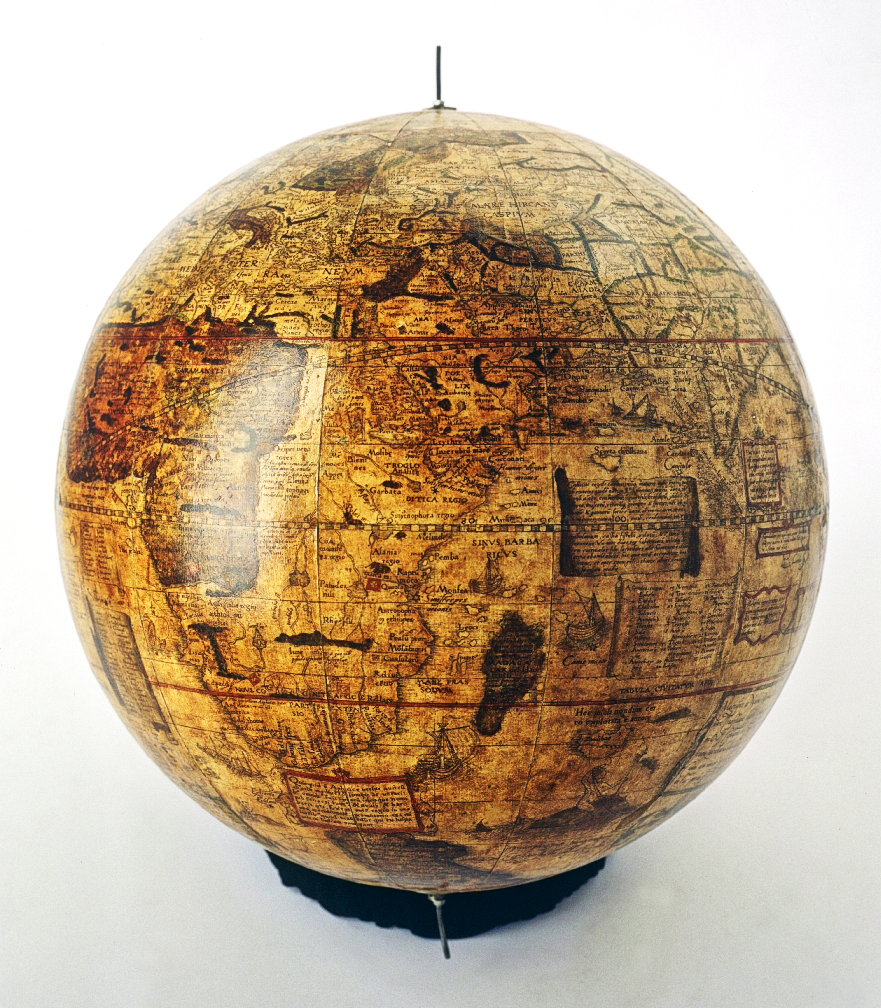
Gemma Frisius's famous 1536 terrestrial globe

== Career ==
=== Globes ===
One of his most influential teachers at Leuven was Franciscus Monachus who, circa 1527, had constructed a famous globe in collaboration with the Leuven goldsmith Gaspar van der Heyden

Under the guidance of Monachus and with the technical assistance of Van der Heyden, Frisius was involved in the production of globes and mathematical instruments noted for their quality and accuracy.

Of particular fame were the terrestrial globe of 1536 and the celestial globe of 1537. On the first, Frisius is named as author, with technical assistance from Van der Heyden and engraving by Gerardus Mercator, then his pupil. On the second, Mercator is credited alongside Frisius.

=== Scientific contributions ===
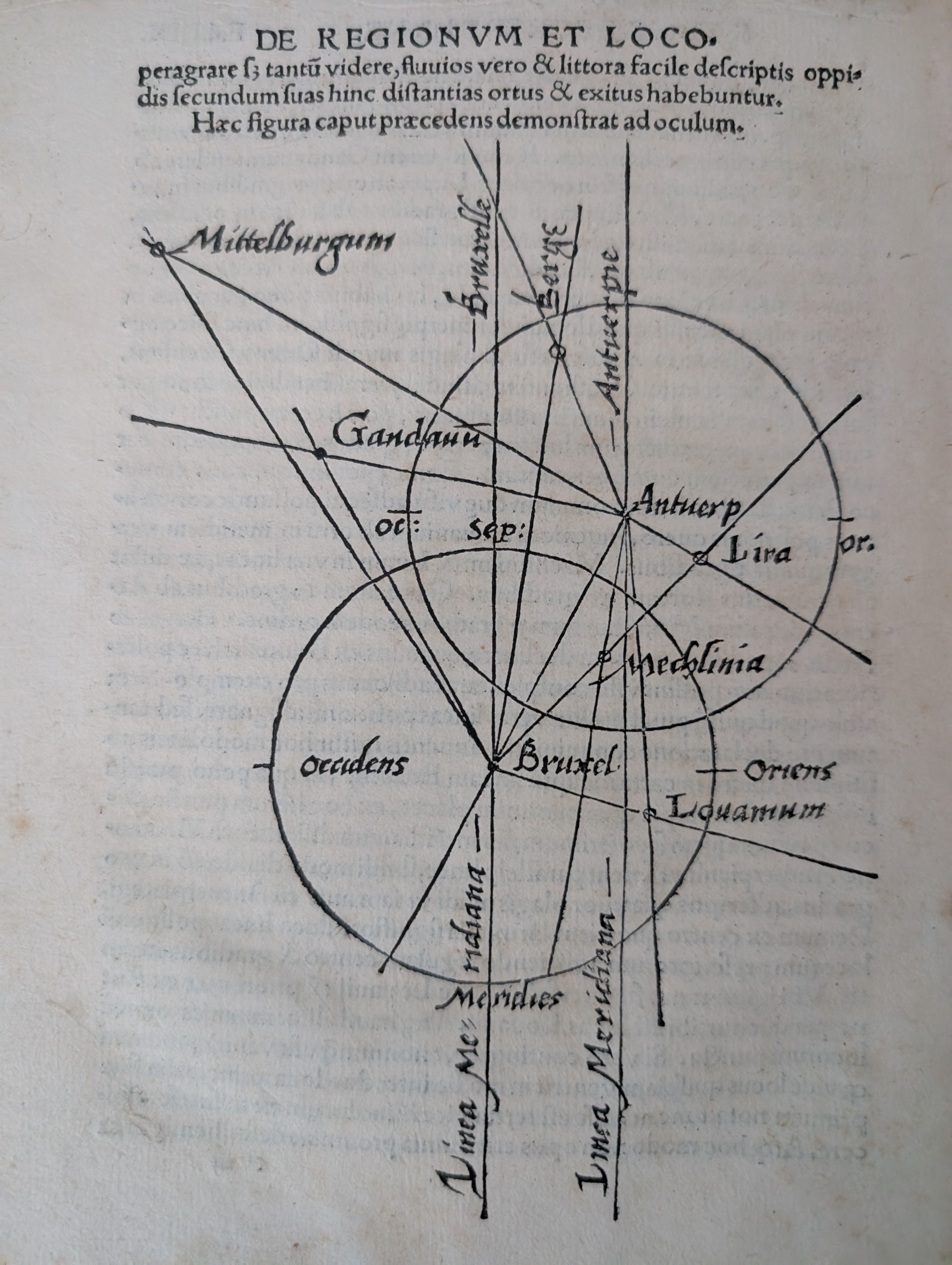
Gemma Frisius's 1533 diagram introducing triangulation into the science of surveying

In 1533, he described for the first time the method of triangulation still used today in surveying (see diagram). Having established a baseline, e.g., in this case, the cities of Brussels and Antwerp, the location of other cities, e.g. Middelburg, Ghent etc., can be found by taking a compass direction from each end of the baseline, and plotting where the two directions cross. This was only a theoretical presentation of the concept — due to topographical restrictions, it is impossible to see Middelburg from either Brussels or Antwerp. Nevertheless, the figure soon became well known all across Europe.

Twenty years later, in about 1553, he was the first to describe how an accurate clock could be used to determine longitude. Jean-Baptiste Morin (1583–1656) did not believe that Frisius' method for calculating longitude would work, remarking, "I do not know if the Devil will succeed in making a longitude timekeeper but it is folly for man to try." It took two centuries before John Harrison produced a sufficiently accurate clock.

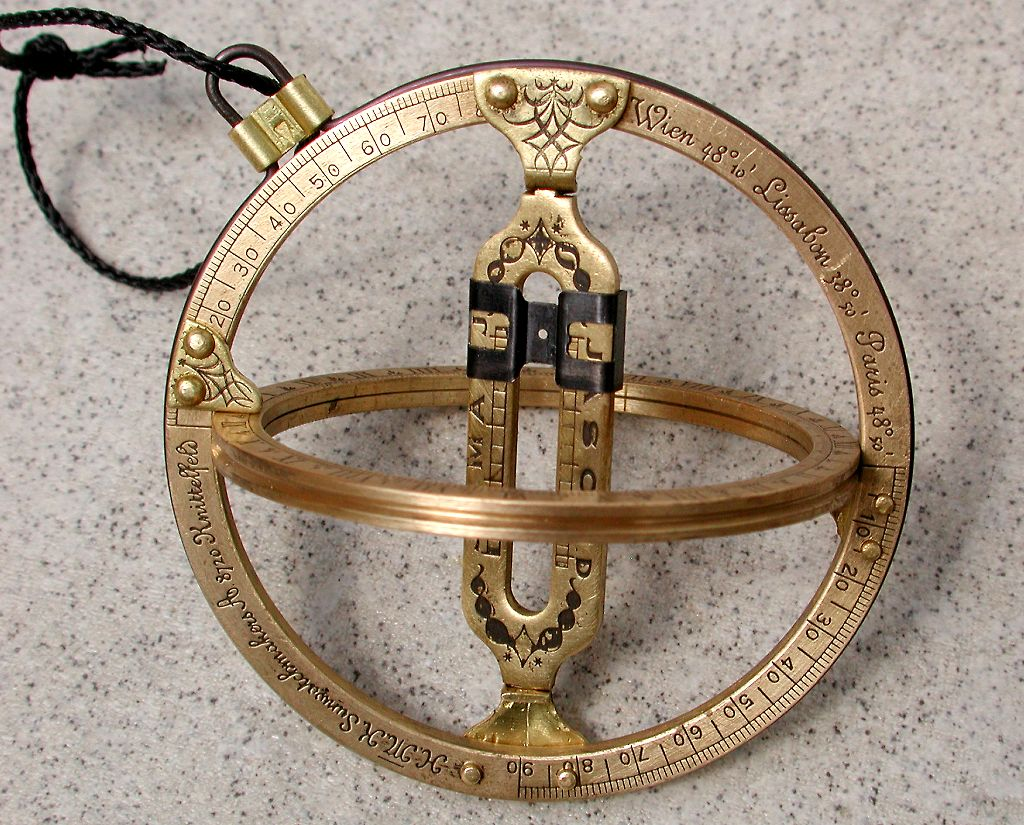
Kala Pocket Sundial

Frisius created or improved many instruments, including the cross-staff, the astrolabe, and the astronomical rings (also known as "Gemma's rings").

=== Students ===
His students included Gerardus Mercator (who became his collaborator), Johannes Stadius, John Dee, Andreas Vesalius and Rembert Dodoens.

== Death ==
Frisius died in Leuven on 25 May 1555 at the age of 46. According to his son Cornelius, he died from complications of kidney stones, from which he had suffered for at least seven years.

== Legacy ==
His oldest son, Cornelius Gemma, edited a posthumous volume of his work and continued to work with Ptolemaic astronomical models.

Frisius Point in the South Shetland Islands in Antarctica is named after Gemma Frisius.

A lunar crater has been named after him.

== Works ==
- Cosmographia (1529) von Petrus Apianus, annotated by Gemma Frisius
- De principiis astronomiae et cosmographiae (1530)
- De usu globi (1530)
- Libellus de locorum describendorum ratione (1533)
- Arithmeticae practicae methodus facilis (Antwerp, 1540), and Paris, 1543 available on KU Leuven Special Collections (high quality)
- De annuli astronomici usu (1540)
- De radio astronomico et geometrico (1545)
- De principiis astronomiae et cosmographiae (in Latin). Paris. 1547.
- De astrolabio catholico (1556) also available on KU Leuven Special Collections (high quality)
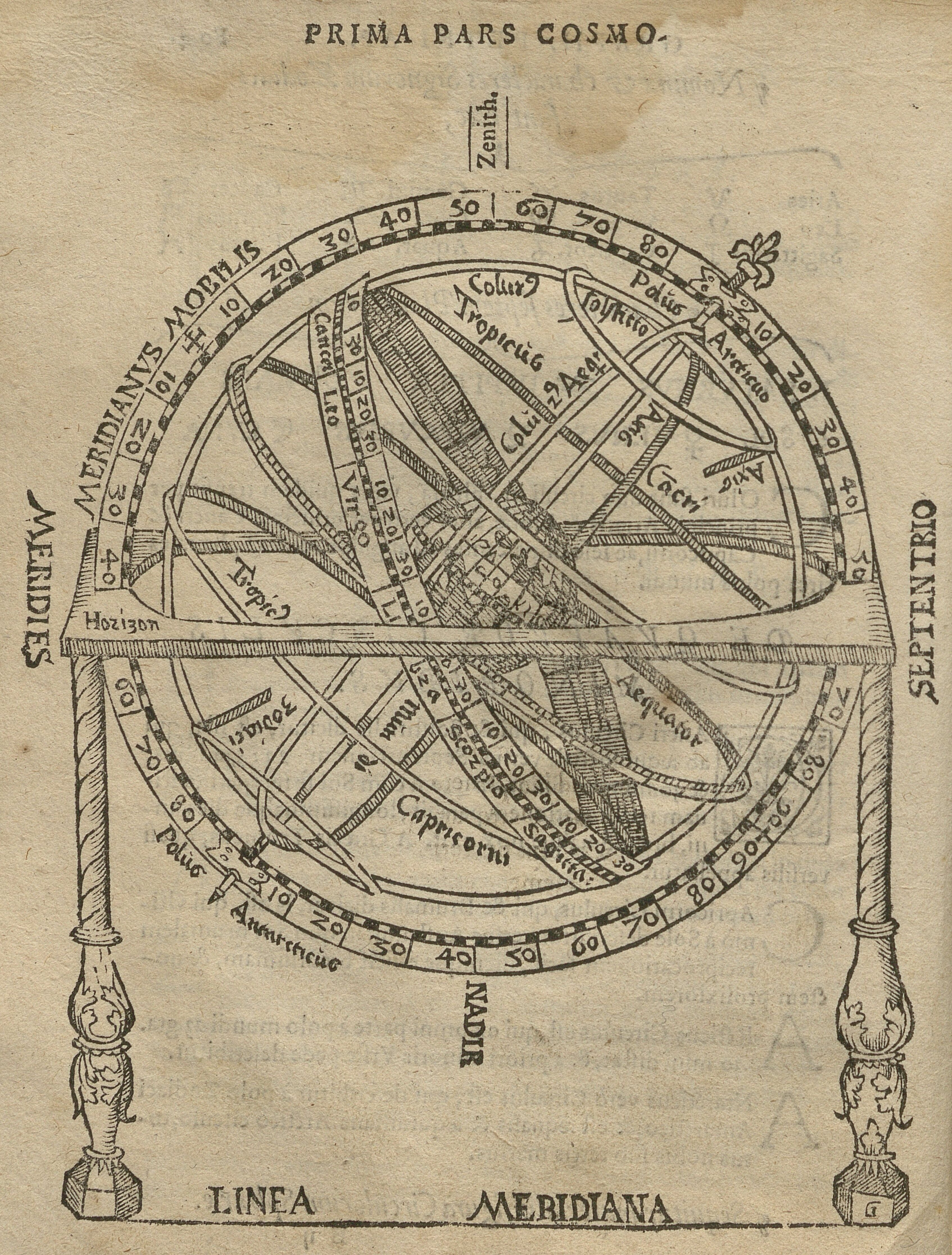
Page from Cosmographia

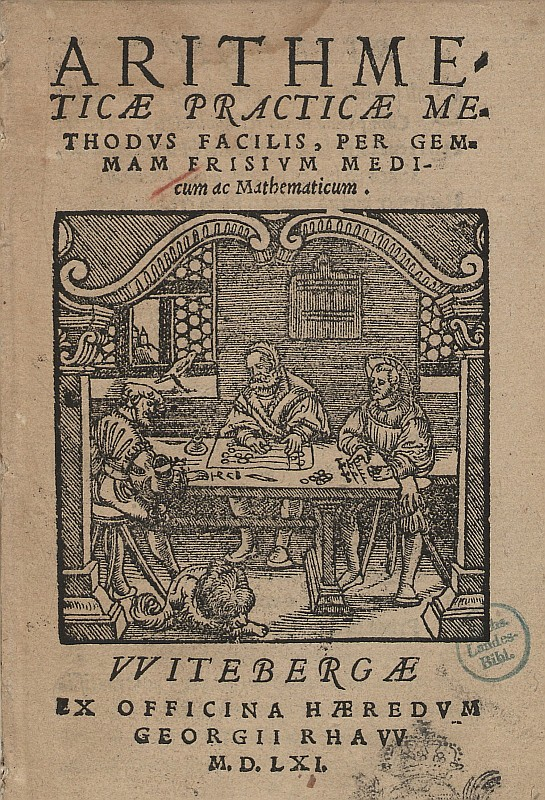
Frontispiece of Arithmeticae practicae methodus facilis

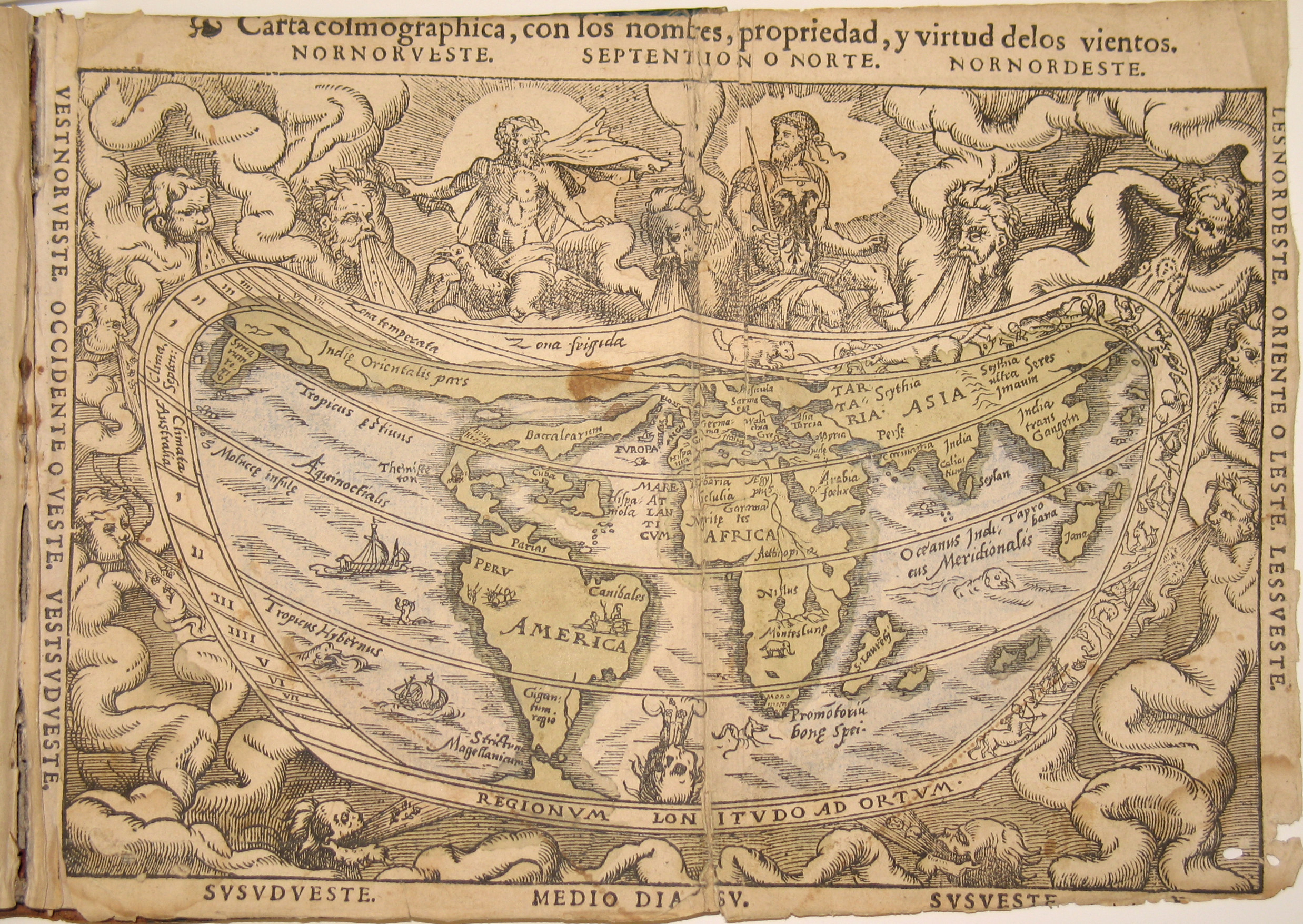
Carta Cosmographica, 1544

== See also ==
- Triangulation by Gemma Frisius
