= Akkrum =

- Village
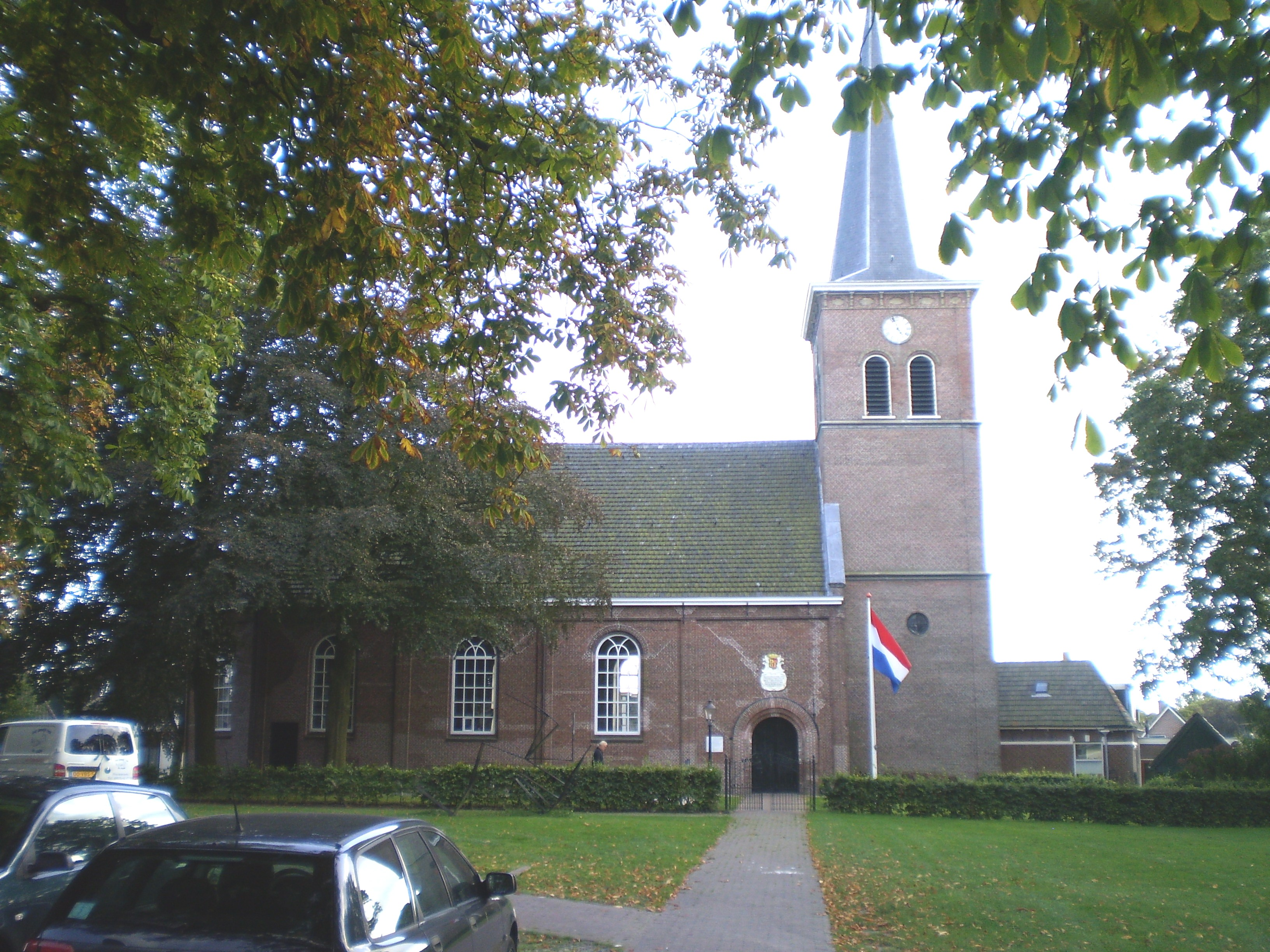
- Akkrum church

- Flag Coat of arms

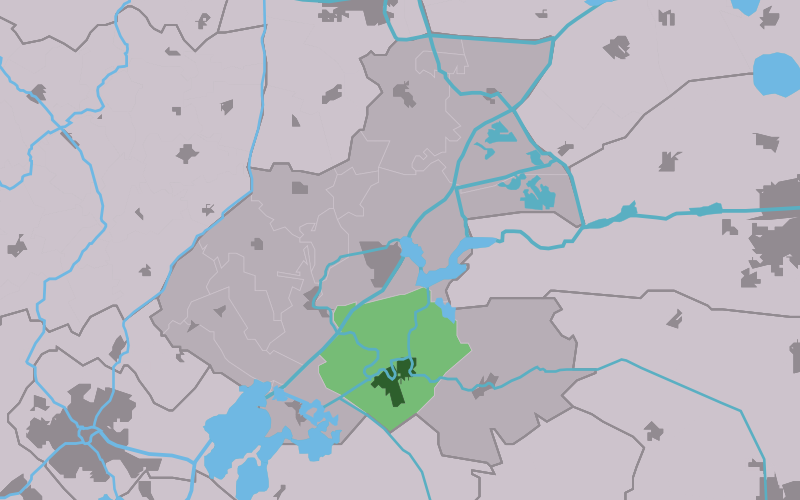
- Location in the former Boarnsterhim municipality

- Location in the Netherlands Akkrum (Netherlands)
- Country: Netherlands
- Province: Friesland
- Municipality: Heerenveen

Area
  - Total: 11.92 km^{2} (4.60 sq mi)
- Elevation: 0.3 m (0.98 ft)

Population (2021)
  - Total: 3,300
  - Density: 280/km^{2} (720/sq mi)
- Time zone: UTC+1 (CET)
  - Summer (DST): UTC+2 (CEST)
- Postal code: 8491
- Dialing code: 0566

Akkrum is a village in the Dutch province of Friesland. It is located in the municipality Heerenveen, about 17 km south of the city of Leeuwarden.

Akkrum had about 3,395 inhabitants in 2017.

== History ==
The village was first mentioned in 1315 as Ackrom. The etymology is unclear. Akkrum started as a terp (artificial living mound) village, and developed into a linear settlement which served as the regional centre. It started to grow when the main road Leeuwarden-Zwolle and later a railway line were built next to Akkrum. The Dutch Reformed church was built in 1759 as a replacement of a medieval church. The tower dates from 1882. In 1840, Akkrum was home to 1,121 people.

The polder mill Mellemolen was built in 1849 to drain excess water from the Polslootpolder. In 1972, the mill was toppled in a storm, and restored in 1976. The mill was surrounded by industry and it was moved two kilometers in 2003 to 2004. It only operates on a voluntary basis.

Before 2014, Akkrum was part of the Boarnsterhim municipality and before 1984 it was part of Utingeradeel.

== Transportation ==
Akkrum has a railway station - Akkrum railway station - with services to Leeuwarden, Zwolle, Amersfoort and Amsterdam Airport Schiphol.

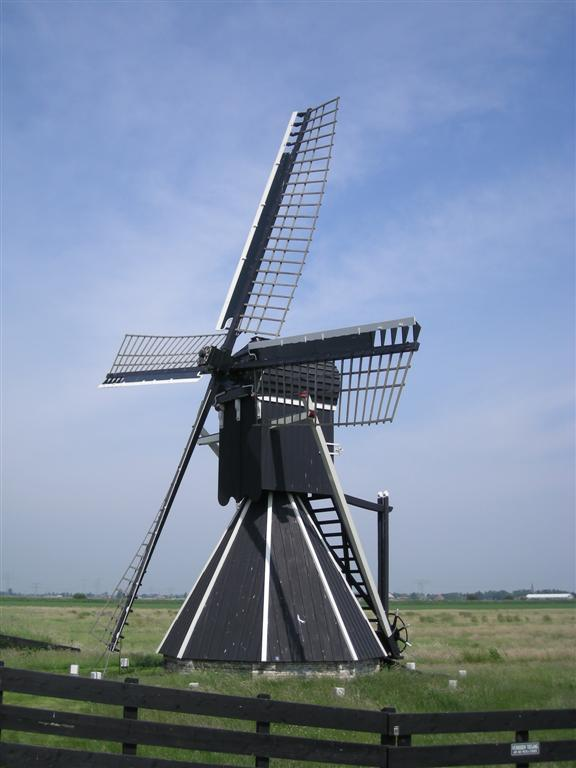
Mellemolen

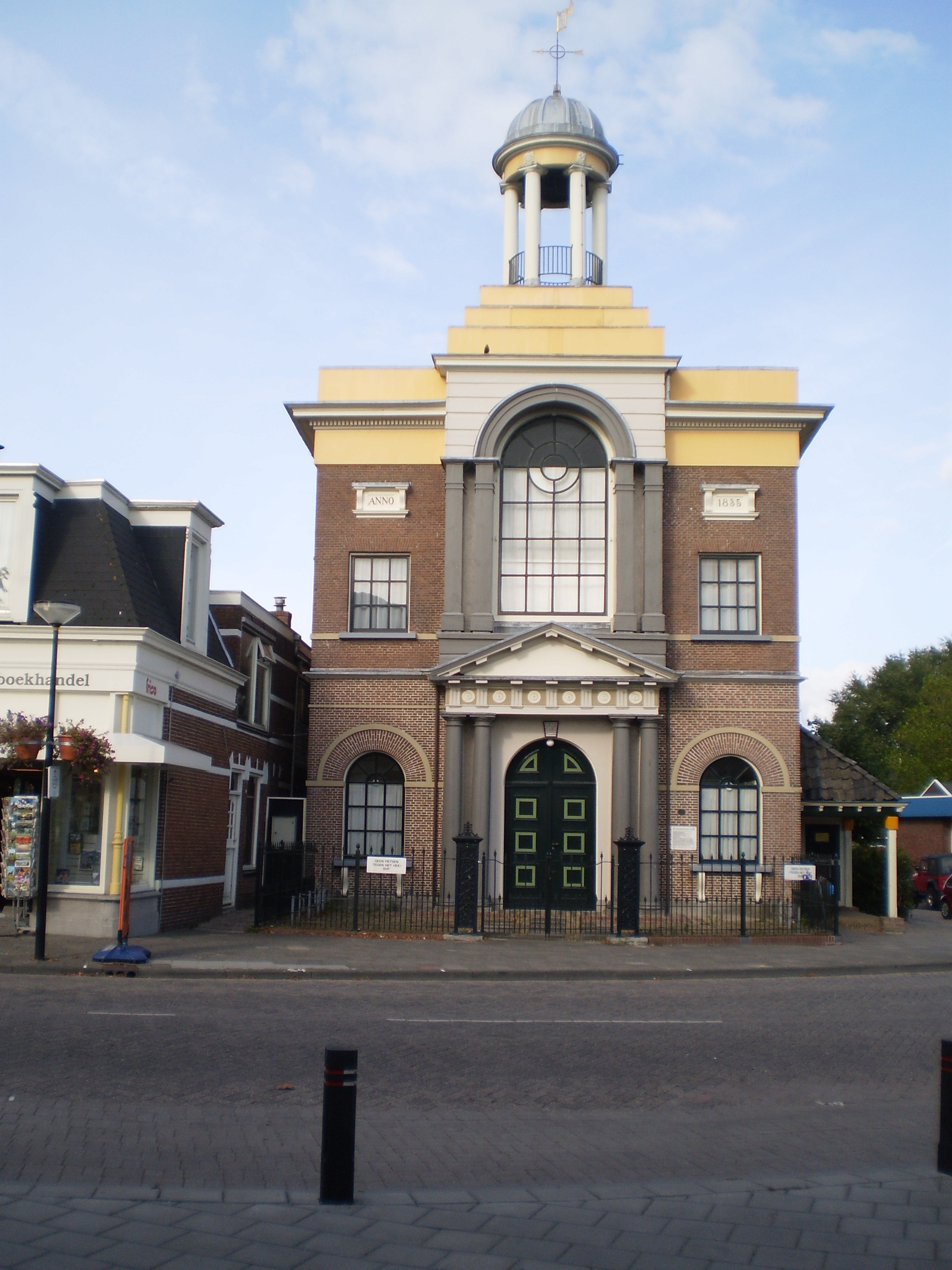
Baptist church

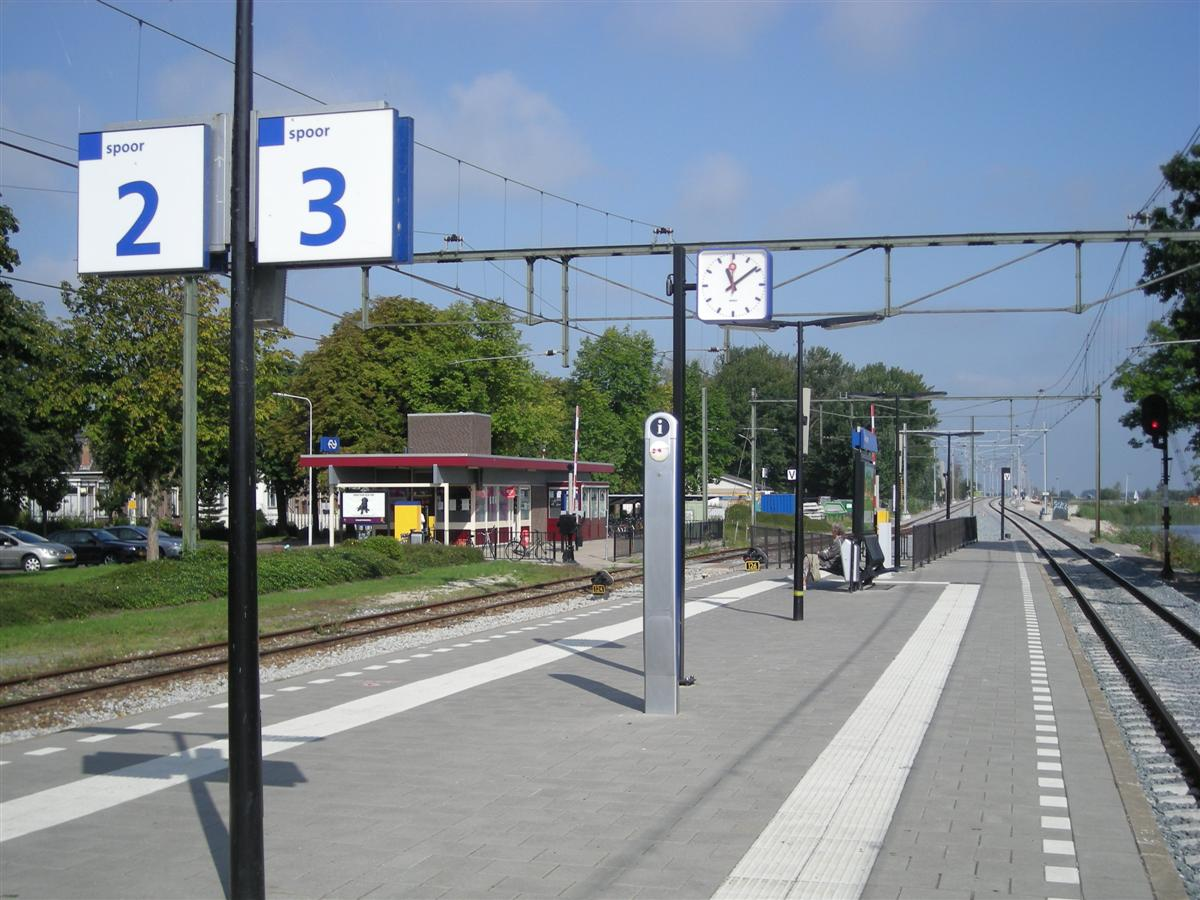
Railway station

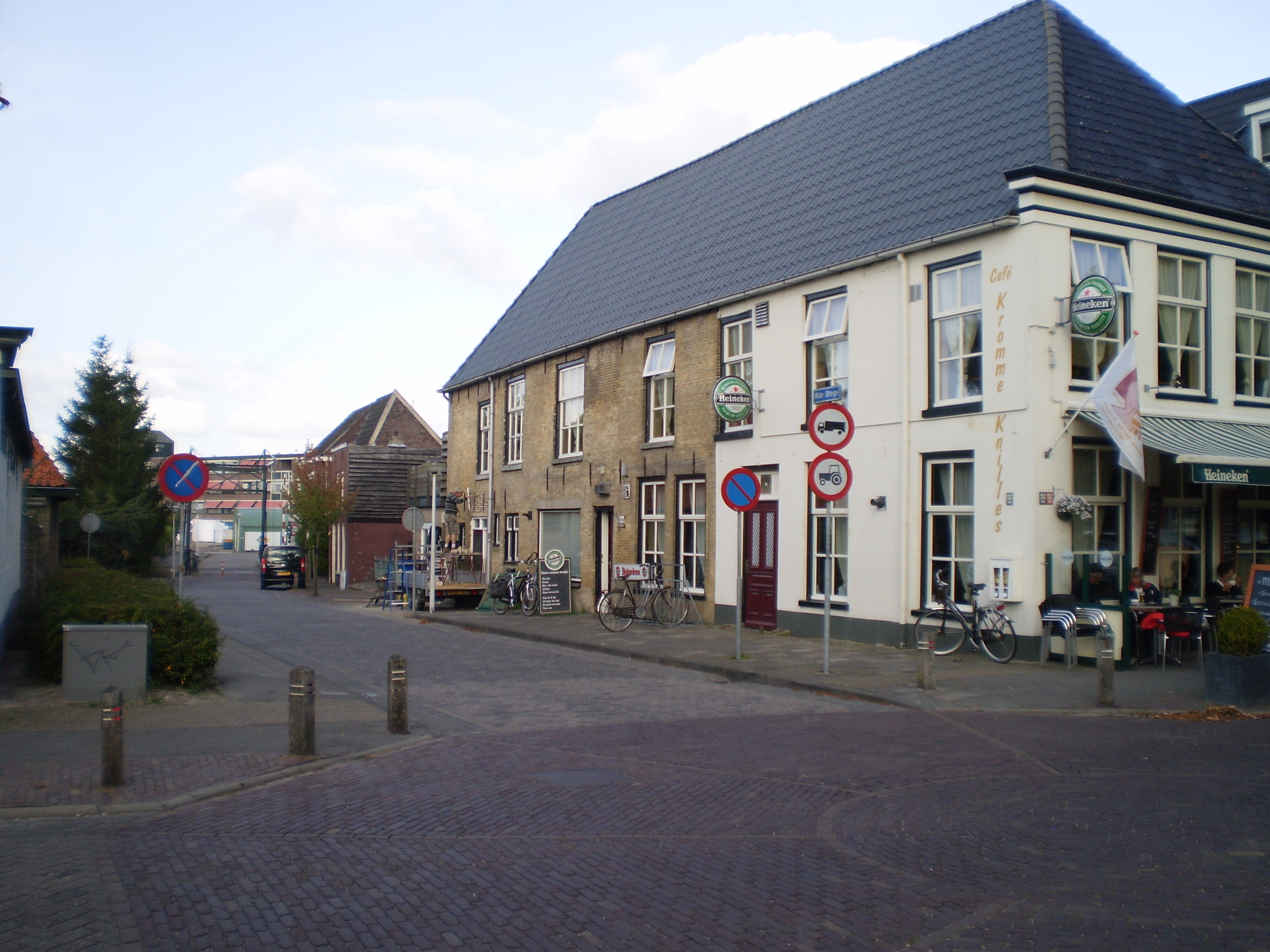
Street view
