= Kölnisches Stadtmuseum =

Museum in Cologne

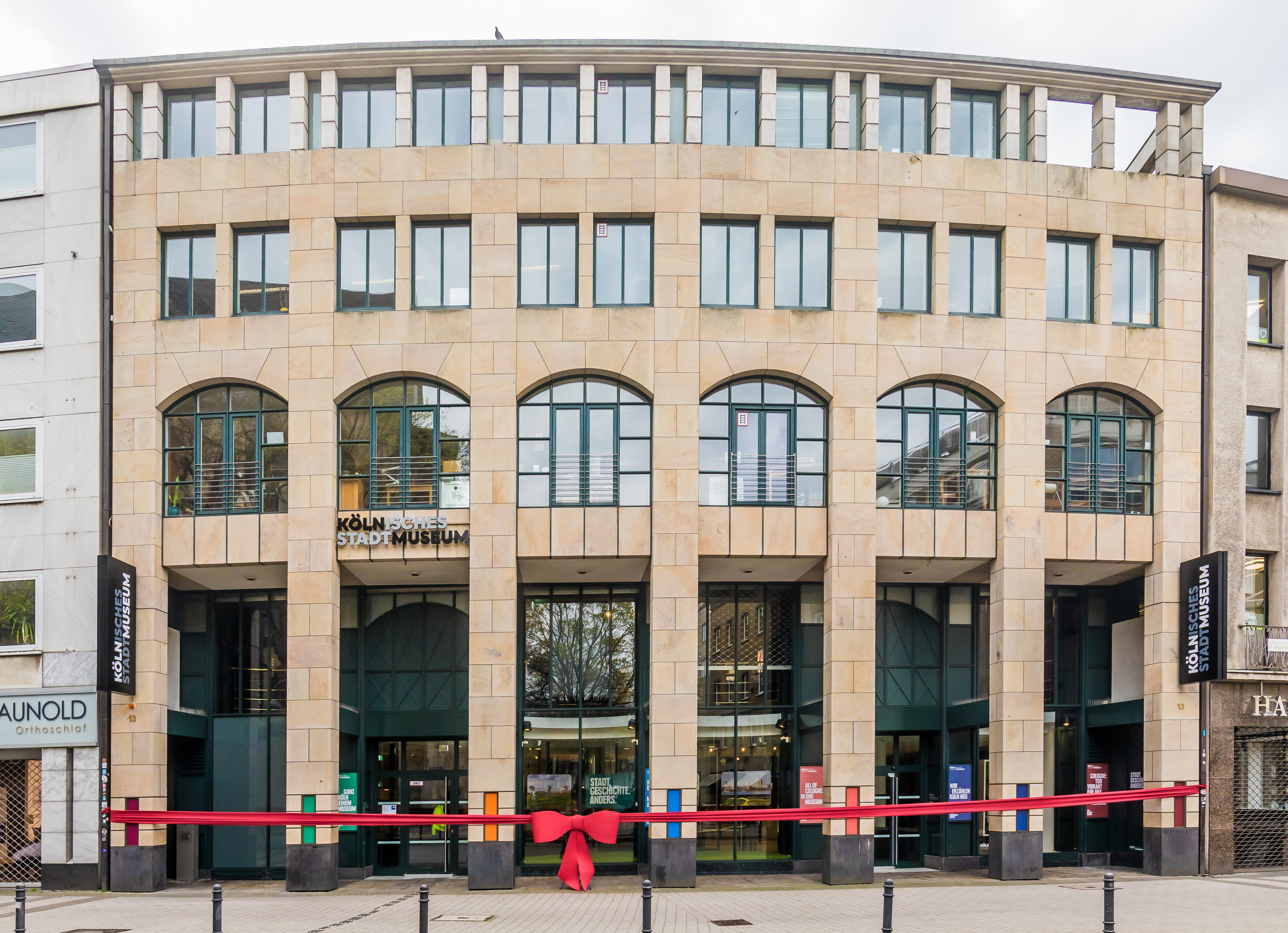
- Reopening of Kölnisches Stadtmuseum
- Established: 1888
- Location: Cologne
- Coordinates: 50°56′20.40″N 6°57′15.41″E
- Type: History museum
- Director: Matthias Hamann
- Website: www.koelnisches-stadtmuseum.de

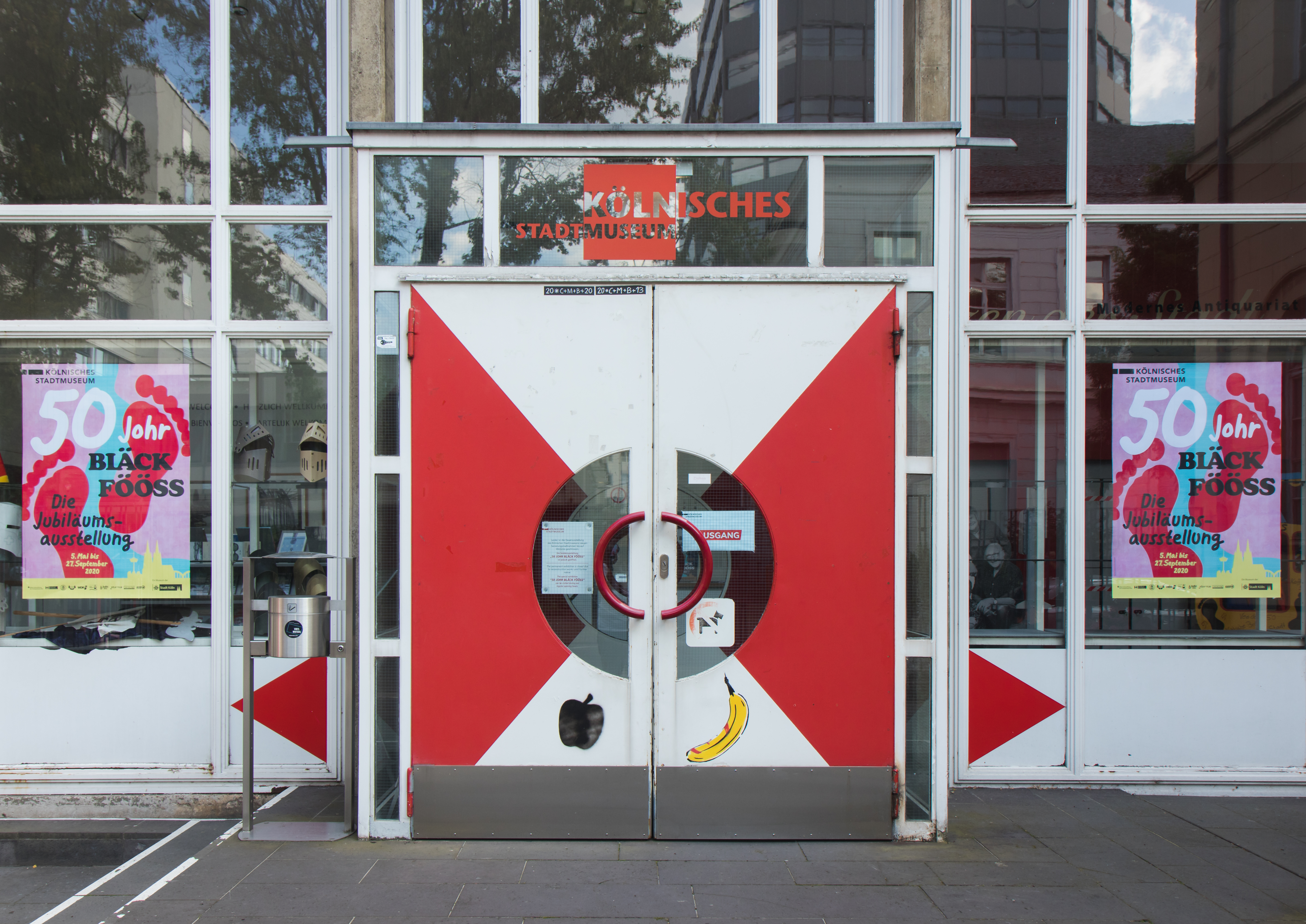
Entrance area with banana graffiti by Thomas Baumgärtel, in 2020

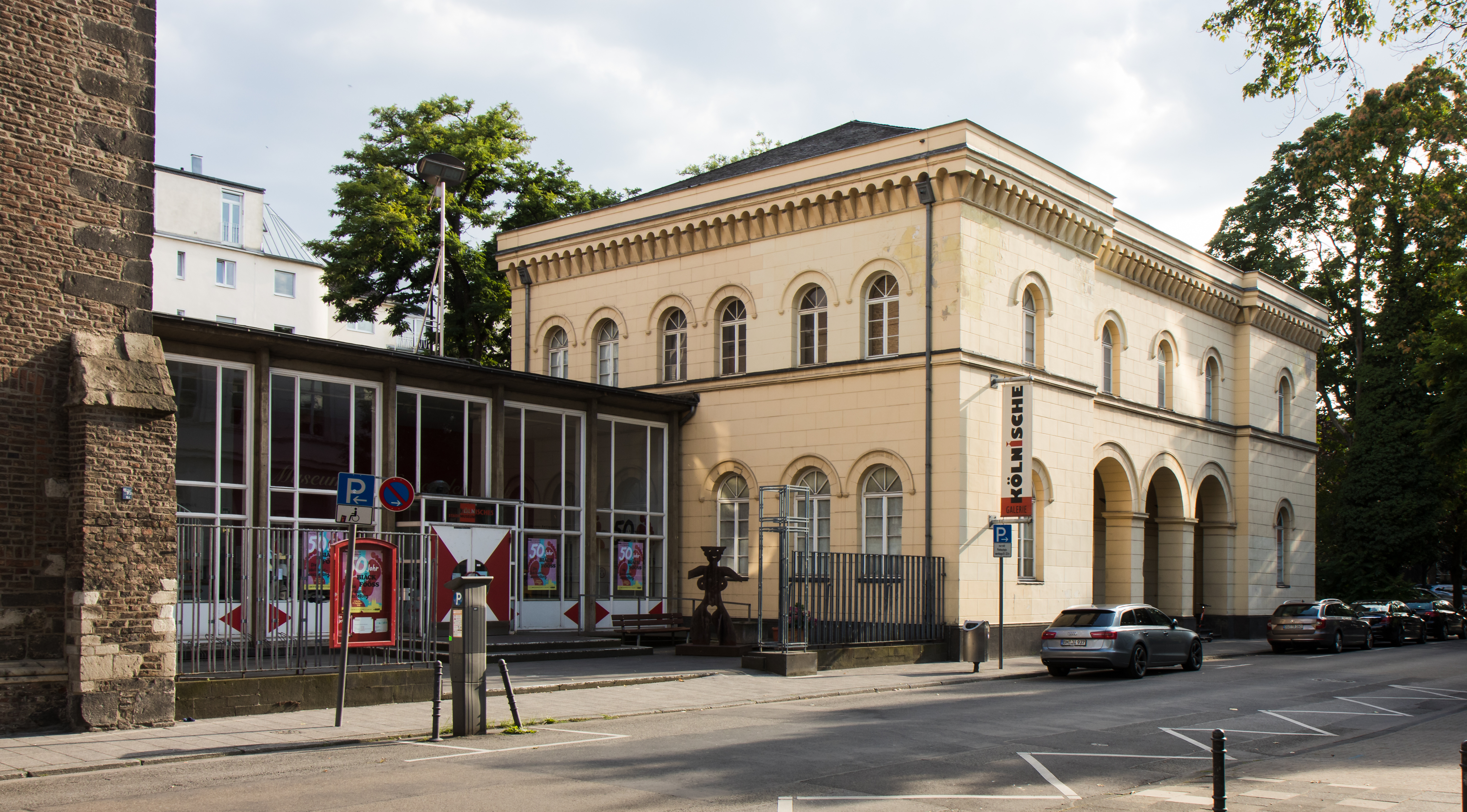
Alte Wache with special exhibition areas, in 2020

The Kölnische Stadtmuseum is the municipal history museum of Cologne, North Rhine-Westphalia, Germany. It is housed in the former Franz Sauer fashion house since March 2024, which has been completely remodelled for the museum. The site is centrally located between the Minorite Church, Museum Kolumba and Breite Straße.

Its collection includes around 350,000 objects from the Middle Ages to the immediate present. The holdings range from the city seal from 1268 to paintings and graphics, militaria, coins, textiles, furniture and everyday objects to material evidence of current Cologne events. Social, economic and cultural history of the last 1200 years can thus be explored both on the individual object and in thematic depth. With the 2024 concept, only a small part of the collection can be made accessible to the public, but it will be placed in the context of cross-epochal emotions that form a central part of the permanent exhibition and deal with social and historical themes in a different way than usual.

In its more than 130-year history, the Stadtmuseum has resided under different names and in different buildings in the city area. The current location is also only temporary after the historic armoury building, which has been in use since 1958, had to be vacated in 2017 due to water damage and only the adjacent Alte Wache could be used for special exhibitions. It was reopened in the former Sauer fashion house in March 2024.

Annual visits to the old site, with its massive restrictions, last totalled 19,832 (2018). Unlike in other cities, about half of the audience is registered in Cologne, which has been interpreted as an indication of Cologne's attachment to its homeland. Thus the current museum concept, with its emotionalising approach, explicitly sees its role as "creating identity for urban society".

== History ==
=== Beginnings ===
At the end of the 19th century, only the Wallraf–Richartz Museum, founded in 1827 and based on the collection of Ferdinand Franz Wallraf, existed as a universal museum – this is considered Cologne's oldest museum. Even before its foundation, weapons and armour that had been taken out of service as well as all kinds of "antiquities" were presented in the armoury. These objects also found their way into the Wallraf-Richartz-Museum via the Wallraf Collection.

Many smaller cities founded historical museums at the end of the 19th century as a result of growing civic commitment – including the Märkisches Museum in Berlin, München and, as early as 1974, the Stadtmuseum in Düsseldorf. It was in times of growing bourgeois historical consciousness the memory of the "old" Cologne, which grew into a modern metropolis during the Industrialization in Germany, and the documentation or preservation of historical buildings and objects. Parallel to the efforts for the historical museum, a Museum of Decorative Arts was also created, which opened only a few weeks before the new history museum.

=== Foundation and first years ===
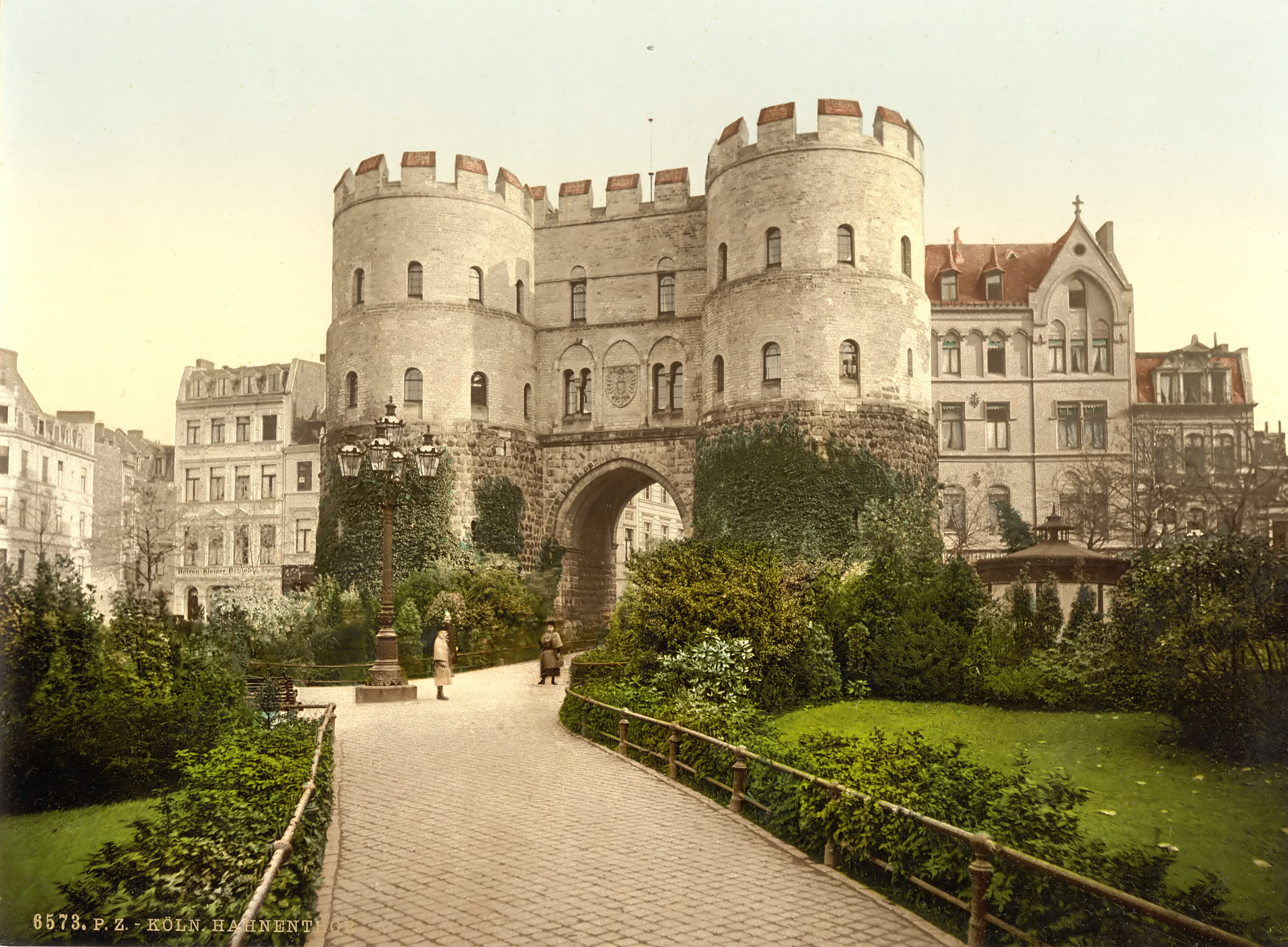
First site: Hahnentorburg (c. 1900)

When the Hahnentorburg, part of the medieval city fortifications, was renovated in 1888 as part of the city expansion to form Kölner Neustadt, the question of the building's use came up. One proposal concerned the storage of the model collection of the Cologne Cathedral; however, the plan of the archive director Konstantin Höhlbaum to set up the long-overdue historical museum in the Torburg was successful. In addition, the Wallraf-Richartz-Museum wanted to specialise more in paintings and parts of its collection needed a new location – both decorative arts and those more suitable for the history museum, such as a coin collection. So on 13 July, the Stadtverordnetenversammlung decided to found a historical museum, which then opened on 14 August 1888.

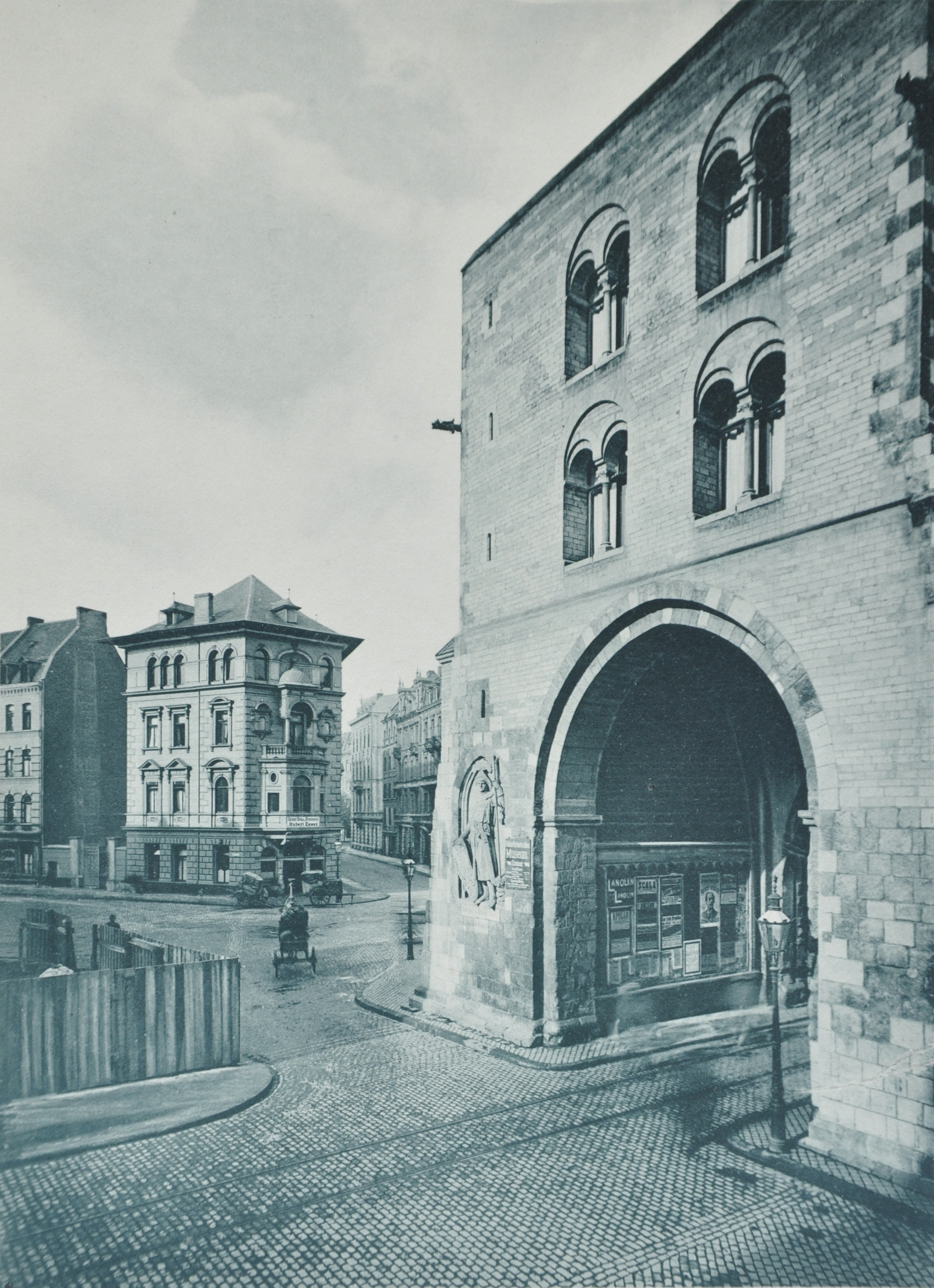
Further location: Eigelsteintorburg, 1896

Arthur Pabst, the director of the new Kunsthistorisches Museum, took over the management – on a part-time or honorary basis – until his early retirement in 1894. However, the institution was clearly shaped by his successor Joseph Hansen, who also worked in a dual function as director of the archive and was thus able to systematically process the collection holdings and their inner connections: documents and manuscripts in the archive, "pictorial and figurative illustrative material" into the museum. His museum concept is considered by the current director Mario Kramp to be thoroughly modern, as he went beyond the local consideration of Cologne; he considered research, publication and mediation to be equally the task of his institution. Hansen was director until 1924 and managed, for example, to gain the Eigelsteintorburg as a second location in 1902. Although this was not considered optimal, it allowed for a somewhat larger permanent exhibition. Since there was no depot, the substructures of the showcases were used as cabinets for coins and parts of the graphic collection.

Two major special exhibitions ("Old and New Cologne") were held in 1913 and 1914 in the halls of the Sonderbund exhibition. The historical city model was also created at this time and remains one of the most important exhibits in the permanent exhibition to this day. A proposal by Hansen in 1912 to house the holdings in a larger context in the Zeughaus as a central museum building could not be realised in the following years due to the World War, among other things. By the First World War, however, the History Museum had established itself in such a way that it could consistently record around 20,000 visits annually.

=== Rheinisches Museum in Deutz ===
At the beginning of 1925, the historical museum was given a full-time director for the first time in the person of Wilhelm Ewald. In the same year, the monumental Jahrtausendausstellung der Rheinlande in the Deutz exhibition halls attracted 1.3 million visitors. This gave rise to the plan for a Rhine History or Rhenish Museum under Lord Mayor Konrad Adenauer. This was also to be set up on the right bank of the river in the former barracks of the Deutz cuirassiers and take over the holdings of the millennium exhibition.

The official decision to found the new museum was taken by the Cologne City Council on 1 April 1926. In the same year, Wilhelm Ewald – who was appointed director – presented an "extremely ambitious and progressive museum concept for its time". In addition to a display collection for the "uprooted [...] masses", the concept emphasised the museum's task as a scientific and educational institution. In terms of time, Ewald spanned from prehistory to the present, and spatially beyond the borders of the Rhine Province, taking into account the diverse relationships with neighbouring regions. Thematically, eight sections were to cover a comprehensive spectrum including fauna and flora, geology and geography in addition to historical representations. The concept also included the Rheinisches Bildarchiv for a graphic and photographic collection as well as a Rhenish Library. Konrad Adenauer appealed to the provincial administration for financial subsidies for the new museum, but without forfeiting his own influence.

Initially, however, the intended premises were used in 1928 for the PRESSA exhibition, which was mainly located on the neighbouring exhibition grounds. For this purpose, the architect Adolf Abel redesigned the building with two neoclassical wing buildings connected to each other. It offered 10,000 m^{2} of exhibition space and 4,000 m^{2} of storage space.

At the same time, the historical museum on the left bank of the Rhine also developed new exhibition concepts for which the space available in the two Torburgen was no longer sufficient. By 1930, the collection areas had been expanded to include the ecclesiastical and economic development of the city as well as public life and administration. Although Ewald was director of both institutions, he pleaded – unlike others – for their independence, since the History Museum was considerably more focused on Cologne than could be possible in a regional museum. It was therefore considered, for example, to move the historical museum into the rooms of the Wallraf-Richartz-Museum when the latter was to receive a new building. A concept demanded by Adenauer for the reorganisation of all collections, taking into account the Rhenish Museum, dragged on – apparently also due to wrangling over competences between the directors. Finally, the funds earmarked for the expansion of the two museums had to be saved due to the Great Depression.

In the meantime, a considerable part of the historical museum's collection had been transferred to the Deutz rooms due to the lack of space, as had large parts of the staff. It was soon only a small step before the two museums were united; only the small independent department "Cologne as a Prussian garrison and fortress" remained in the Eigelsteintorburg. Incidentally, the Rhenish Museum, which also took over holdings from other municipal buildings, was never officially opened. The actual History Museum, initially still with its own budget and staff, was eventually "absorbed" by the Rhenish Museum (depending on how it was read) or "sunk" in it.

=== House of the Rhenish Homeland, under the Nazi regime ===
Despite taking over diverse collection holdings, the rooms of the Rhenish Museum had never been completely furnished. From 1933, however, parts of the exhibition as well as several special exhibitions could be opened to the public. The museum, now united in Deutz, retained its director Ewald after the seizure of power by the National Socialists. Shortly before its opening, it was given the new name "Haus der Rheinischen Heimat" (House of the Rhenish Homeland) and was inaugurated on 21 May 1936 in the presence of Gauleiter Josef Grohé and Joseph Goebbels (at the same time as the Reichsautobahn section Cologne-Düsseldorf) was inaugurated.

On 6000 square metres, developments since the year 800 in the Rhineland were illuminated in five large departments and around 150 rooms. Prehistory and early history, natural history and, in the ecclesiastical section, the presentation of Judaism with its "extraordinary" collection of Judaica had to be abandoned.

Ewald's basic museum concept fitted into the National Socialist, völkisch propaganda strategy, as a result of which it finally received unexpected support from the new rulers after years of pressure from Lord Mayor Adenauer – after the latter had already been dismissed from office in March 1933. The Political Department planned by Ewald in 1933 could not be realised until the opening; he initially limited himself to the Representation of the National Socialist Movement in the Rhineland, which corresponded to the National Socialist minimum requirement for a museum of local history. However, this too was not complete by the time of the opening. In the following years, the exhibition became increasingly political and the museum policy more opportunistic, which was reflected in propaganda exhibitions such as "Das wehrhafte Deutschland" (1936), "Volksgemeinschaft – Wehrgemeinschaft" (1937). However, these special exhibitions were only partly curated by the museum itself; for the most part, the museum merely provided the rooms for exhibition organisers from various organisations.

Beatrix Alexander from the Stadtmuseum pointed out in 1992 that even in the permanent exhibition the presentation of recent history from 1848 to the remilitarization of the Rhineland followed the National Socialist historical perspective. Apparently, in the years that followed, both visitor numbers and the planned publication activity after the opening of the museum fell far short of the goals and expectations.

With the beginning of the Second World War, individual, particularly valuable pieces were gradually removed from storage without significantly affecting the overall exhibition. From 1942 onwards, the municipal museums closed their permanent exhibitions; the "Haus der Rheinischen Heimat" was the last to remain open. One of the last special exhibitions before the closure due to the war showed works by the sculptor Arno Breker in 1943. At that time, the building had already suffered damage from Allied air raids.

A remarkable detail from this chapter of the museum are the unrealised plans for the construction of the monumental National Socialist Gauforum on an area of 300,000 square metres, for which most of Cologne-Deutz would have had to give way. The "Haus der Rheinischen Heimat" and the neighbouring Museum Schnütgen were not (or no longer) included in these plans. In addition, in the context of continuing discussions on the restructuring of Cologne's museum landscape, there were also thoughts of dissolving the museum or dividing it up among other institutions, which Ewald naturally opposed.

=== Post-war period: Rheinisches und Historisches Museum ===
In the immediate post-war years, the first task was to bring the outsourced holdings back to Cologne – partly with the support of the US Kunstschutz. Wilhelm Ewald was in Gaibach at the end of the war and negotiated with the occupation authorities himself. Since most of the museum buildings had been destroyed, interim depots were later set up in the city and the surrounding area.

Ewald remained in office as director until 1950 – beyond his retirement age. He was the only Cologne museum director not to have joined the NSDAP and was immediately confirmed in office in 1945. A historiographical study of his role over three eras is still pending; In her dissertation from 2016, the cultural scientist Karin Hieke cites circumstantial evidence for a possible system-critical stance on Ewald's part; in addition to his non-partisanship, she mentions the fact that he saved the Judaica collection from destruction. The long-time museum employee Franz Brill was appointed as his successor in 1950.

The first major historical exhibition in post-war Cologne – "Cologne 1900 Years a City" – was organised to mark the anniversary of the granting of city rights, the Ius Italicum, from 26 May to 22 August 1950 in the Staatenhaus am Rheinpark of the Koelnmesse. It was part of pompous celebrations that staged Cologne's identity under the motto Cologne is back (omitting the twelve years from 1933 to 1945). Organised by Wilhelm Ewald and Bruno Kuske, who had also curated the Millennium Exhibition in 1924, the exhibition attracted 250,000 visitors, but also recorded a deficit of DM 671,000. On the other hand, this exhibition also delayed the complete repatriation of the removed holdings to Deutz, which was not finally completed until 1953.

The institution, now called the Rheinisches und Historisches Museum, opened on 26 June 1953, initially in the refurbished 14 rooms on 1000 square metres in Deutz and concentrated conceptually again primarily on Cologne as the metropolis of the Rhineland.

=== Kölnisches Stadtmuseum in Zeughaus ===
Efforts to move the museum back to Cologne on the left bank of the Rhine had already been underway since the end of the war. The Zeughaus (built 1594–1606) had been burnt down to its foundation walls and vaulted arches and had to be extensively renovated after it was transferred from federal to municipal ownership. By 1956, this had been done to the extent that it could house an exhibition on the occasion of the 77th Katholikentag. The intermediate building was completely rebuilt and the adjoining Alte Wache (Old Guardhouse) renovated; the latter, however, was initially used by the Roman-Germanic Museum from 1959. The opening of the now once again renamed Kölnisches Stadtmuseum – in terms of exhibition technology as "modern [...] as was museum and financially justifiable" – was celebrated on 11 January 1958. In addition to its own holdings, it continued to house the Rheinisches Bildarchiv until 1981.

Franz Brill, who retired in 1965, did not think the new location had much of a future, however, as it did not meet the space requirements. In addition, the armoury had to be vacated for the first time in 1963/64 for the major "Monumenta Judaica" exhibition.

On the other hand, towards the middle of the 1970s, the rooms of the Alte Wache could be used as a special exhibition space after the Roman-Germanic Museum had moved into its new building. Branch offices were established in 1971 and 1981 with the Prussian semaphore system in Flittard (until 2005) and the Wehrturm Zündorf. The new director from 1966 was Günther Albrecht, on whose initiative the "Freunde des Kölnischen Stadtmuseums" support association was founded in 1968. After Albrecht's death in 1974, Hugo Borger took over as interim director of the Cologne museums, and from 1976 the archaeologist Heiko Steuer.

Another closure took place in 1980 for the Tutankhamun exhibition, after which the permanent exhibition remained closed for almost five years for alterations and a new conception. Conceptual modernisations had already taken place since the 1970s; however, the reconstruction after the Tutankhamun exhibition dragged on, with the situation exacerbated by a (mild) fire in the roof trusses in 1983. The promised funds of DM 7 million were cut to DM 1 million, and air-conditioning was still not installed. Other necessary extensions – such as the expansion of the depot areas on a farm in Bocklemünd – also remained stuck in the planning phase.

It was not until 1984 that museum operations were resumed in the Zeughaus, albeit still in cramped quarters that required conceptual compromises. For the next 25 years, Werner Schäfke took over as director. The museum concept developed by him and his predecessor (backward chronological entry, thematic islands) corresponded to the current standards of the time. Although it was selectively expanded and supplemented in the following decades, for example at the beginning of the 1980s with the Nazi period, it was never fundamentally reorganised. Emphasis was placed on educational work, museum education and a new staging of the historical city model.

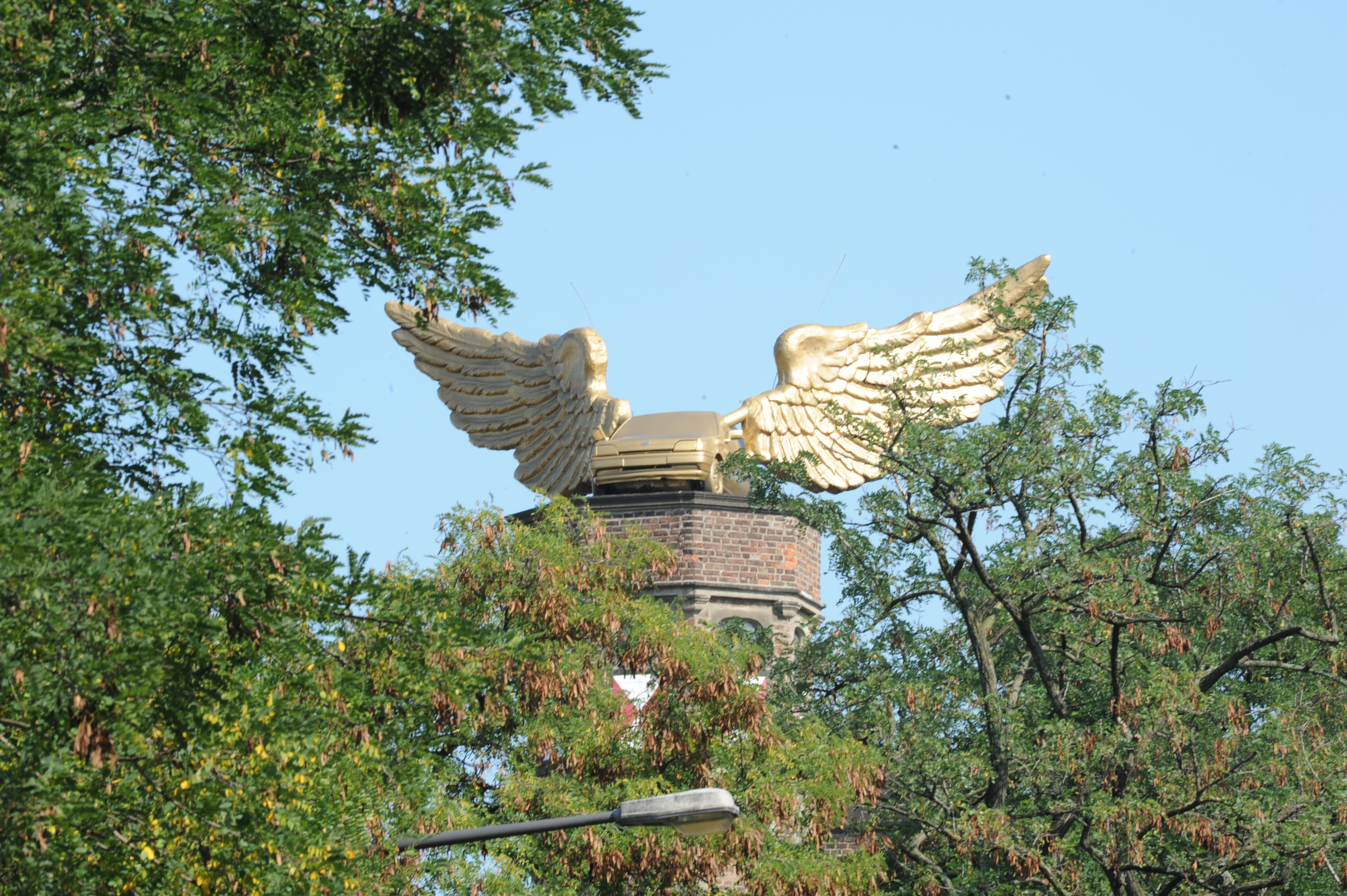
Flügelauto 1991 by HA Schult (photo: 2011)

The installation of the "Goldenen Vogels" (colloquially: winged car) by the artist HA Schult on the roof of the Zeughaus tower caused a sensation in 1991.

The Schäfke era also saw major special exhibitions, which at that time could still be held in the Josef Haubrich Kunsthalle at Neumarkt. The exhibition The Rift in Heaven: Clemens August and his Era was presented in 2000 at the Augustusburg and Falkenlust Palaces, Brühl. Schäfke published large inventory catalogues and, together with the NS Documentation Centre of the City of Cologne, worked on the topic of crimes of the Wehrmacht, which was much discussed because of the Wehrmacht Exhibition in 1999.

=== 21st century, plans for new location ===
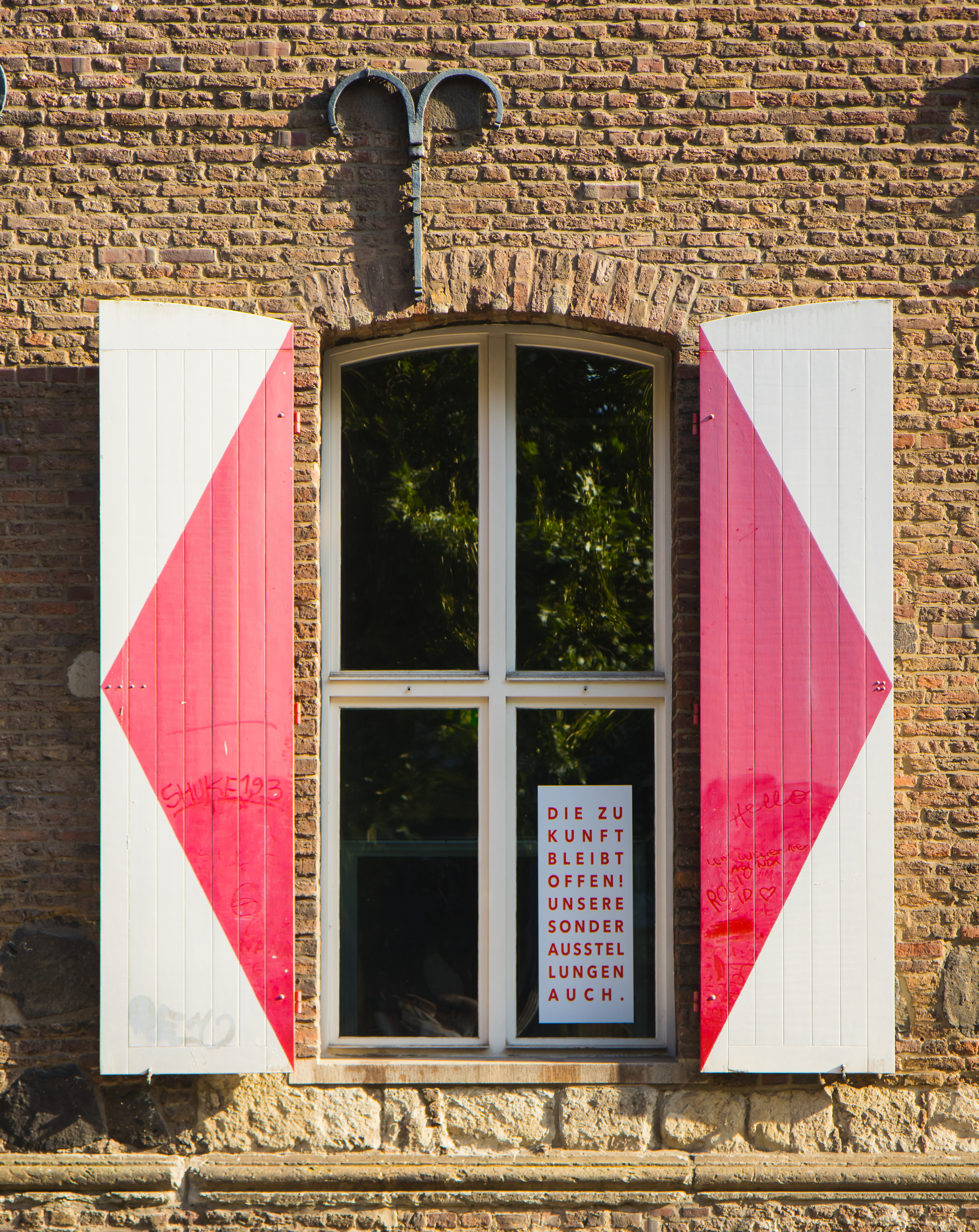
As of 2020: Restriction to special exhibitions

A visible "rejuvenation" was achieved from 2007 onwards through the renewal of the guard concept and increased cooperation with the University of Cologne, which thus also contributes to the museum's work in terms of content – for example with guided tours.

In order to put an end to the cramped conditions and the now desolate state of the technical equipment and building fabric, work began in 2003 on the concept for a renovation and an extension to be built on a neighbouring property that had been exchanged with the state of North Rhine-Westphalia. A pair of donors, who were supported for this purpose in 2003/2004 by the deputy director Michael Euler-Schmidt wanted to contribute 5.5 million euros and have a significant influence on the architecture. The conflict between the requirements of public procurement law and the wishes of the founding couple could not be resolved in the end, however, so the offer was withdrawn in 2009. The plans were not completely abandoned even by the new director Mario Kramp, who took office in 2010; in 2011 he presented a feasibility and concept study that also assumed an extension building. Two years later, there was a competition for the renovation and extension of the building.

However, these plans were discarded in favour of a completely new concept, which Lord Mayor Jürgen Roters presented in March 2014: After the planned demolition of the Curia House at Roncalliplatz – a prominent location on the south side of Cologne Cathedral – a new building complex is to be constructed here in cooperation with the cathedral chapter to house the Stadtmuseum, together with the Cathedral Construction Archive, workshops and administration of the Cathedral Chapter. At the same time as the renovation of the neighbouring Roman-Germanic Museum, whose administrative rooms are also to be expanded, a new "historical centre" with three institutions is thus to be created in the immediate city centre. In a Europe-wide architectural competition, the design by the Berlin architectural office of Volker Staab won first prize in 2016. The planning will be continued with a revised design. In order to act jointly as project promoters, the city and the "Hohe Domkirche" founded a company in April 2020. However, shortly before the planned municipal construction decision in February 2024, the clerical project partner declared that "the previous plans for the new building will no longer be pursued due to the increased costs". The future of the "New Historical Centre" concept, the location on Roncalliplatz and therefore also the new museum location remains open again (as of spring 2024).

In the meantime, the museum's desolate situation escalated when, due to water damage on the upper floor, the permanent exhibition on both floors had to be completely closed since June 2017. Those exhibits that were undamaged were removed from storage. However, a number of special exhibitions have been held in the Alte Wache.

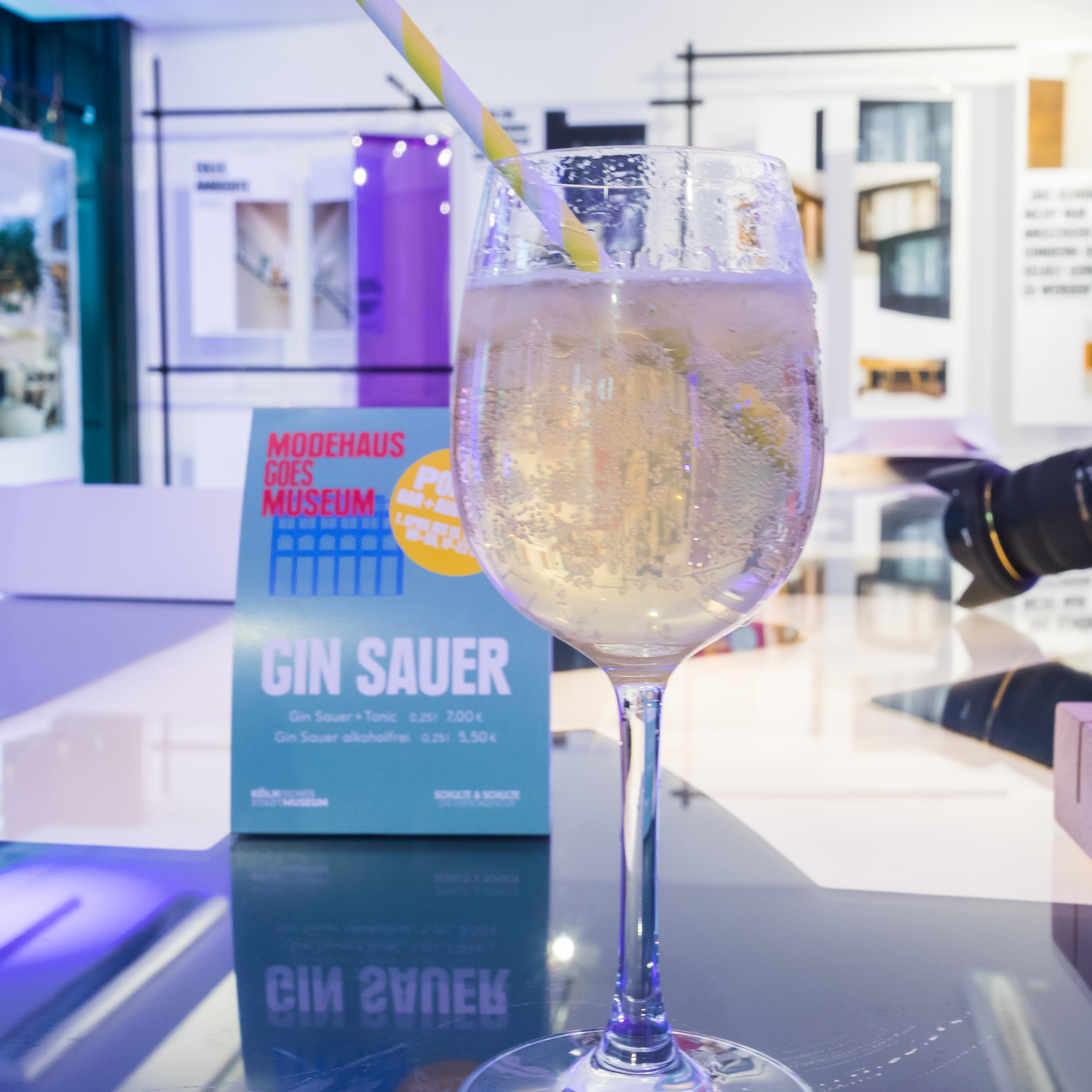
POP-UP! Modehaus goes Museum (2022)

The former department stores' Franz Sauer in the city centre was rented as interim accommodation for ten years. It was anticipated (as of April 2021) that the building would have been available to the museum from the third quarter of 2021 and open in autumn 2022. Due to the impact of the coronavirus pandemic and the Russian invasion of Ukraine on the construction sector, as well as expected supply bottlenecks, the opening date was postponed several times. There were also personnel changes: Director Mario Kramp retired from the management of the museum in 2022; after a transitional period led by Silvia Rückert, art historian Matthias Hamann, until then Head of Museum Services, succeeded him in September 2023.

The curatorial team of the closed museum maintained contact with the public with event formats such as the "POP-UP-Bar", which took place in parts of the former fashion house and accompanied the transformation process under the motto "Modehaus goes Museum". The reopening of the Cologne City Museum was celebrated on 22 March 2024.

=== "Museum in the fashion house" ===
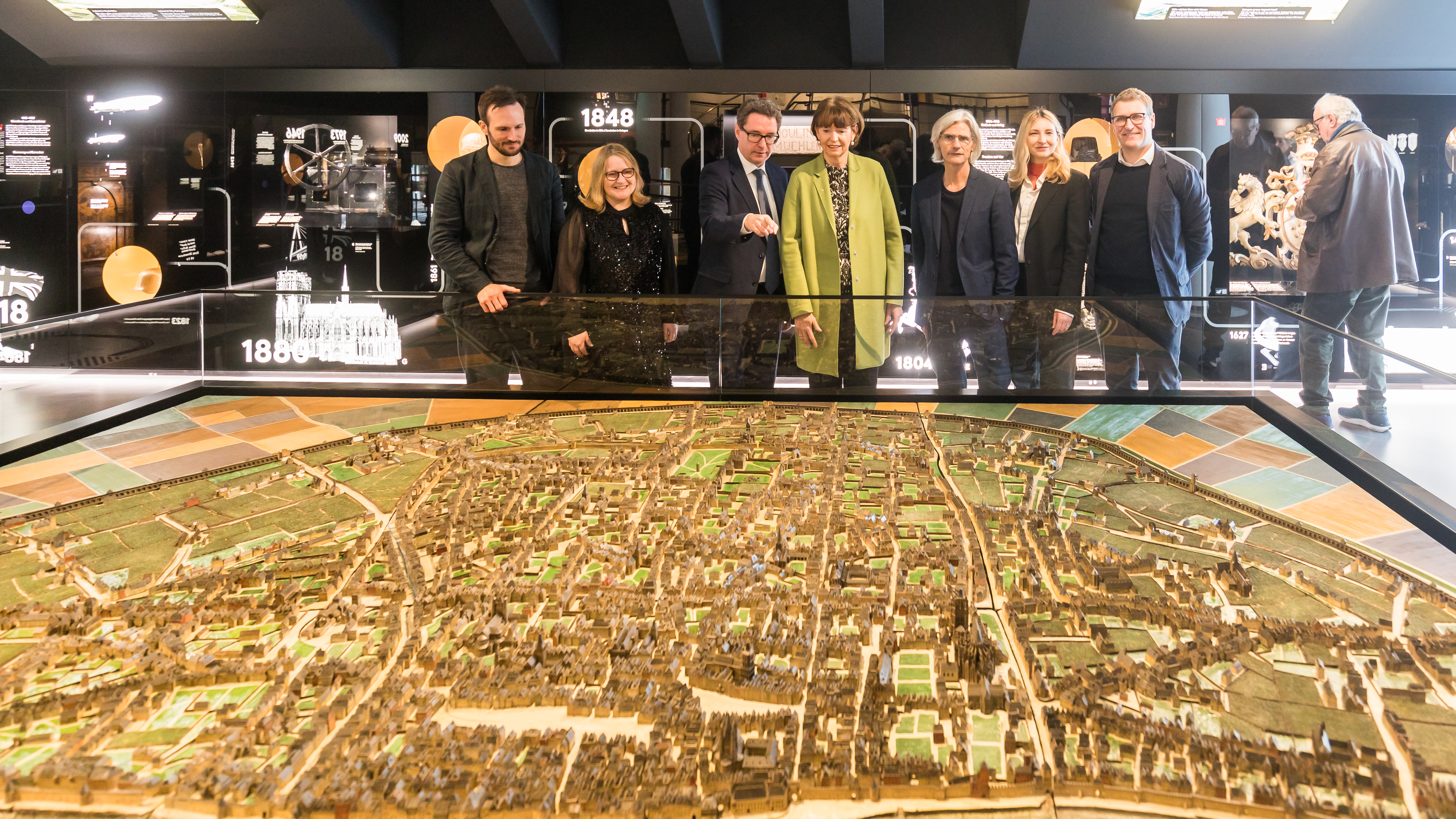
City model in the "Room of City History"

Due to the unusual and very limited space of 750 square metres, new conceptional approaches had to be taken. Only around 700 of the more than 350,000 objects in the collection can be shown. The museum has almost completely abandoned the classic chronological narrative of history and instead opted for an emotionalised approach in which connections are made across epochs and "exciting stories" are told. With bilingual panels throughout, tactile pavings, audio guides, Braille labelling on the exhibits and display cases that are wheelchair-accessible, the aim is to achieve the greatest possible accessibility.

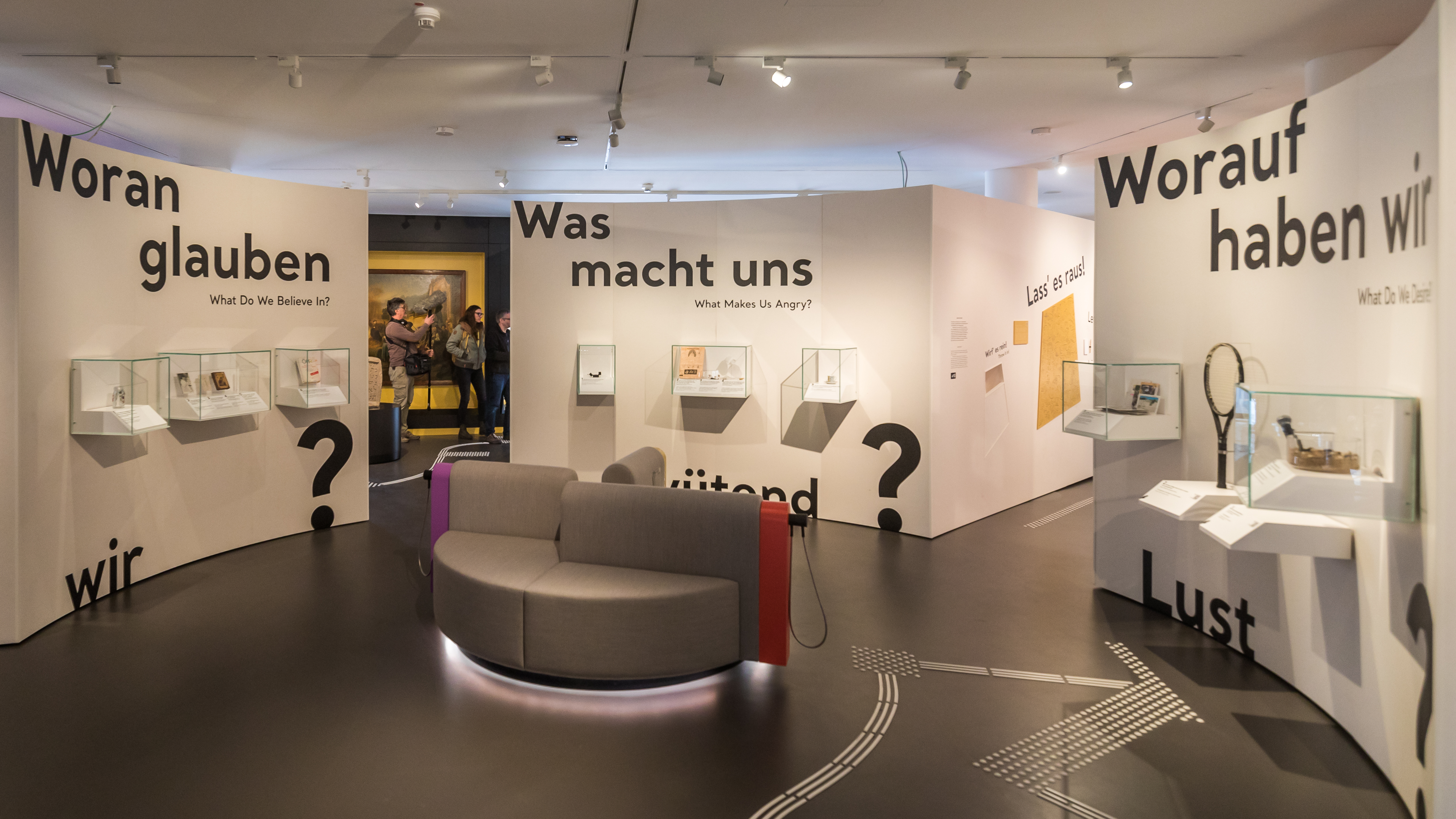
Three of the central question areas

The new permanent exhibition is spread over the five mezzanines of the 1980s building, which are grouped around a central staircase. The central exhibits include the city seal from 1269, the charter from 1396 and the city model in the "Room of City History", where the history of Cologne can be explored in fast-forward ("Cologne in 30 minutes"), supported by augmented reality methods. A reminiscence of the former fashion house can be found in the wall showcases, which contain headgear from different eras, among other objects.

At the heart of the exhibition questions are posed such as "What do we love?", "What frightens us?" and "What connects us?". They are juxtaposed with very different objects in order to encourage visitors to reflect on their own thoughts. Participatory elements, which were created during the conception phase in dialogue with parts of the public, show individual stories and memorabilia that deal with the respective questions. Migration stories and diversity play an important role in many places.

Special exhibitions cannot be realised in the building and it will be looked for an outsourced solution. Instead, the openly accessible foyer – as a so-called open space – can be used for smaller temporary exhibitions and, in particular, for projects by initiatives and civil society organisations in the city to discuss current topics.

== Collection inventory ==
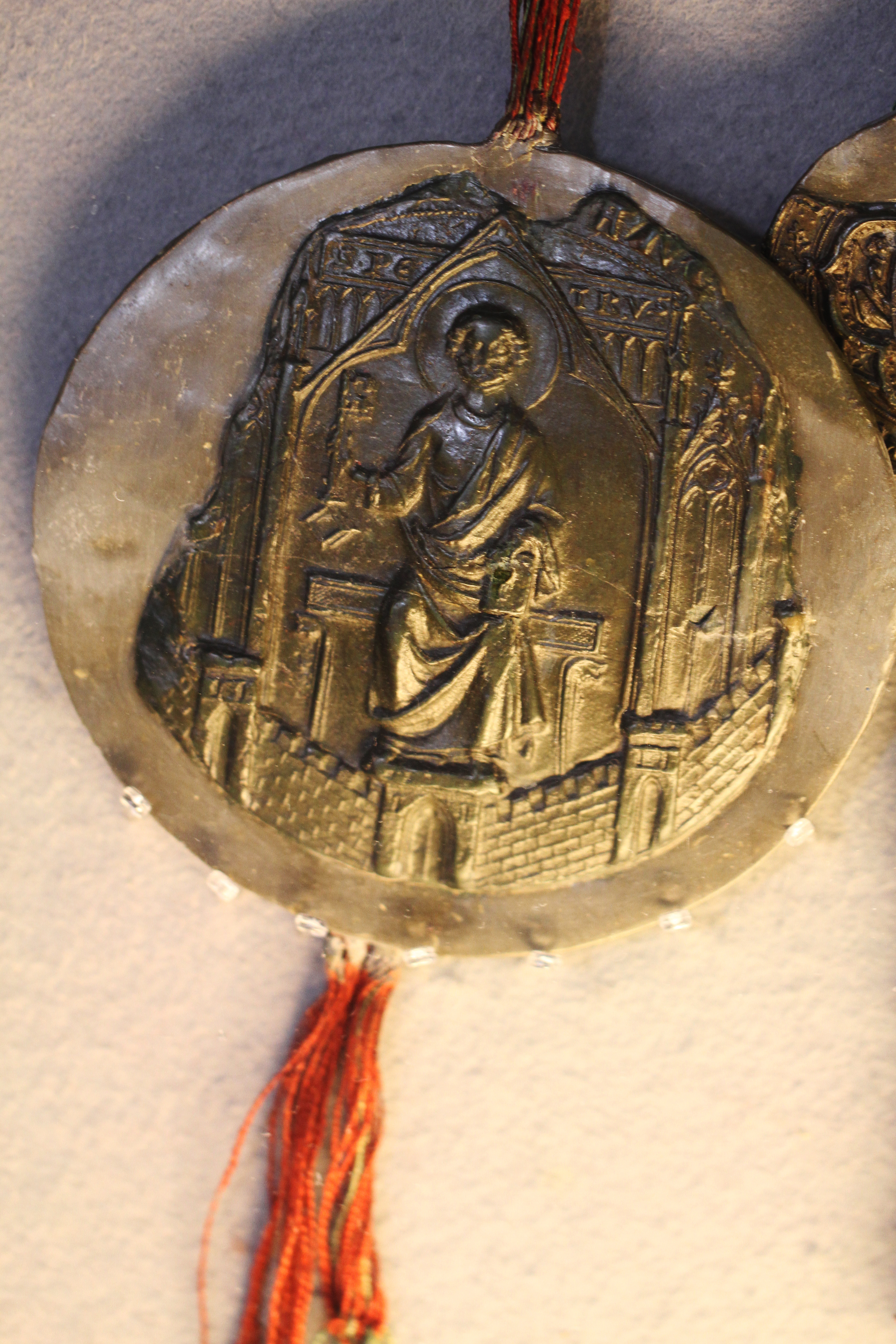
Great Seal of Cologne

The initial furnishings of the historical museum in the Hahnentorburg from 1888 consisted initially of the armoury collection that had been preserved after the French occupation, above all old weapons and armour, scales and weights. Various 'antiquities' and objects such as stamp seals were added from the Council Tower and the City Library. Important objects were taken over from the Historical Archive of the City of Cologne, including the estate of the archbishop's seal keeper Hermann von Goch (executed in 1398) and also probably the oldest Red Fahne of Germany from the Revolutions of 1848. Donations and acquisitions expanded the collection in the following years. The foundation for the graphic collection was laid by the estate of Johann Jakob Merlo, which was expanded in the following years with around a thousand city and Rhineland views. The stock of coins was significantly increased by the purchase from the collection of the Frankfurt numismatist Paul Joseph and others, as well as by the acquisition of archaeological finds from Cologne. In addition to these objects, efforts were made to set up a historical kitchen by acquiring the corresponding equipment, and a section on the Cologne Carnival was set up.

After the Millennium Exhibition in 1925, which presented numerous objects from the historical museum, these were largely transferred to the new Rhenish Museum in Deutz, with which it was eventually merged. Modern exhibition techniques such as "instructive models, casts [and] statistics" were added to the inventory. Due to the concept of the new museum being extended to the Rhineland, objects of rural and middle-class domestic culture from the Lower Rhine region to the Westerwald were added. From 1925 onwards, a collection of Judaica was built up, which now (2013) comprises around 350 objects.

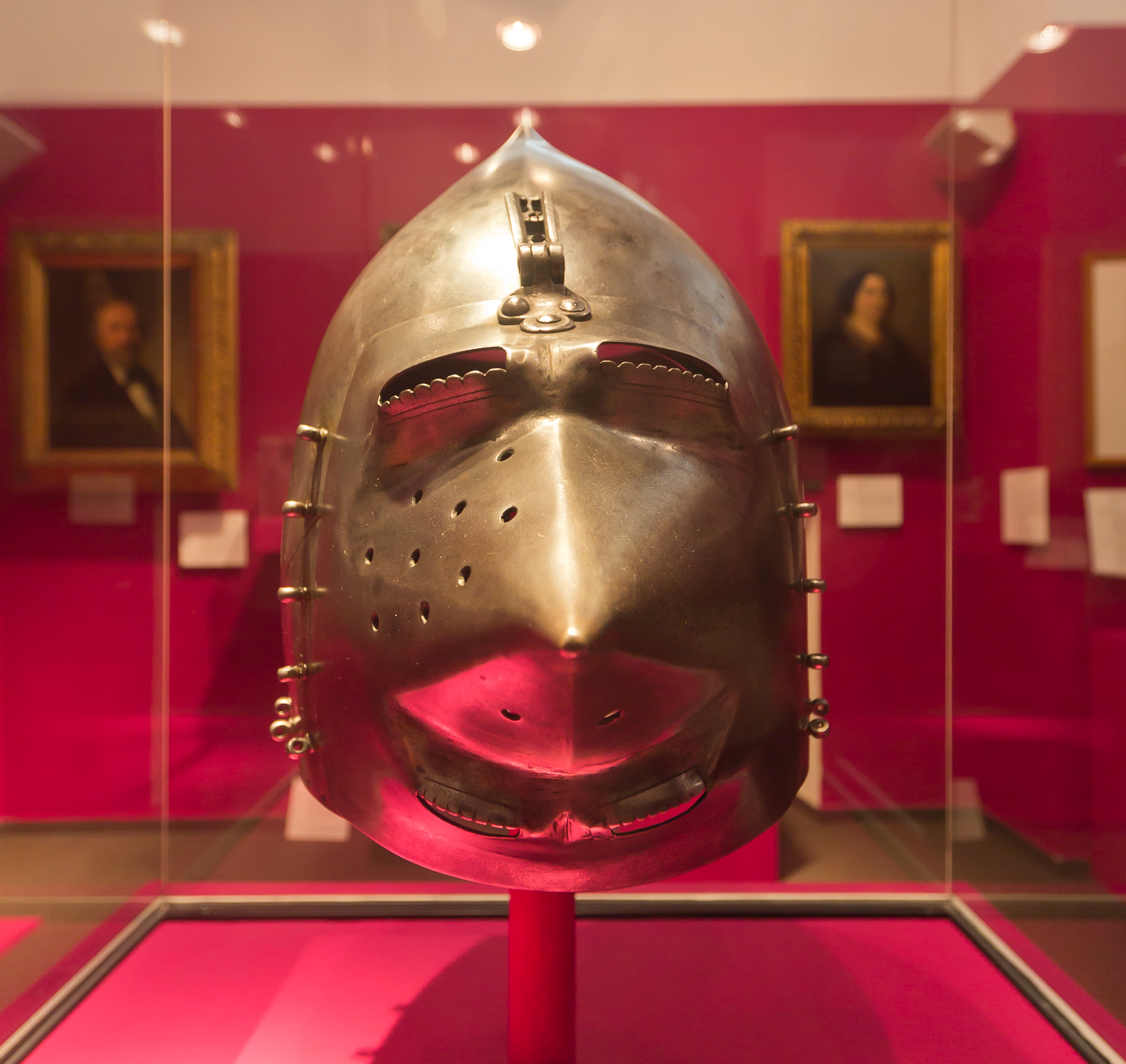
The hounskull

During the Nazi era, the Haus der Rheinischen Heimat was supposed to be a "German folk museum in the best sense" and of "national political importance". It showed Rhenish history from the Carolingians to the 20th century. The museum inventory was joined by a range of Nazi literature, including several copies of Mein Kampf (even after 1945) as well as other objects of different provenance, often in exchange with other institutions.

In the immediate post-war period, a small number of new objects joined the collection by way of donations or exchanges. Immediately after the Währungsreform, a copy of the photobook Gesang im Feuerofen with the Cologne rubble photos by Hermann Claasen was acquired. In 1953, even before the move to the Zeughaus, it was possible - quite controversially discussed and after approval by the cultural and financial planning committee - to acquire the extensive portfolio work Köln wie es war by August Sander at a price of 25,000 DM.

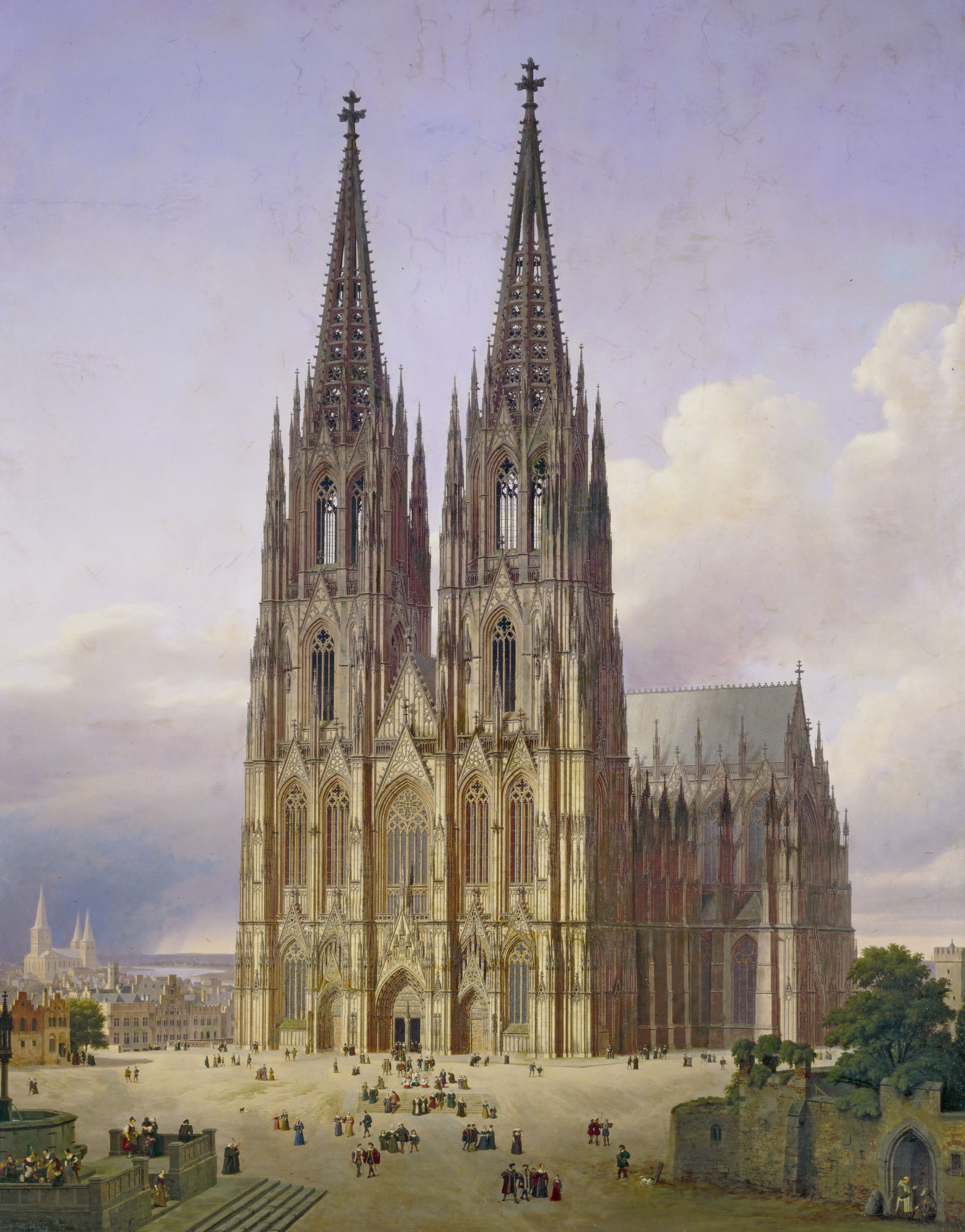
Carl Hasenpflug: Ideal view of Cologne Cathedral

In the following years, the graphic collection was expanded with well over a thousand prints by Roland Anheisser, Theo Blum, Walter Wegener and Carl Determeyer. In addition, there were among others paintings by Barthel Bruyn the Younger, Cornelis Springer and Carl Hasenpflug.

A first object from the Stadtmuseum relating to the impending Shoah entered the collection as a gift in 1965: a small Tefillin capsule that had been found in the destroyed Glockengasse synagogue on 10 November 1938 – one day after the Kristallnacht. The Nazi period was then included as a focus of the collection from the early 1980s onwards.

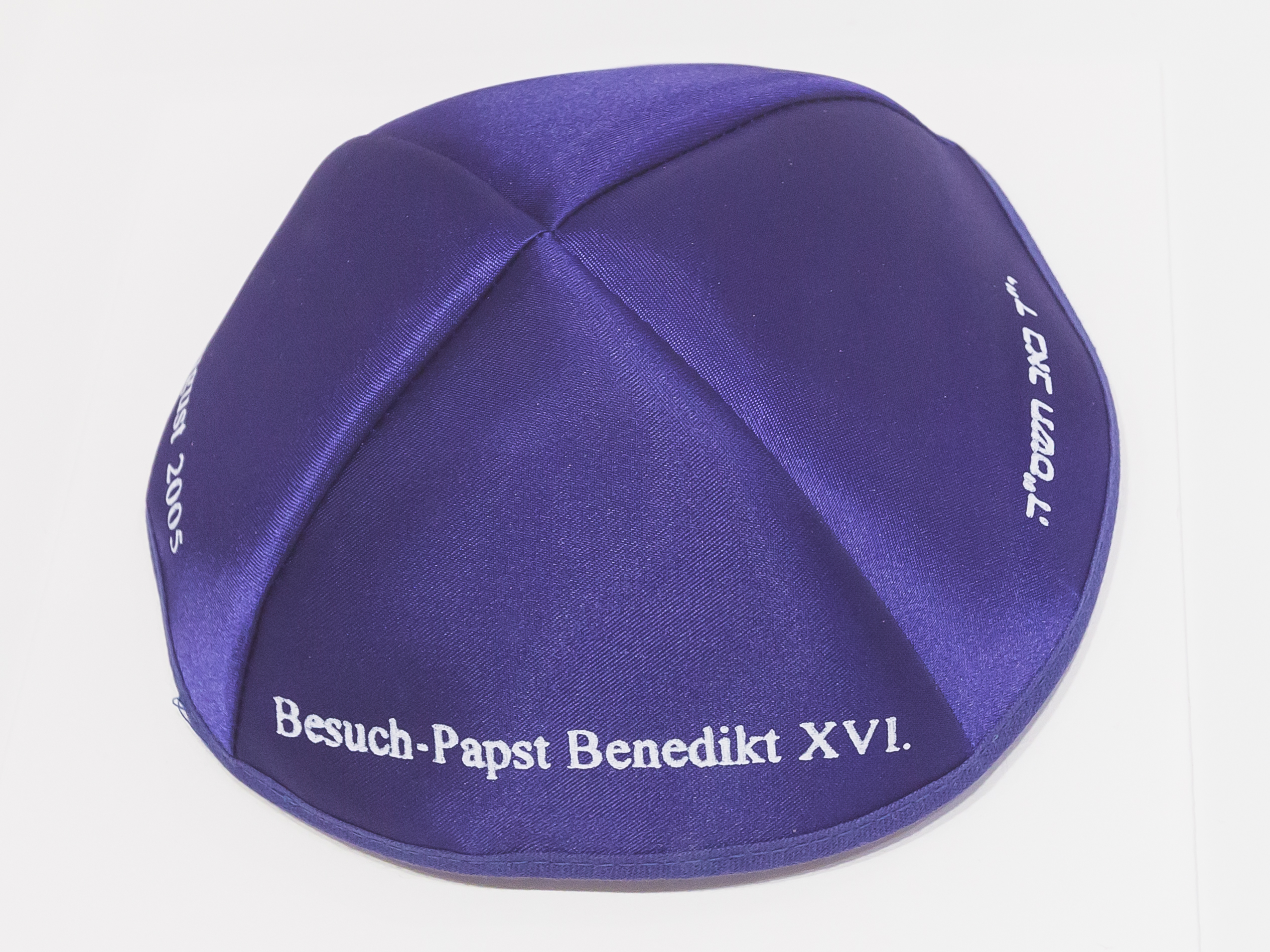
Kippa Visit Pope Benedict XVI. 19 August 2005

Other objects include Cologne's historical Ratssilber, textiles, and since 1985 also increasingly current and contemporary art, such as a painting of Cologne Cathedral by Andy Warhol. In addition, gaps were filled in the area of everyday history and everyday life, the subject of guest workers was approached and thus increasingly the present, from whose everyday culture objects are regularly taken into the collection. Examples of this are a printed kippa from the visit of Pope Benedict XVI to the Synagogen-Gemeinde Köln in 2005, a German flag from the 2006 FIFA World Cup or costumes from the Cologne studios of the TV Series Lindenstraße. Equally, however, there is also evidence of more serious events from Cologne's recent past: a flag from the election campaign stand where the assassination attempt on Henriette Reker was carried out, the notebook of a refugee from Syria with plans for the reconstruction of his house, and finally a surgical mask worn in the Cologne city council during the COVID-19 pandemic.

== Exhibition ==
=== Permanent exhibition ===
The presentation of the exhibits was not chronological, but thematically structured. For reasons of space, essential parts of Cologne's city history remained insufficiently or completely uncovered. The house has an average of about 70,000 visitors a year.

Occasionally, loans from other museums are shown, as during the Tutankhamun exhibition between 21 June and 19 October 1980 with a record attendance of 1.3 million. Exhibitions that were particularly successful with the public also took place outside the house, such as Der Name der Freiheit in 1988 in the Kunsthalle, Die Kölner Kartause um 1500 in 1991 in the former Cologne Charterhouse and Der Riss im Himmel – Clemens August und seine Epoche 2000 im Augustusburg and Falkenlust Palaces, Brühl.

The Alte Wache, which is connected to the museum by a connecting building, continues to be used for special exhibitions.

=== Special exhibitions ===
- 7 November 2020 – 27 June 2021 extended: Köln 1945. Alltag in Trümmern
- 5 May – 27 September 2020: 50 Johr Bläck Fööss: Die Jubiläumsausstellung im Kölnischen Stadtmuseum
Impressions from the exhibition '50 Johr Bläck Fööss'

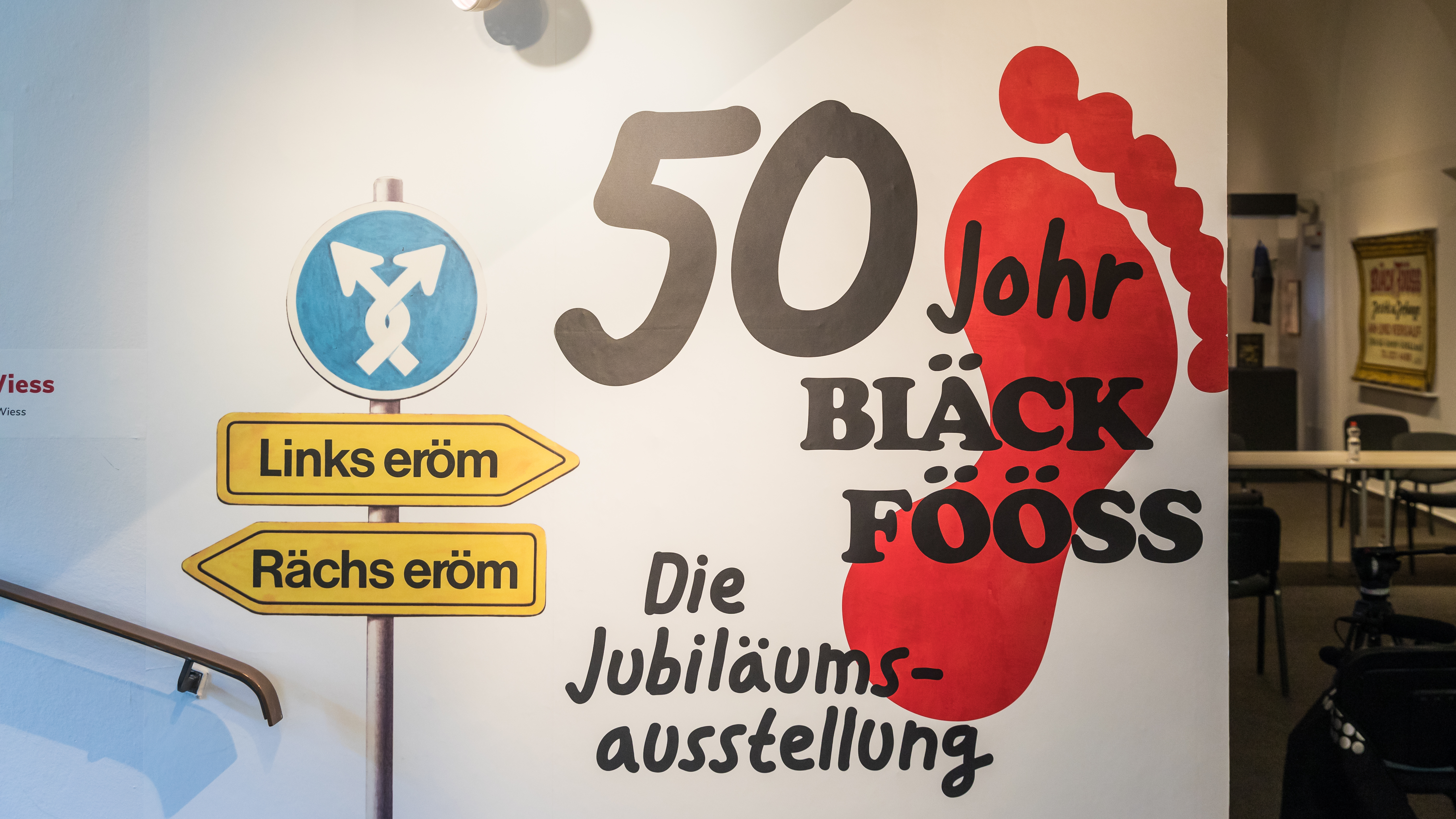

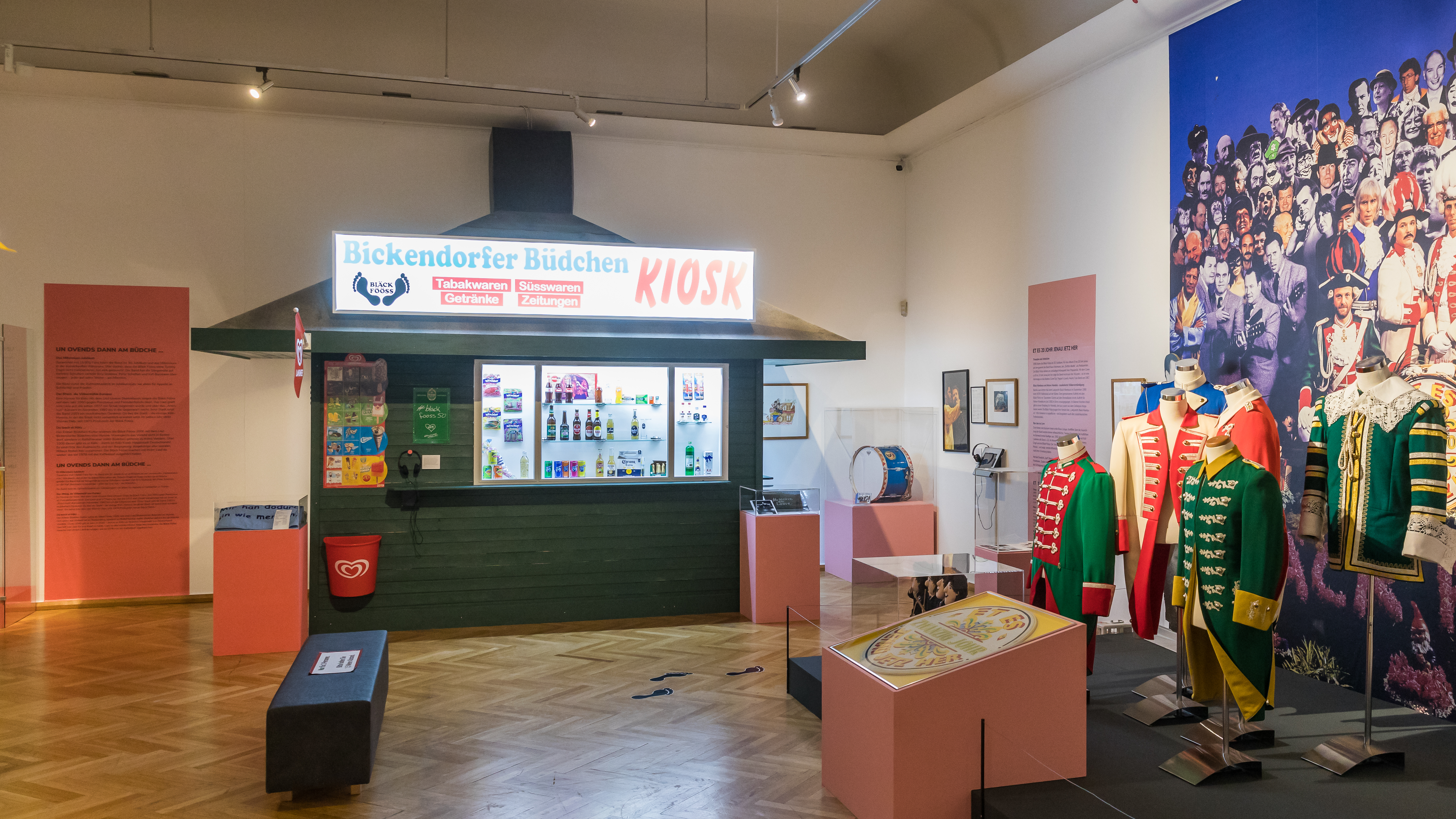

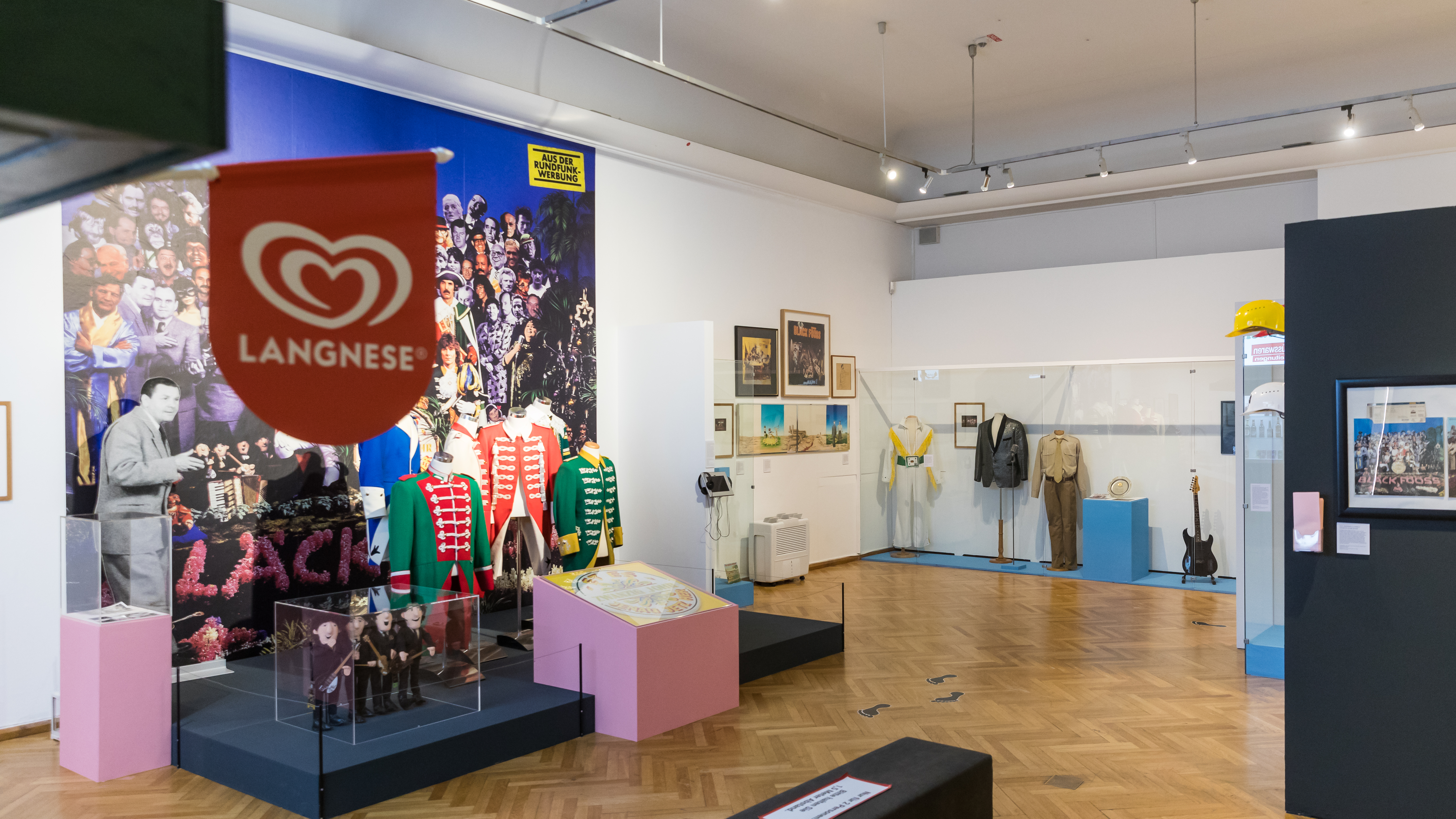

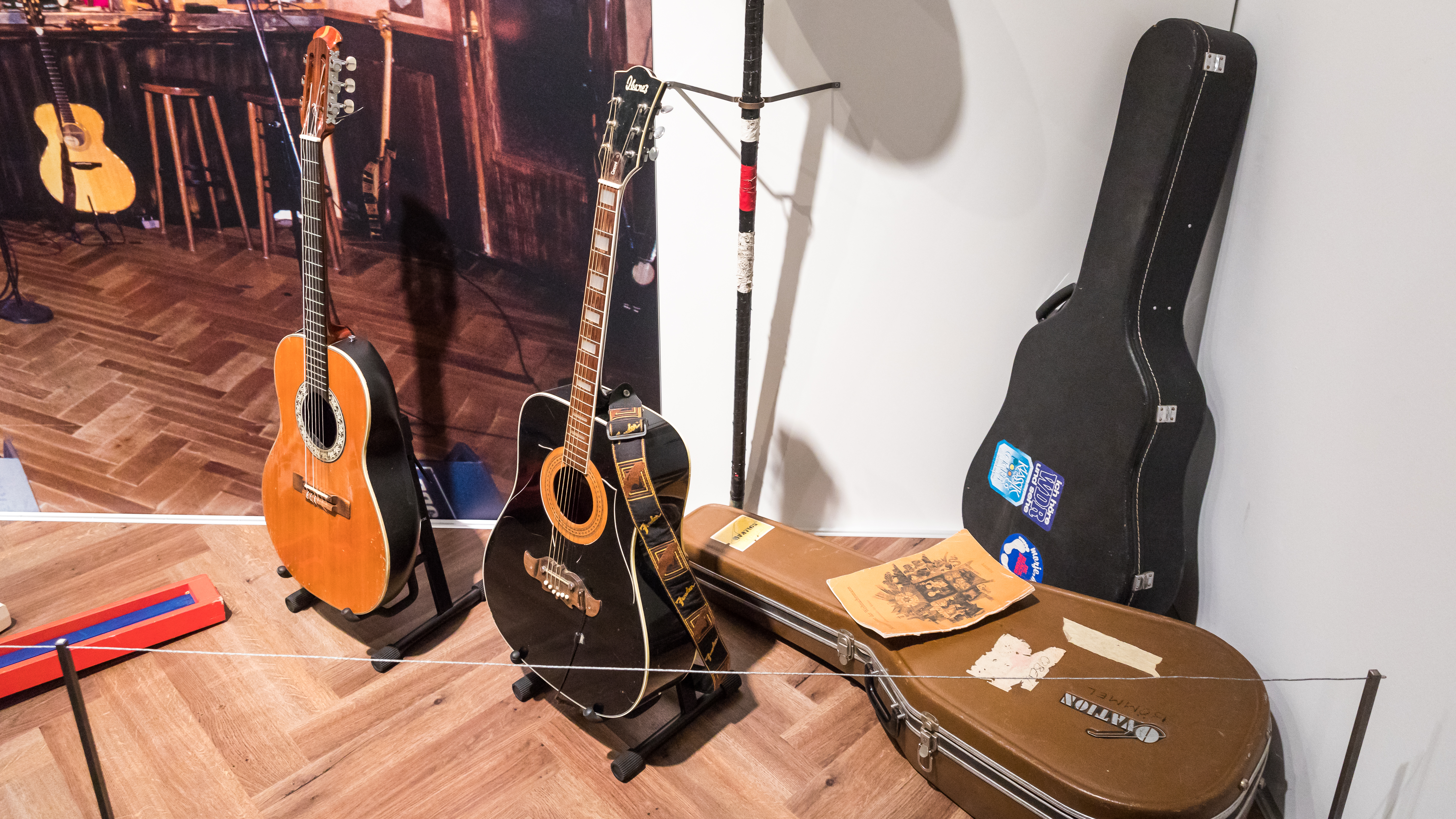
Past special exhibitions
- 2010: Von Marlar und der Schönen Marie. 150 Jahre Cologne Zoological Garden (29 May – 29 August)
- 2010: Köln 13 Uhr 58. Geborgene Schätze aus dem Historical Archive of the City of Cologne (3 October – 21 November)
- 2010/2011: Der kolossale Geselle. Ansichten des Kölner Doms bis 1842 (10 December 2010 – 5 March 2011)
- 2011: Made in Cologne – Kölner Marken für die Welt. 11 June – 11 September 2011, Internationally renowned Cologne brands and their history.
- 2011/12: Der Waidmarkt, drunter und drüber (8 October 2011 – 18 February 2012)

Zur Sache Schätzchen! Raritäten aus dem Depot

From 17 March to 10 June 2012, the Kölnisches Stadtmuseum showed objects from its depot for the first time, which covers 3,900 m^{2}. For the exhibition, the specific atmosphere of a museum depot was partly created, among other things with the help of steel shelves and a safe made of wood and cardboard.

On display were over 150 exhibits of the History of Cologne from the 16th century to the present day. Objects that Casanova, Johann von Werth and Wolfgang Niedecken owned; figurines and stage clothes, a Klingelpütz cell door and a swastika flag that presumably hung in Cologne Cathedral. In addition, stories of objects were told: that of a carpentered soapbox, that of the ten-year-old boy who found a rusty pistol from the First World War in his parents' garden. Or that of the Cologne astronaut Reinhold Ewald of his space glove during the 1997 MIR mission.

The exhibition was curated by deputy director Michael Euler-Schmidt. The Cologne photographer Boris Becker accompanied the exhibition with a specially created edition.

In future, a special exhibition with objects from the depot will be shown once a year; they are to be understood as accompanying and preparatory measures towards a new staging of the Kölnisches Stadtmuseum.

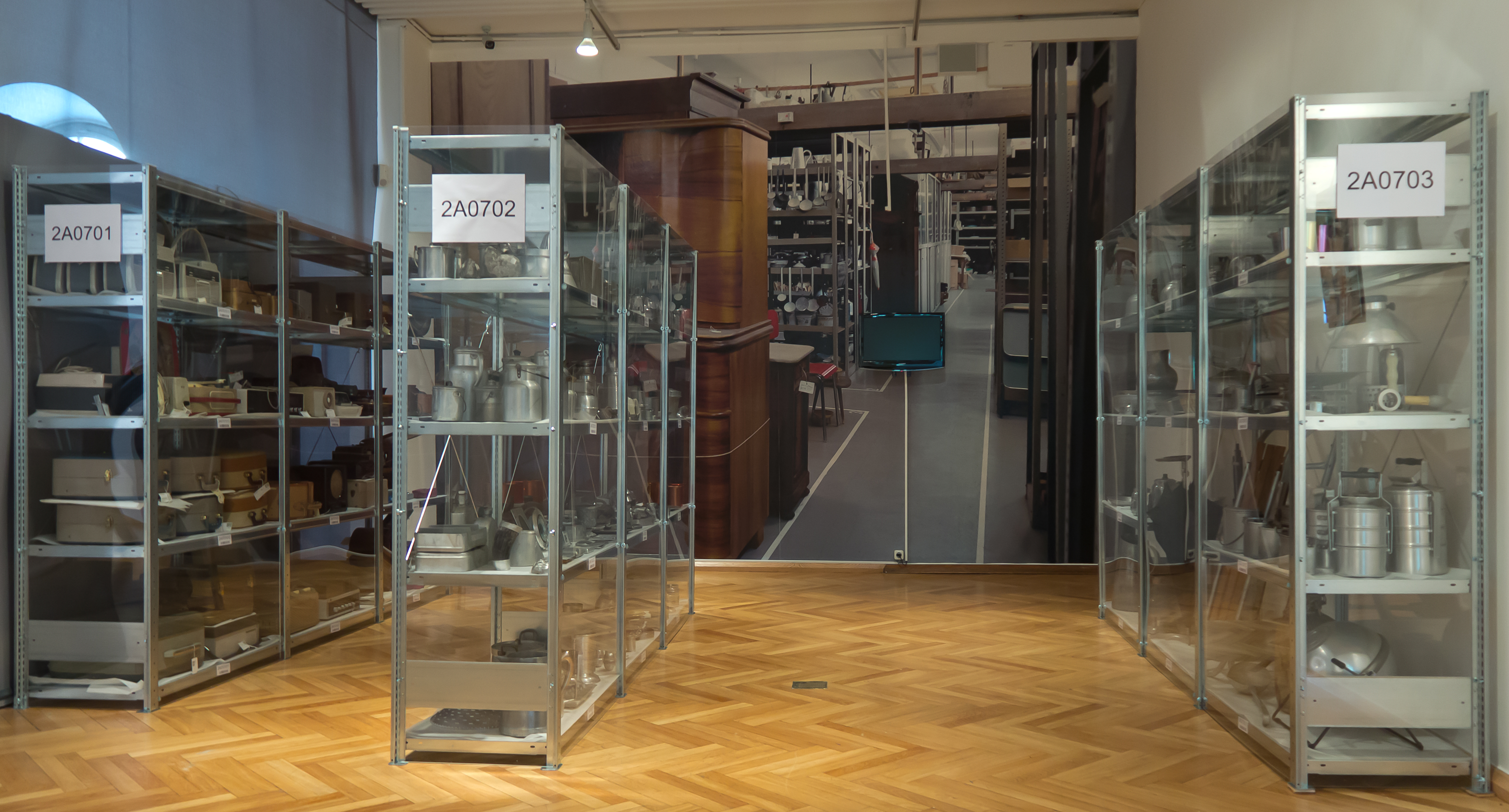
Depot shelves

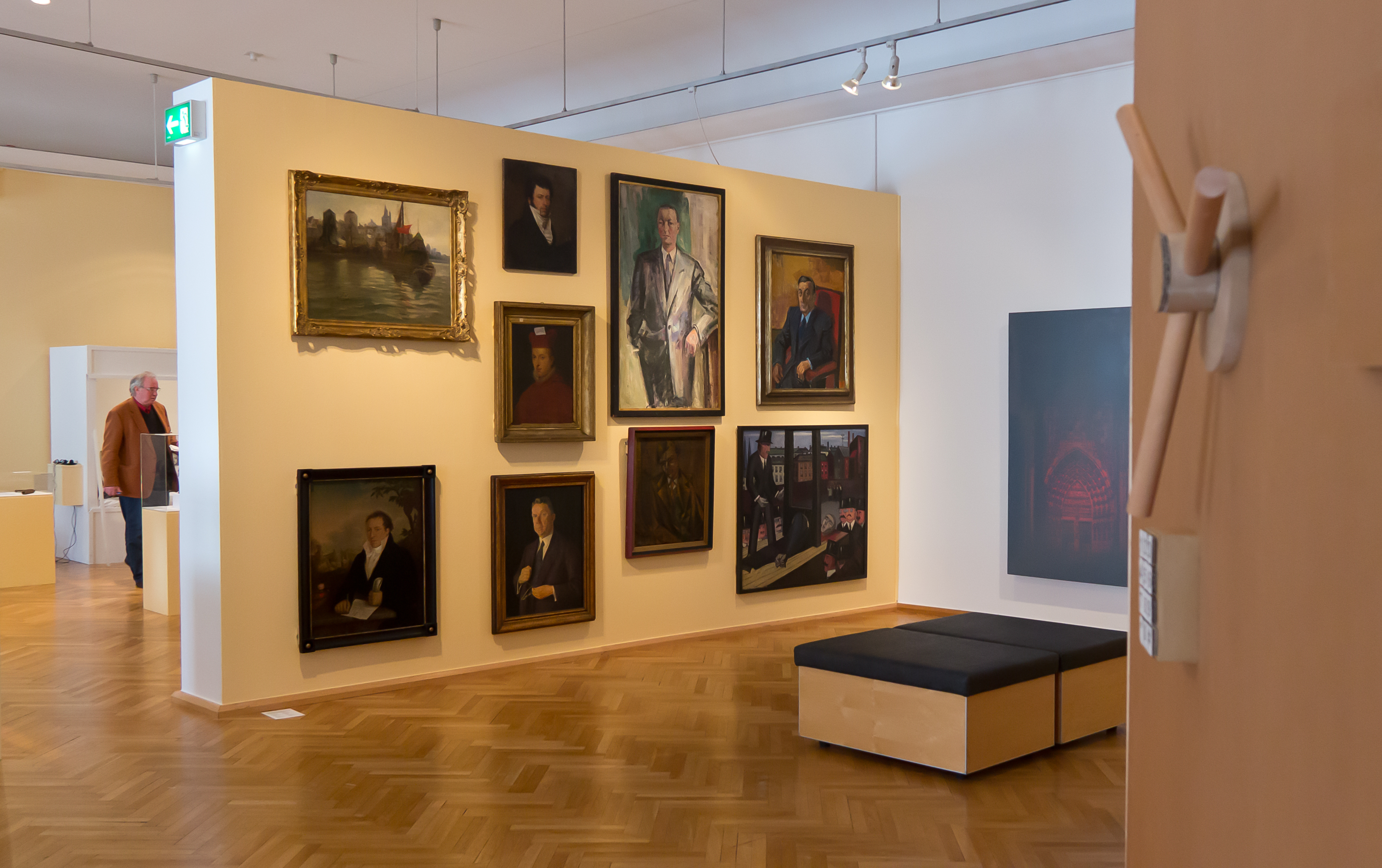
Paintings in Petersburger Hängung

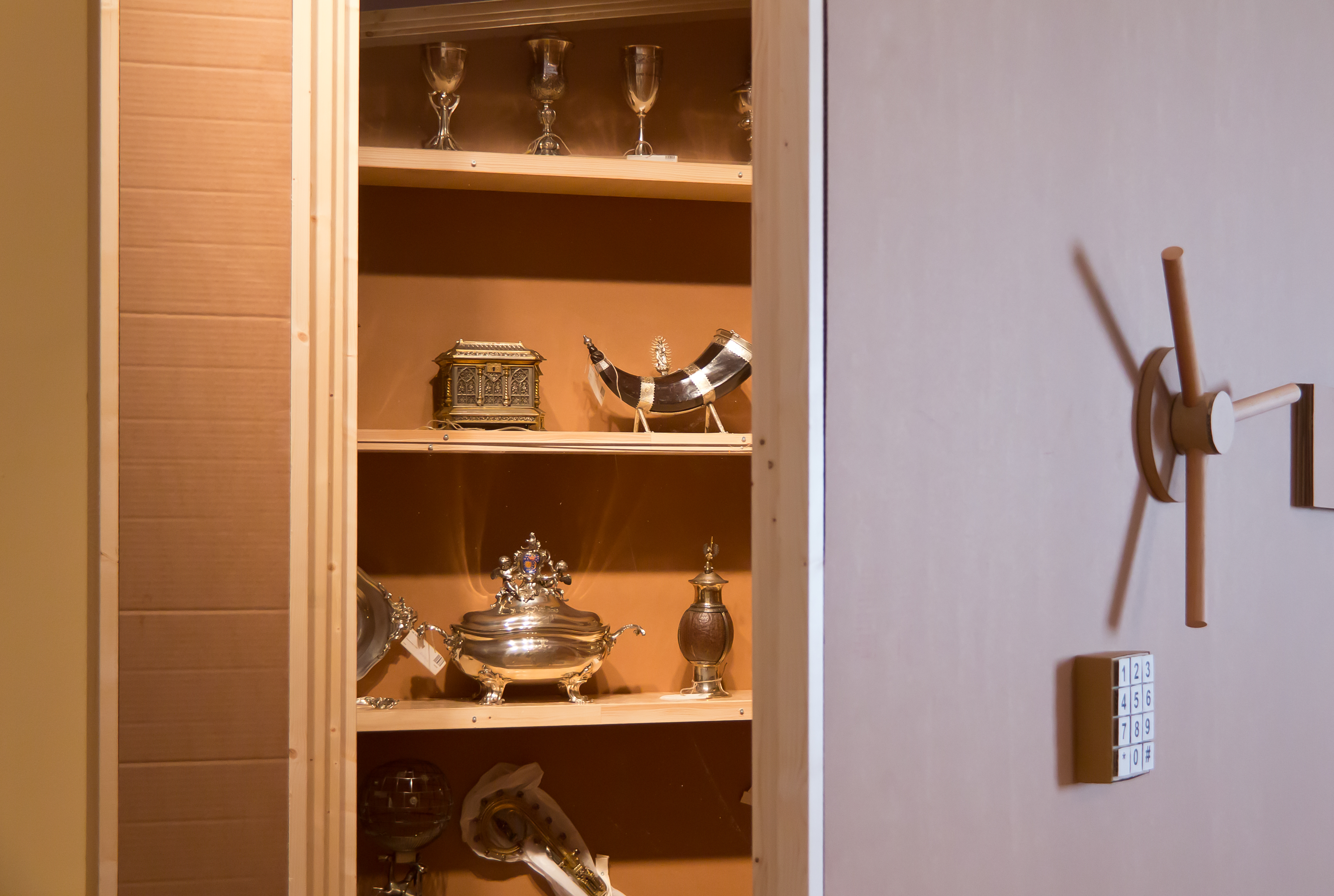
Deposit treasures in the replica safe

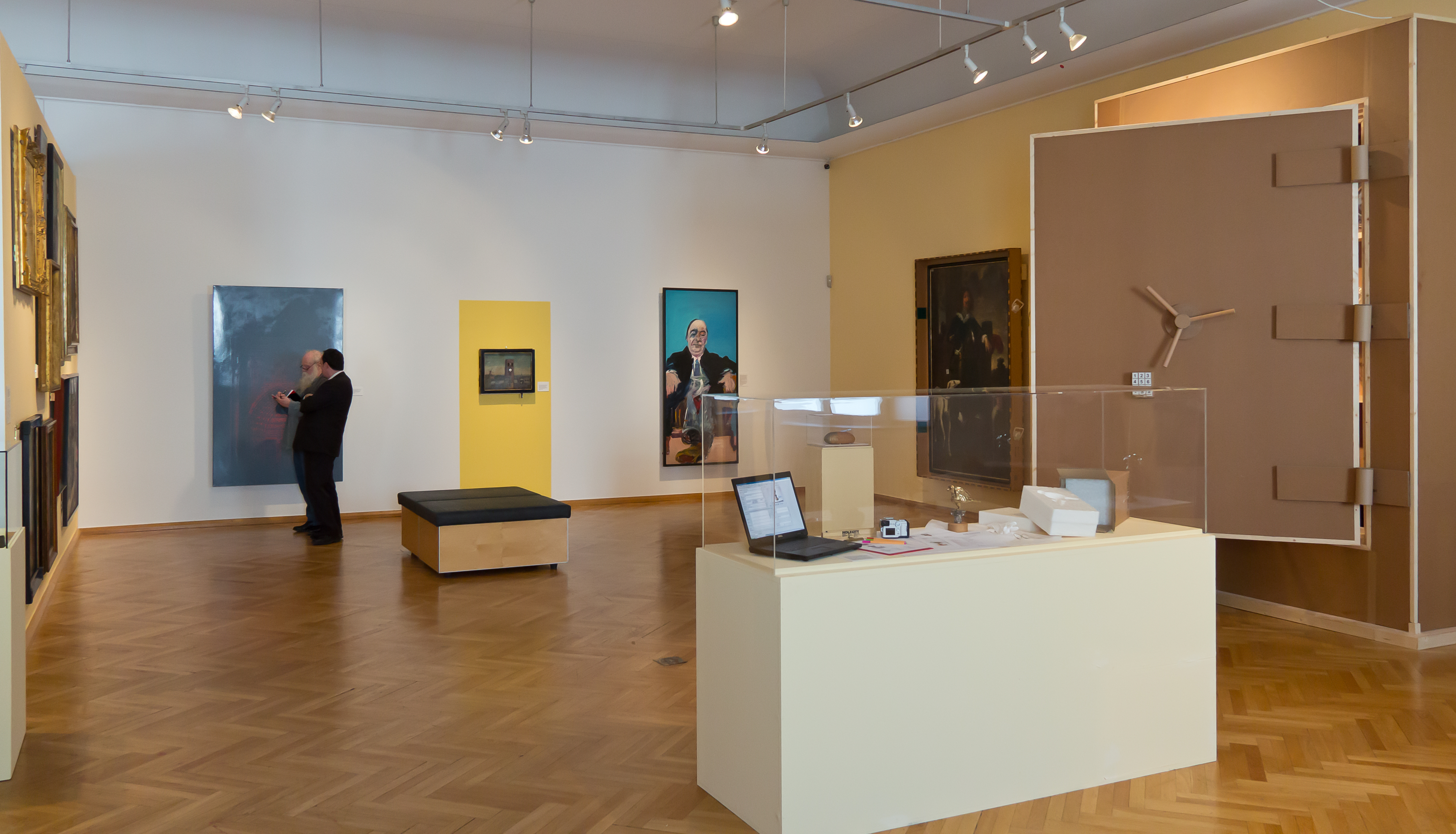
Display case in the foreground
- 1 June – 26 August 2012: In den Trümmern von Köln, Raffael Becker. The 26 works shown there were donated to the Stadtmuseum by Raffael Becker.
- 23 June – 16 September 2012: REVOLUTION! Dem Maler Wilhelm Kleinenbroich zum 200. Geburtstag In a retrospective, the entire spectrum of Kleinenbroich's artistic work is shown for the first time. Carnival decorations from 1835, portraits from museum and private collections, socially critical pictures and the Rose Monday procession of 1872.
- 7 July – 16 September 2012: Ein bunter Traum. Kölns romanische Kirchen im Historismus. On display are the magnificent furnishings of the Romanesque churches, most of which were destroyed during the Second World War and rebuilt in the 1950/60s with bare walls and "cleaned" of the ornamentation of post-medieval eras, as the art of the 19th century was considered outdated at the time, and in some cases even contemptible.
Impressions from the exhibition Ein bunter Traum

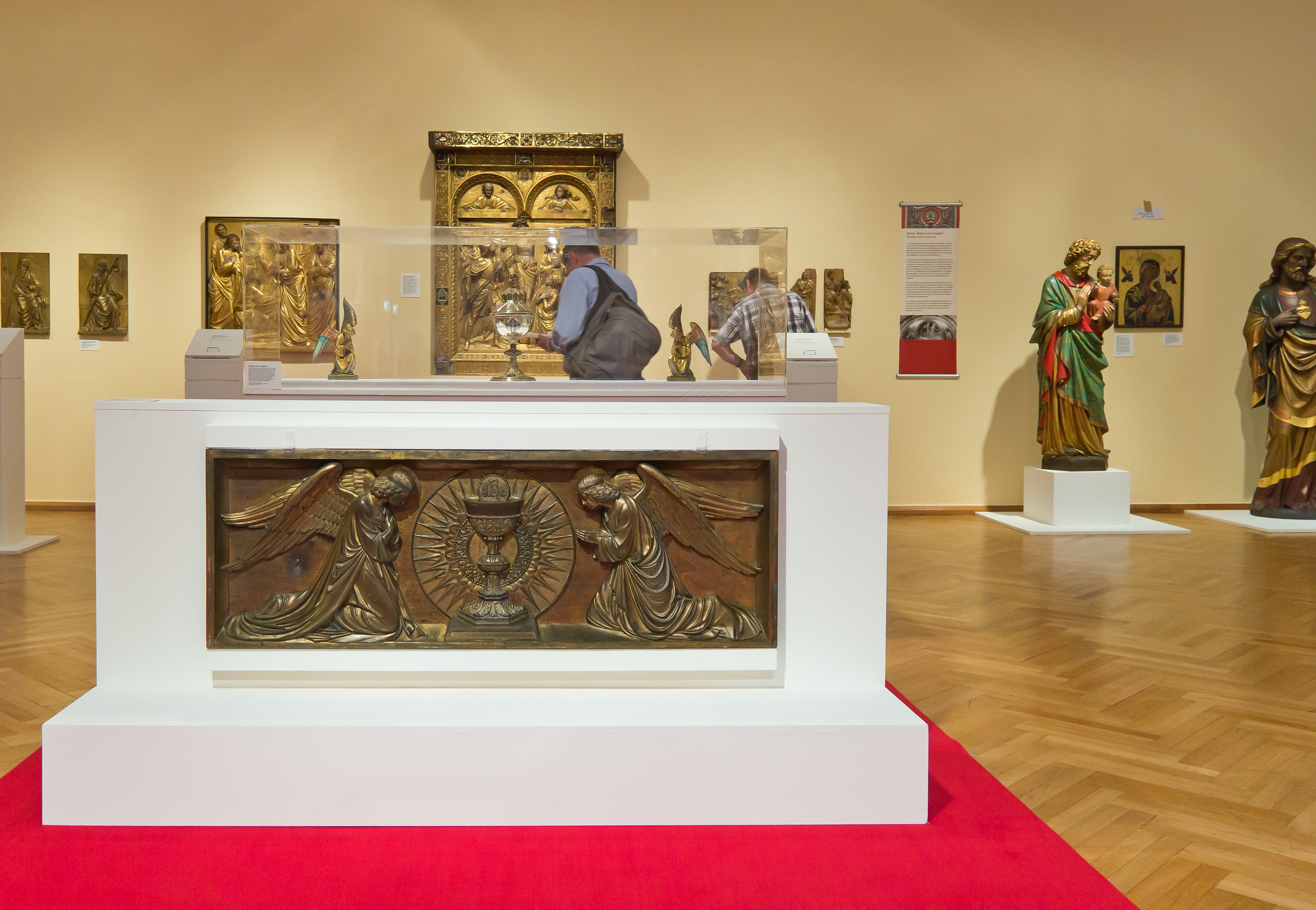

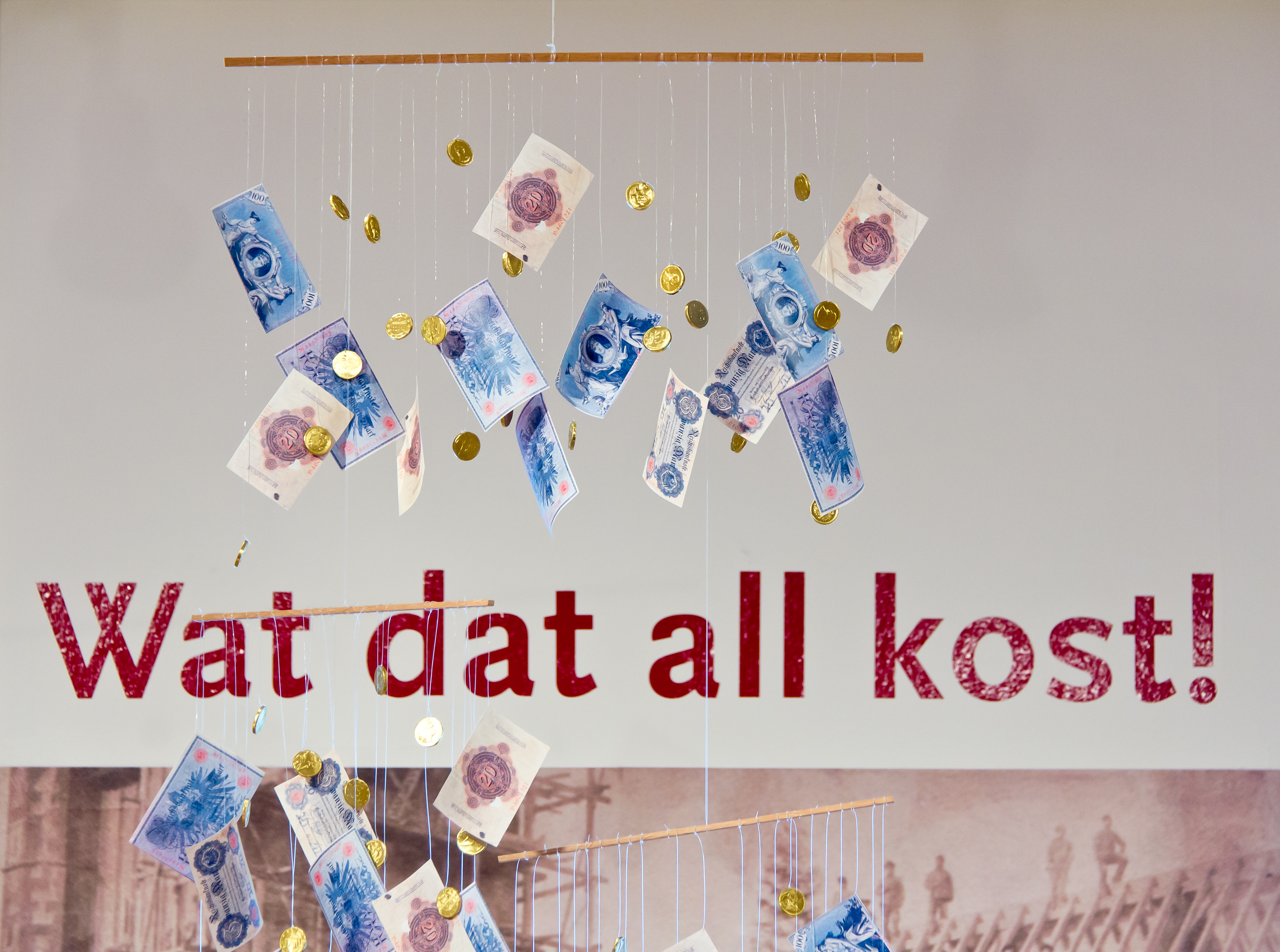

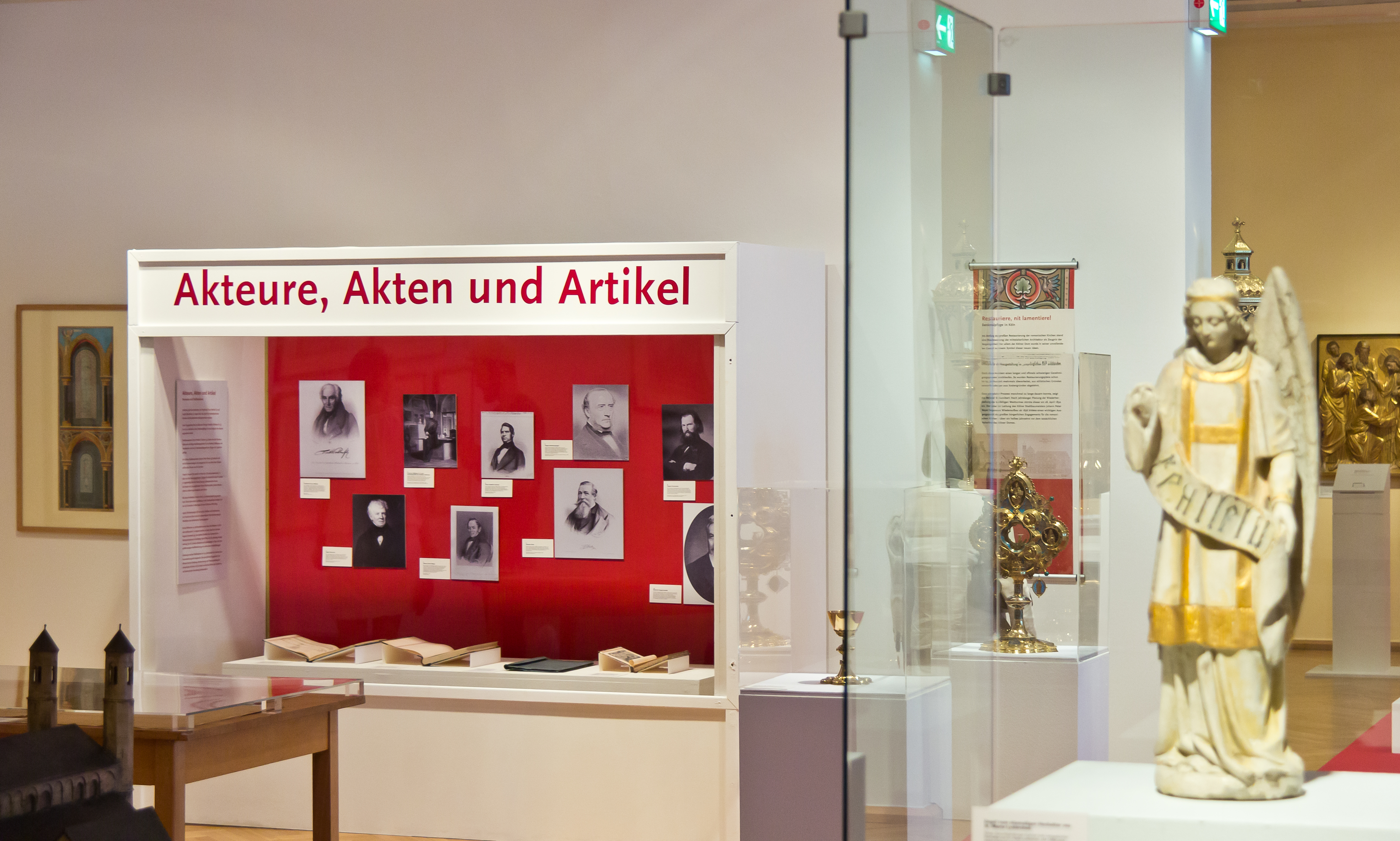

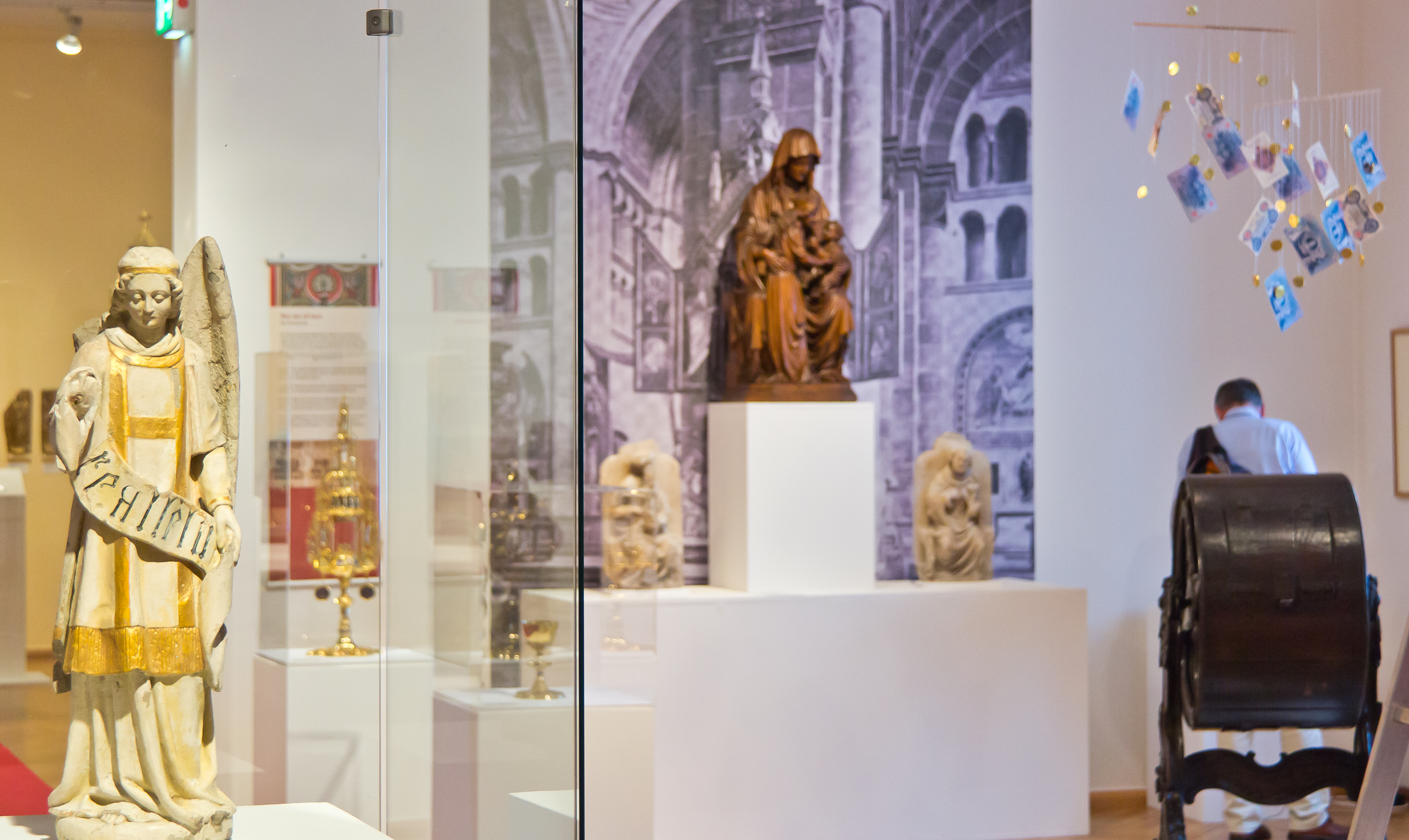

Ralf König – Das Ursula-Projekt

- 13 October 2012 – 9 February 2013: Elftausend Jungfrauen. Ralf König: Das Ursula-Projekt.
Impressions from the exhibition 'Das Ursula-Projekt'

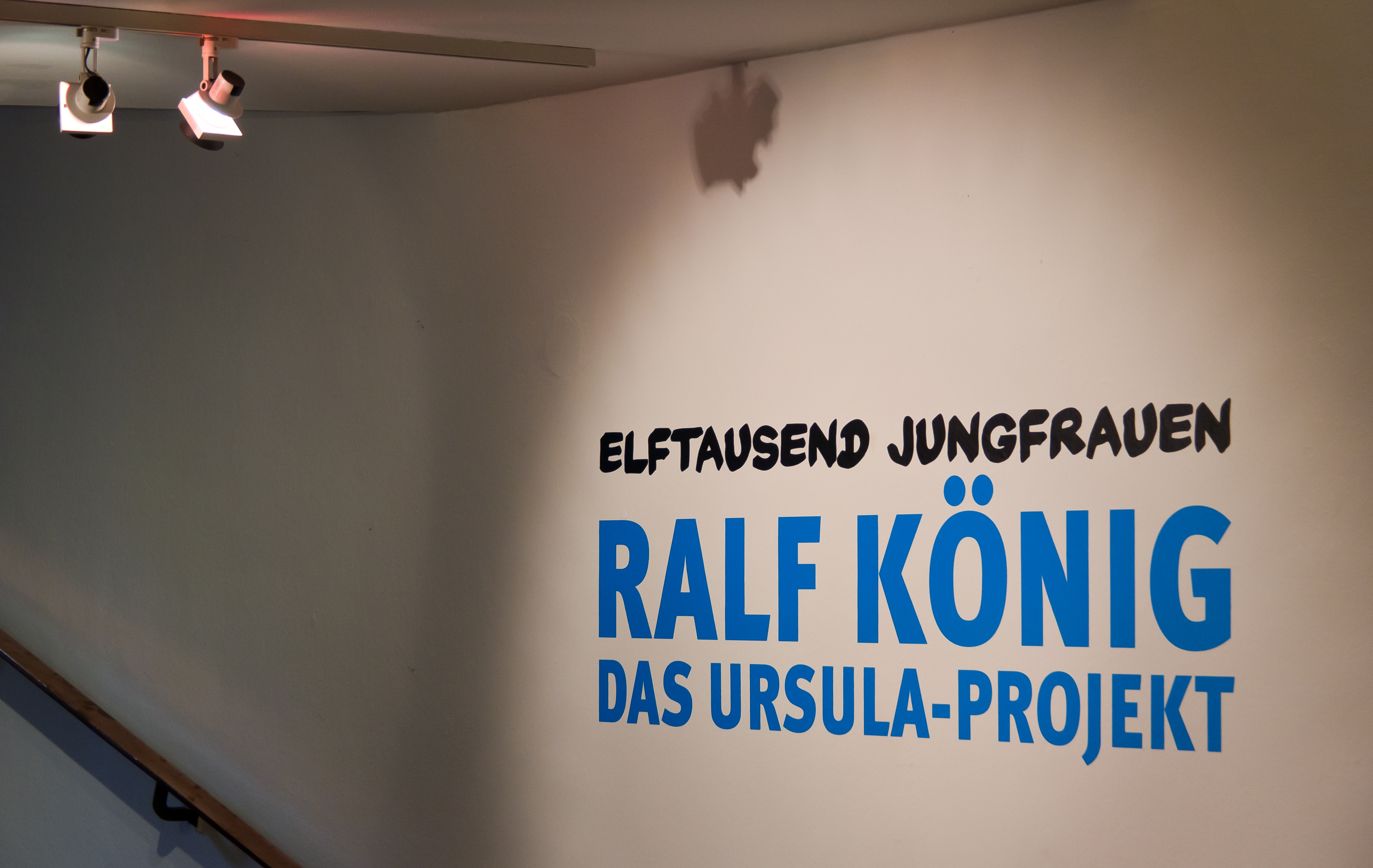

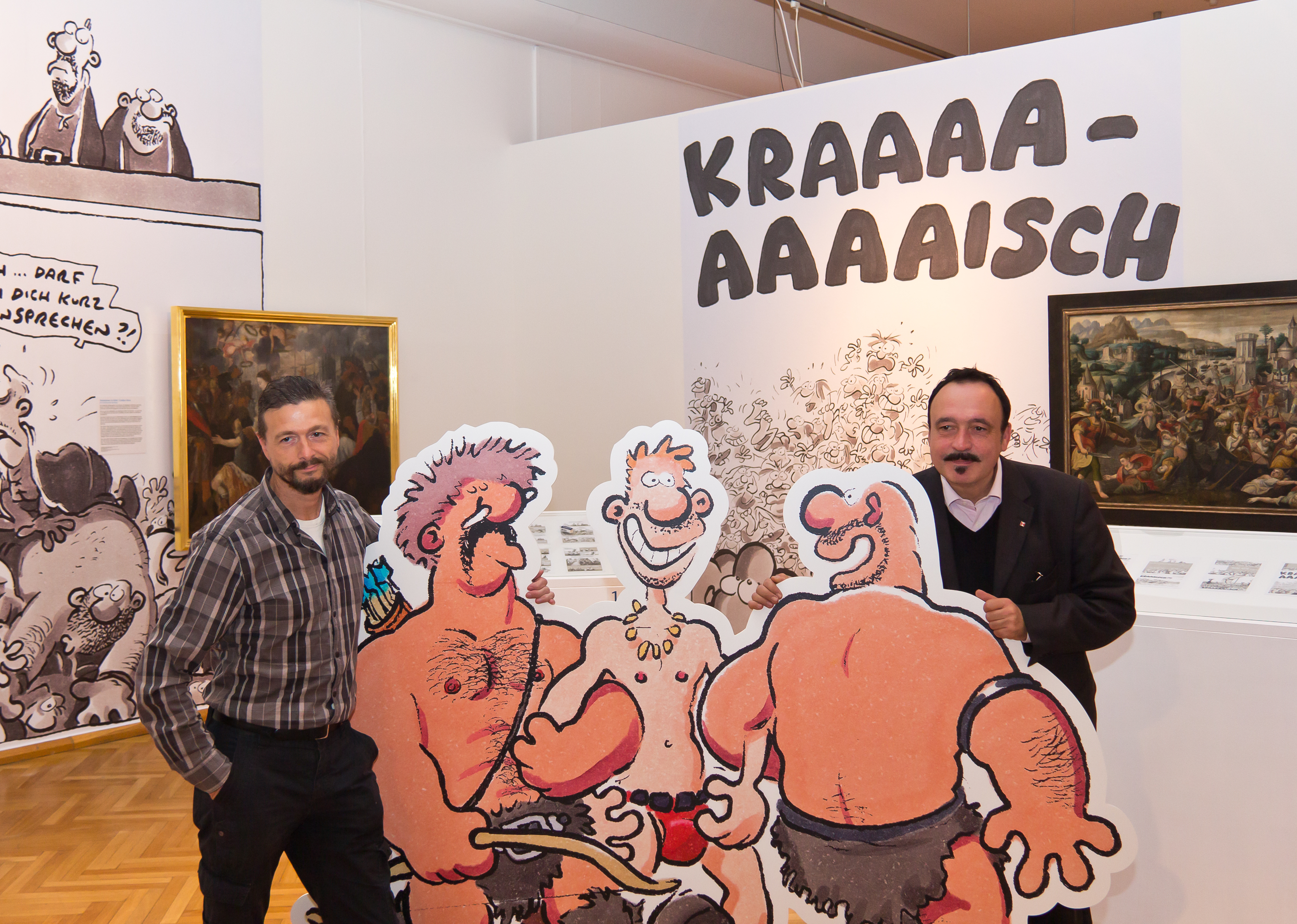
Ralf König and Mario Kramp

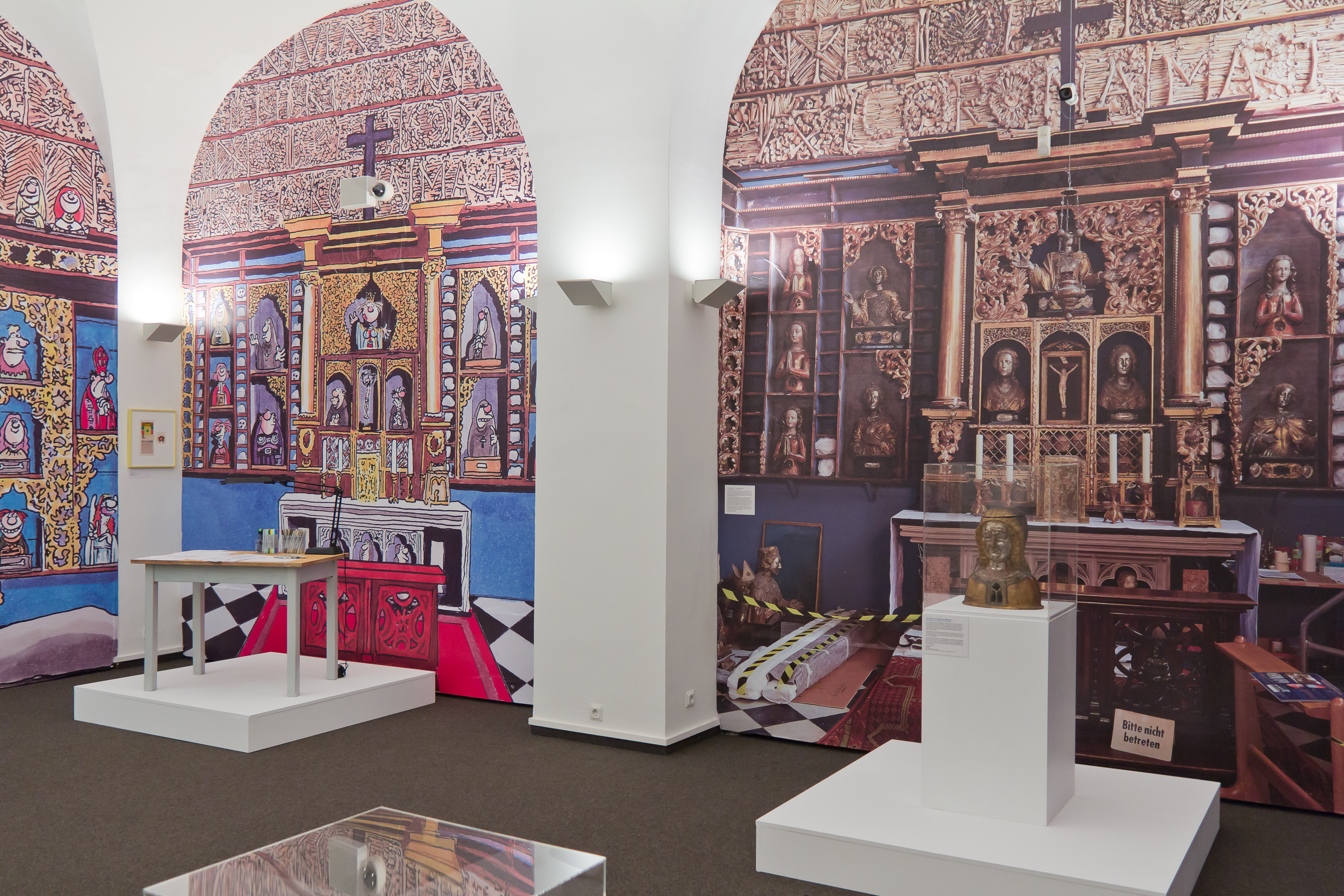
König's desk (left) and the Golden Chamber of the Basilica of St. Ursula, Cologne

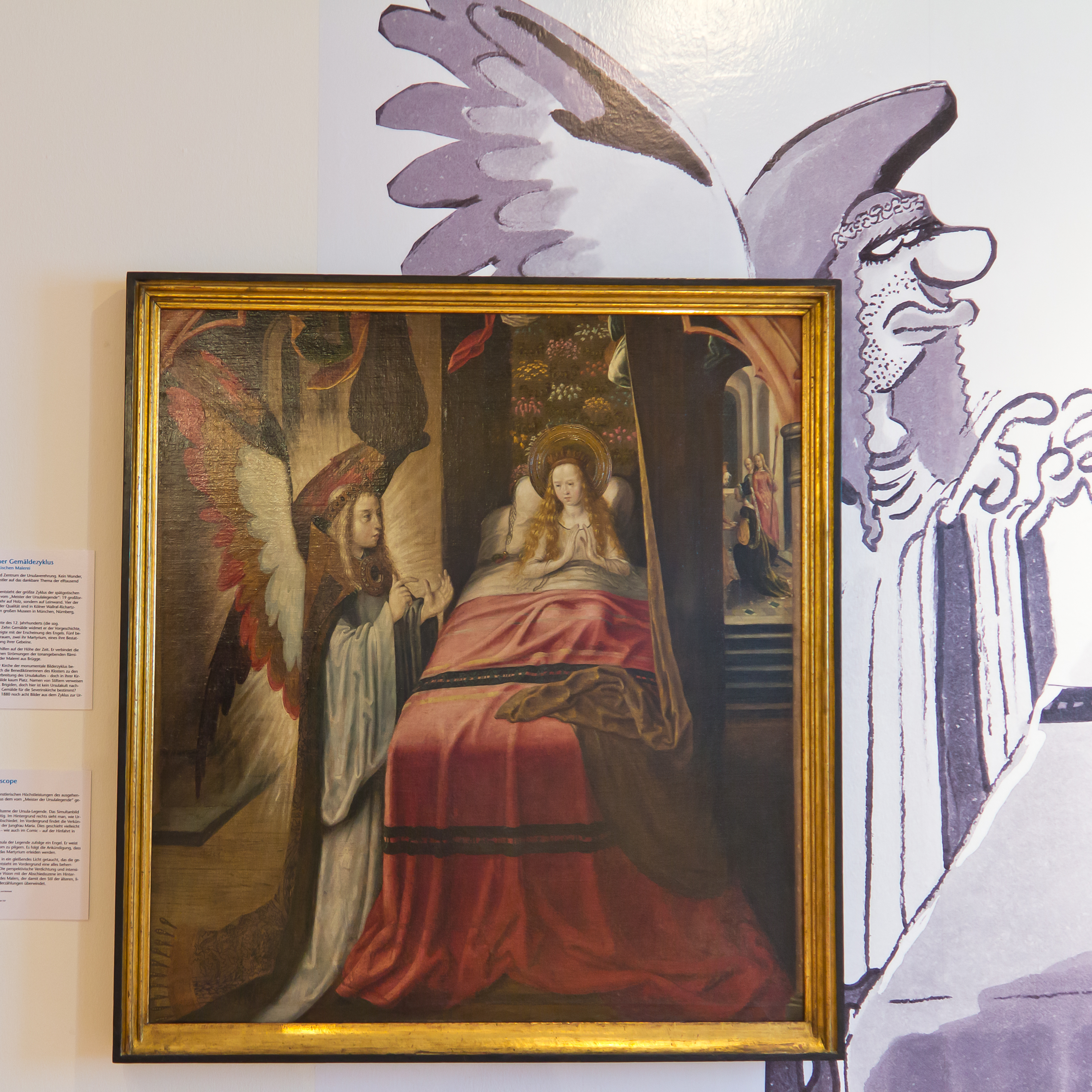
Die Erscheinung des Engels
- 24 November 2012 – 17 March 2013: Köln auf hoher See. Vom Kreuzer „Cöln" bis zur Fregatte „Köln".
- 9 March – 26 May 2013: KÖLN / NIL. Die abenteuerliche Orient-Expedition des Kölners Franz Christian Gau 1818–1820.
- 9 March – 26 May 2013: BORDERLINES. Jasmina Metwaly: video installation 2013.
- 23 March – 10 June 2013: ... irdisches Brot und himmlische Speise ... (Cabinet exhibition on the Eucharistic Congress Cologne).
- 23 June – 10 November 2013: 125 x gekauft – geschenkt – gestiftet.

On the occasion of the museum's 125th birthday, 125 exhibits from 125 years were shown in a special exhibition curated by all staff members. All materials and epochs are taken into account, and the circumstances of their acquisition are also addressed. The exhibition is at the same time a walk through the different locations of the museum: from the Hahnentorburg in 1888 to the Zeughaus in 2013.

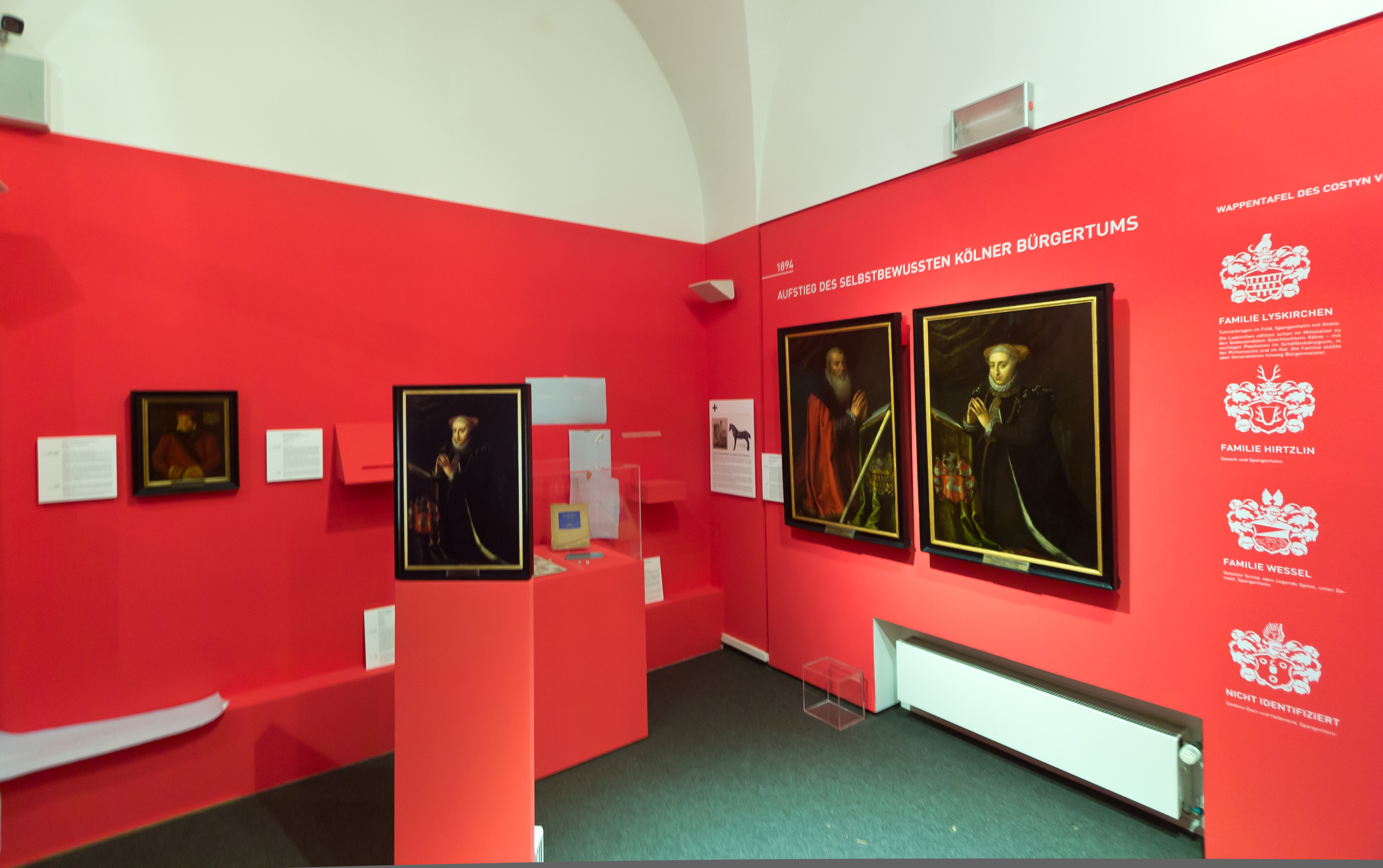
1895: Rise of the self-confident Cologne bourgeoisie

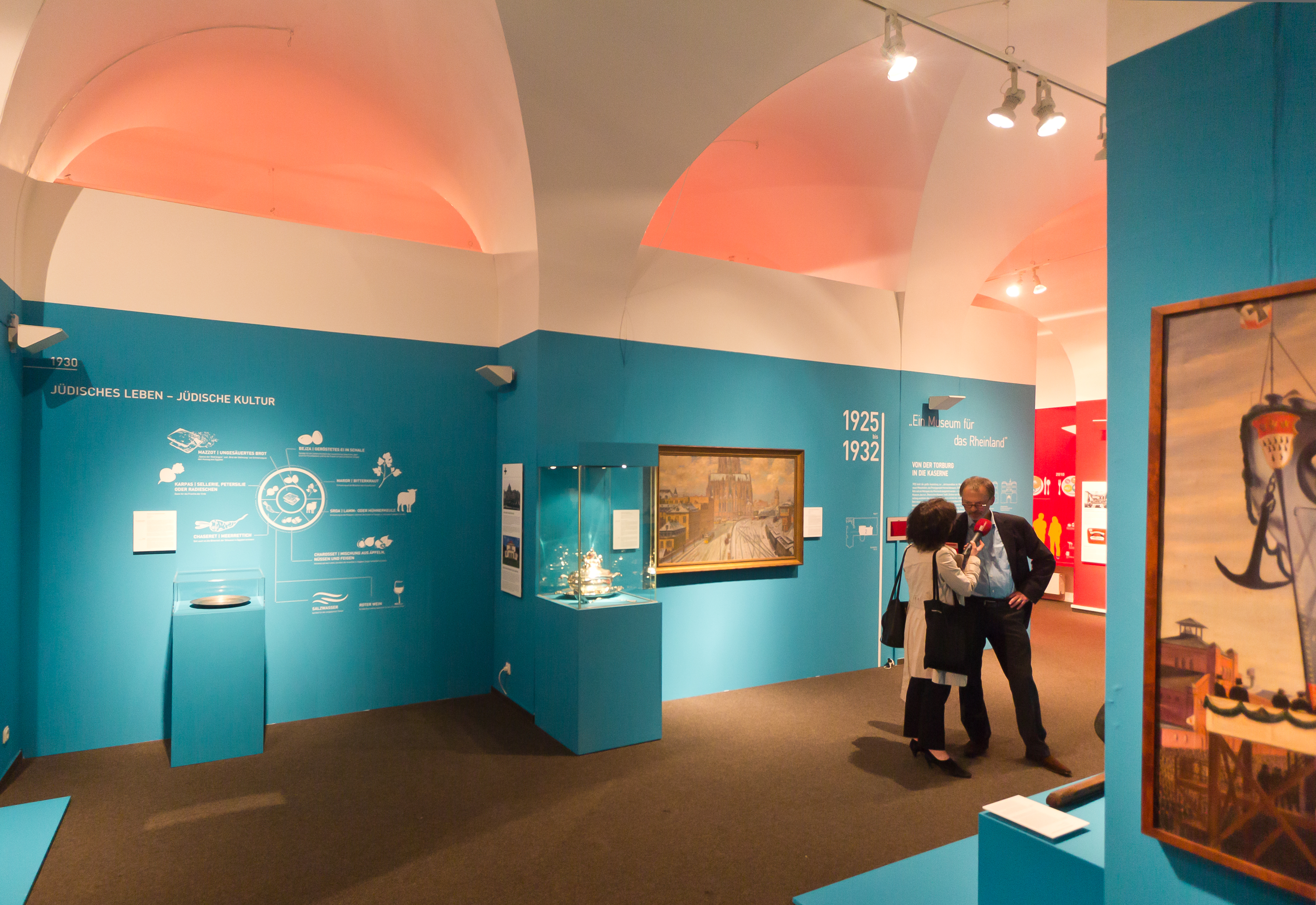
1930: Jewish Life - Jewish Culture

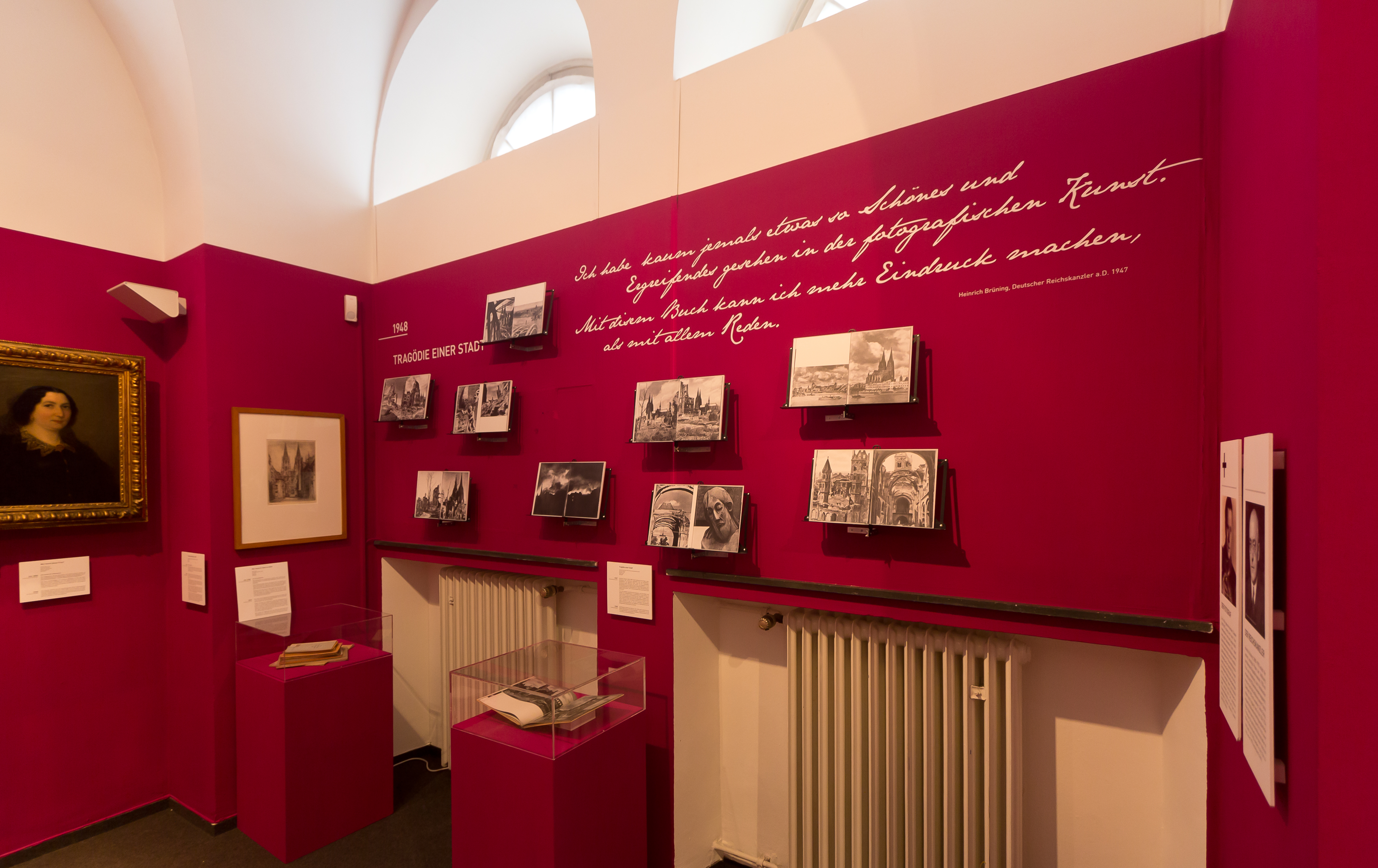
1948: Tragedy of a City

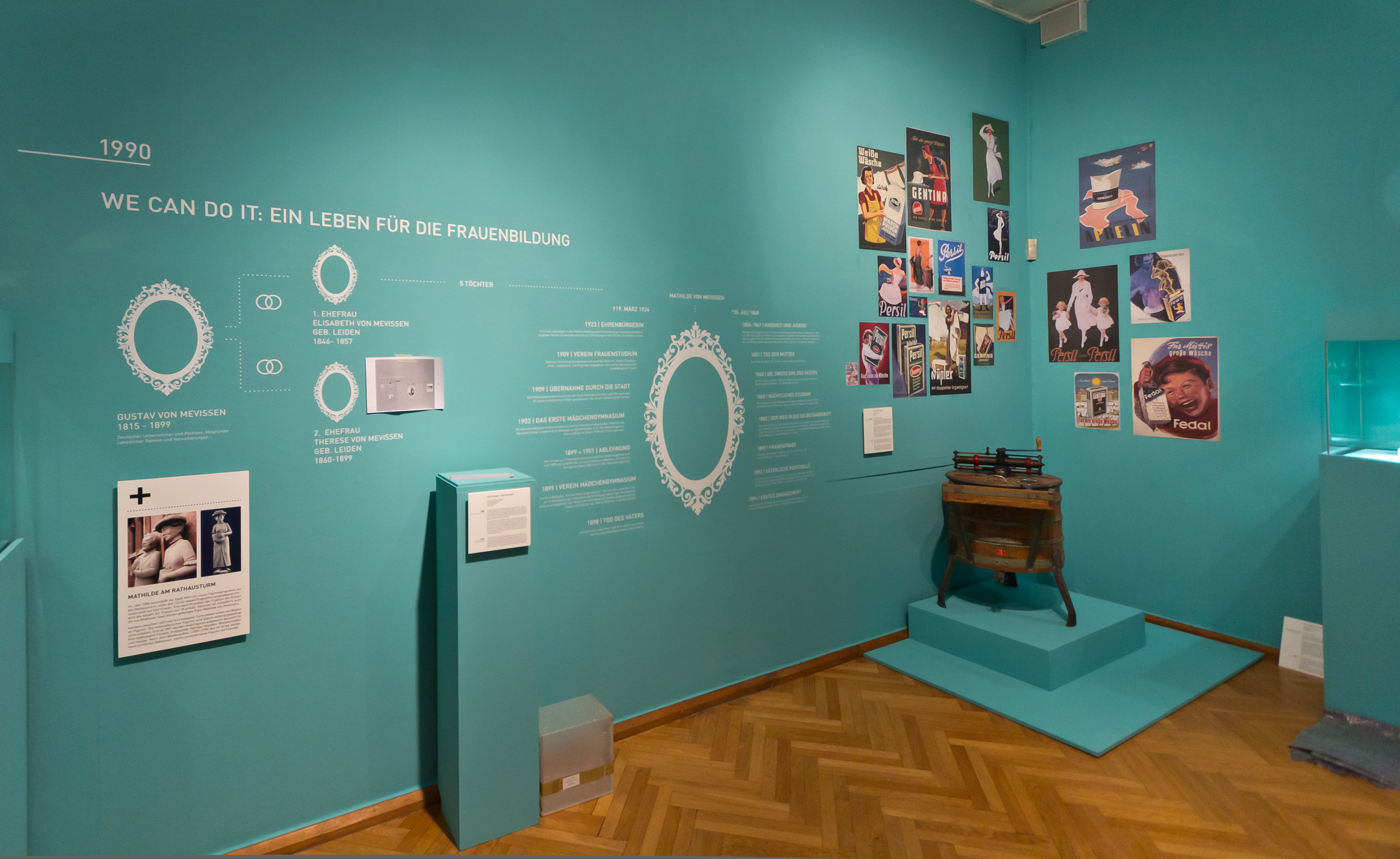
1990: We can do it: A life for women's education

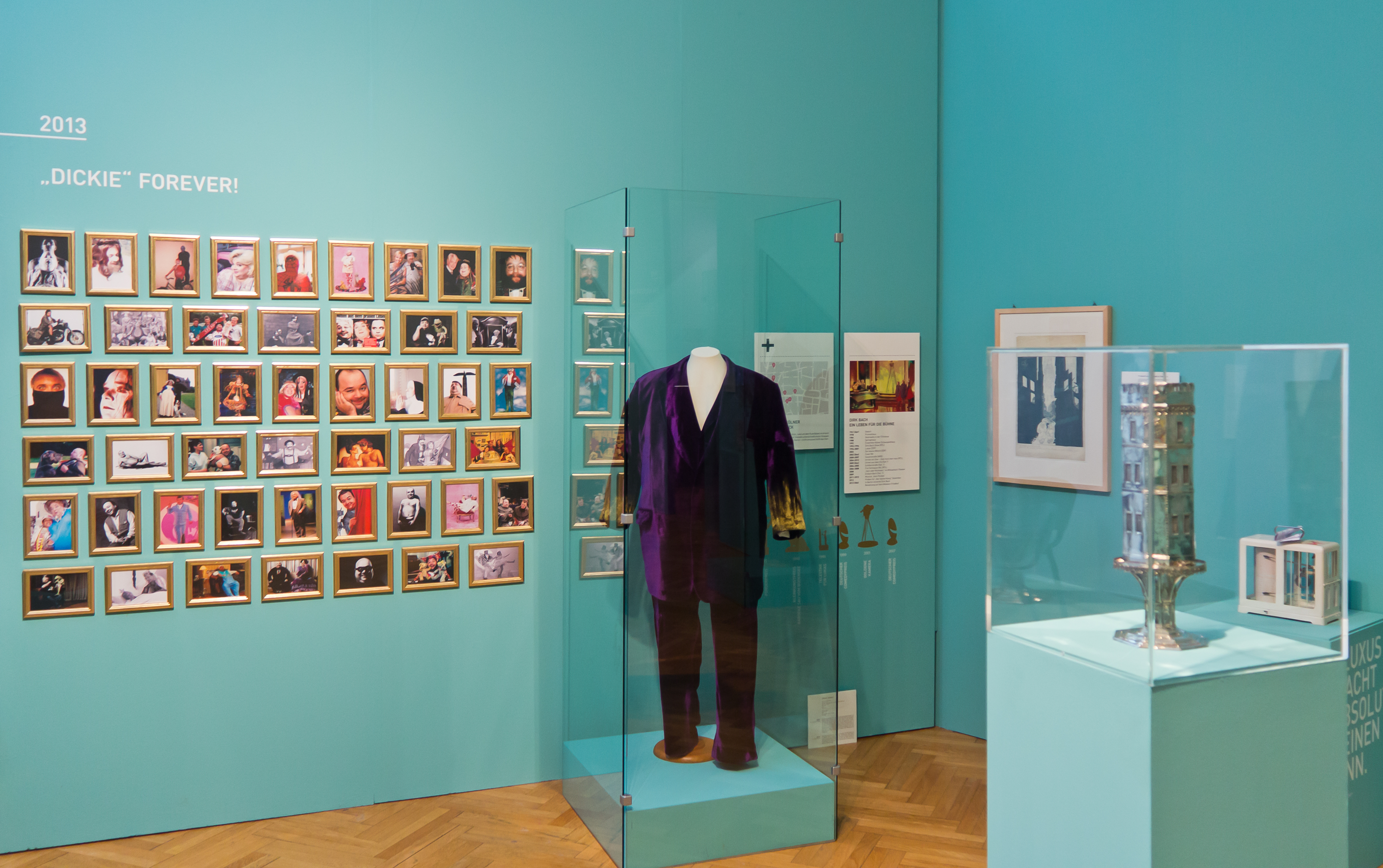
2013: "Dickie" forever!
- 2 July – 15 September 2013: Als die Welt nach Köln kam.
- 12 October 2013 – 9 February 2014 kleine KUBUS-Ausstellung: Josef Haubrich (1889–1961). Ein bewegtes Leben.
- 13 December 2013 – 27 April 2014: drunter und drüber: Der Eigelstein. Schauplatz Kölner Geschichte 2 (in cooperation with the Romano-Germanic Museum).
- 14 June – 5 October 2014: Köln in unheiligen Zeiten. Die Stadt in Thirty Years' War

This era, in which Europe was in a state of emergency, is the subject of an exhibition at the Kölnisches Stadtmuseum for the first time. War raged all around Cologne, but the city, intent on neutrality, was spared. Goods important to the war effort were traded and Cologne's merchants lent money to the warlords. At the same time, "Dat Hillije Coellen" was a Catholic bulwark in troubled times. Monasteries and convents were founded in Cologne.

Impressions from the exhibition 'Köln in unheiligen Zeiten'

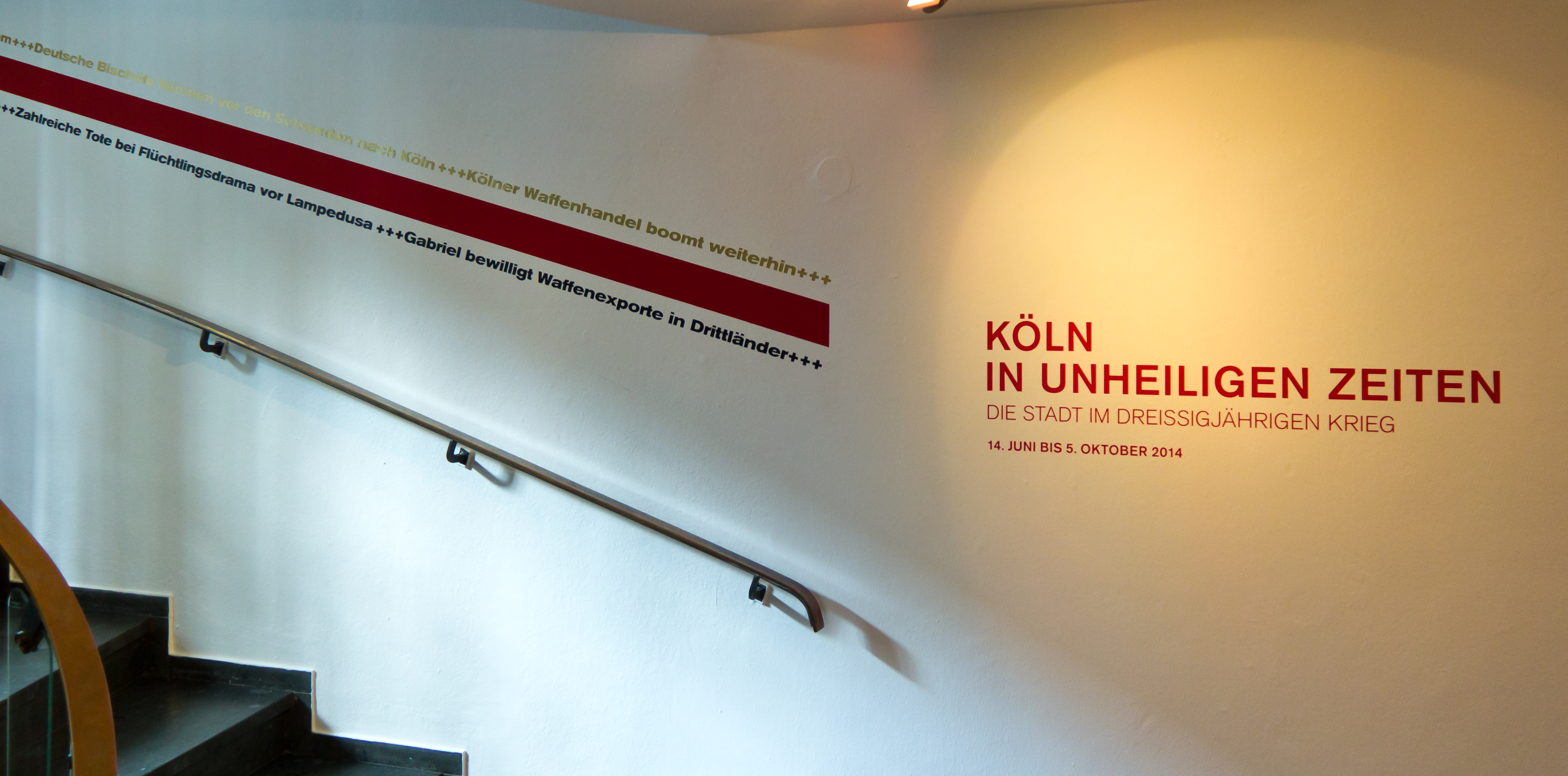
Cologne arms trade continues to flourish / Gabriel approves arms exports to third countries

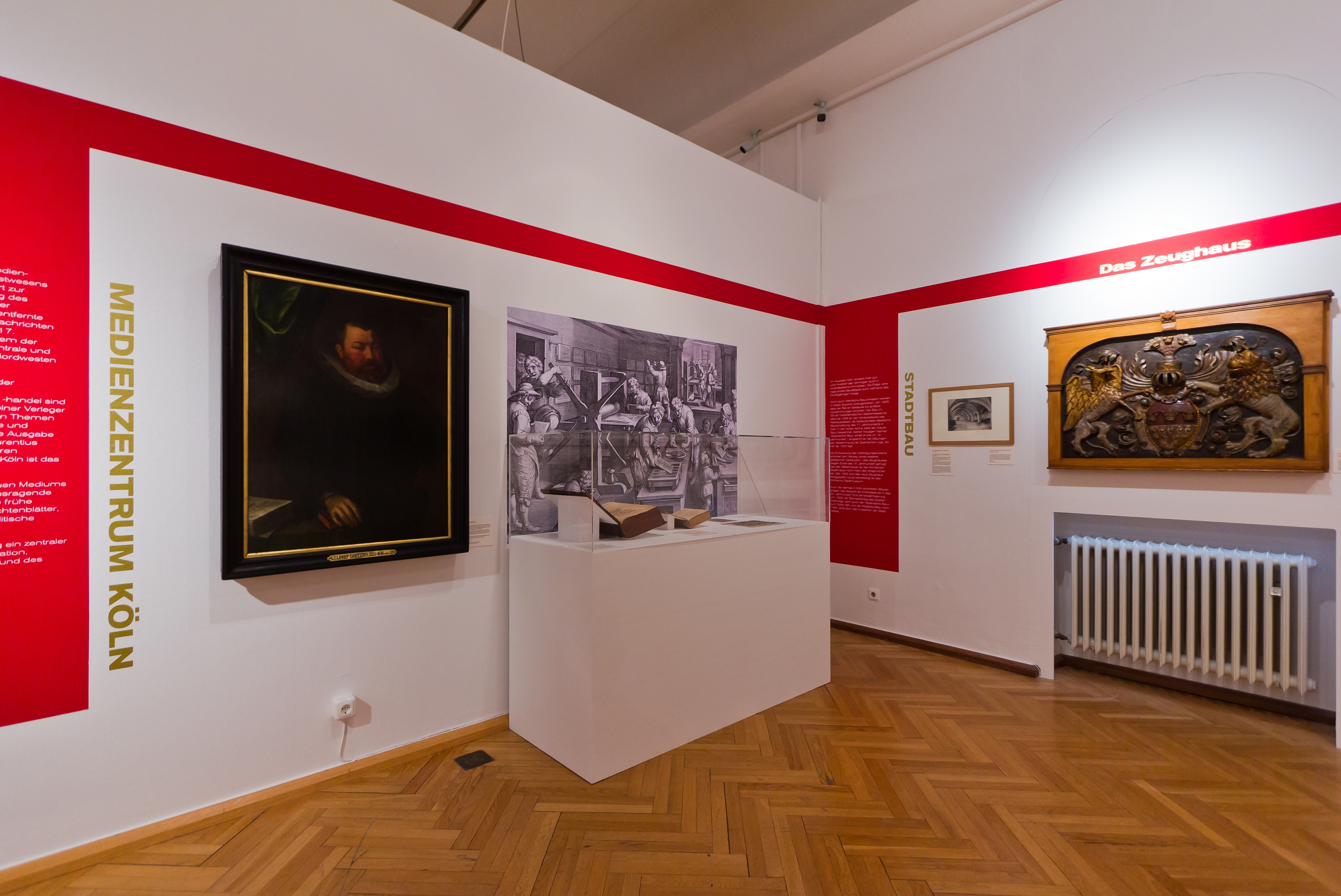
Media Centre Cologne

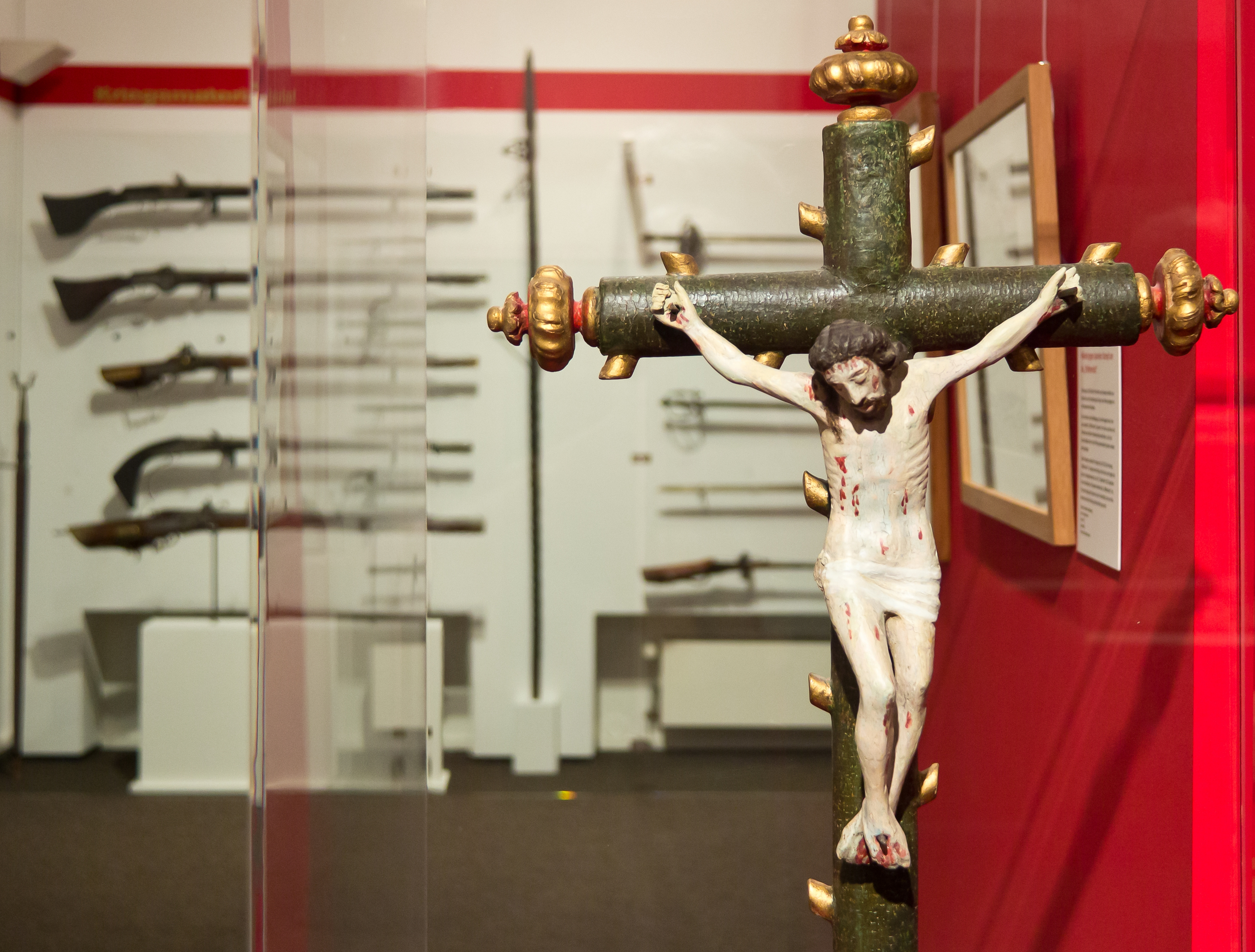
Crucifixion group from Kamp; rifles in the background

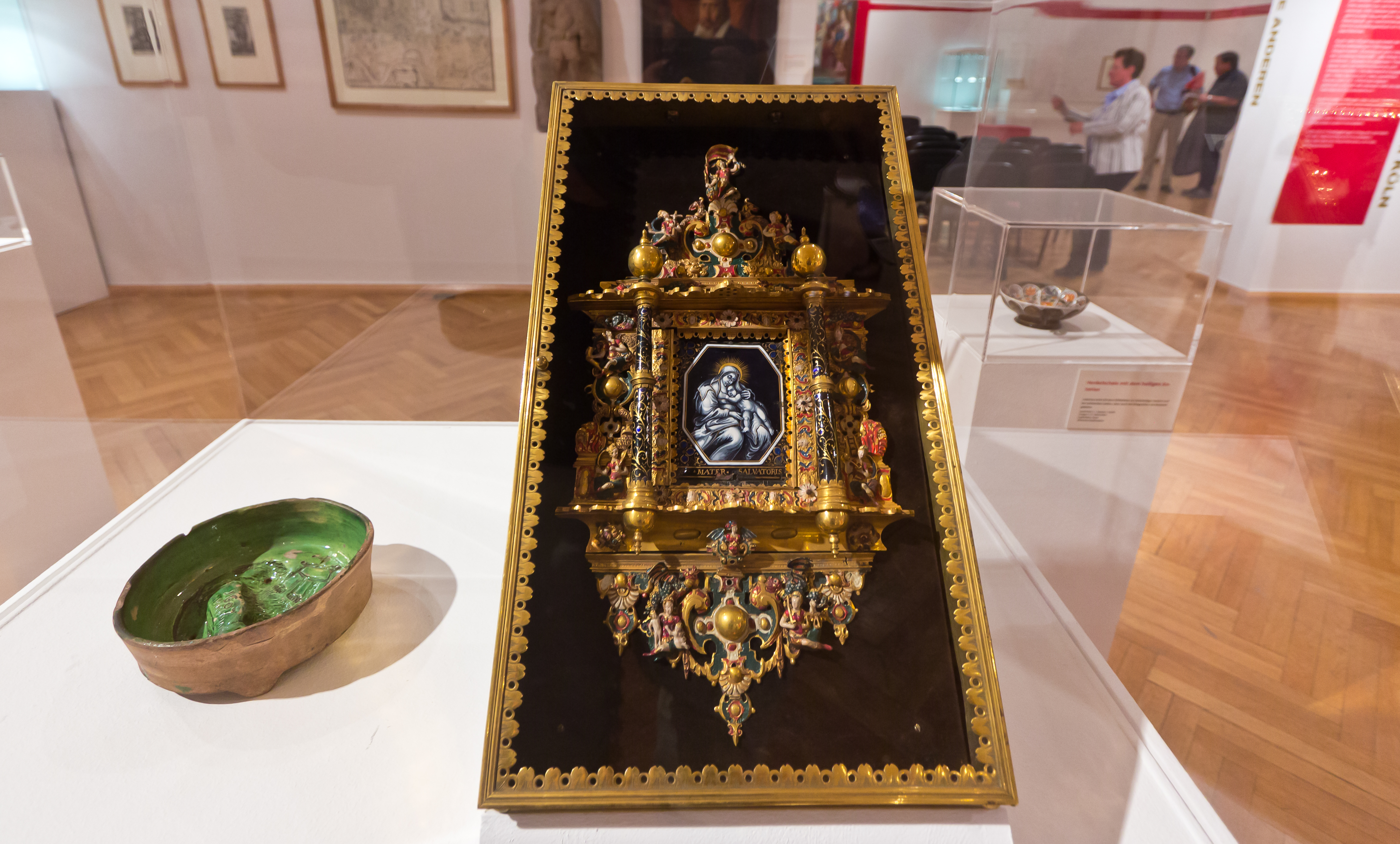
Lintel mould for an Easter lamb and house altar with Mother of God
- 22 November 2014 – 19 April 2015: Köln 1914 – Metropole im Westen

As part of the LVR joint project "1914 – In the Middle of Europe. The Rhineland and the First World War", the exhibition commemorates the beginning of the war and provides insights into life in the Rhineland city around 100 years ago. On display are clothes, electrical appliances, children's toys, evidence of artistic development and personal documents from contemporaries. At the same time, the Museum für Angewandte Kunst as well as the Rheinisch-Westfälisches Wirtschaftsarchiv dem Themenkomplex.

Impressions from the exhibition

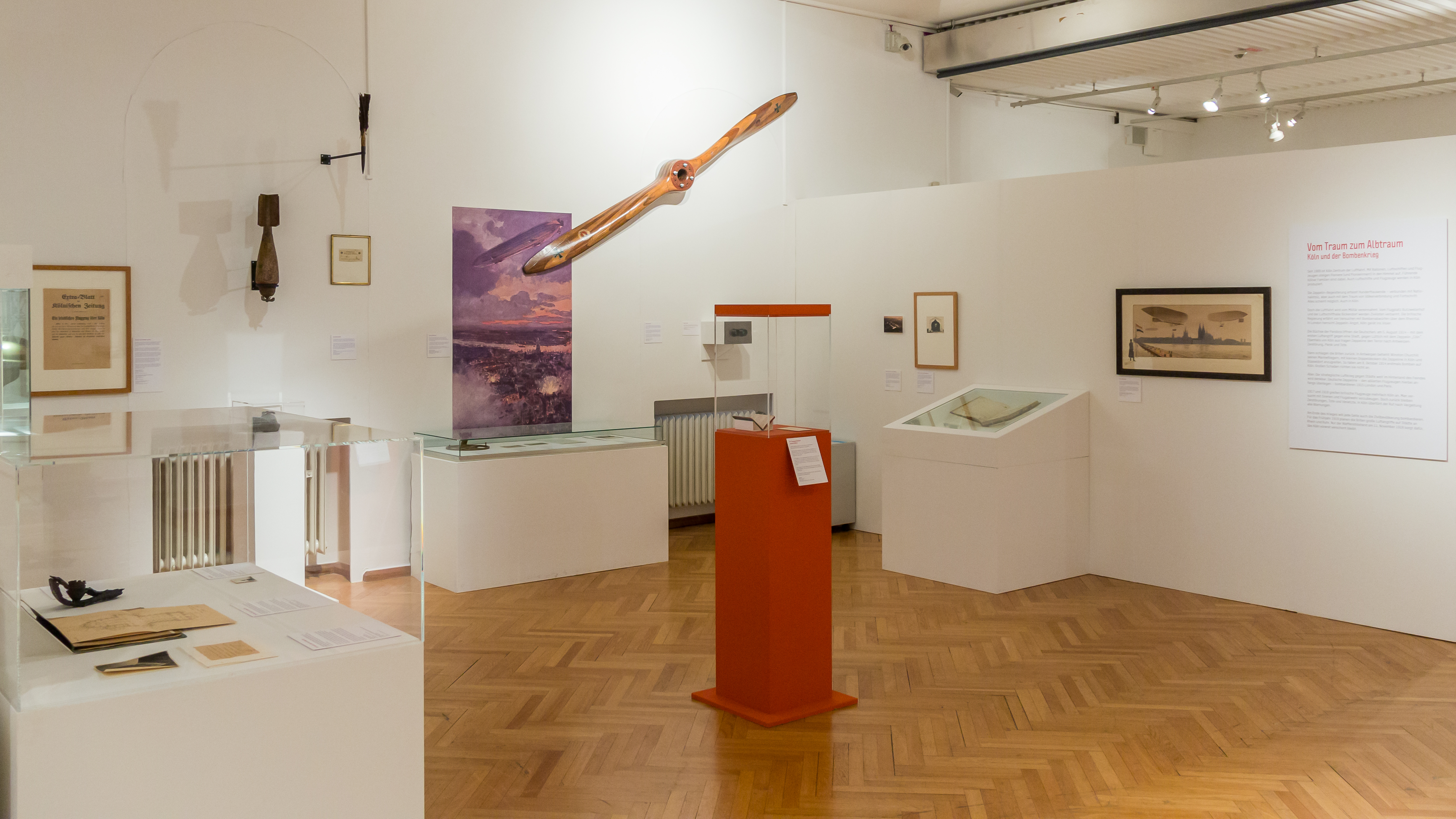
Vom Traum zum Albtraum

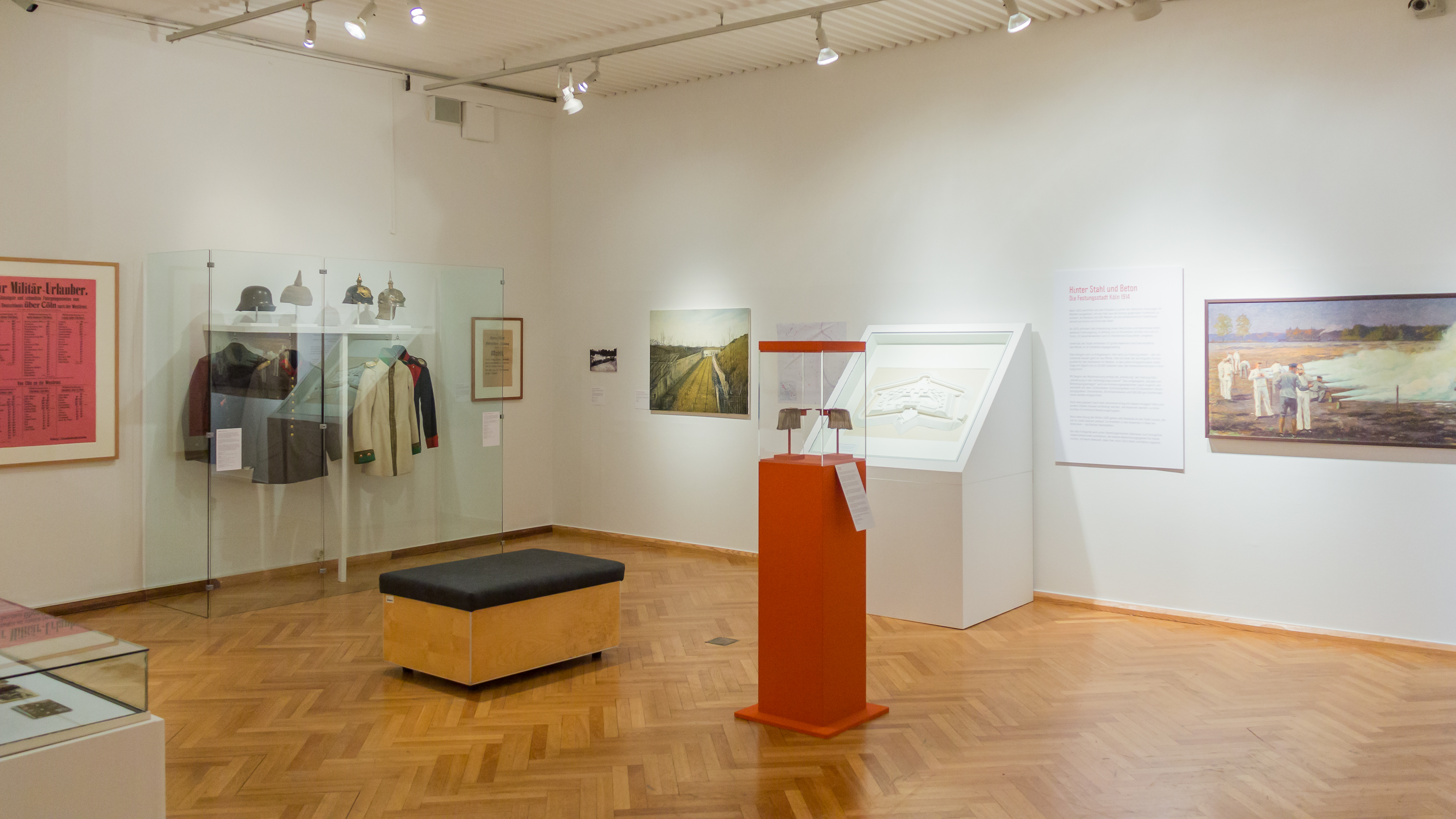
Hinter Stahl und Beton. Die Festungsstadt Köln

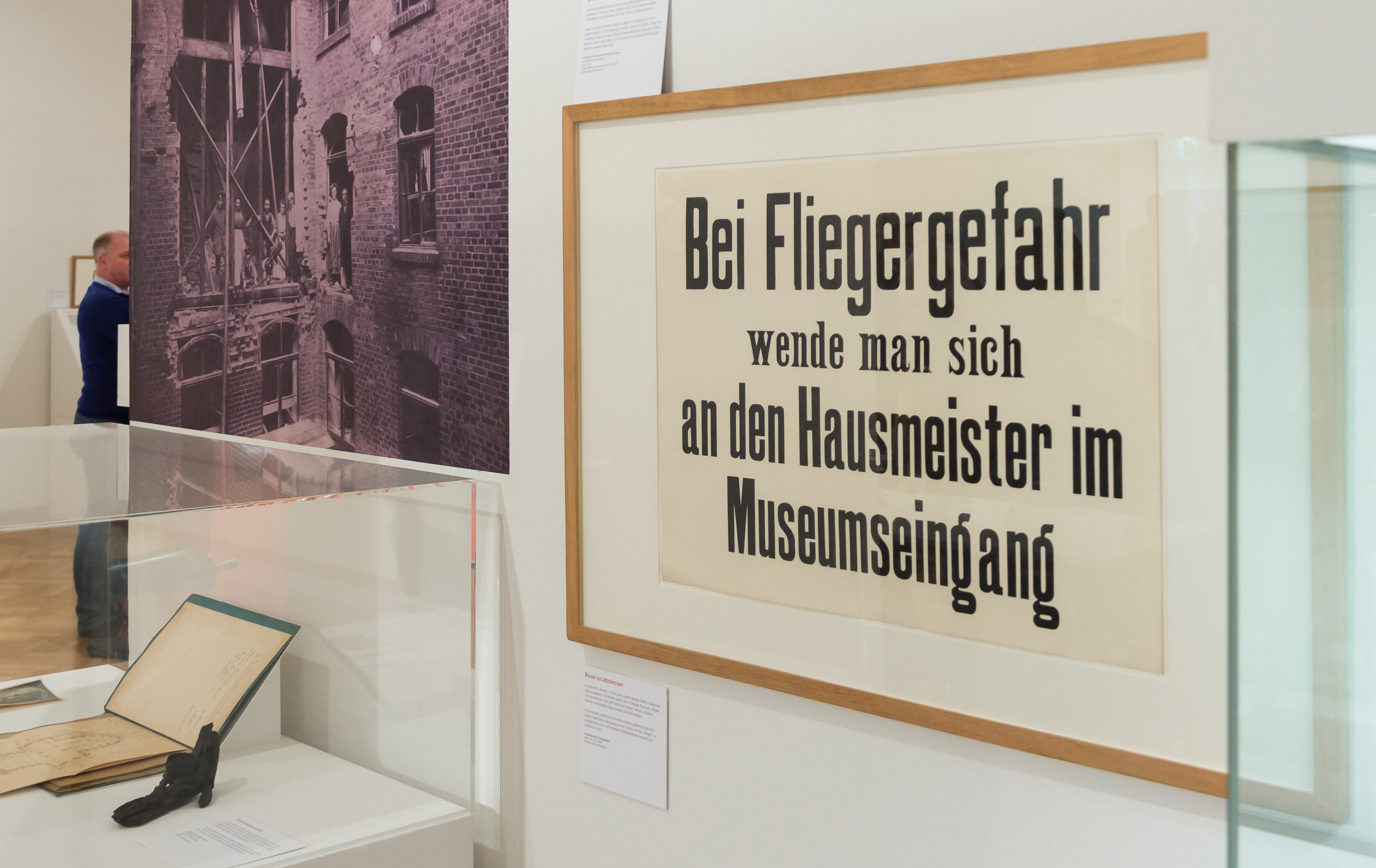
Bei Fliegergefahr ...

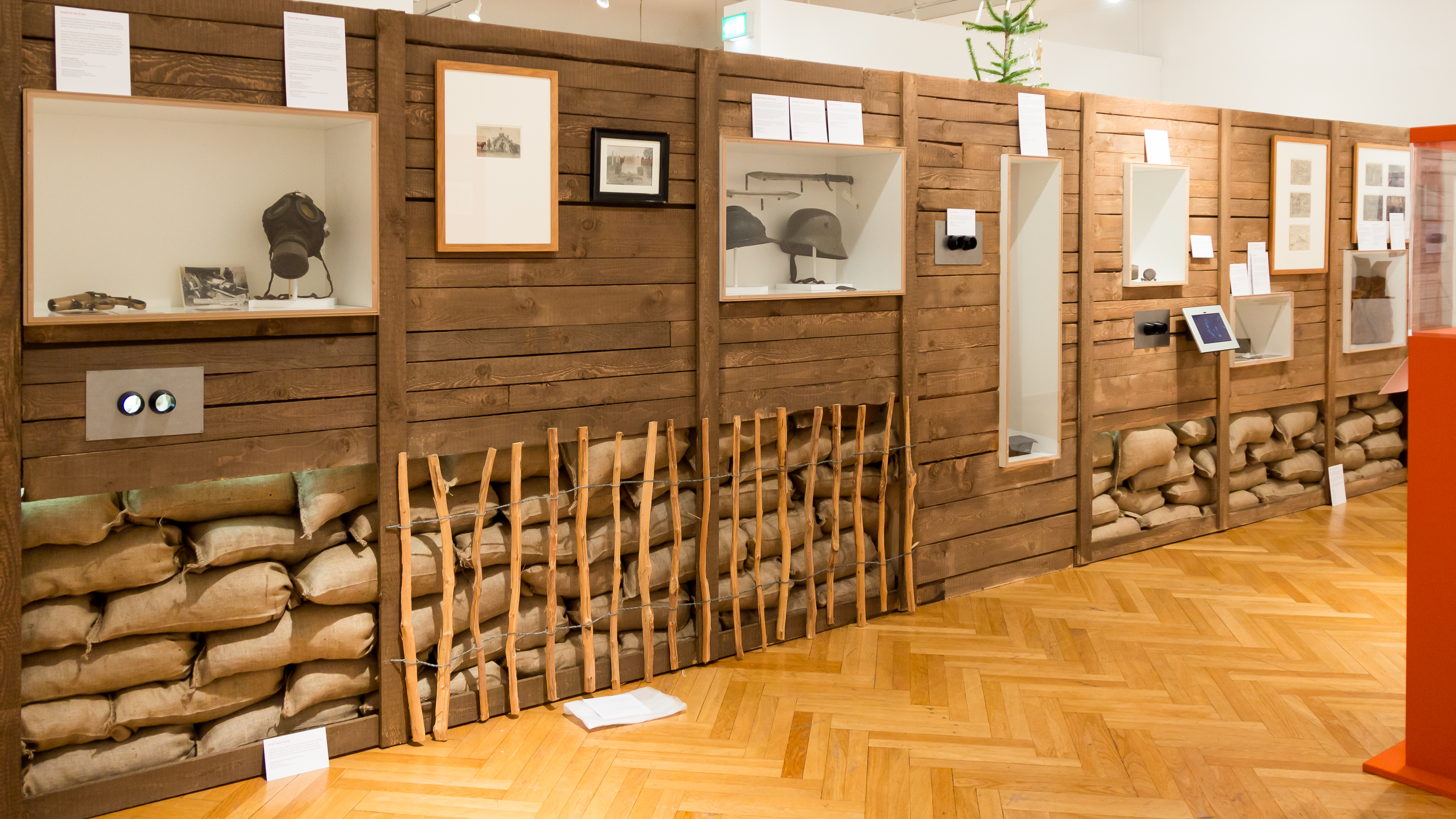
Im Schützengraben

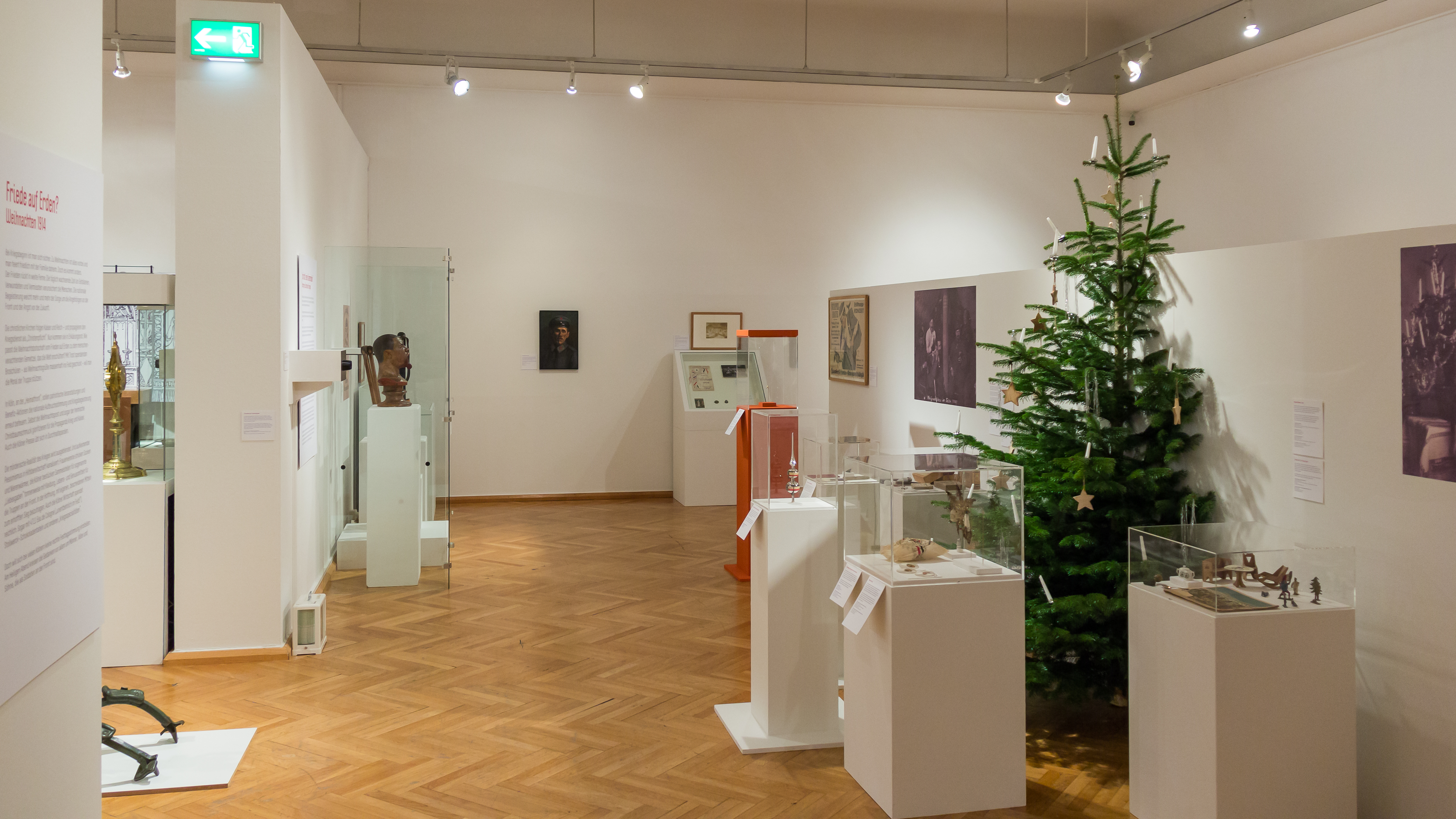
Friede auf Erden? Weihnachten 1914
- 12 December 2015 – 24 April 2016: ENDSTATION UBIERRING. 40 Das Aus des Fachbereichs Kunst und Design in der Kölner Südstadt.
- 21 November 2015 – 24 April 2016: Köln ungeschönt. Wilhelm Scheiner as Fotograf.
- 11 March – 12 June 2016: Kleine KUBUS-Ausstellung: in collaboration with the Deutsches Staubarchiv: Unter Kölner Dächern – Kölner Staub als Objektkunst und Fotografie
- 4 June – 6 September 2016: Grosses Kino! 120 Jahre Kölner Kinogeschichte
- 24 June – 25 September 2016: Small cube exhibition Carl Niessen and the Kölner Theatermuseum
- 10 December 2016 – 14 May 2017: in the series Schauplatz Kölner Geschichte 3 Drunter und Drüber: The Eigelstein Schauplatz Kölner Geschichte., in collaboration with the Romano-Germanic Museum.
Impressions from the exhibition

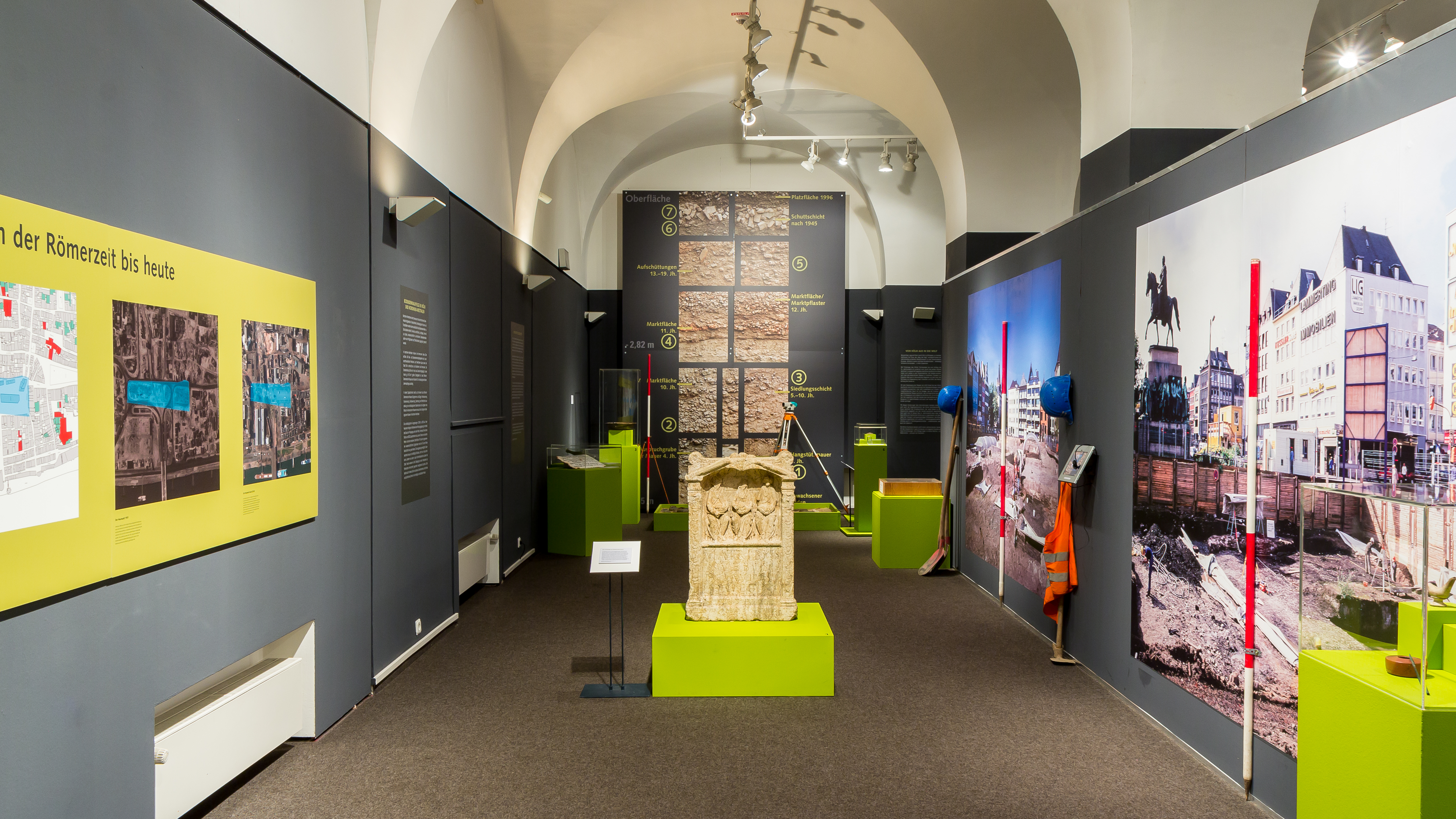

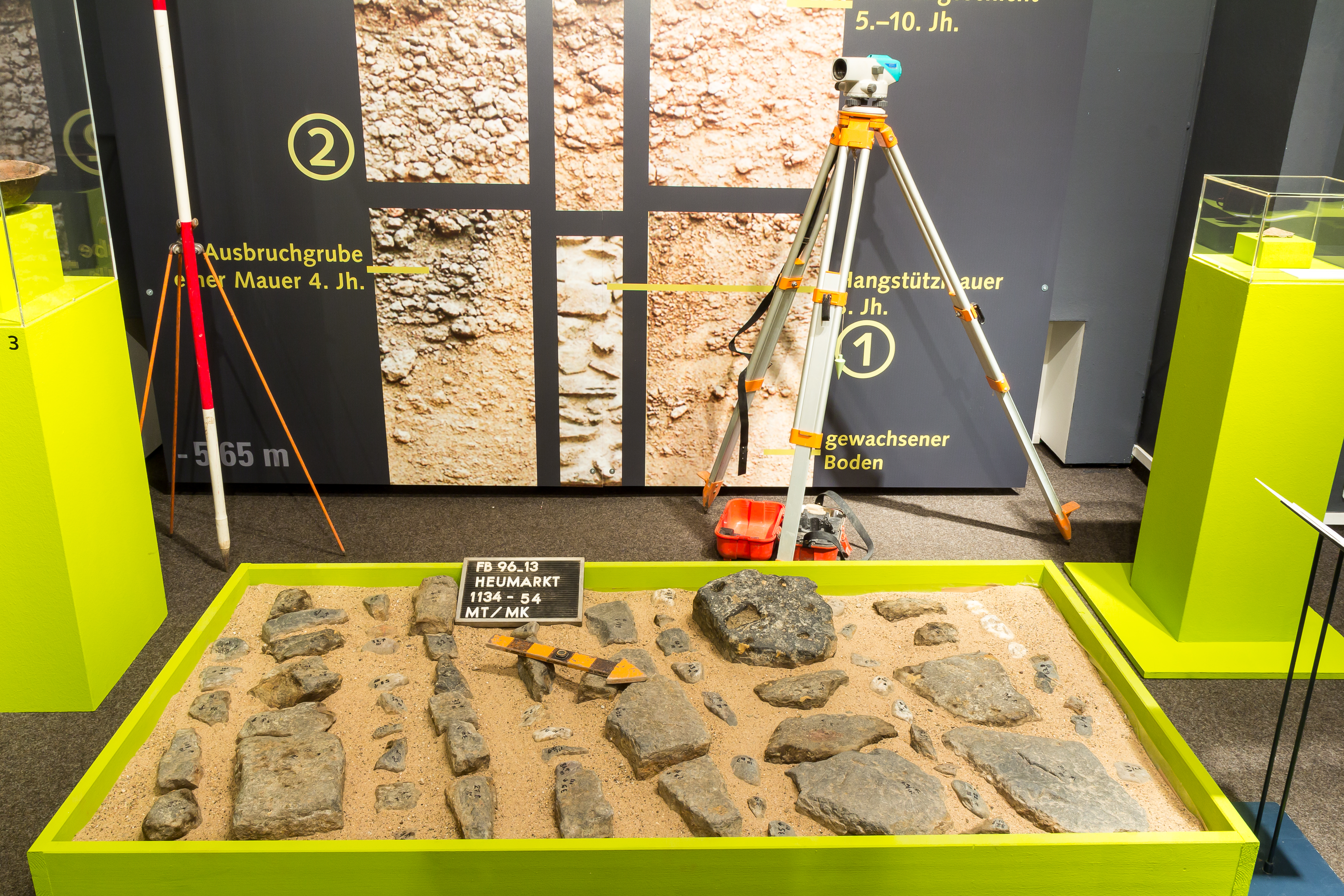

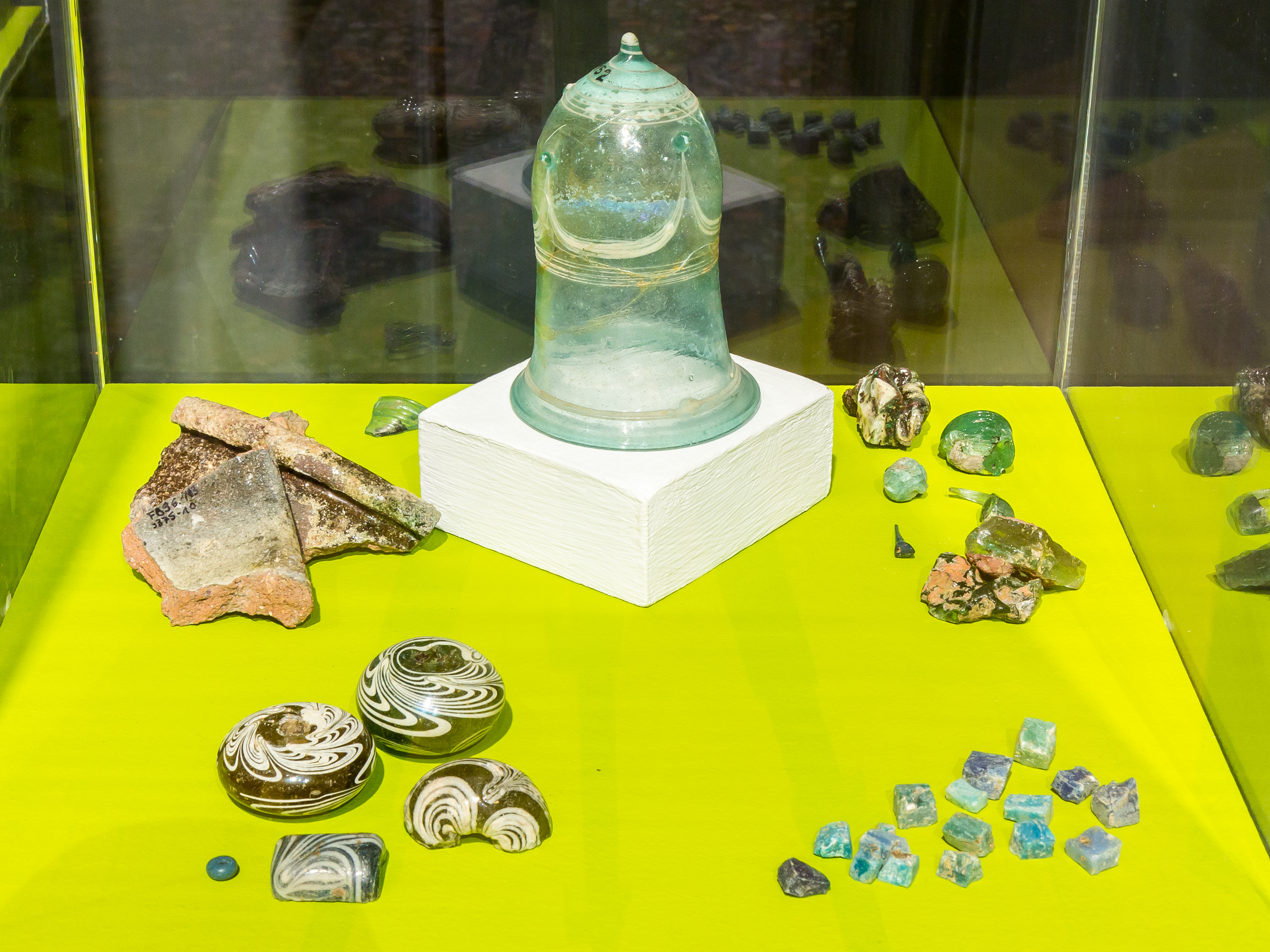

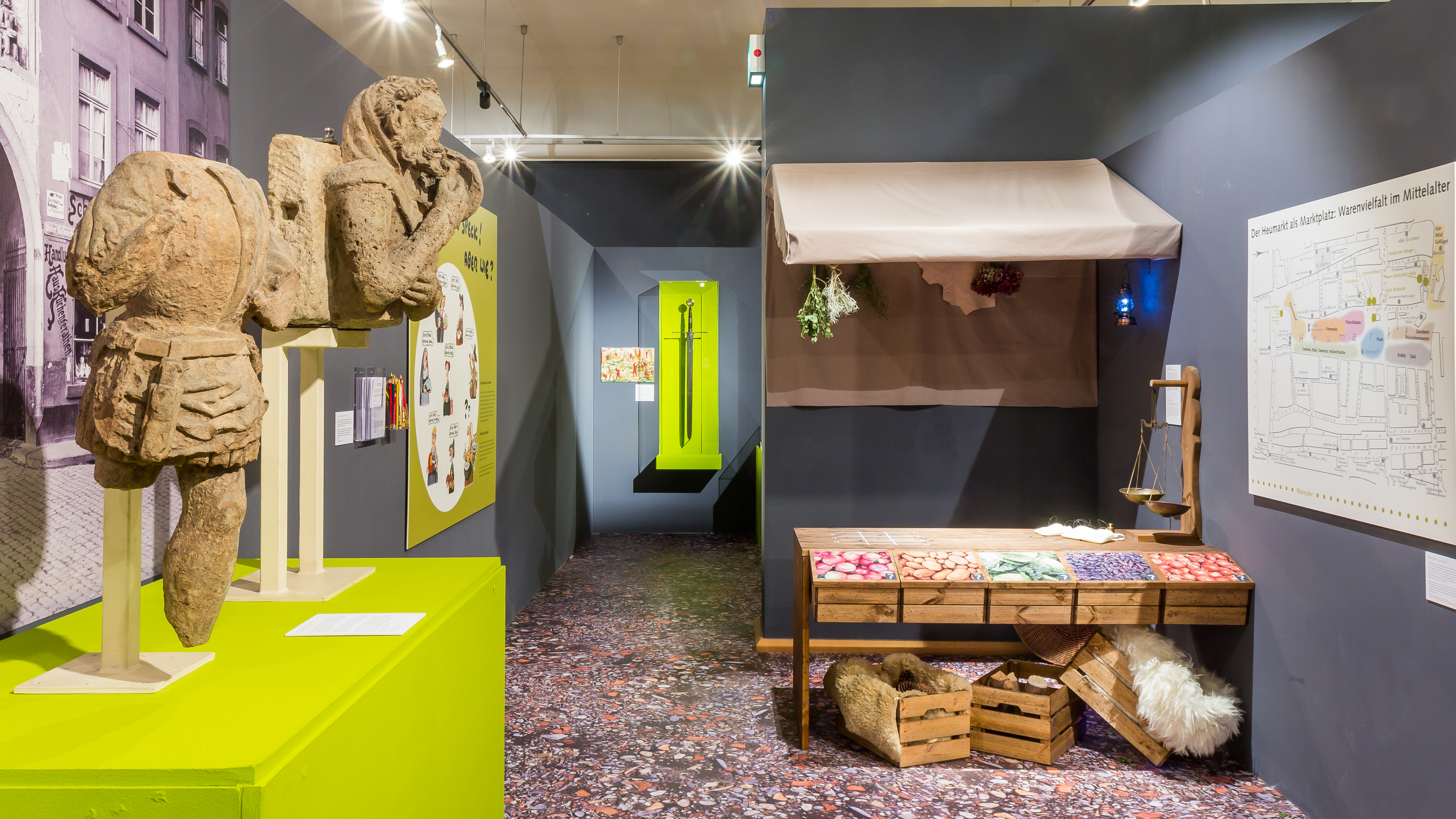

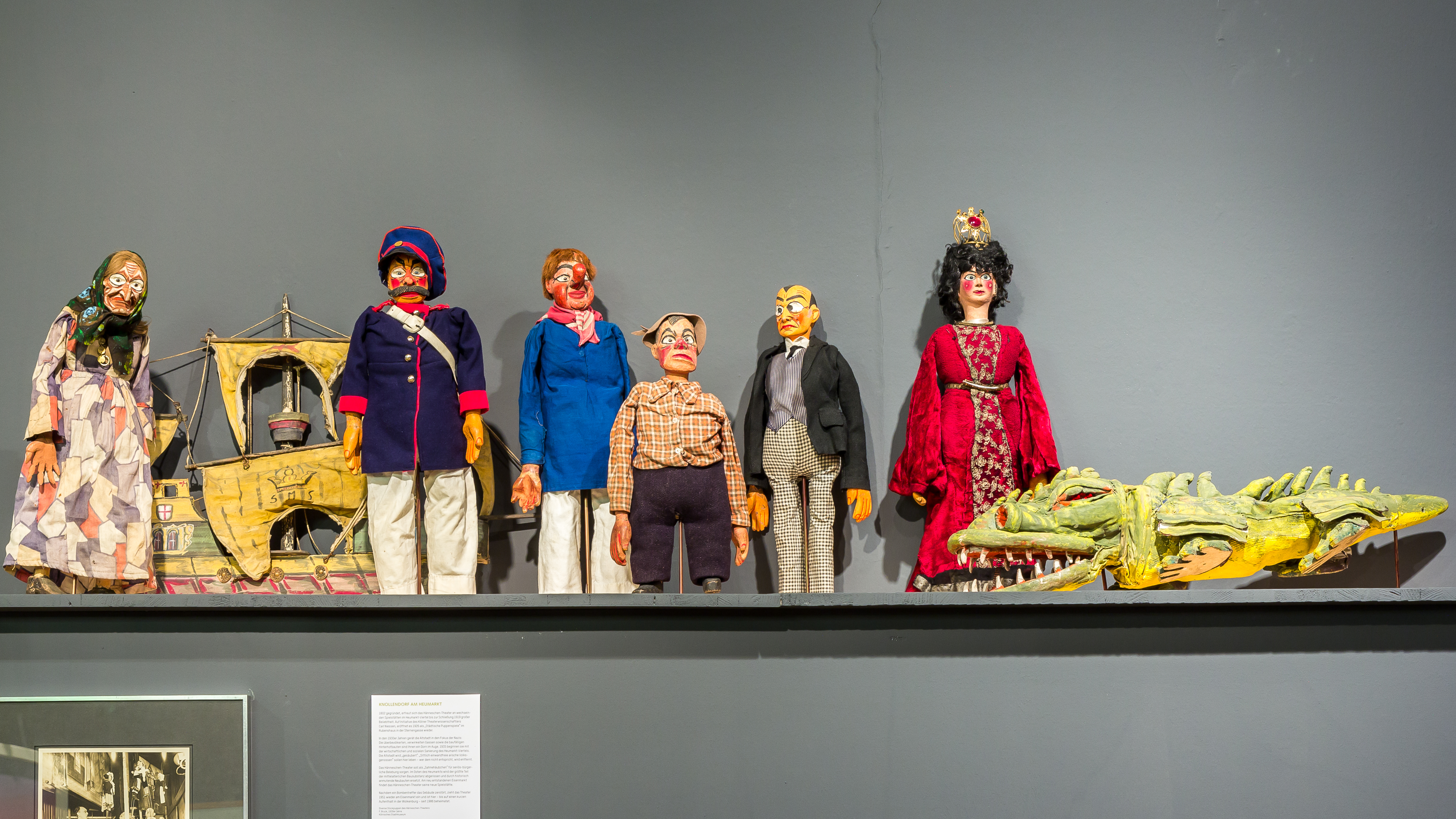
- 24 March 2017 – 11 May 2017: Small KUBUS exhibition Bosporus am Rhein. Das Restaurant Bosporus in der Weidengasse
- 1 July 2017 – 19 November 2017: Konrad der Grosse. Die Adenauer-Ära in Köln 1917–1933
Impressions from the exhibition 'Konrad der Grosse. Die Adenauerzeit in Köln 1917–1933'

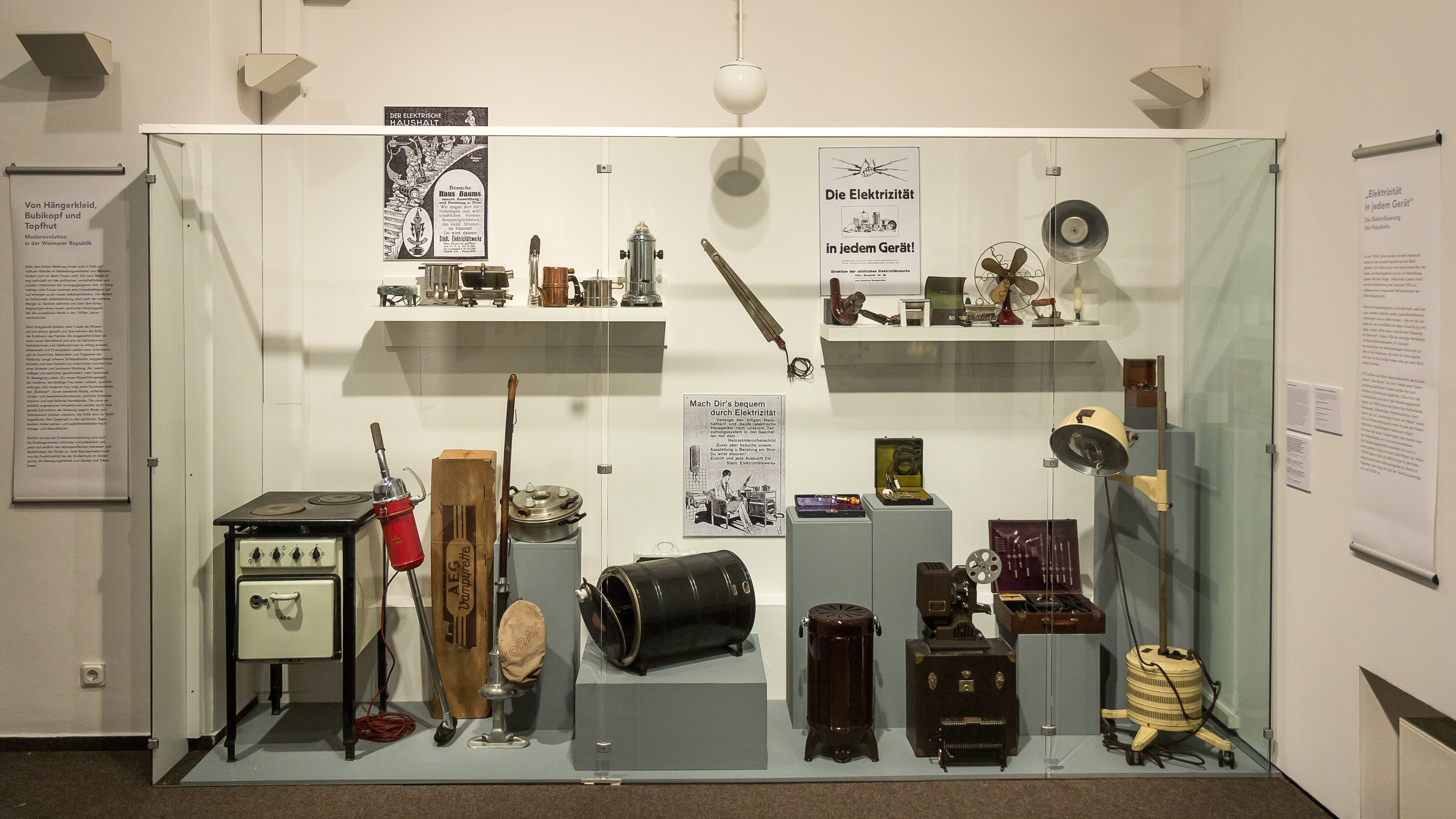

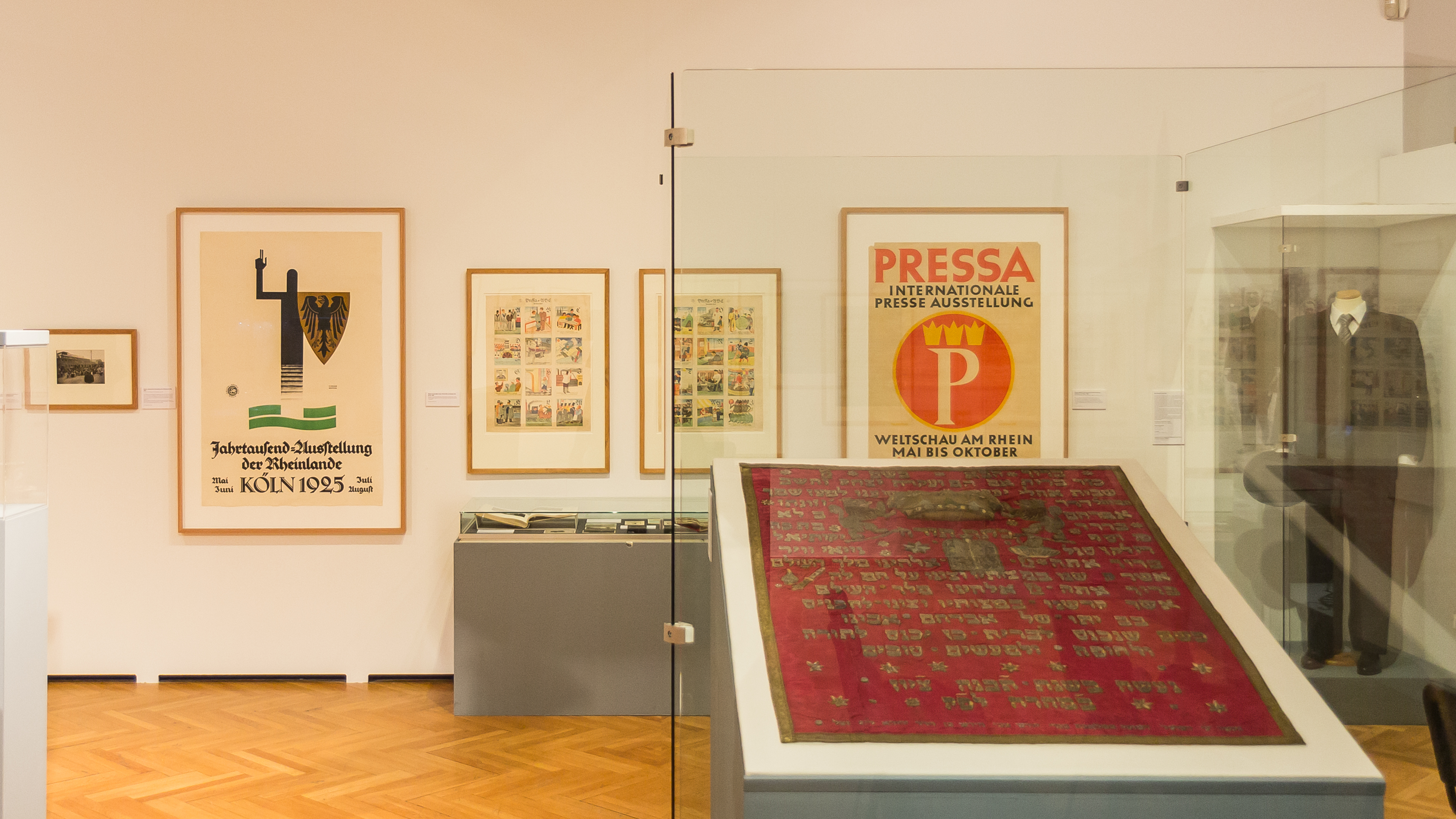

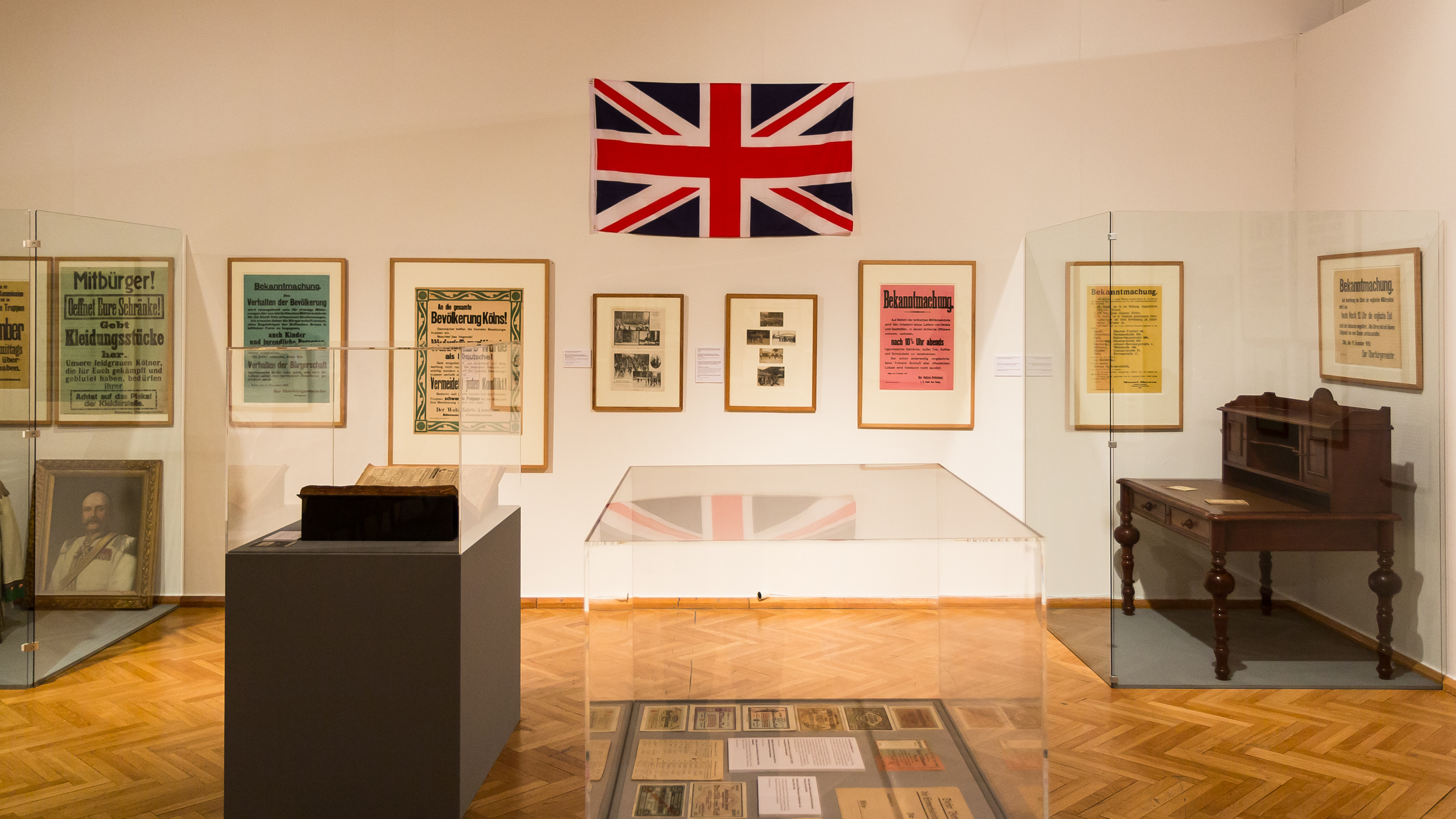

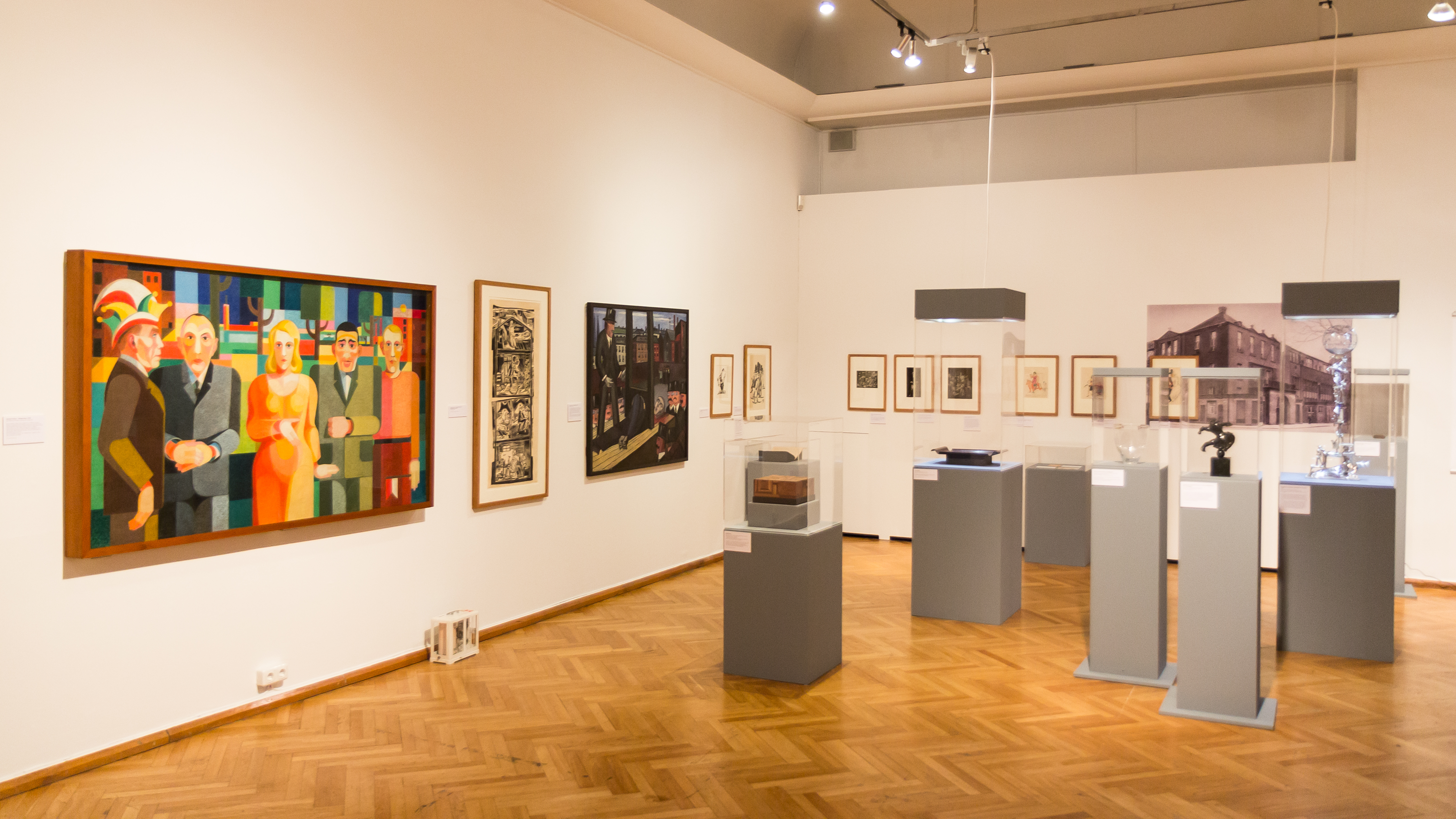

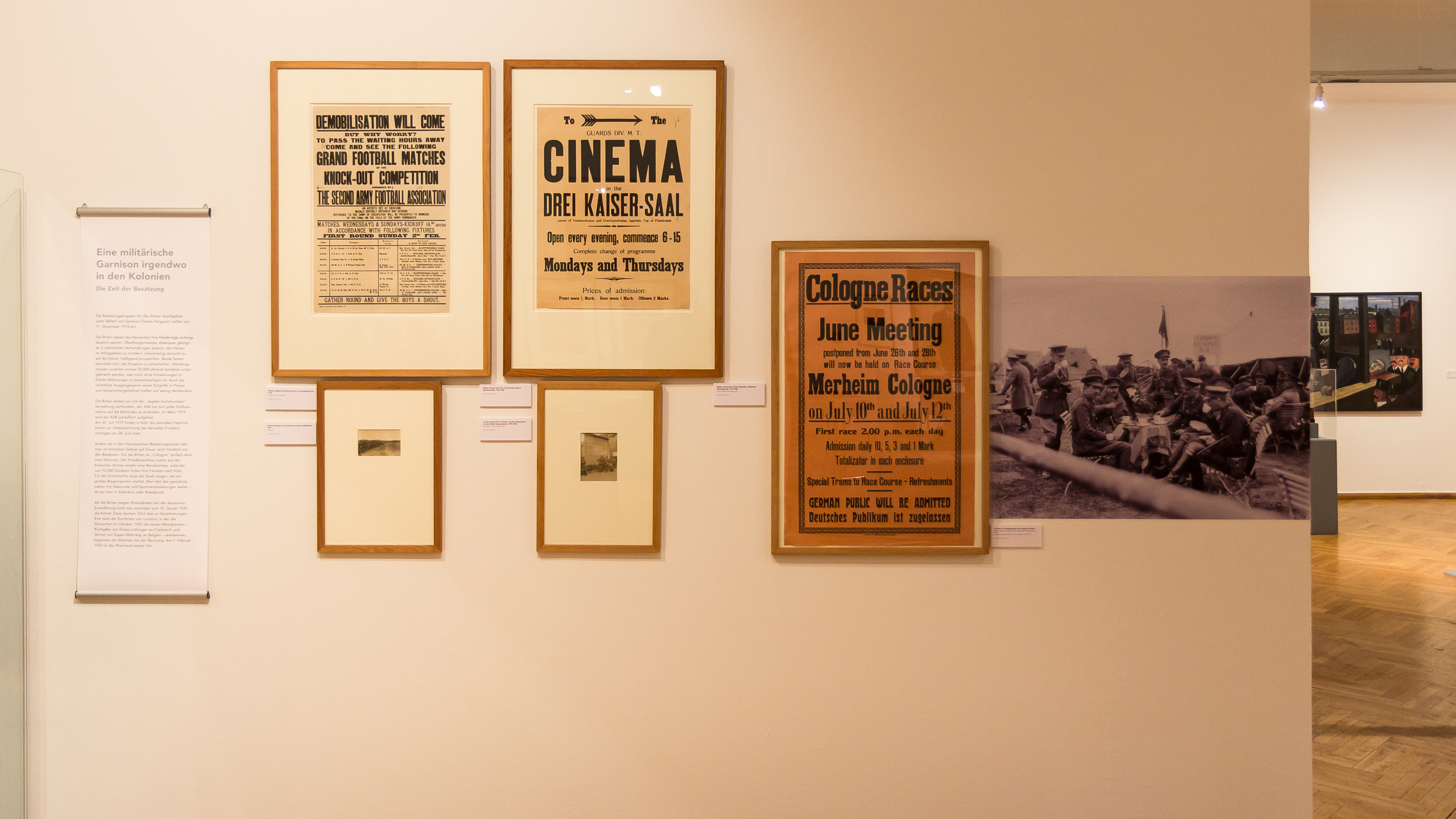
- 16 December 2017 – 25 March 2018: Karin Richert: Im rechten Licht
- 16 December 2017 – 25 March 2018: Trotzdem Alaaf! Kölner Rosenmontag 1991 + 2017
Impressions from the exhibition

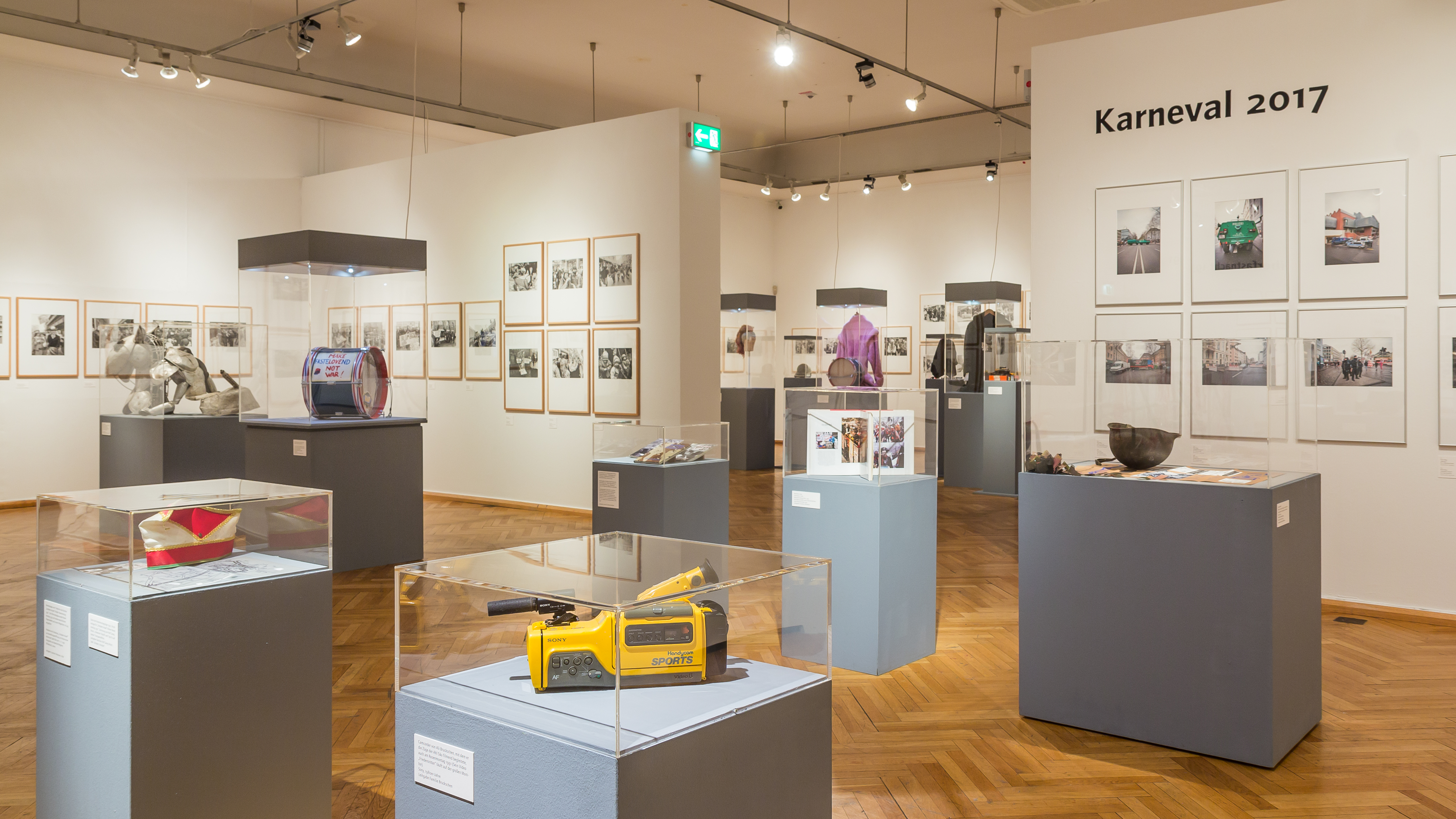

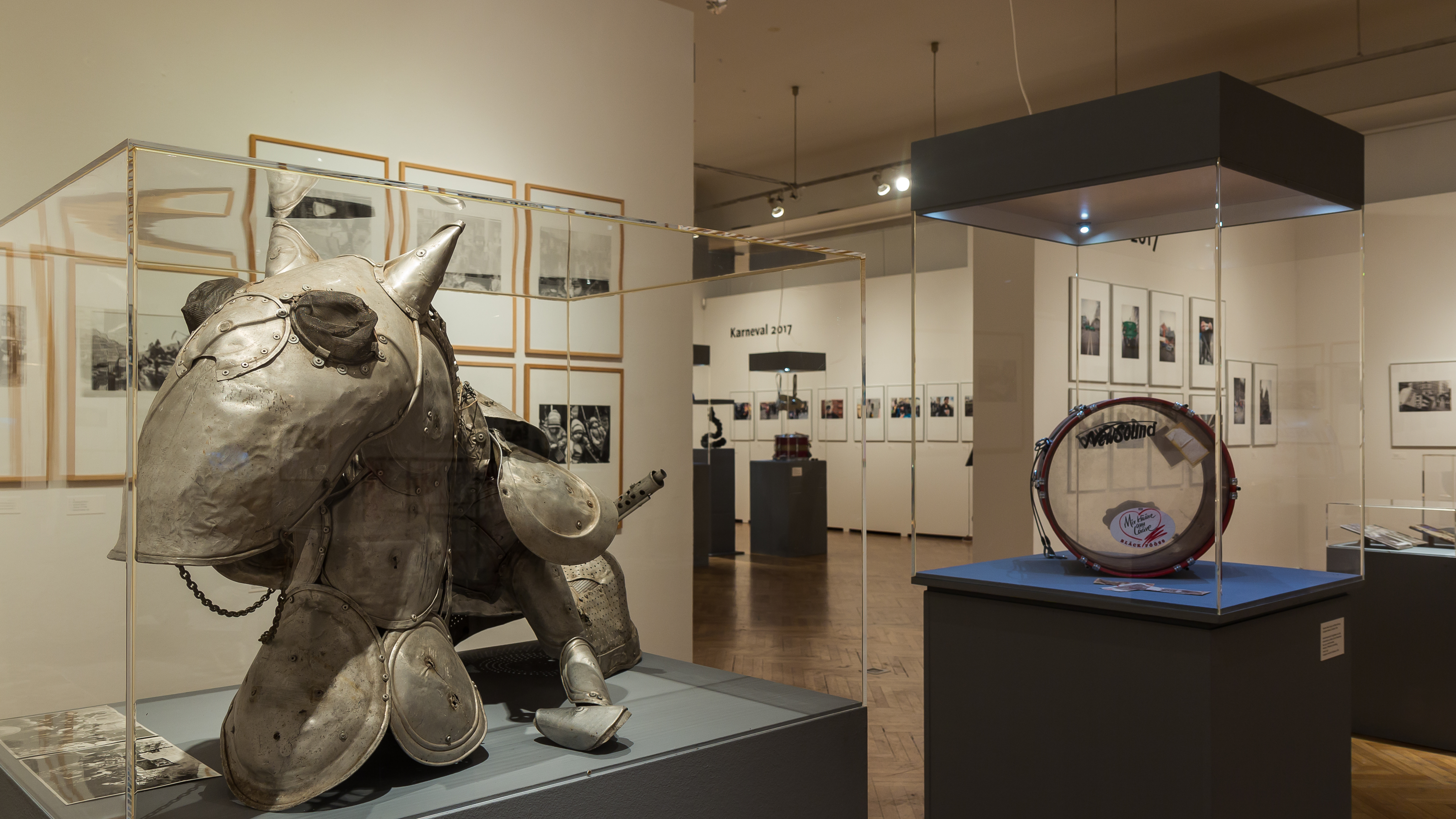

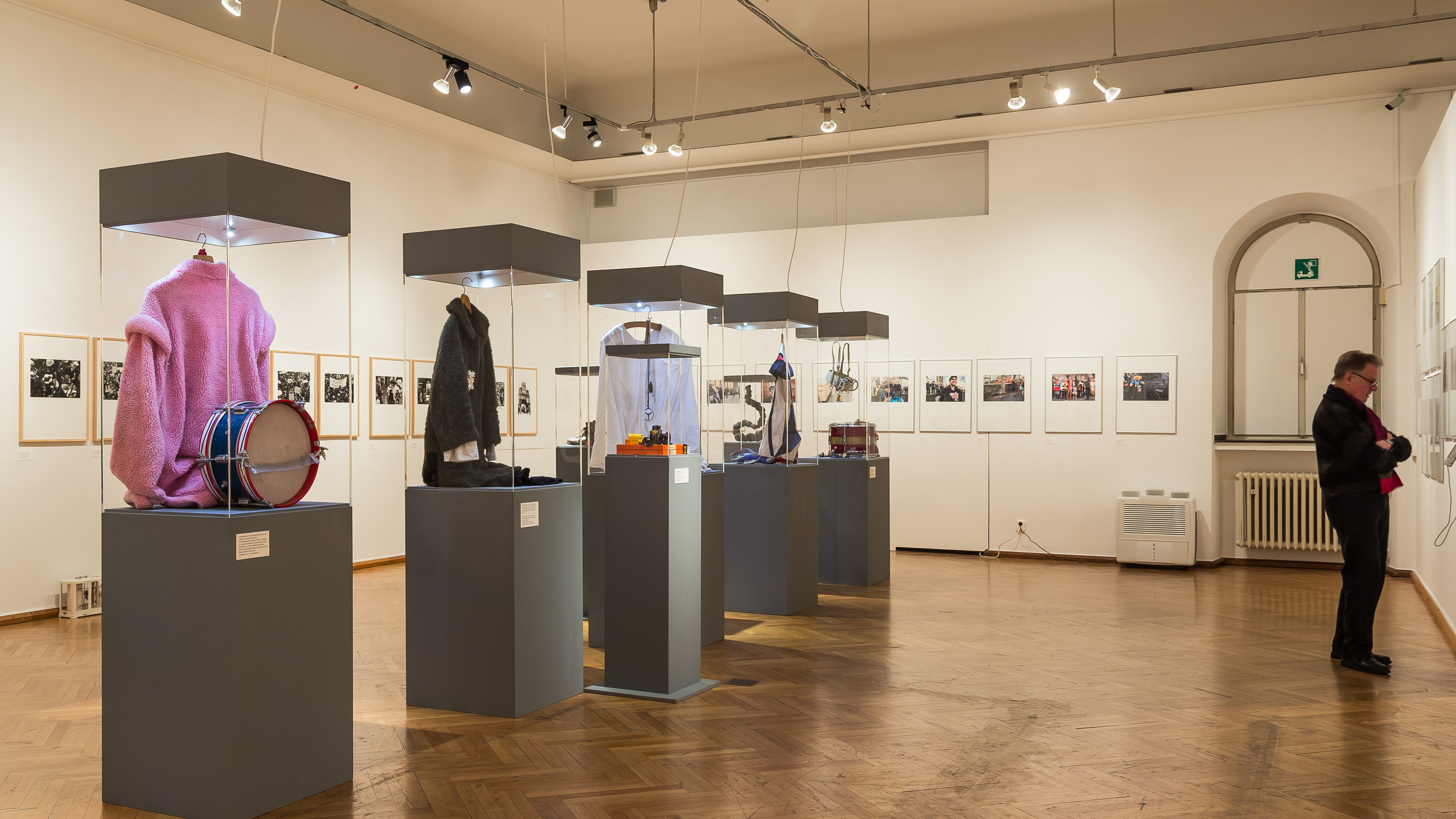

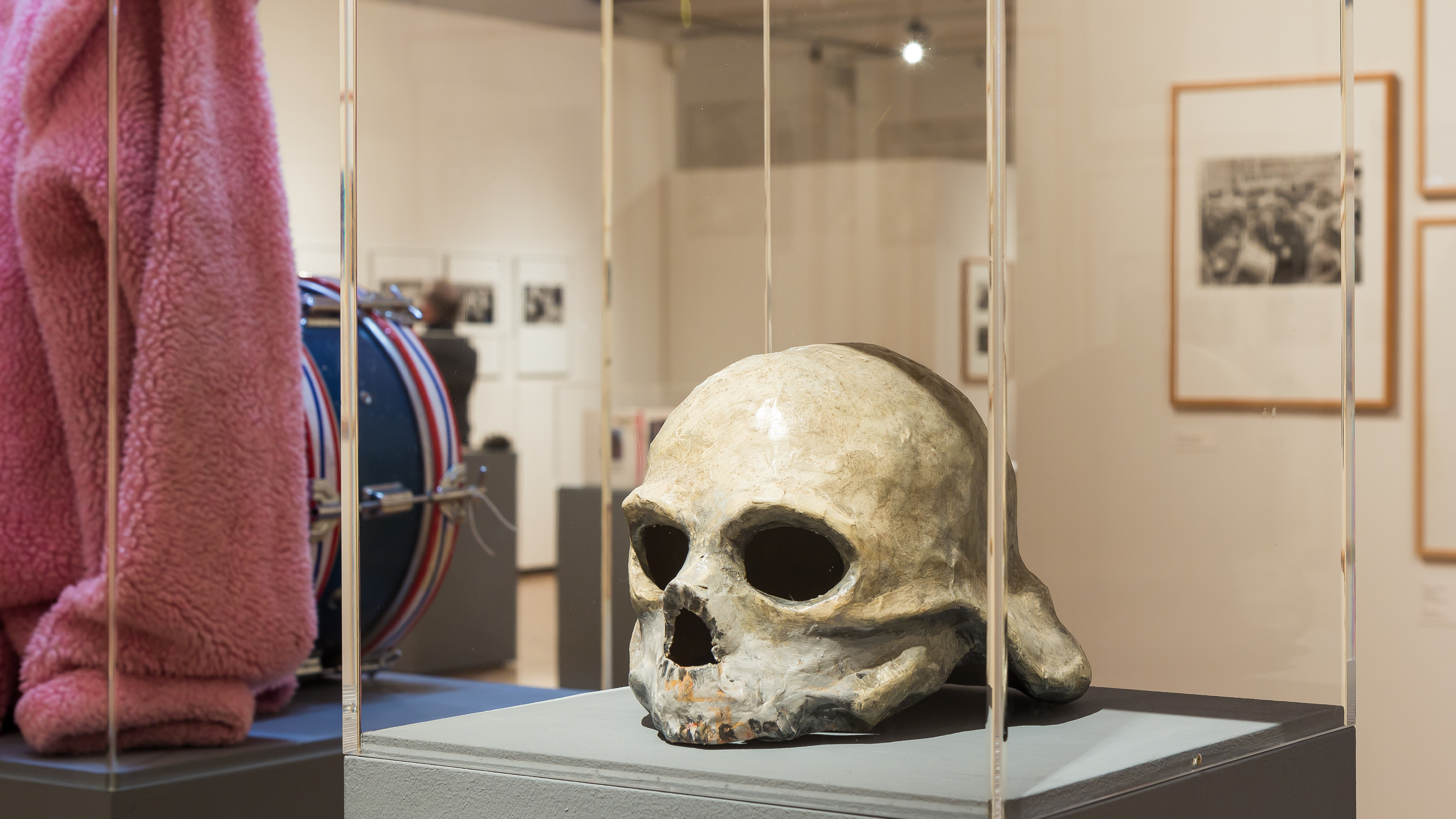
- 5 May 2018 – 26 August 2018: Bretter, die die Welt bedeuten. Spielend durch 2000 Jahre Köln
- 20 October 2018 – 31 March 2019: Köln 68! Protest. Pop. Provokation.
- 4 May – 14 July 2019: Ronit Porat. Paradiesvogel – Artist meets archive, in cooperation with the International Photoscene Cologne
- 4 May – 14 July 2019: You are here – Versuche einer fotografischen Standortbestimmung, Teil 1, in cooperation with the International Photoscene Cologne
- 24 August 2019 – 26 January 2020: Köln an der Seine. Der Pavillon der Stadt Köln auf der Pariser Weltausstellung 1937
- 24 August 2019 – 26 January 2020: Köln am Rhein oder: Von Zeit zu Zeit (in cooperation with the Rheinisches Bildarchiv)
Impressions from the exhibition

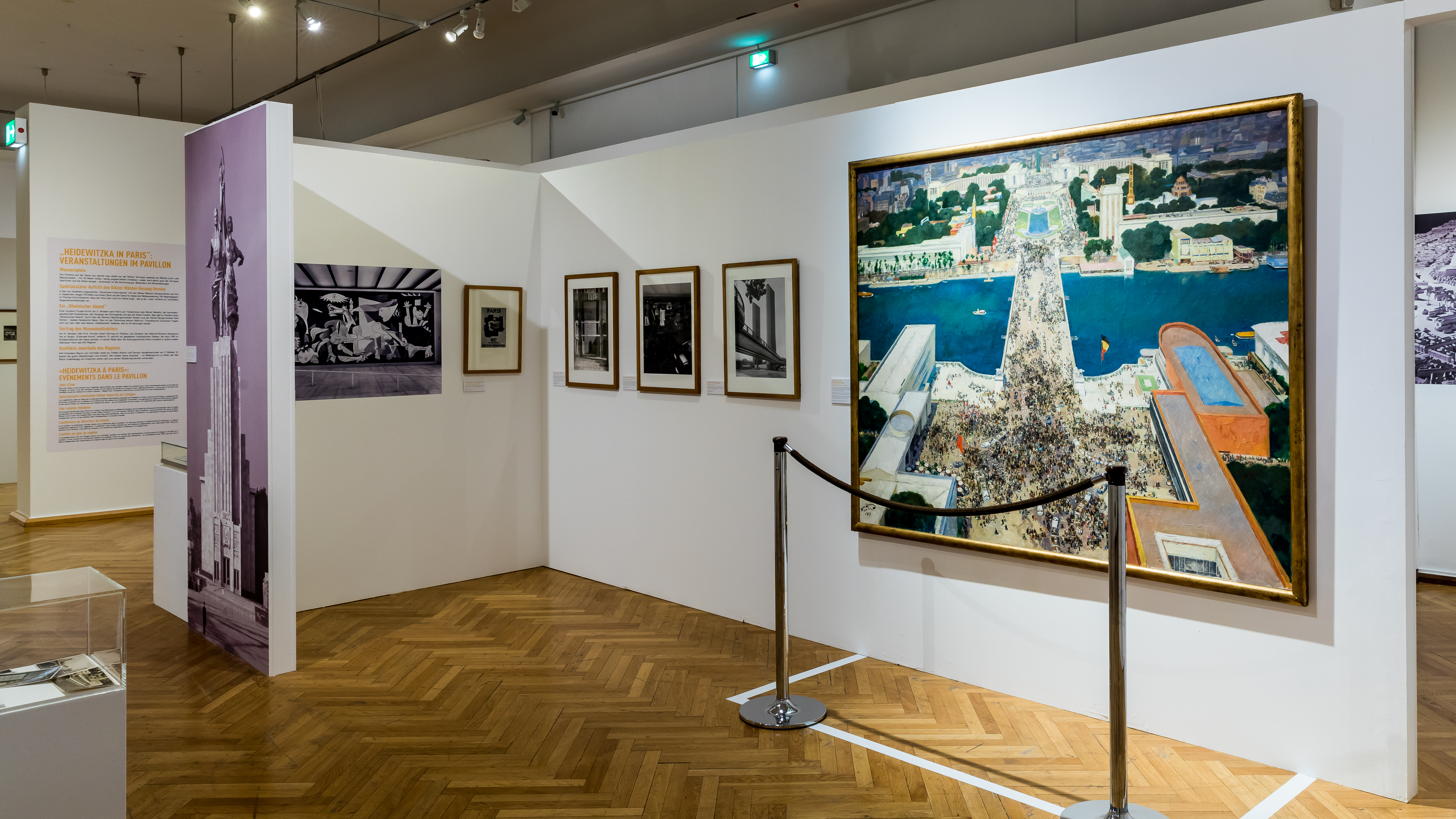

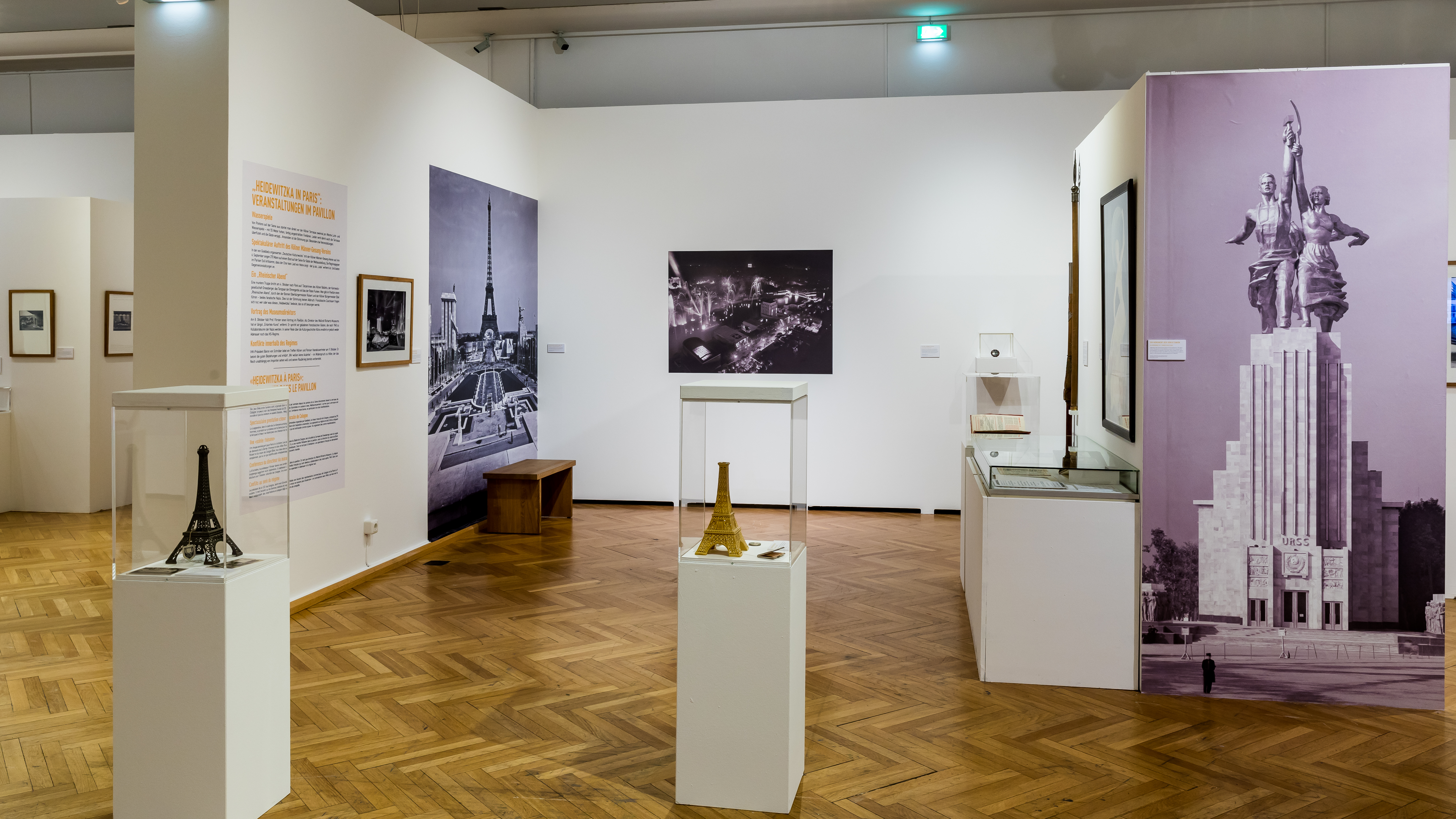

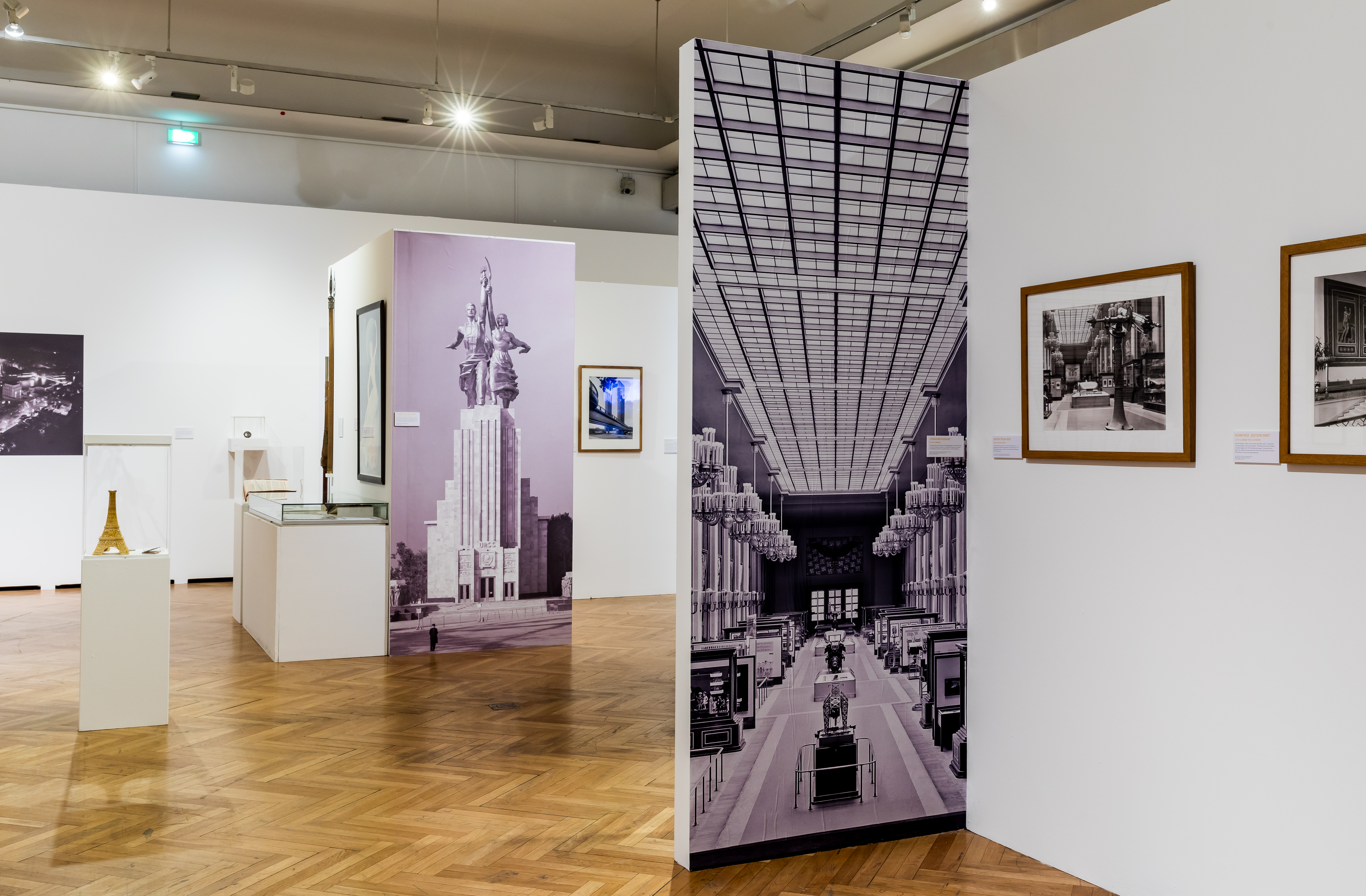

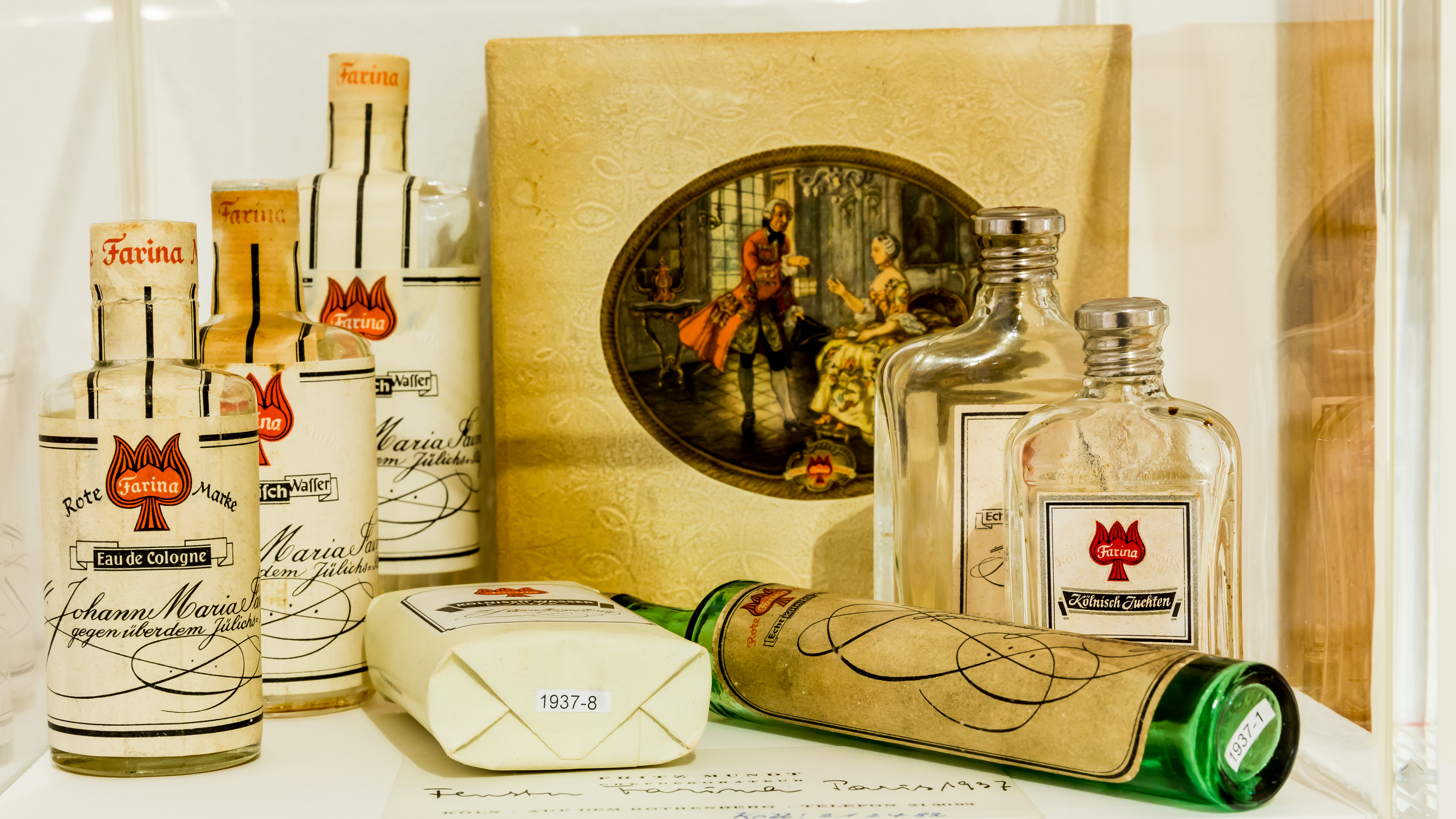

== Guided tours ==
The museum offers guided tours of its collection holdings in High German, in Kölsch and – in addition to English – in Turkish.

== Library ==
A publicly accessible reference library complements the museum's offerings. Around 50,000 media units on Cologne's city history and the history of the Rhineland are provided here. Scientific journals and exhibition catalogues as well as general works on cultural, economic and social history are in the collection. A collection of old prints from the 15th to the 19th century can be used as source material for various topics by arrangement. The library catalogue has been continuously digitised since 2019.

== Directors ==
- 1888–1894: Arthur Pabst
- 1894–1924: Joseph Hansen
- 1925–1950: Wilhelm Ewald
- 1950–1965: Franz Brill
- 1966–1974: Günther Albrecht
- 1974–1976: Hugo Borger
- 1976–1984: Heiko Steuer
- 1984 – July 2009: Werner Schäfke
- 2009–2010: Michael Euler-Schmidt (provisional)
- Since June 2010: Mario Kramp
