= Jan A. Ahlers =

German entrepreneur and art collector

- Born: 22 December 1934; Oldenburg, Germany
- Died: 31 December 2013 (aged 79)
- Occupations: Entrepreneur, Art collector
- Known for: Expansion of Ahlers AG, Art collection
- Notable work: Ahlers Pro Arte Foundation
- Family: Adolf Ahlers (father), Dirk Ahlers (brother)

Jan A. Ahlers (born 22 December 1934 in Oldenburg in Oldenburg; died 31 December 2013) was a German entrepreneur and art collector in Herford.

== Life ==
Jan A. Ahlers was born the son of textile entrepreneur Adolf Ahlers. His brother was the entrepreneur Dirk Ahlers (died 1937).

After graduating from Friedrichs-Gymnasium in Herford, studying at the technical colleges in Mönchengladbach and Reutlingen and completing a commercial apprenticeship, Jan A. Ahlers began working for his father's company in 1959. After the death of his father in 1968, he took over the management of the family-owned Ahlers textile factory in Herford. He transformed the medium-sized manufacturer of workwear into an international menswear group with the brands Pierre Cardin, Otto Kern, Baldessarini, Gin Tonic, Jupiter, Pioneer Authentic Jeans, Pionier Jeans & Casuals and Pionier Workwear. In 1987, he took the company public as Ahlers AG. He was Chairman of the Management Board until 2002 and then Deputy Chairman of the Supervisory Board until 7 May 2013. From 2005 until the company's insolvency in 2023, his daughter Stella A. Ahlers managed the Group with its 2,200 employees.

== Art collector ==
Ahlers was rejected by an art academy and became a textile merchant. Despite this, he still befriended artists like Gabriele Münter, Bernhard Luginbühl, Dieter Roth, and Daniel Spoerri. Over 35 years, he built a private collection of Expressionism. Ahlers intended to donate it to the MARTa Herford museum, but when the museum focused solely on contemporary art, he withdrew his offer. In 2001, at 66, he sold over 100 works to art dealers Christoph Graf Douglas and David Nash for an estimated 100–120 million German marks. Ahlers used part of the proceeds to purchase works by contemporary artists for his new collection.

== Ahlers Pro Arte Foundation ==
In 1995, Jan A. Ahlers and his daughter Stella (born 1965) established the Ahlers Pro Arte Foundation in Herford. The foundation was based in Hanover from 1995 to 2016. In 2005, the foundation moved to Warmbüchenviertel in Hanover, Warmbüchenstraße 16. The Kestnergesellschaft was based in this historic building from 1948 to 1997. In autumn 2016, the foundation moved into its own building near the company premises in Herford-Elverdissen. The last exhibition in the foundation's old premises took place from 26 February to 26 June 2016 (ZERO The Questioning of Reality).

The foundation aims to document and academically explore the impact of German Expressionist 20th-century art in Germany and abroad. In addition to its own exhibitions, works from the collection will be loaned to venues like the Sprengel Museum Hannover. Stella Ahlers confirmed in April 2016 that the foundation would maintain its connection with the museum through a cooperation agreement.

== Other ==
Ahlers was last married to Kata Légrády (born 1974). He died unexpectedly on New Year's Eve 2013, shortly after his 79th birthday.
