= Elsbach =

Elsbach may refer to:

- Peter Elsbach (born 1924), Dutch physician
- Els (Streu), also called Elsbach, a river of Bavaria, Germany, tributary of the Streu
- Elsbach, a river in central Germany, tributary of the Zorge (river)
- Elsbach (company), a German clothes company
