= Mäurer & Wirtz =

German personal care product manufacturer

Coordinates: 50.761729°N 6.232391°E

Mäurer & Wirtz GmbH & Co. KG
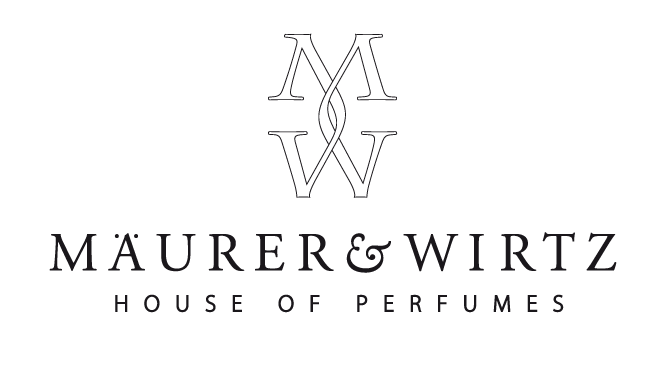
- Type: GmbH & Co. KG
- Industry: Scent and care sectors
- Founded: 1845
- Founder: Michael Mäurer and Andreas August Wirtz
- Headquarters: Stolberg (Rhld.), North Rhine-Westphalia, Germany
- Area served: Worldwide
- Key people: Dr. Hermann Wirtz (CEO), Fabian Krone (CEO)
- Products: Detergents, soap products, perfumes and cosmetics
- Revenue: ▲€158 million (2010)
- Number of employees: 400
- Website: Official website

Mäurer & Wirtz is a German manufacturer of personal care products and perfumes. Since 1990 the company has been a subsidiary of Dalli Group.

The company is managed by the fifth generation of the Wirtz family, joint CEO Hermann Wirtz.

The headquarters and production site is in Stolberg near the city of Aachen with 400 employees. The company sells a range of consumer products using the sales divisions Cosmeurop Perfumes, Théany Cosmetics, NewYorker Cosmetics, s.Oliver Cosmetics and comma Cosmetics. Besides its own brands, such as Betty Barclay and 4711, the company produces licensed brands, such as s.Oliver and Otto Kern.

== History ==
The family business was founded by Michael Mäurer and his stepson Andreas August Wirtz, who established a soapworks in Stolberg in 1845. The company initially produced soft soaps, curd soaps and fine soaps which were sold in a local grocery store. Over time, markets were established in Rhineland, Germany, and in neighbouring countries (mainly France, Belgium, the Netherlands, and Luxembourg). In 1884, the company began producing washing powder. The company's first trademarks were registered at the turn of the century.

In 1939, the company was being run by Hermann Wirtz with the support of his twin brother, Alfred, an engineer. Both brothers were Nazi party members. The company split into three related companies: Mäurer & Wirtz; Chemie Grünenthal, which famously developed and marketed the embryopathic drug Thalidomide; and Dalli-Group.

Mäurer & Wirtz now produces detergents, soap products, perfumes and cosmetics. Since 1992, products under the Betty Barclay brand have been produced under license. In 2007, the company took over the brands 4711 (and produces the brand's flagship 4711 Original Eau de Cologne), Tosca, Sir Irisch Moos and Extase from Procter & Gamble, and in 2011 the Baldessarini fragrance line, and Windsor were acquired.

== Products ==
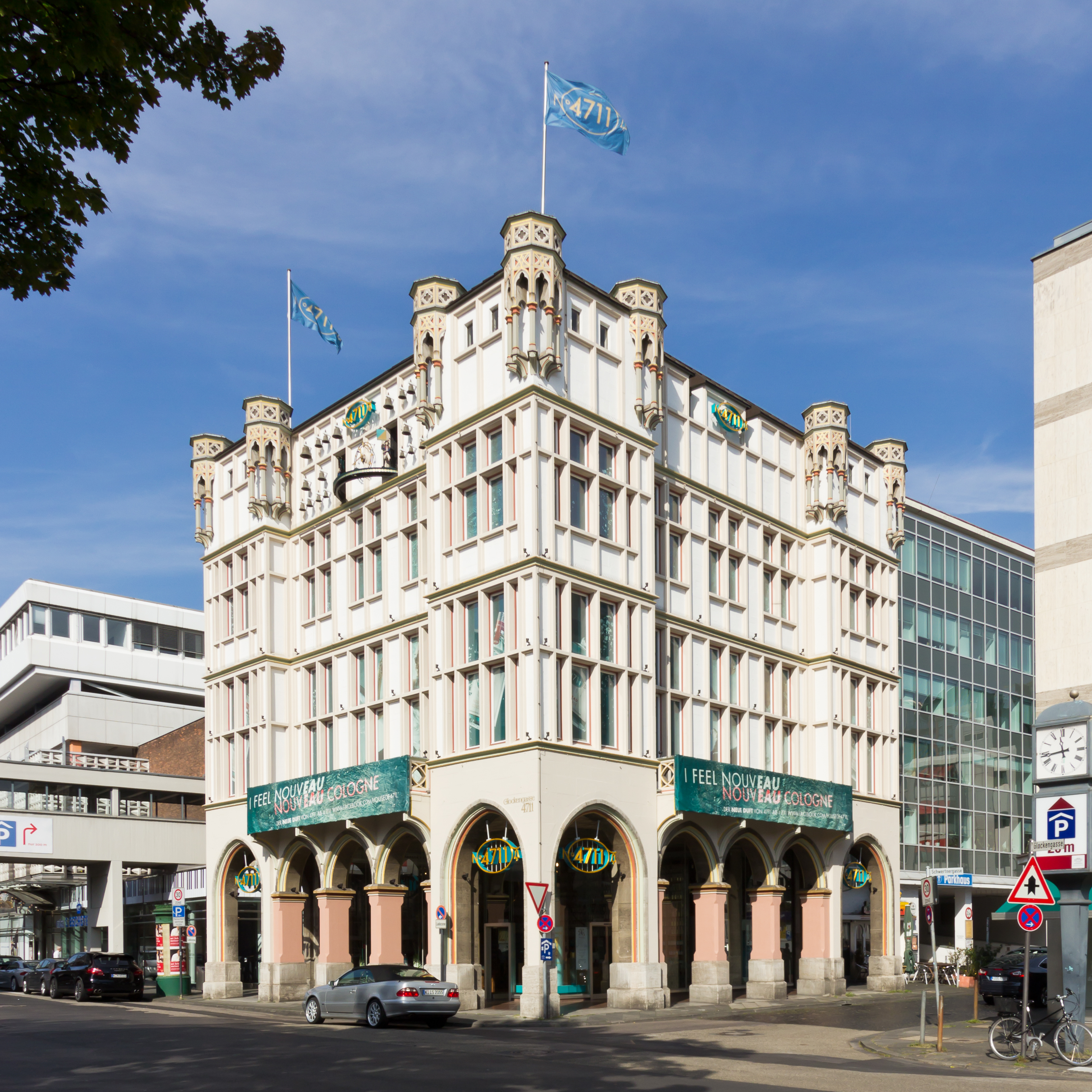
The Glockengasse in Cologne, home of 4711

Mäurer & Wirtz divided its assortment in 2010 into three business units, which will cover different market and user segments: The segment "Beauty" includes own brands and licensed brands from the low-price sector, the pillar "prestige" is in charge for luxury fragrances and under the third segment "4711" the products from the Cologne "Glockengasse" were brought together:

Beauty
- Tabac Original
- Tabac Man
- Tosca
- Sir Irisch Moos
- Nonchalance
- s.Oliver (several products)
- Otto Kern (several products)
- Betty Barclay (several products)
- NewYorker
- Mistral
- comma
Prestige
- Baldessarini (several products)
- Strellson
- Strellson D.STRICT
- Strellson LOADED
- Michalsky
- Michalsky Urban Nomads
- Pussy Deluxe Showcat
4711
- 4711 Original Eau de Cologne
- 4711 Acqua Colonia (several products)
- Nouveau Cologne
