= Tabac (perfume) =

Fragrance created by Mäurer & Wirtz

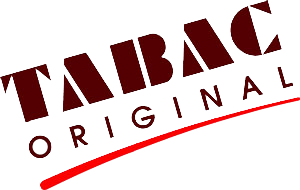
- Product type: Personal care
- Produced by: Mäurer & Wirtz
- Country: Germany
- Introduced: 1959
- Website: www.tabac.de

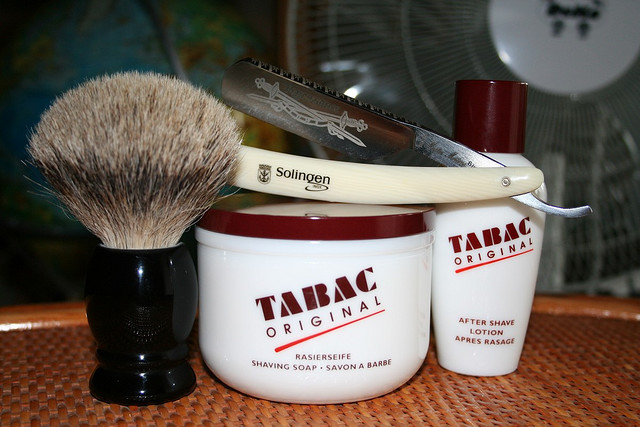
Tabac

Tabac is a brand of fragrance that was created by Mäurer & Wirtz in 1959. It is said to have a floral fragrance and contains a blend of bergamot, neroli, lavender and is accented with tobacco, oakmoss and vanilla. The scent is used in various Tabac branded products, including eau de toilette, eau de cologne, shaving soap, aftershave, and deodorant.

== Trivia ==
In the episode "The Yellow Package" of the 1963 spy series The Fifth Column (television series), a bottle of Tabac can be seen in the main character's bathroom, next to a bottle of Old Spice After Shave.
