= S.Oliver =

German fashion company

s.Oliver
- Type: Public
- Industry: Fashion
- Founded: 1969
- Founder: Bernd Freier
- Headquarters: Rottendorf, Germany
- Area served: Europe (except Eastern Europe (CIS)), India, China
- Products: Apparel; Accessories
- Number of employees: 7,000+ worldwide
- Website: soliver.com

s.Oliver, legally s.Oliver Bernd Freier GmbH & Co. KG, is a German fashion company headquartered in Rottendorf that sells apparel, shoes, accessories, jewellery, fragrances and eyewear worldwide.

== History ==
The company was founded in 1969 by Bernd Freier (who was also its billionaire CEO until 2014) as a small boutique in Würzburg with only 25 square metres of floor space, named Sir Oliver after the hero of Charles Dickens's novel, Oliver Twist. To reflect the spirit of the times, the "Sir" was added to the name in homage to the London fashion scene and to add international flair to the boutique, as the British capital's most successful gentleman's outfitters also featured a "Sir" in their names.

In the 1970s, fashion suppliers were frequently unable to deliver the quantities ordered by retailers or to deliver them on time. In 1974, Bernd Freier decided to travel to India to negotiate directly with local textile manufacturers, thereby gaining independence from the wholesalers. Subsequently, he had his own successful range of "Madras Check shirts" manufactured, which found a ready market in Germany, sold through, amongst others, E. Breuninger GmbH & Co, Uli Knecht, Wöhrl and Wormland. In 1978, following a legal dispute with '4711', the eau de Cologne brand owned by Mäurer & Wirtz GmbH & Co. KG perfume manufacturers, who had registered the name "Sir" as a trademark, "Sir Oliver" was changed to the current brand name, s.Oliver, and registered under that name in 1979 with the German Patent and Trademark Office (DPMA) in Munich.

In 1987, s.Oliver bought out denim fashion manufacturer Chicago and re-launched the brand under the name Knockout.

In 1993, Chaloc GmbH was founded, becoming the well-known comma brand in 2002. comma now operates autonomously and completely independent from s.Oliver. In 1998, the first retail store outside Germany was opened in Austria. Shops in Switzerland, the Netherlands, Belgium and Luxembourg soon followed. Over the next few years, s.Oliver carried on expanding in countries such as the Czech Republic and Poland. s.Oliver developed in this way into one of Germany's—and Europe's—leading fashion companies within a few decades, offering a range of fashion and lifestyle products for all ages.

In 2001, s.Oliver took over the German fashion brand comma. 2008 saw the opening and inauguration of the new s.Oliver headquarters in Rottendorf, including "s.Oliver Mini Club", the company's own day care.

The company currently owns a total of 173 retail stores, as well as running 400 stores in cooperation with partner companies; its products are also sold in 1,991 shops and feature on 2,507 sales floors. Today, s.Oliver is to be found in more than 30 countries, for example in Austria, Switzerland, Slovenia, Belgium, Poland, Bosnia and Herzegovina, Serbia, Croatia, France, Italy, Czech Republic and India. The company has managed to more than quadruple its turnover since 1995, passing a billion euros in 2007. In 2009, the s.Oliver Group generated a brand turnover total of 1.16 billion euros. A once tiny retail store has grown into one of Europe's 20 largest fashion companies. The new head office in Rottendorf was completed in September 2008. s.Oliver celebrated its 40th company anniversary in 2009.

Bernd Freier left the management of the company in November 2019. From 4 November 2019 to December 2022 Claus-Dietrich Lahrs was the CEO of s.Oliver. The current CEO is Jürgen Otto, since December 2022.

== Corporate affairs ==
=== Head office ===
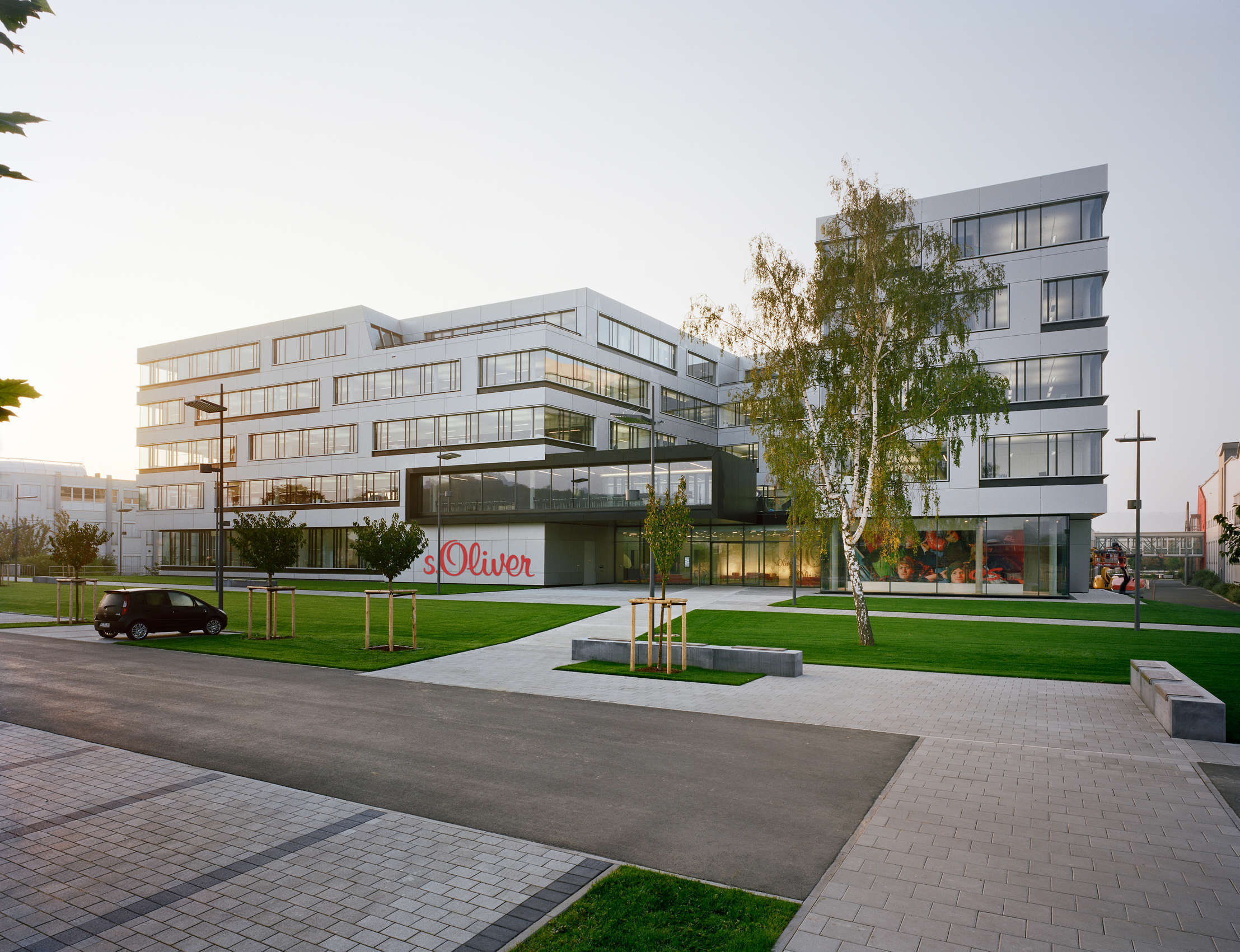
s.Oliver headquarters in Rottendorf

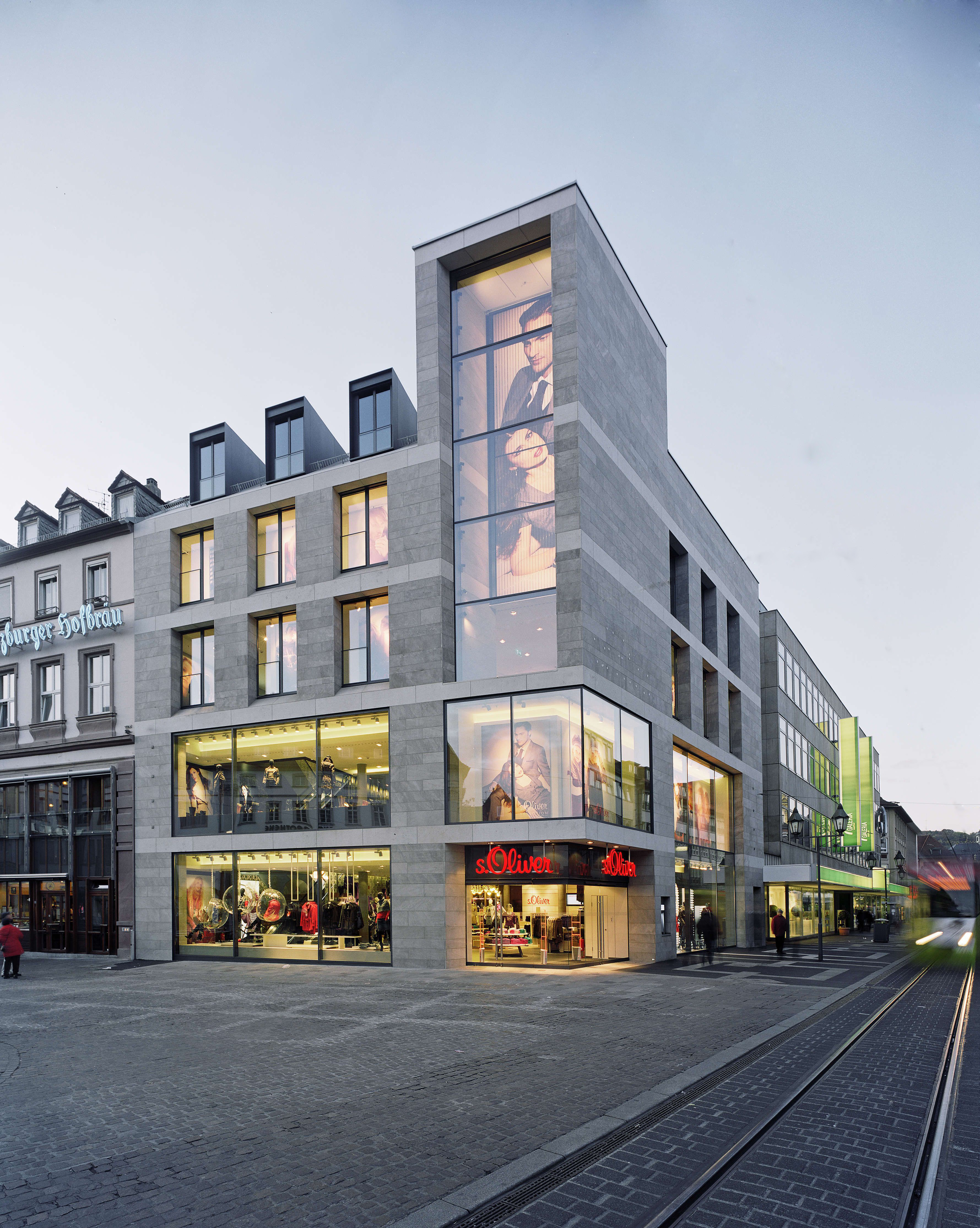
s.Oliver store in Würzburg

The various departments, from design to marketing, from human resources to logistics and distribution, are all located at the company headquarters in Rottendorf, Germany, near the university town of Würzburg. This is where the products, which go on to be manufactured in production facilities in Europe, the Middle East and Asia, are developed by different design teams. On an international level there are s.Oliver purchasing organisations in Hong Kong (China), Hangzhou (China), Chennai (India), Jakarta (Indonesia), Dhaka (Bangladesh) and Istanbul (Turkey). All logistics are centrally managed in Rottendorf. Logistics and warehouse space occupies 70,900 square metres. Up to 400,000 items of clothing are dispatched from here every day to destinations all around the world. More than 2,000 s.Oliver Bernd Freier GmbH & Co. KG staff are employed at the Rottendorf headquarters.

=== Products ===
There are currently three lifestyle segments under the s.Oliver brand, all targeting different buyer types. s.Oliver Casual is the company's largest segment, it focuses on ladies and gents leisure fashion. Trendy and fashionable, QS by s.Oliver is aimed at teenagers and young adults, whereas s.Oliver Selection addresses a more sophisticated audience with a generally understated style. Besides these three main elements, s.Oliver also offers additional product lines like 's.Oliver Bodywear' (lingerie, nightwear, beachwear and homewear for ladies and gentlemen), 's.Oliver Junior' (clothing for newborns, toddlers and children), 'Triangle by s.Oliver' (new segment for sizes from 36 to 54) as well as 's.Oliver Accessories' (bags, belts and leather goods). Through a range of licensed partners, the company also sells 12 licensed lines, including 's.Oliver Shoes', 's.Oliver Eyewear', 's.Oliver Time', 's.Oliver Jewel', 's.Oliver Home', 's.Oliver Fragrances', 's.Oliver Umbrellas', 's.Oliver Garden' and 's.Oliver Baby'.

=== Corporate citizenship ===
s.Oliver is involved in positive corporate citizenship - for example, raising funds for stroke victims, or supporting victims of the terrible floods in South India in 2005. For several years now, one important element of the fashion house's company culture has been its commitment to the Special Olympics Germany. Ever since the event's inauguration back in 1998, s.Oliver has supported athletes, volunteers, and the team that organises the national games.

The company was supplying the specially designed official volunteers' outfits for the 2010 national games in Bremen (Germany), it also supplied the outfits for the whole of the German team attending the World Games. When the earthquake hit Haiti on 12 January 2010, s.Oliver donated from every item sold in the s.Oliver online shop for a week to the victims. The full amount of the donations collected went directly to the victims, without any deductions. s. Oliver is also a sponsor of Würzburg's annual Africa Festival, supporting the fight against Aids in southern Africa. Donations have also been made to the cancer charity "Hilfe im Kampf gegen Krebs e.V." and the "Togo project" of the German leprosy and tuberculosis aid organisation "Deutsche Lepra- und Tuberkulosehilfe" (DAHW). s.Oliver also supported the Germany-based humanitarian aid organisation "Diakonie Katastrophenhilfe"'s efforts for the victims of the cyclone that hit Bangladesh in 2008.

=== Sponsorship and testimonials ===
In the 1990s, the s.Oliver logo featured on the shirts of tennis player Ivan Lendl and Würzburg-born basketball star Dirk Nowitzki. As main sponsor and team outfitters of the German Football Club Borussia Dortmund between 1997 and 2000, the company established a presence outside the fashion world, thereby increasing the level of brand awareness both in Germany and elsewhere.

s.Oliver was also active in motorsport and sponsored Formula One driver Ralf Schumacher during his two seasons at Jordan Grand Prix (1997-1998). The following year, s.Oliver's Knock Out brand became German Formula 3 driver Timo Scheider's main sponsor. His Swiss racing team Bemani Dallara-Opel was Knock Out blue all over; and Timo Scheider even dyed his hair blue.

In 2003, German Pop singer Dieter Bohlen, together with his then-girlfriend Estefania, advertised the 's.Oliver Selection men', because '[...] s.Oliver is a really good brand, they've got cool clothes. In 2006, s.Oliver launched a joint fashion collection with pop singer Anastacia.

2009 saw star violinist David Garrett as the German fashion labels' brand ambassador. In sports sponsorship, s.Oliver has been the main sponsor and outfitter of Polish football club Lech Poznan since March 2010. Since then, the distinctive s.Oliver lettering has been appearing on the stadium on perimeter boards, trainer and players' benches and both goals, the team bus, all the club's relevant printed matter and trainers', assistants' and youth outfits. In 2010, after a run of 17 unsuccessful years, Lech Poznan finally won the national championships again and they can compete in the 2010/2011 season UEFA Champions League 2010/11 qualifiers. s.Oliver Würzburg (basketball, 2010–), FC Bayern Munich (soccer, 2011–2014), Wladimir Klitschko (Boxing, 2014-)
