= Wilhelm Mülhens =

German perfumer (1762-1841)

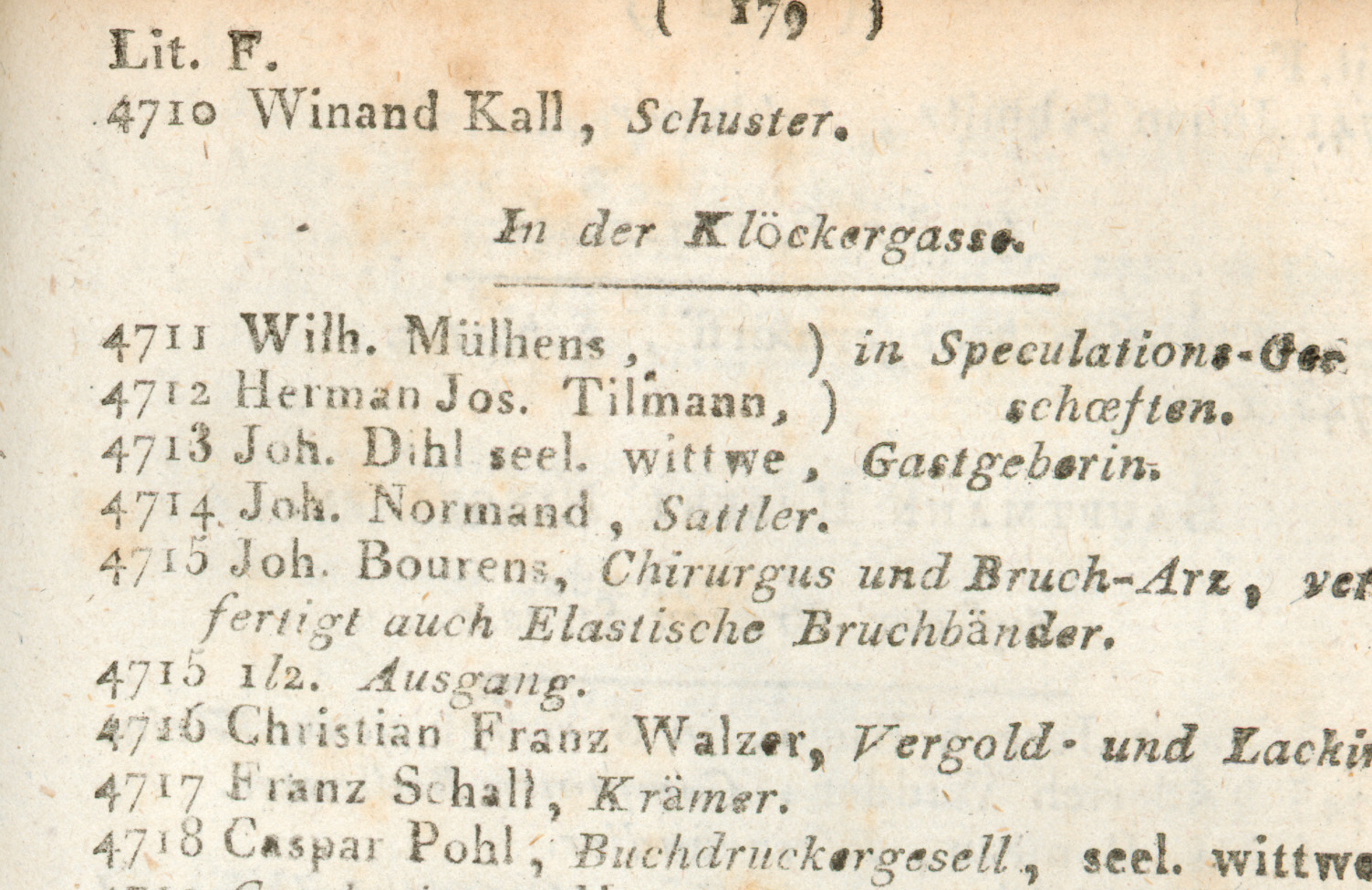
- 3rd Cologne Address Book 1797, Page 179: Wilhelm Mülhens in Klöckergasse
- Born: June 25, 1762; Troisdorf, Germany
- Died: March 6, 1841 (aged 78); Köln, Germany
- Occupations: Businessman, perfumer
- Known for: Founder of the company that made the fragrance 4711

Wilhelm Mülhens (25 June 1762 – 6 March 1841) was a German perfumer and businessman who was the founder of the Mülhens company, known for the fragrance 4711.

== Early life ==
Mühlens was born in Troisdorf, the sixth of eleven children of Jakob Mülhens and his wife Anna, née Volberg. His life prior to 1796 is not well known.

== Work ==
In 1803 Carlo Farina, who was not part of the famous cologne-producing family, fraudulently sold Mülhens that family's naming rights.

In 1805 Mülhens was first recorded as a cologne manufacturer, later sold under the product name 4711 from 1881. After the Napoleonic wars his company also exported the cologne abroad, including Paris and Stralsund.

== Legal case ==
In 1832 Mülhens was found guilty of abusing the name "Farina", and the 1803 contract was found to be void. To continue operating under the name "Farina" in 1832 Mühlens's son, Peter Joseph Mülhens, took on a Farina from Mortara as a partner in the company for "office work and supervision of fabrication."

== Death ==
Mülhens died in Köln on the 6 March 1841.

== Gallery ==
Documents related to Wilhelm Mülhens
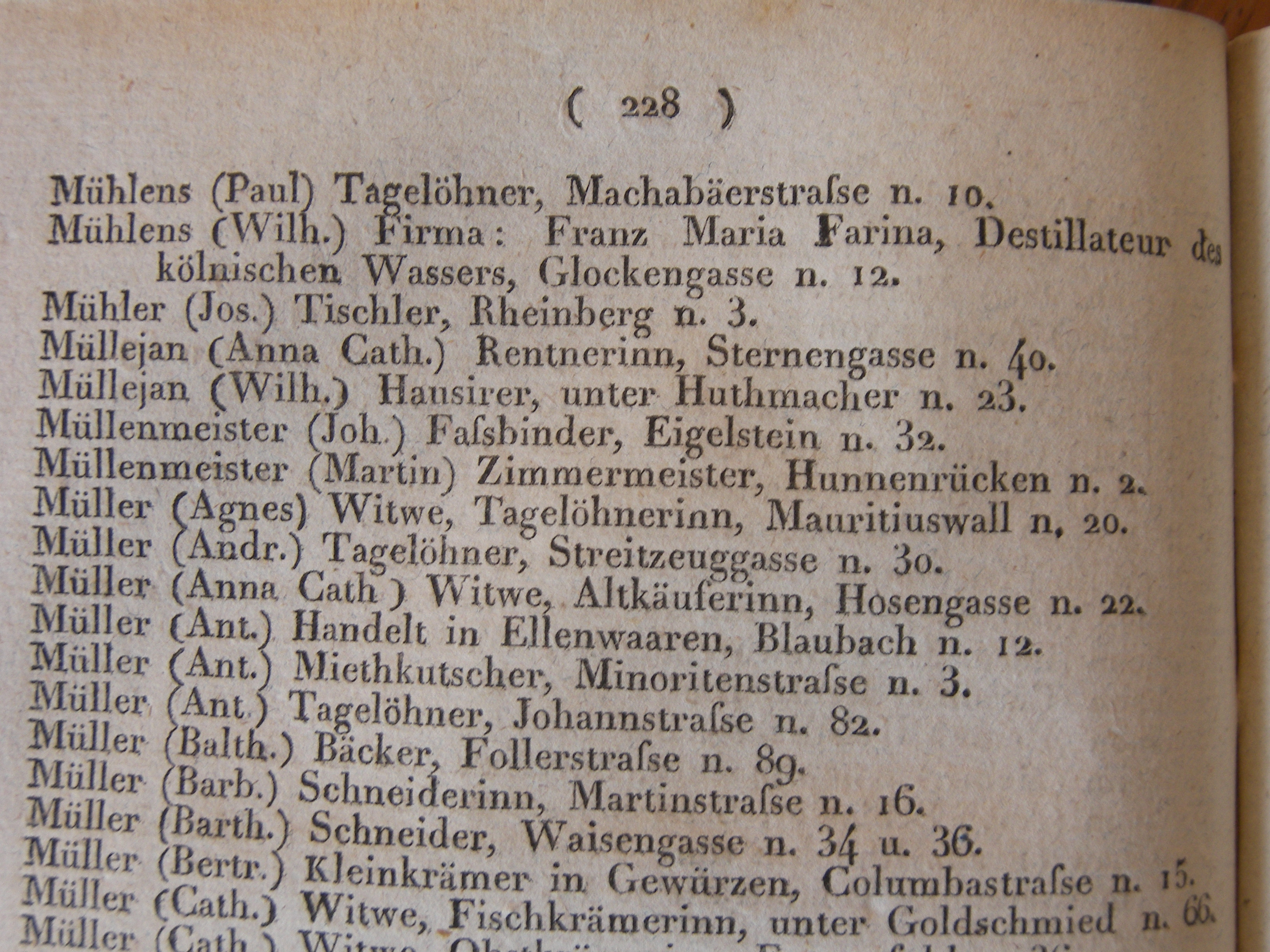
5th Cologne Address Book 1822, Page 228: Wilhelm Mülhens (Mühlens) listed under the company Franz Maria Farina

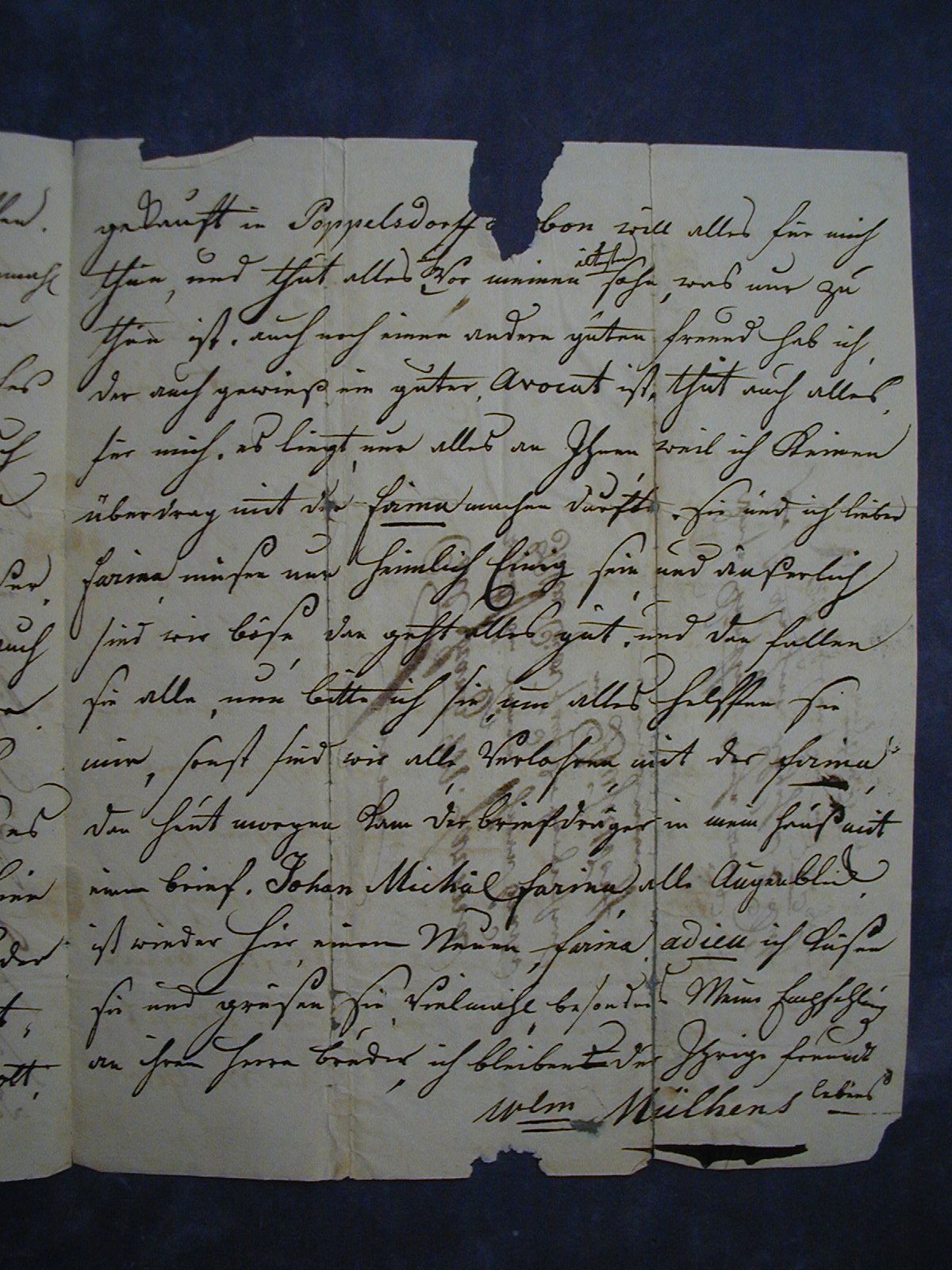
Letter from Wilhelm Mülhens on 3 February 1826

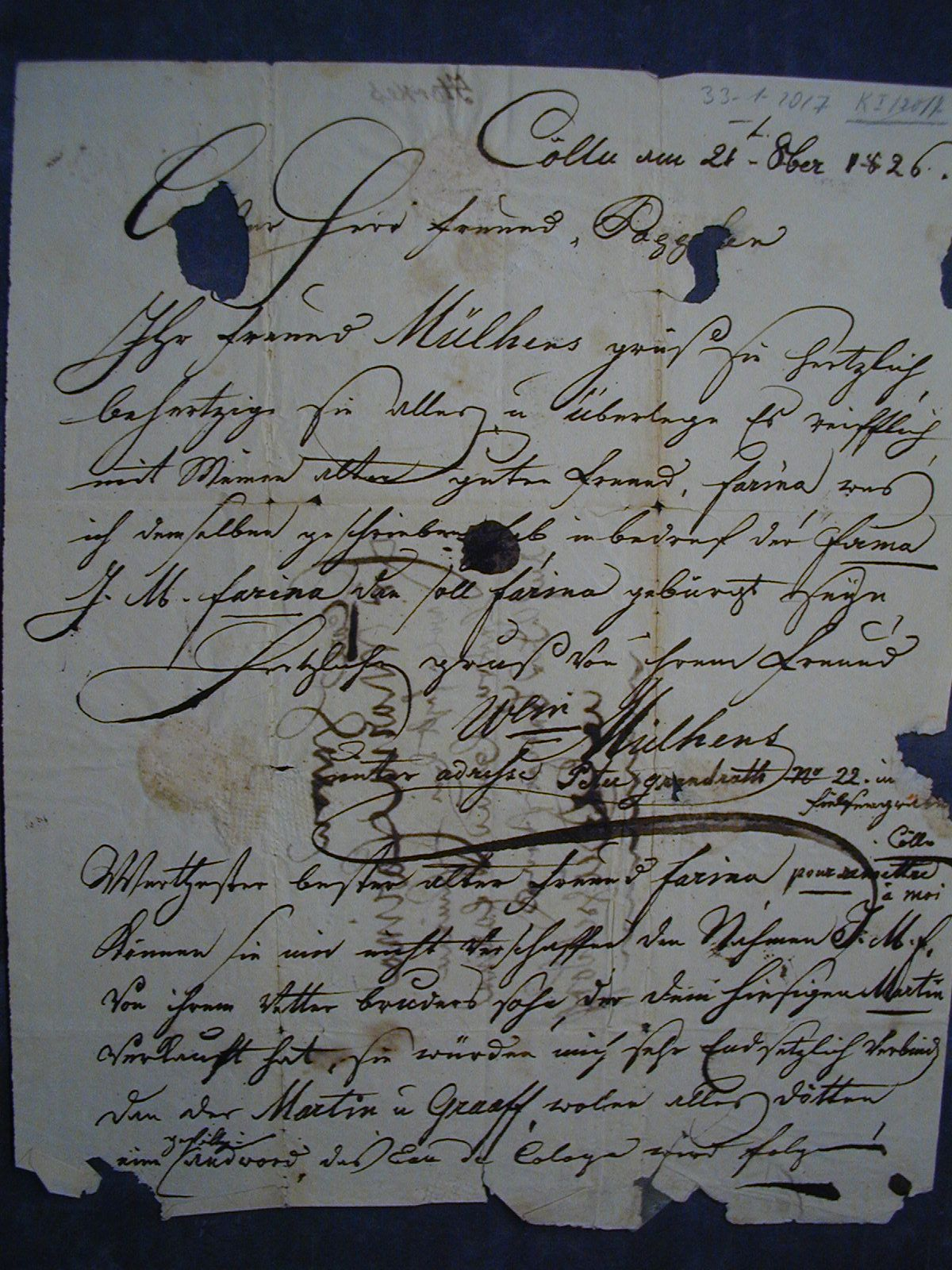
Letter from Wilhelm Mülhens on 21 October 1826

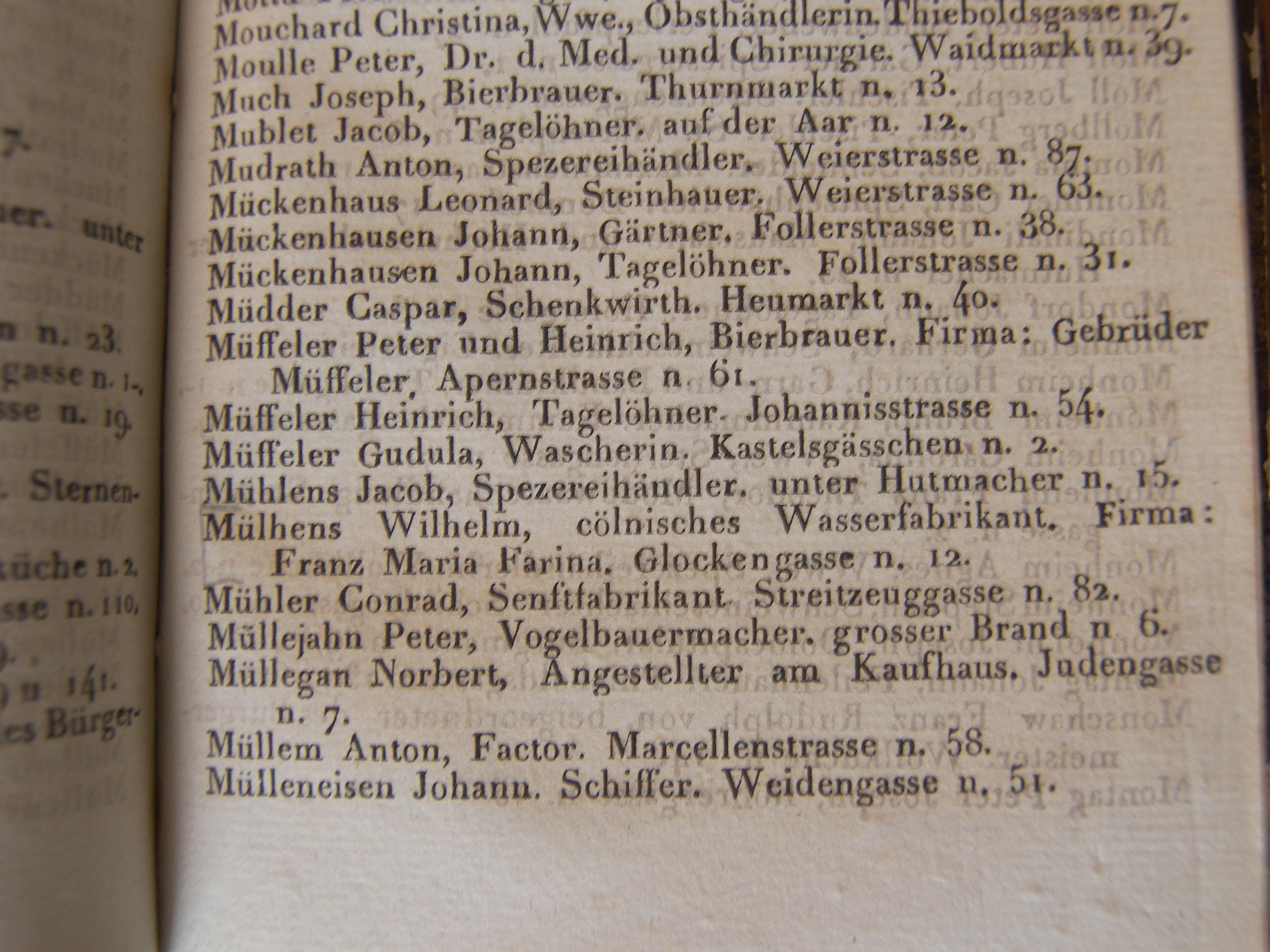
7th Cologne Address Book 1831, Page 261: Wilhelm Mülhens Glockengasse No.12
