= 4711 =

German cologne

Coordinates: 50°56′18″N 6°57′08″E

4711 Eau de Cologne

4711 is a traditional German Eau de Cologne by Mäurer & Wirtz. Because it has been produced in Cologne since at least 1799, it is allowed to use the geographical indication Original Eau de Cologne. The brand has been expanded to various other perfumes and products besides the original Echt Kölnisch Wasser, which has used the same formula for more than 200 years.

The original 4711 store at Glockengasse 4 in Cologne is a popular tourist attraction.

== History ==
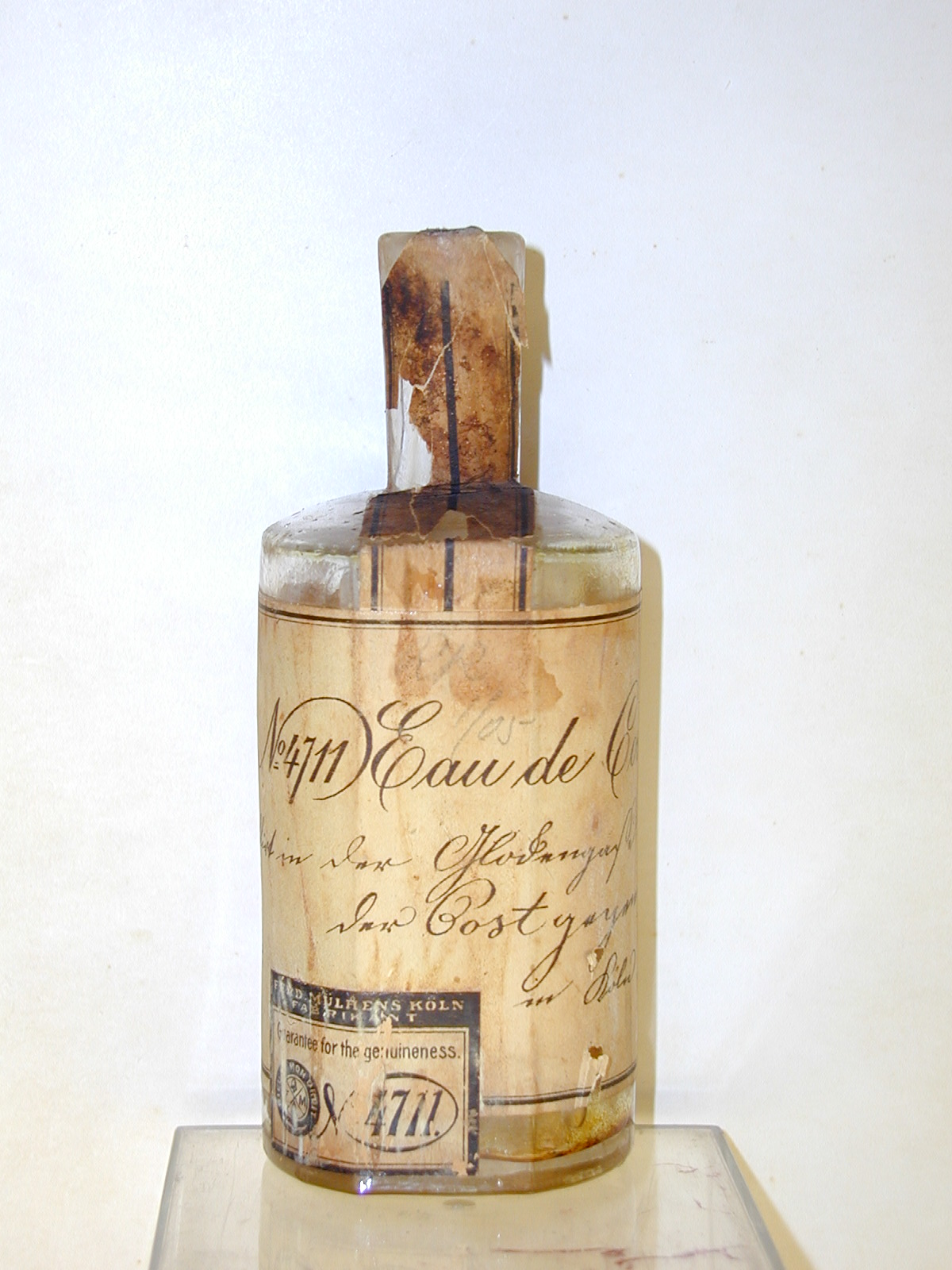
An original 4711 bottle from 1885

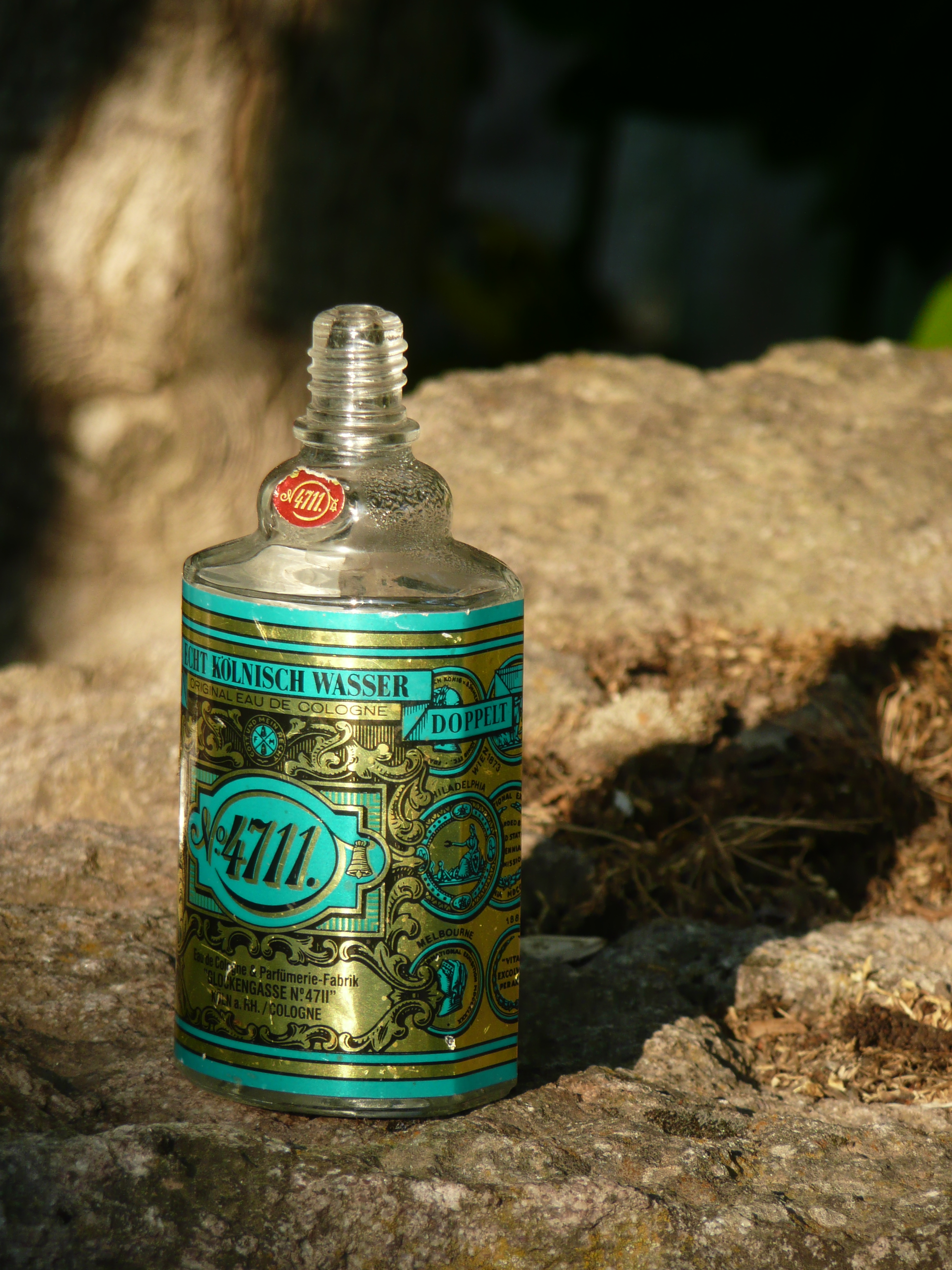
Today's flacon: the so-called "Molanus bottle"

In the early 18th century, Johann Maria Farina (1685–1766), an Italian living in Cologne, Germany, created a fragrance. He named it Eau de Cologne ("water from Cologne") after his new home. Over the next century, the fragrance became increasingly popular.

According to legend, on 8 October 1792, a Carthusian monk made a wedding gift for the merchant Wilhelm Mülhens (1762–1841): the secret recipe of a so-called "aqua mirabilis", a "miracle water" for internal and external use. Mülhens then founded a small factory at Cologne's "Glockengasse" and established the first "Eau de Cologne" as a remedy.

Peter Joseph Mülhens and his son Wilhelm Mülhens had been in a dispute over the use of the name "Farina" from 1800 to 1881. The Farina family accused Mülhens of using the name without authorization. The firm "Johann Maria Farina gegenüber dem Jülichs-Platz" feared confusion between the products because they also produced perfumes. In 1832, Wilhelm Mülhens lost the dispute, whereupon he employed another Mr. Farina from Mortara in order to continue using the name.

During World War II Nazi Germany's Kriegsmarine (navy) issued vast amounts of 4711 perfume to the submariners of the U-boat fleet. As there were limited facilities and few opportunities for bathing, the scent was to be used in an attempt to improve the odour aboard the vessel. Crew members typically didn't use much of it and would take home bottles as presents for mothers, wives or girlfriends.

The company name was Eau de Cologne & Parfümerie Fabrik Glockengasse No. 4711 gegenüber der Pferdepost von Ferd. Mülhens in Köln am Rhein until 1990, when it was renamed Mülhens GmbH & Co. KG.

In 1994, the Mülhens family company was bought by Wella AG, Darmstadt, Germany. Since 1997, Wella has operated its cosmetic activities under the name Cosmopolitan Cosmetics GmbH, although the name Mülhens GmbH & Co. KG was still in use. In 2003, Wella AG was taken over by the American competitor Procter & Gamble.

In summer 2006, Procter & Gamble announced it would sell the 4711 brand and three other former Mühlens brands, as part of an effort to divest "local" brands and to focus on global brands. The offer attracted several interested parties; in December 2006, P&G announced that the brand had been sold to the perfume company Mäurer & Wirtz in Aachen, a subsidiary of the Dalli Group. In 2006, 4711 had the second highest market share in Germany right behind Chanel.

== House number 4711 ==
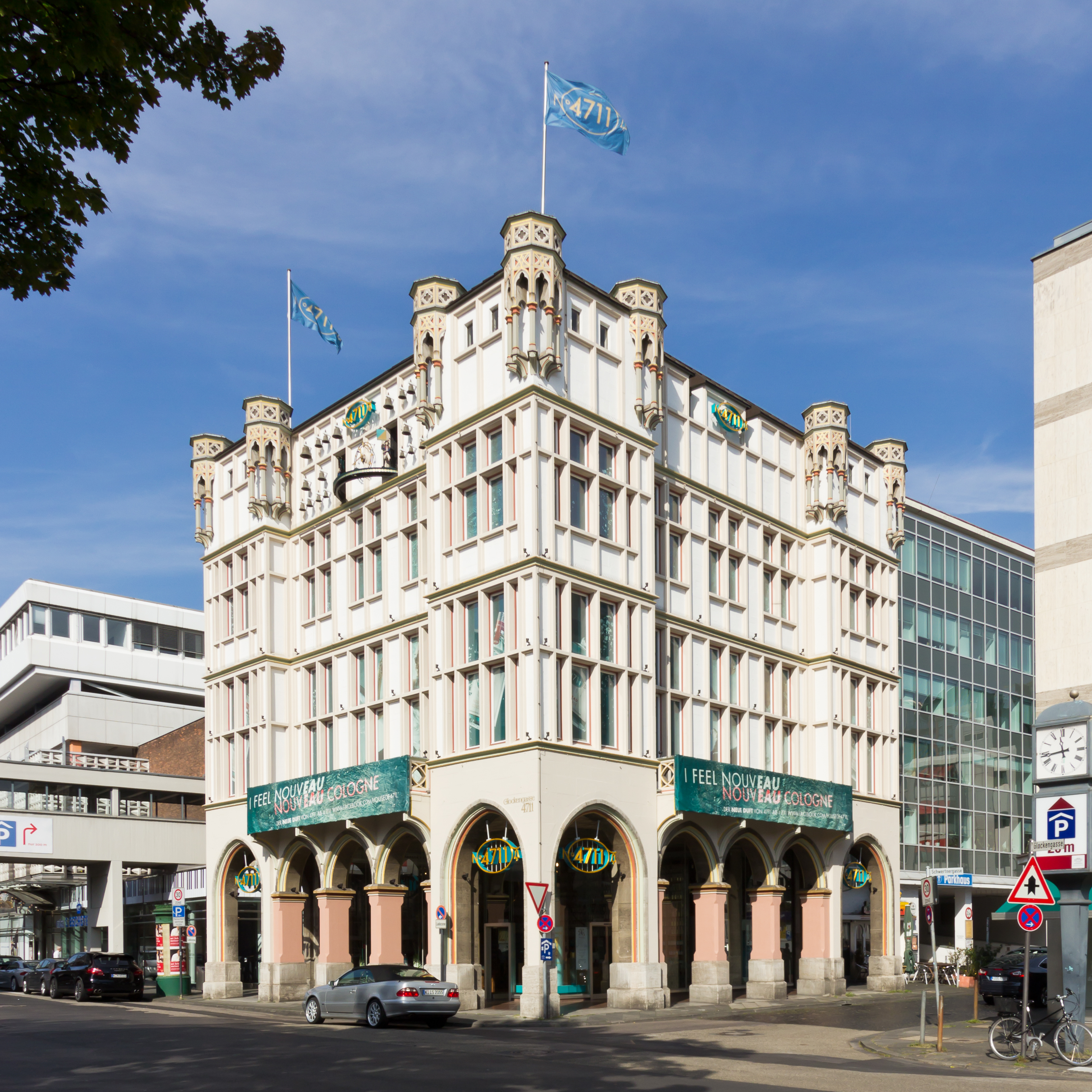
Glockengasse 4 in Cologne, the headquarters of 4711

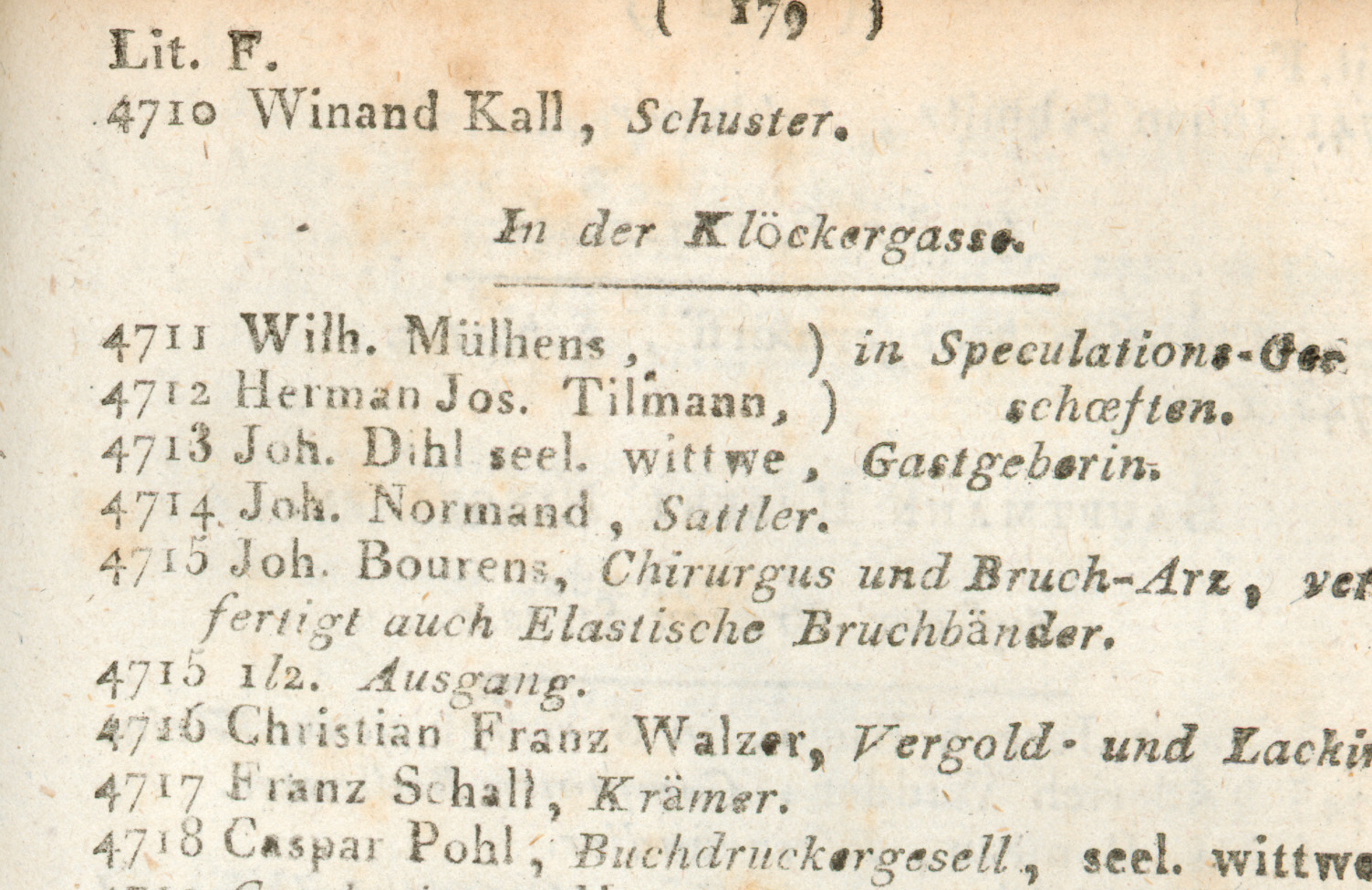
Third address book of Cologne, 1797, page 179

On 3 October 1794, in view of the French troops standing just outside Cologne, the city council approved a plan proposed by the guard-committee to number all houses in the city without exception and to install what would be considered appropriate lighting for each location. Orders were given to install the lighting immediately, while the numbering was left to fate.

On 6 October 1794, French troops occupied the city. On 7 October 1794, the city council decided that every local government official had to hand in an inventory of all citizens and non-citizens in his district within 48 hours. Furthermore, the guard-committee received authorisation to number the houses as previously agreed.

On 20 October 1794, Senator Gottfried von Gall noted in his diary that the numbering and the written documentation of the houses which started eight days earlier was being continued.

The printer Heinrich Josef Metternich (a council member) applied for permission to publish an address calendar. This calendar was supposed to include, amongst other things, the house numbers which had recently been assigned. He also sought permission to collect all the relevant details.

In the second address book of Cologne (1797), the widow of Wilhelm von Lemmen was still listed as the tenant of the Klöckergasse house, which had been given the number 4711.

Wilhelm Mülhens was listed as the tenant of the house no sooner than in the third edition of the address book of Cologne; his occupation was listed as "in Speculationsgeschäften" (which translates to speculator). He is not yet listed under the manufacturers of Eau de Cologne in the mercantile directory.

In 1811, the continuous house numbering was changed to a system of numbering streets separately, as is common today.

In the preface to the 1813 French edition of the address book, the publisher Thiriart claimed that there had not been any house numbering before the arrival of the French in the city ("inconnu à Cologne avant l´arrivée des armées françaises au bord du Rhin") and that the order to number the houses had been given in 1795.

In 1854, Peter Joseph Mülhens moved from Glockengasse 12 into a newly constructed commercial building with a neo-gothic facade at Glockengasse 26-28. Glockengasse 12, which had been assigned the number 4711 in 1794, remained vacant for a period of time and was torn down after it was sold.

The depiction of a French military officer painting the house number 4711 on the facade of the house in the Glockengasse while sitting on his horse is a product of advertising. A piece of tapestry, a gobelin which had been ordered and made in the 1920s, served as a model. A scenic version spread widely in the 1950s and the 1960s.

== In popular culture ==
In Yevgeny Zamyatin's novel We, the name S-4711 is a reference to the Eau de Cologne.

In the novella Breakfast at Tiffany's by Truman Capote, the famed lead character Holly Golightly uses 4711.

In the film The Rocky Horror Picture Show, Dr. Frank N. Furter has '4711' tattooed on his thigh.

Due to the cologne's usage as a surrogate alcohol, 4711 was the original telephone number of the Finnish Poison Information Centre. Currently, the number directs to the branch exchange of Helsinki University Hospital.

In the 1991 Persian drama film Mother, directed by Ali Hatami, Mohammad Ibrahim (played by Mohammad Ali Keshavarz), mockingly says about his mentally disabled brother Gholamreza (played by Akbar Abdi): "Not that he is so fragrant as 4711, he is sitting in front of the wind at the window!" This line means that: "even though his body is not so fragrant, he is sitting in front of the wind so that the wind will carry his scent everywhere!" (a Persian proverb).

Australian band Ammonia named one their songs from their 1998 album Eleventh Avenue "4711" after the Eau de Cologne.

In the 2000 fantasy novel, Harry Potter and the Goblet of Fire, the character Rubeas Hagrid uses some while he is trying to woo the French headmistress of Beauxbatons Academy, Madame Maxime.

Thomas Pynchon's 2013 novel Bleeding Edge references 4711. Two of the novel's characters, one of whom is hyperosmic, discuss the cologne's history.
