= Adolf Ahlers AG =

German clothing company

Ahlers AG
- ISIN: DE0005009740
- Website: ahlers-ag.com

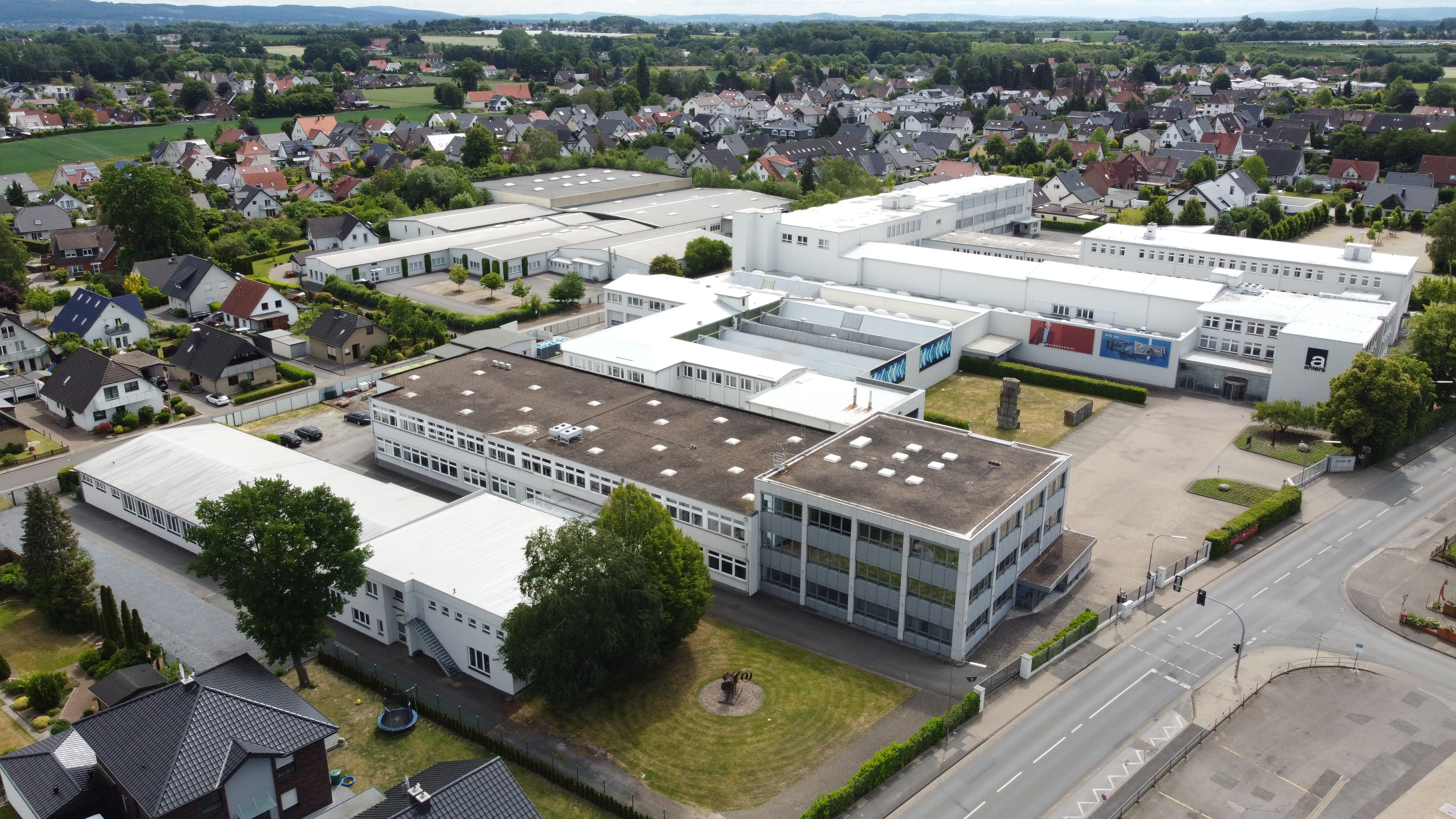
Ahlers in Herford-Elverdissen

Ahlers AG was a listed manufacturer of men's fashion. The company was headquartered in Herford-Elverdissen.

== History ==
Historisches Logo

Ahlers was founded in 1919 by Adolf Ahlers in Jever as a cloth wholesaler. After moving to Oldenburg i.O. in 1925, a production plant was opened in Herford-Elverdissen in 1932 and the headquarters were relocated there.

=== Nazi era ===
An underwear factory was built in Herford in 1936. During the period of "Aryanization" in 1938, Adolf Ahlers took over the operations of Elsbach in Herford, the largest textile company in Europe at the time. The Jewish Elsbach family was forced to sell the shares in their company to Ahlers for far less than they were worth. The former managing director, Kurt Elsbach, sought refuge from the Nazis abroad. The company was renamed "Herforder Wäschefabriken AG" by Ahlers.

=== Postwar ===
The former managing director Kurt Elsbach, who had fled abroad, returned to the company in 1947, but died in 1954. From 1952, the company was again called "Elsbach Wäschefabriken AG". The shares were returned to the Elsbach family. Ahlers remained a shareholder, acquired the entire company in 1964 and converted it into a limited liability company. Jan A. Ahlers, son of the company founder, took over the management from his father Adolf Ahlers in 1968 and expanded the company into an internationally active group. In 1979, the company's own production facility was relocated to Sri Lanka. In 1987, Jan A. Ahlers floated the company on the stock exchange. Stella A. Ahlers, the founder's granddaughter, has managed the company since 2005.

=== Bankruptcy and takeover ===
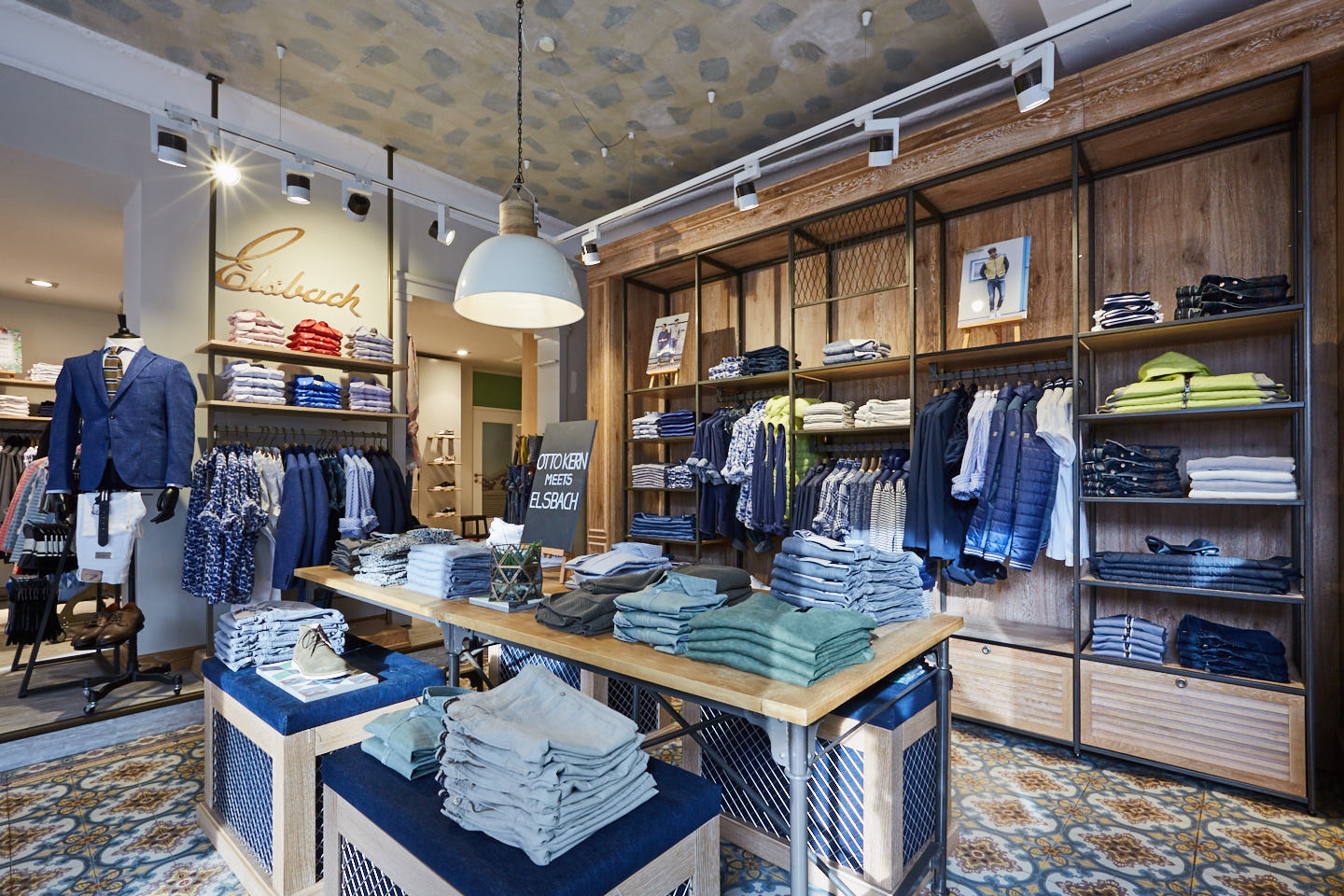
Elsbach Denim Library Norderney

In April 2023, Ahlers AG filed for insolvency proceedings for itself and some of its subsidiaries. In mid-June, the Röther Group announced that it would take over the Pierre Cardin, Baldessarini, Pioneer Jeans and Pionier workwear brands and that around 300 jobs would be lost. Röther closed all Ahlers stores and the brands' online stores. The management subsequently announced that the brands would be bundled and continued in a new holding company called R. Brand Group within Röther. The takeover was completed in August 2023.

In 2024, the European Commission handed a total fine of 5.7 million euros ($6 million) to Ahlers and Pierre Cardin for breaching EU antitrust rules, arguing that the companies between 2008 and 2011 had anticompetitive agreements to shield Ahlers from competition in European countries where it held a Pierre Cardin license.

== Brands ==
Ahlers sold clothing from five brands for different target groups and price segments. The company held licenses for these brands and owned the other brands:

- Baldessarini (2006 gekauft vom Hugo-Boss-Konzern)
- Pierre Cardin (Lizenz seit 1992)
- Pioneer Authentic Jeans (Eigenmarke seit 1970)
- Otto Kern (Marke ab 2000 schrittweise gekauft, seit 2011 zu 100%)
- Pionier Workwear Berufskleidung (Eigenmarke seit 1971)

=== Former brands ===
- Jupiter (1987 gekauft, 2018 Aufgabe der Sportswear-Marke)
- Jupiter Shirt (Ausgliederung 2010 in ein Joint Venture, Anteil 49%)
- Eterna Mode (1996 gekauft, 2006 für 120 Mio. Euro an den Frankfurter Finanzinvestor Alpha Private Equity verkauft)
- Gin Tonic (1999 gekauft, Aufgabe der Freizeitmarke Ende 2015)

== Distribution ==
At the end of November 2021, Ahlers operated a total of 115 retail stores, 23 of which were operated by the company itself. Partners operated a total of 92 stores as of November 30, 2021, mainly in Eastern Europe. The Pierre Cardin and Baldessarini brands are also sold via the company's own online stores.

== Sources ==
- Hauptversammlung 2017 im eBundesanzeiger
