= Eau de Cologne =

Type of perfume

Eau de Cologne (French: [o d(ə) kɔlɔɲ]; German: Kölnisch Wasser [kœlnɪʃ vɐsɐ]; meaning "Water from Cologne") or simply cologne is a perfume originating in Cologne, Germany. Originally mixed by Johann Maria Farina (Giovanni Maria Farina) in 1709, it has since come to be a generic term for scented formulations in a typical concentration of 2–5% and also more depending upon its type of essential oils or a blend of extracts, alcohol, and water. In a base of dilute ethanol (70–90%), eau de cologne contains a mixture of citrus oils, including oils of lemon, orange, tangerine, clementine, bergamot, lime, grapefruit, blood orange, bitter orange, and neroli. It can also contain oils of lavender, rosemary, thyme, oregano, petitgrain (orange leaf), jasmine, olive, oleaster, and tobacco.

In contemporary American English usage, the term "cologne" has become a generic term for perfumes marketed toward men. It also may signify a less concentrated, more affordable version of a popular perfume.

== History ==
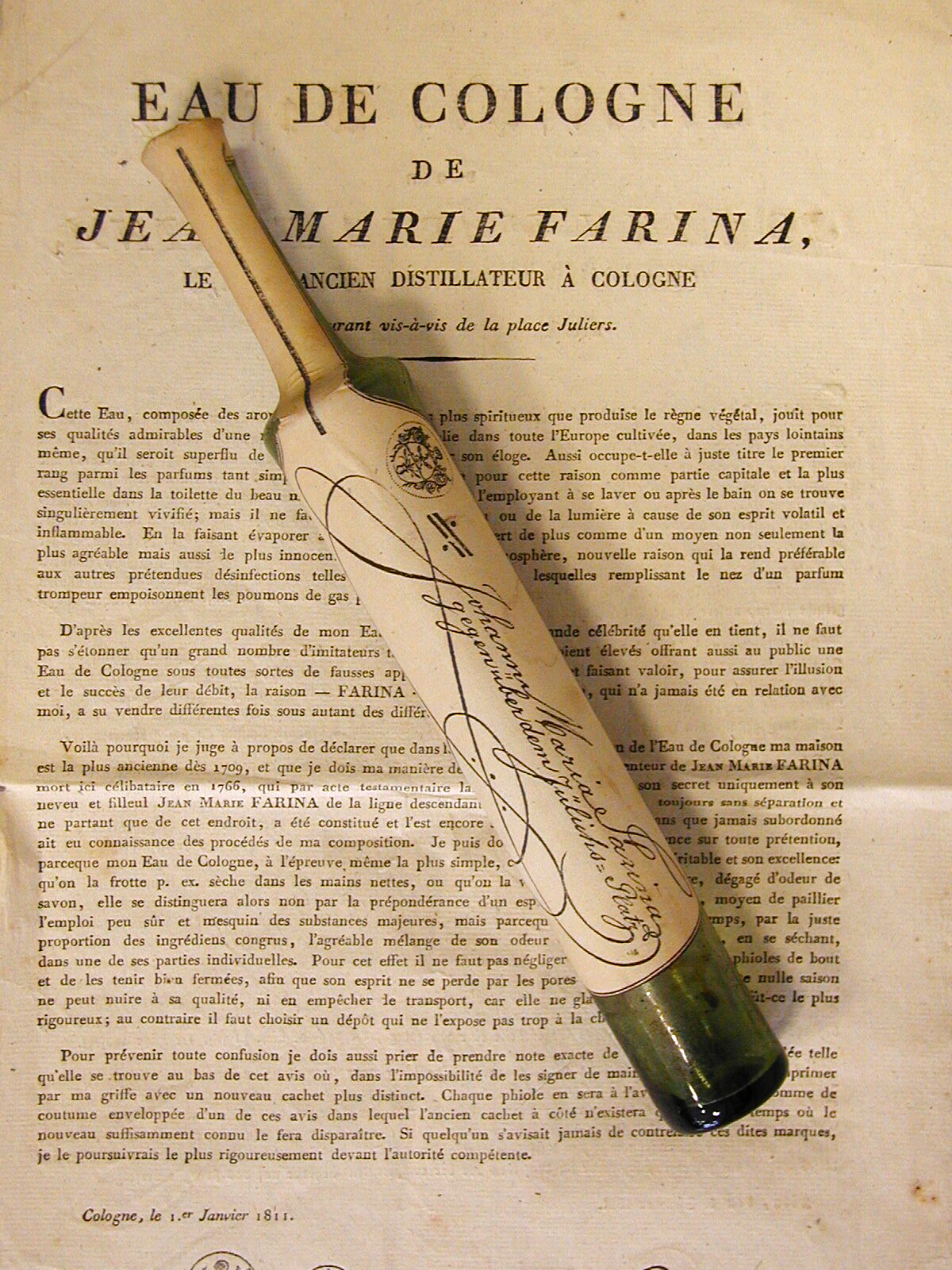
An eau de cologne by Farina (1811)

Colognes were created to mask odors and show a sense of luxury.^{[1]} Early colognes were used to scent the air using oils that were burned, releasing a pleasant scent throughout a room. Cologne was first invented in Germany in 1709 and gained great popularity as a refreshingly light alternative to the stronger scents produced in France, who had remained the center of perfumery for many years previously. Introduced as eau de cologne, fragrances for men started to become more popular.

The earliest evidence of perfume making was during the Bronze Age, circa 4000 BCE. Archaeologists uncovered an industrial-size factory. Even the Bible, in the book of Exodus, describes the use of perfume as an exclusive fragrance for priests. This perfume was derived from cinnamon, cassia, myrrh, and sugar cane.^{[2]} The first known individual perfume maker was a Tapputi, a Mesopotamian chemist. She used solvents to extract scents sometime around 1200 BCE. The Hindus of the Indus civilization in greater India also had a documented history of perfume during the period of 3300 BCE to 1300 BCE. They created a fragrance based on essential oils called ittar. Varahamihira wrote about the use of perfumes for members of the royal household and their harems in his book the Brihat-Samhita. Archaeologists later found terracotta jars that were used to store perfumes.

The word cologne has evolved over time, but it still refers to fragrant water that is light and refreshing. Over the years, the term has been used broadly to describe a range of scents, not just those from Cologne, Germany. However, the name still carries a sense of heritage, as it connects back to the birthplace of this iconic fragrance.

In addition to its role as a personal fragrance, Eau de Cologne has historically been used for a variety of practical and cultural purposes beyond perfumery. In the 18th and 19th centuries, it was commonly applied as a refreshing body splash, a linen spray, and even as a mild antiseptic due to its high alcohol content. It was also believed to have therapeutic benefits, with users applying it to the temples or wrists to alleviate headaches, fatigue, or stress. During periods when bathing was less frequent, its light citrus scent made it a popular hygienic aid across Europe. Today, while these uses are less common, Eau de Cologne continues to be associated with cleanliness and revitalization, influencing the development of modern body sprays, aftershaves, and wellness-oriented fragrances.

The original Eau de Cologne is a spirit-citrus perfume launched in Cologne in 1709 by Giovanni Maria Farina (1685–1766), an Italian perfume maker from Santa Maria Maggiore, Valle Vigezzo. In 1708, Farina wrote to his brother Jean Baptiste: "I have found a fragrance that reminds me of an Italian spring morning, of mountain daffodils and orange blossoms after the rain". He named his fragrance Eau de Cologne, in honour of his new hometown.

The Eau de Cologne created by Farina was used only as a perfume and delivered to "nearly all royal houses in Europe". His ability to produce a constantly homogeneous fragrance consisting of dozens of single-origin essences was seen as a sensation at the time. A single vial of this aqua mirabilis (Latin for miracle water) cost half the annual salary of a civil servant. When free trade was established in Cologne by the French in 1797, the success of Eau de Cologne prompted countless other businessmen to sell their own fragrances under the name of Eau de Cologne. Giovanni Maria Farina's formula has been produced in Cologne since 1709 by Farina opposite the Jülichplatz and to this day remains a secret. His shop at Obenmarspforten opened in 1709 and is the world's oldest fragrance factory.

Another famous scent, the Original Eau de Cologne 4711, is named after its location at Cologne's Glockengasse No. 4711. It was developed by Wilhelm Mülhens and produced in Cologne since at least 1799, and is therefore probably one of the oldest fragrances still produced in the world. On 12 December 2006, the perfumes and cosmetics company Mäurer & Wirtz took over 4711 from Procter & Gamble and has expanded it to a whole brand since then.

In 1806, Jean Marie Joseph Farina, a great-grandnephew of Giovanni Maria Farina, opened a perfumery business in Paris that was later sold to Roger & Gallet. That company now owns the rights to Eau de Cologne extra vieille, in contrast to the Original Eau de Cologne. Eau de Cologne was once believed to protect against bubonic plague: by drinking the cologne, the citrus oil scent would exude through the pores, repelling fleas. Many flea shampoos for dogs are based on citrus oils today.

In modern times, eau de Cologne or "cologne" has become a generic term. The term "cologne" can be applied to perfume for men or women, but in American English, usage typically refers to perfumes marketed toward men.

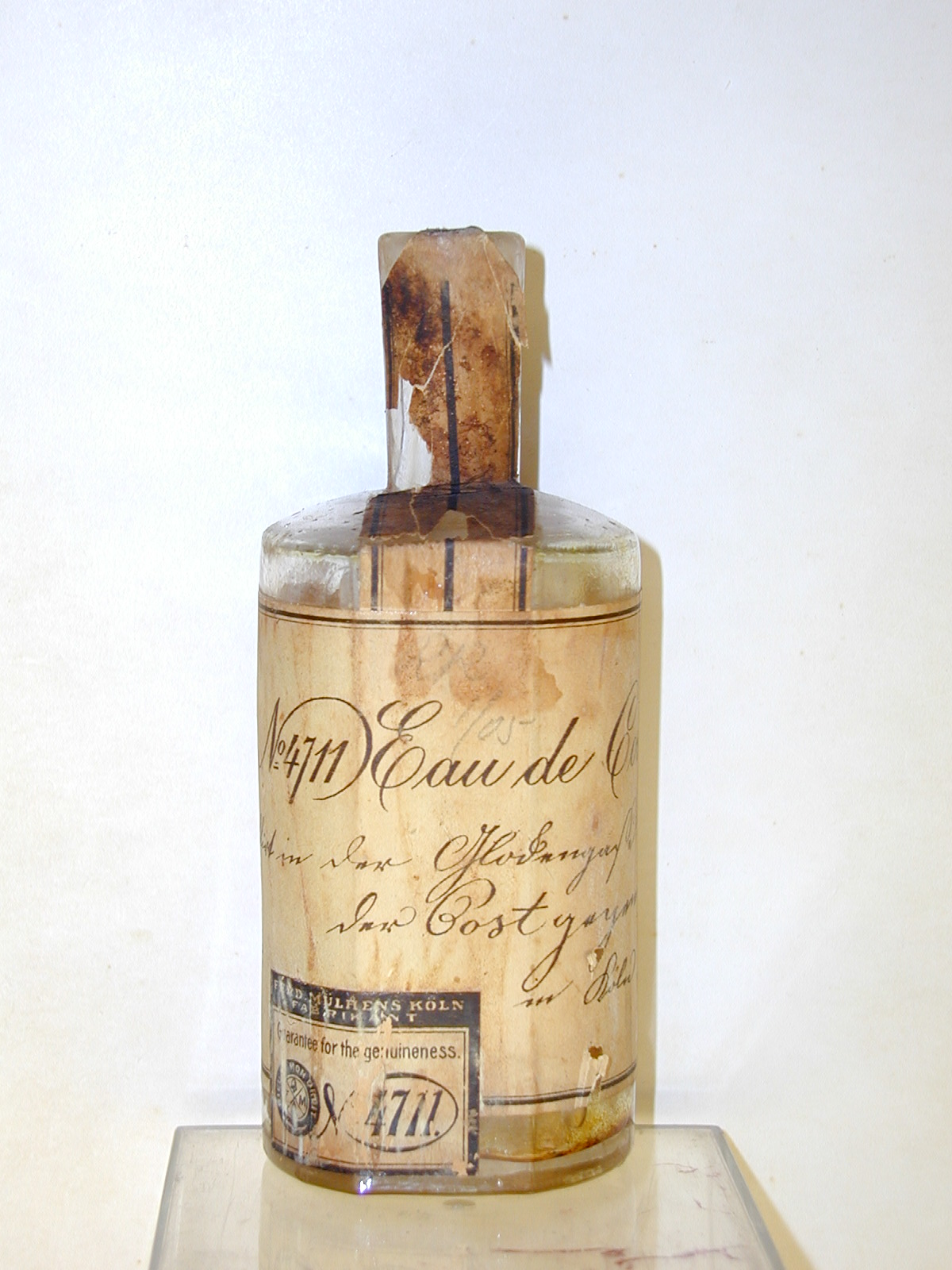
4711 (1885)

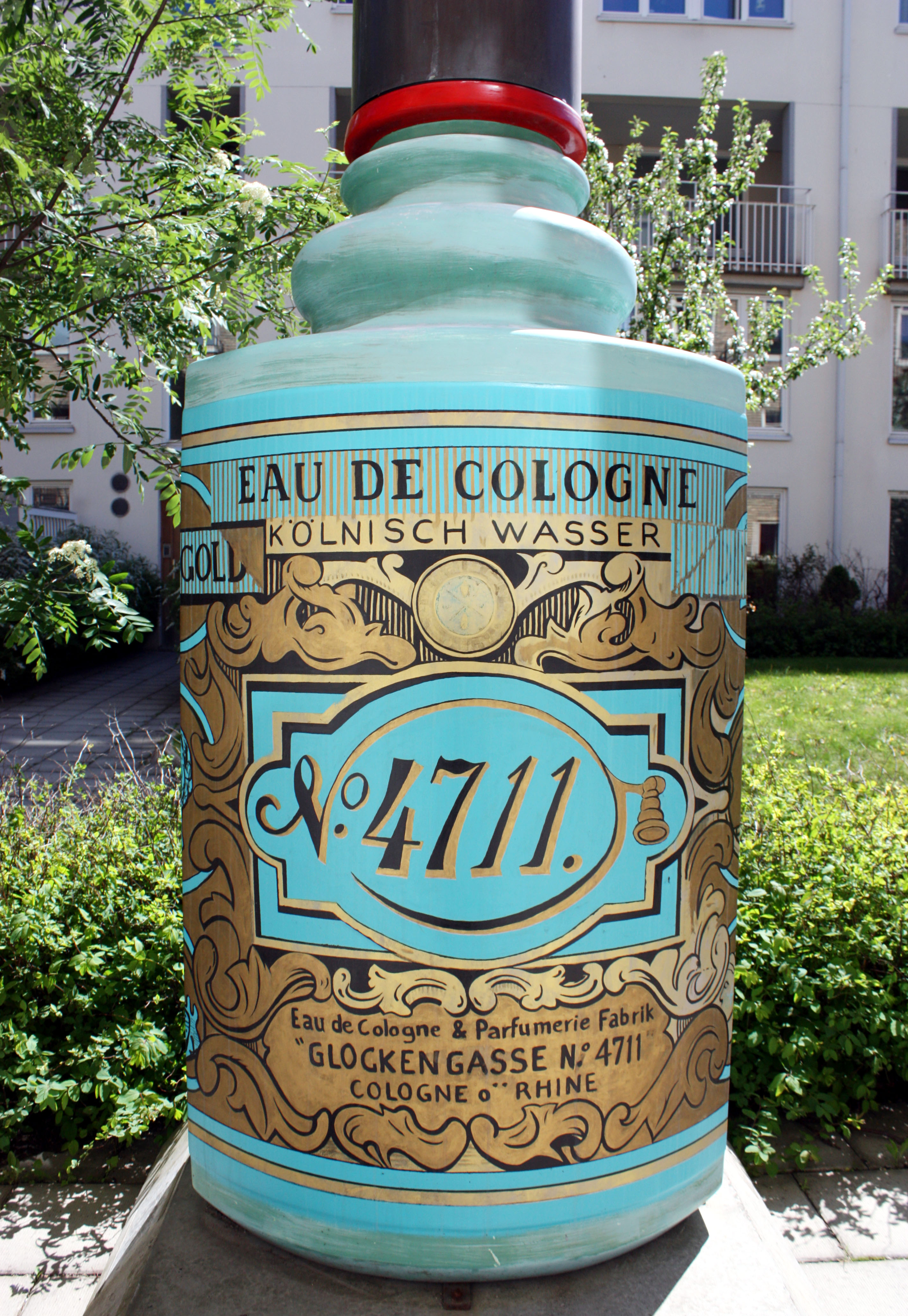
4711

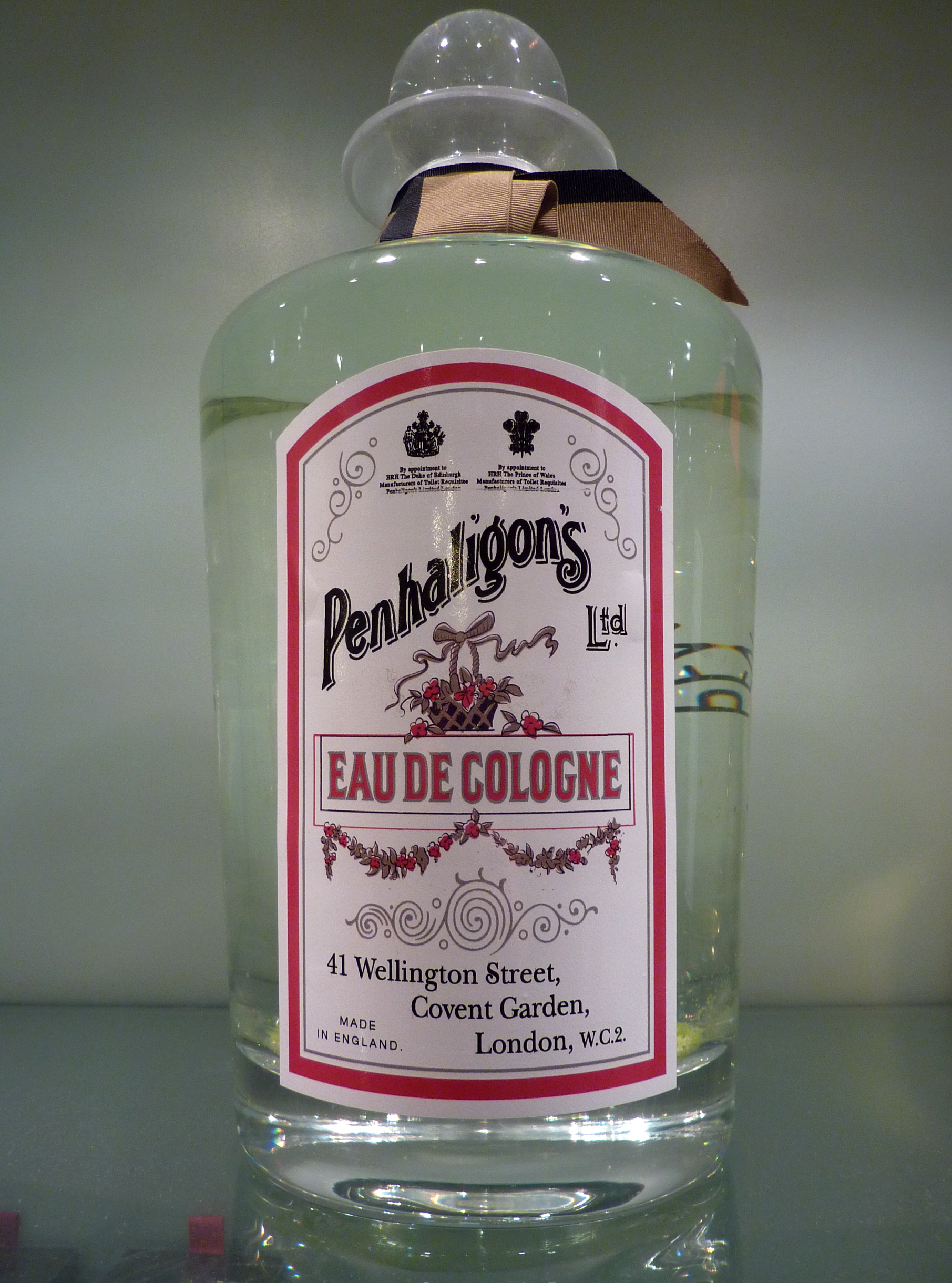
Penhaligon's

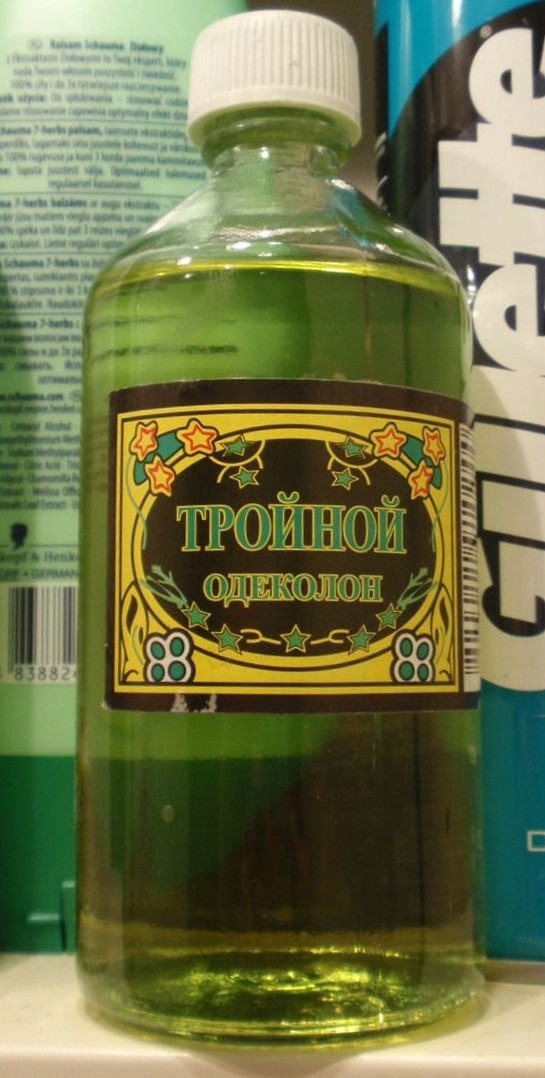
Troinoj (1889)

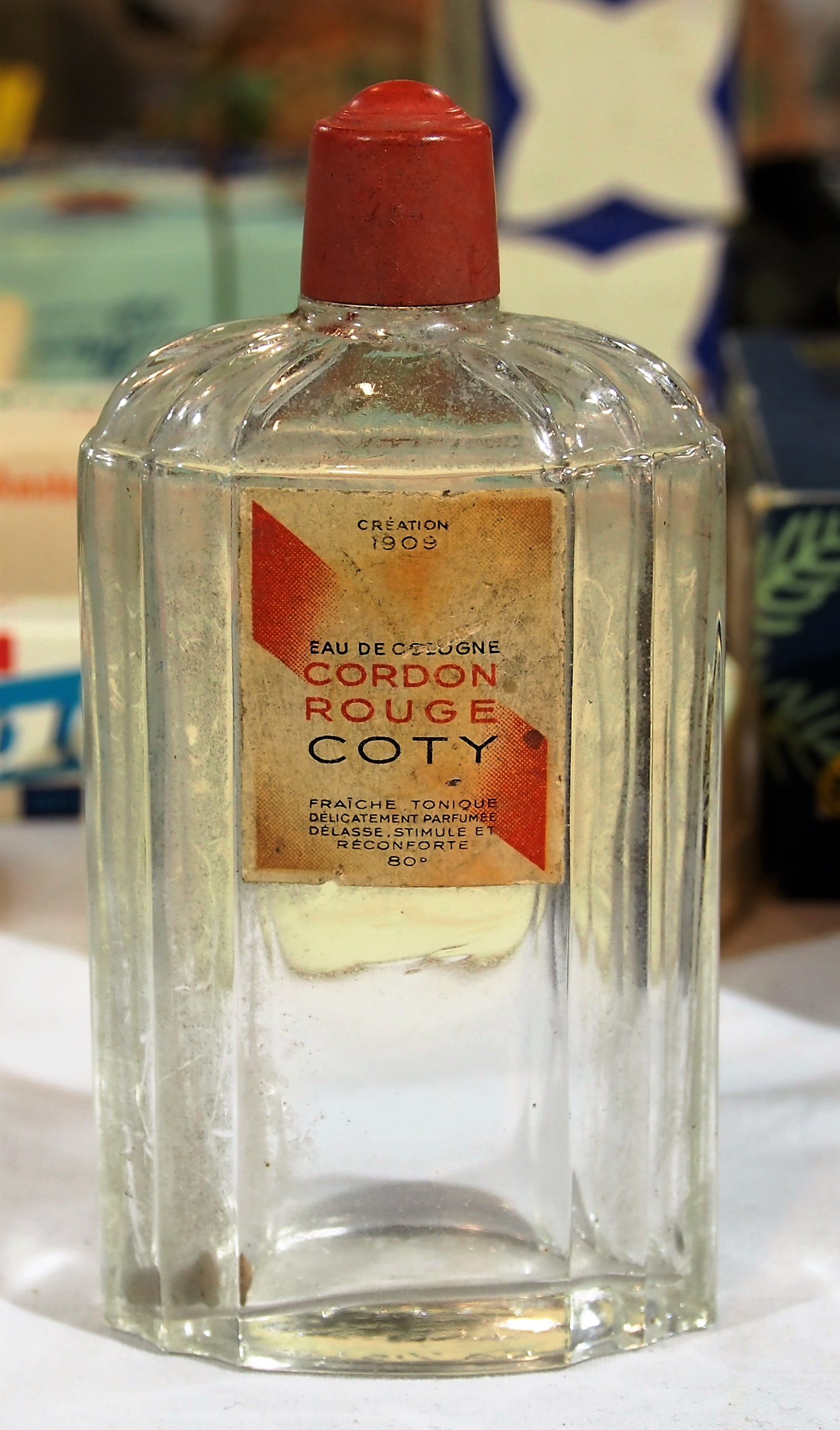
Cordon Rouge, François Coty (1909)

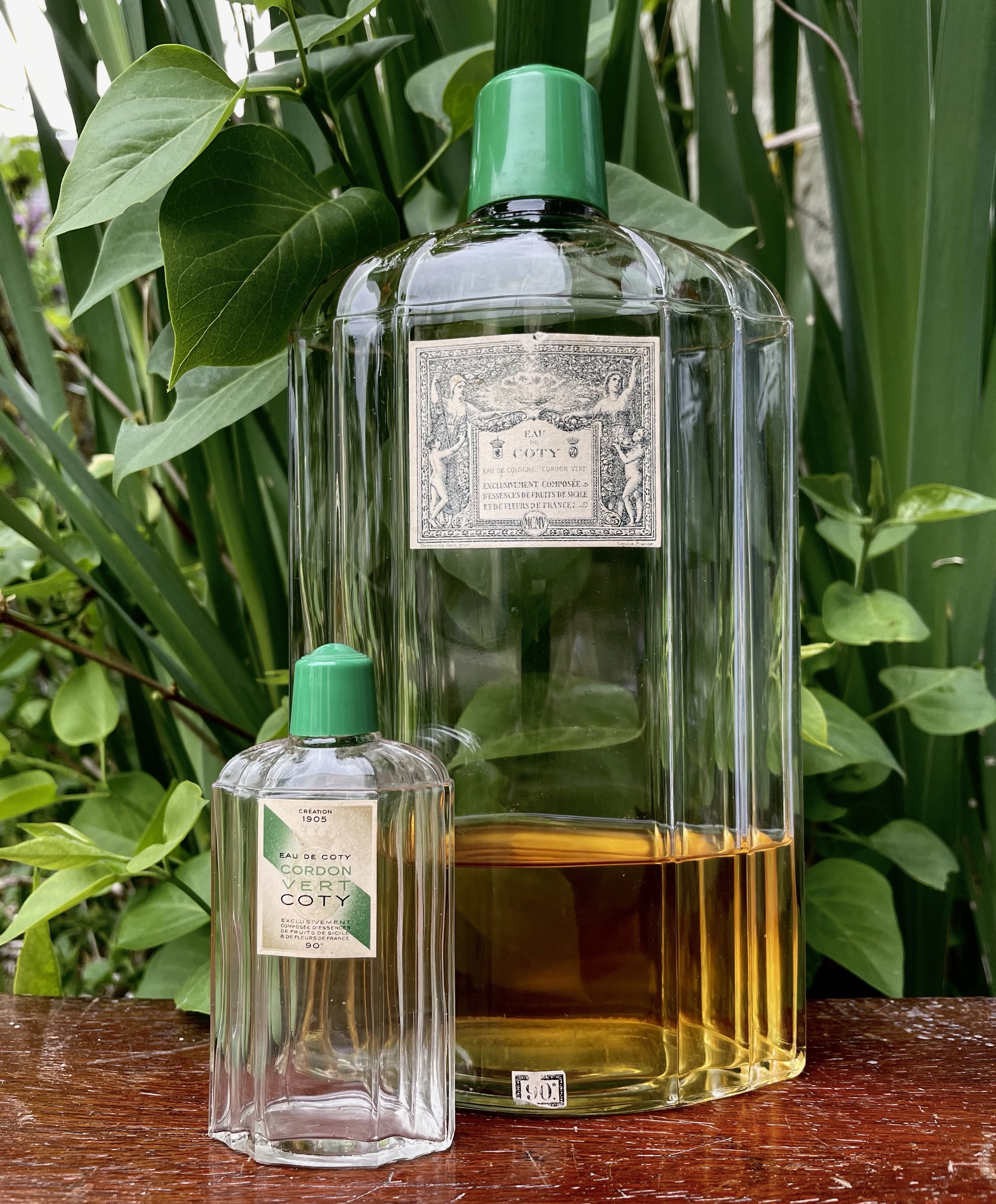
Cordon Vert, François Coty (1905)

=== Cologne in Turkish culture ===
After the fame of the cologne became widespread, Farina's cologne was brought to the Ottoman Empire during the reign of Abdülhamid II. It was common to offer rose water to guests in the Ottoman Empire at that time, but the tradition of offering cologne began after it became popular there. In 1882, the first local cologne was produced in the Ottoman Empire by Ahmet Faruk, popularly called odikolon. After the collapse of the Ottoman Empire, the use of cologne became a widespread culture. Currently, most Turkish hosts offer cologne to their houseguests at each visit.

== Literary references ==
Yevgeny Yevtushenko's poem "About Drinking" describes the author coming back from a whaling voyage and arriving at a small town where the local store is out of liquor and, as a substitute, they use a case of Eau de Cologne to drink.

== See also ==
- Aftershave
- Deodorant

== Bibliography ==
- Fenaroli, Giovanni; Maggesi, L. (1960). "Acqua di Colonia". Rivista italiana essenze, profumi, piante offizinali, olii vegetali, saponi (in Italian). 42.
- La Face, Francesco (1960). "Le materie prime per l'acqua di colonia". Relazione al Congresso di Sta. Maria Maggiore (in Italian).
- Monk, Paul M. S. (May 2004). Physical Chemistry: Understanding Our Chemical World. Wiley. ISBN 978-0-471-49181-1.
- Sabetay, Sébastien (1960). Les Eaux de Cologne Parfumée. Sta. Maria Maggiore Symposium (in French).
- Wells, Frederick V. (1960). Variations on the Eau de Cologne Theme. Sta. Maria Maggiore Symposium.
- Wells, Frederick V.; Billot, Marcel (1981). Perfumery Technology. Art, science, industry. Chichester: Horwood Books. pp. 25, 278. ISBN 0-85312-301-2.
- Wilhelm, Jürgen, ed. (2005). Das große Köln-Lexikon (in German). Cologne: Greven Verlag. ISBN 3-7743-0355-X.
