= Elsbach (company) =

Former textile industry company from Herford, North Rhine-Westphalia, Germany

- Industry: textile and clothing industry

Elsbach was a textile industry company that existed from 1873 until the 1990s in the East Westphalian town of Herford in North Rhine-Westphalia. Before the First World War, it was considered the largest European underwear factory.

== History ==
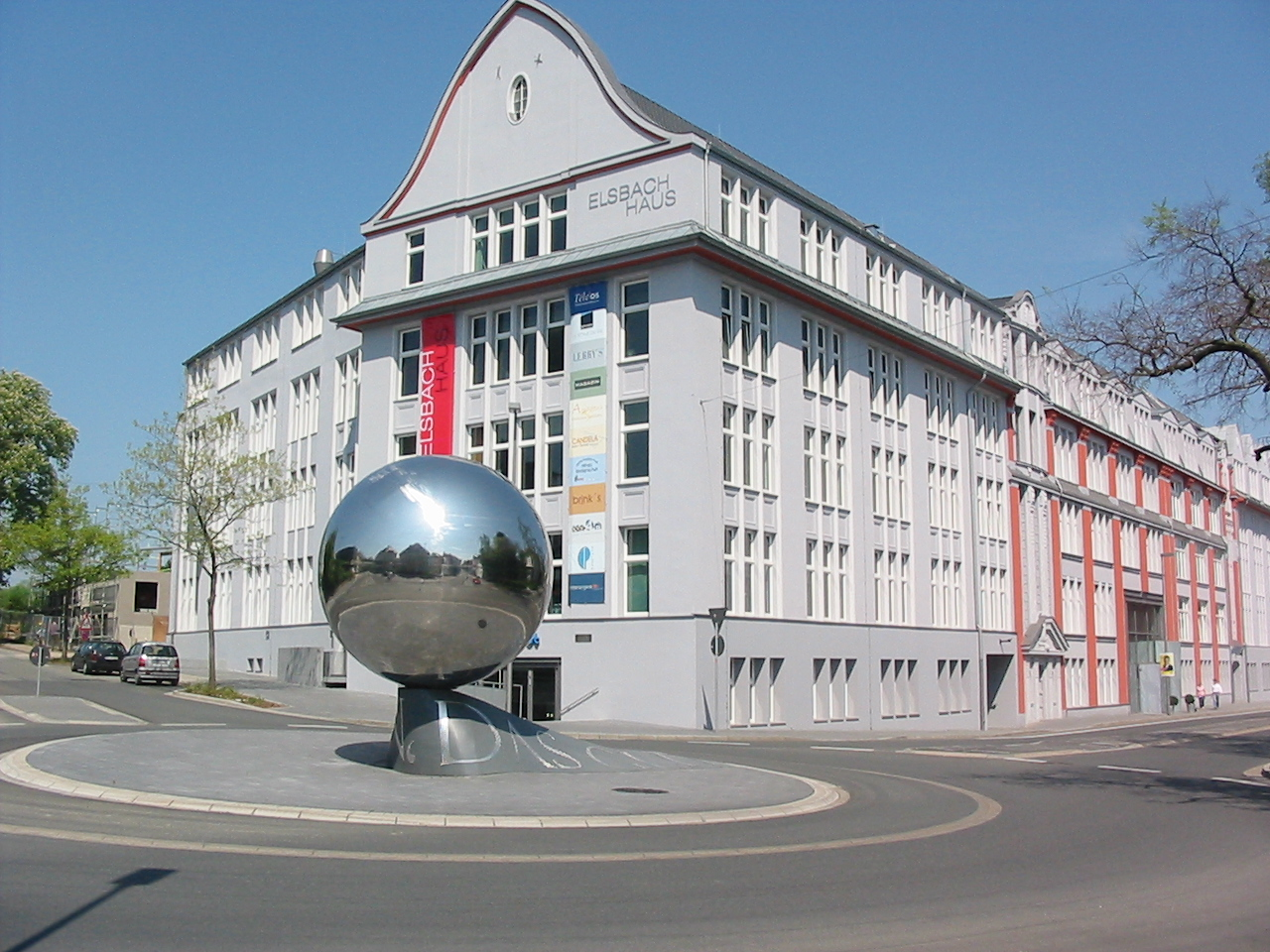
The Elsbachhaus, built in 1909

The brothers Josef and Hermann Elsbach (1846-1926) founded the company in 1873 on Brüderstraße in Herford, which was entered in the commercial register in 1875 as Herforder Hemdenfabrik J. Elsbach & Co. The founders came from a Jewish family that had been running a linen business since 1848.

In 1891, the company's headquarters were moved to Goebenstrasse, where the Elsbachhaus was built in several construction phases from 1909. From 1907, Elsbach was a public limited company. In 1914, the company was the largest underwear factory on the European continent (excluding Great Britain). More than 1200 factory workers and several thousand home workers were employed. Branches were established in Löhne, Lage and Bielefeld. In 1922, 123 employees, 1067 factory workers and 1481 home workers worked for Elsbach. After the period of inflation, the number of employees declined.

== Nazi-era persecution and loss ==
When the Nazis came to power in Germany in 1933, the Elsbach family was persecuted because of their Jewish heritage. Due to antisemitic racial laws, they had to sell their shares in 1938 as part of the Aryanization process. The company was taken over by Ahlers and renamed Herforder Wäschefabriken AG. At the end of the Second World War, the factory buildings were severely damaged by fire and looting.

== Postwar ==
After the war, the military government of the British occupation zone confiscated Ahlers' share package. The former managing director Kurt Elsbach, the son of Hermann Elsbach, who had fled abroad, returned to the company in 1947, but died in 1954. From 1952, the company was again called Elsbach Wäschefabriken AG. The shares were returned to the Elsbach family. However, Ahlers remained a shareholder, took over the company completely in 1964 and converted it into a GmbH. In 1992, the Elsbach name was removed from the company in connection with the pending insolvency proceedings, and the company went bankrupt in 1993. The Elsbach brand was continued by Elsbach Hemdenmanufaktur GmbH in Ibbenbüren, which was dissolved in 1998.

In summer 2018, the Kuratorium Erinnern Forschen Gedenken e.V. in Herford presented an exhibition entitled "The Elsbachs, a family and company history", which has been on display as a permanent exhibition in the Elsbach House in Herford since the beginning of 2019. A leporello with the plaque texts is available to take away from the exhibition.

== Products ==
In the early days of the company, only women's underwear was produced, later children's, men's and bed linen were added. Shirts were produced at the branch in Lage and collars in Bielefeld. Around 1950, production included sports shirts, shirts, nightwear and work coats.

== Literature ==
- Gustav Schierholz: Geschichte der Herforder Industrie, Herford ca. 1952, S. 68–70.
- Christoph Laue: Zwischen „Arisierung“ und „Wiedergutmachung“ Die Herforder Elsbach AG zwischen 1938 und 1951, in: Historisches Jahrbuch für den Kreis Herford, Bd. 26, Bielefeld 2019.
