= Werner Baldessarini =

Austrian fashion designer and businessman

Werner Baldessarini (born 23 January 1945, in Kufstein in Tyrol) is an Austrian fashion designer and businessman. He was formerly chairman of Hugo Boss.

== Biography ==
=== Early life ===
Baldessarini's grandparents were of Italian descent, his father was an Austrian textile merchant, his mother was from Nuremberg, Germany. Baldessarini grew up in Munich and began an apprenticeship as a textile merchant in the Munich men's fashion store Hirmer at the age of 16. He then worked as a buyer at men's outfitter Wagenheimer in Munich and became managing director.

=== Hugo Boss ===
In 1975, Baldessarini joined the company Hugo Boss. He was promoted chief designer and joined Hugo Boss' executive board in 1988, which he also headed starting in 1998. The owner of Boss at the time, Uwe Holy, had met Baldessarini through Wagenheimer. He was asked by the founders of Hugo Boss to drive the growth of the company.

In 1993, under the leadership of then CEO Peter Littmann and head designer Baldessarini, Baldessarini the luxury label for men was introduced. The more youthful HUGO label was presented for the first time in 1993 as well. Under Baldessarini's leadership, the sportswear label Boss Orange (1998) and the women's fashion line Boss woman (2000) were introduced. In 2002, Baldessarini was replaced as CEO of Hugo Boss by Bruno Sälzer and moved to the company's supervisory board, where he remained until 2005. In 2004, the brand Baldessarini was spun off from Hugo Boss AG as a subsidiary and the company headquarters were moved from Metzingen to Munich.

In August 2006, Hugo Boss sold the Baldessarini brand to Werner Baldessarini.

=== After Hugo Boss ===
In August 2006, Baldessarini in turn sold the Baldessarini textiles brand to Ahlers AG in Herford for an estimated price between EUR 6 million and 9 million. Since 2007, the Baldessarini brand has been managed without Werner Baldessarini, although he was originally supposed to act as a consultant until 2012.

In 2010, Baldessarini was appointed to the Supervisory Board of Austrian hosiery manufacturer Wolford. He stepped down in 2013.

As of 2020, Baldessarini was still involved in the licensing of Baldessarini fragrances.

Since the takeover of the Ahlers AG by German Röther Group in 2023 the Baldessarini brand has been managed by their subsidiary New Baldessarini GmbH as part of the R.Brand Group.

== Private life ==
Werner Baldessarini lives in Kitzbühel with his wife Cathrin (*1963), whom he married in 1994.

On September 11, 2001, Baldessarini was on a Lufthansa plane bound for New York City when the September 11 attacks took place. Like 37 other planes, the plane was diverted to Gander, Newfoundland. Around 6,500 passengers were stranded in Gander for four days. Baldessarini refused an offer of an earlier departure and stayed with the rest of the passengers until everyone was able to leave. Baldessarini's experience in Gander was one of the stories recounted in Jim DeFede's book The Day the World Came to Town.
