= List of museums in Cologne =

This is a list of museums in Cologne, Germany:

- Museums of the City of Cologne – (K)
- The private museums – (P)
- Museum of the university – (U)

== Museums ==
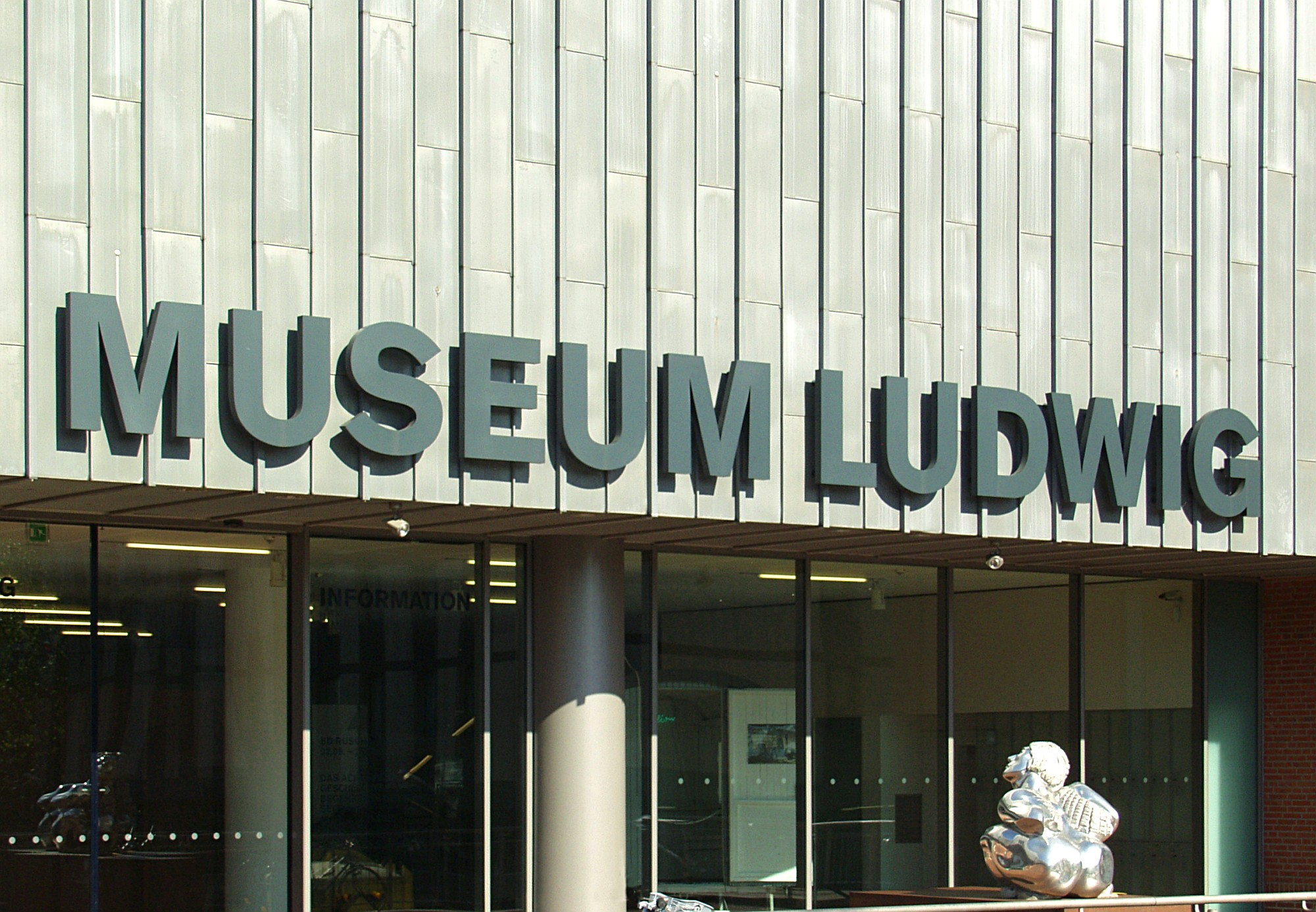
The Museum Ludwig (above) and the Wallraf-Richartz Museum are the largest art museums in Cologne.

=== Art ===
- Museum Ludwig – Modern art; e.g. pop art and Russian avant-garde (K)
- Wallraf-Richartz Museum – Paintings from medieval period to early twentieth century (K)
- Schnütgen Museum – Christian religious art mainly from medieval period (K)
- Museum für Angewandte Kunst – Museum of Applied Art (K)
- Museum für Ostasiatische Kunst – Museum of East Asian Art (K)
- artothek – (K)
- Kolumba – Art museum of the Archdiocese of Cologne (P)
- Domschatzkammer – Treasure of the Cologne Cathedral (P)
- Kölnischer Kunstverein – (P)
- Käthe Kollwitz Museum – (P)
- Skulpturen Park Köln – (P)
- August Sander Archive – (P)

=== History and culture ===
- EL-DE Haus – Nazism Documentation Centre located in the former headquarters of the Gestapo (K)
- Romano-Germanic Museum – Roman artifacts mainly from the Roman settlement Colonia Claudia Ara Agrippinensium (K)
- Kölnisches Stadtmuseum – History of the City of Cologne (K)
- Rautenstrauch-Joest Museum – Ethnology (K)
- Rheinisches Bildarchiv – Rhenish Photographic Archive (K)
- Fragrance museum – Farina House, History of Eau de Cologne and modern perfumery (P)
- Imhoff-Schokoladenmuseum – Imhoff Chocolate Museum (P)
- German Sport & Olympia Museum – (P)
- Cologne Carnival Museum – (P)
- Deutsches Tanzarchiv Köln – German Dance Archive Cologne (P)

=== Science and nature ===
- Odysseum – Science center – (P)
- Geomuseum – Museum of Geology, palaeontology and mineralogy – (U)
