= Johann Maria Farina gegenüber dem Jülichs-Platz =

World's oldest perfume factory

Johann Maria Farina gegenüber dem Jülichs-Platz GmbH
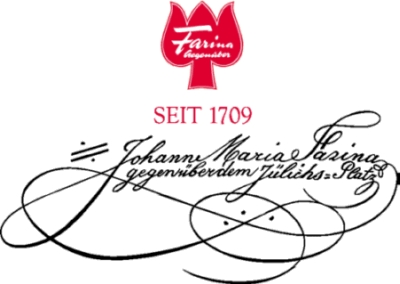
- Type: Private
- Industry: Perfume
- Founded: 1709
- Founder: Johann Baptist Farina
- Headquarters: Cologne, Germany
- Key people: Johann Maria Farina XIX (CEO)
- Products: Eau de Cologne
- Website: Official website

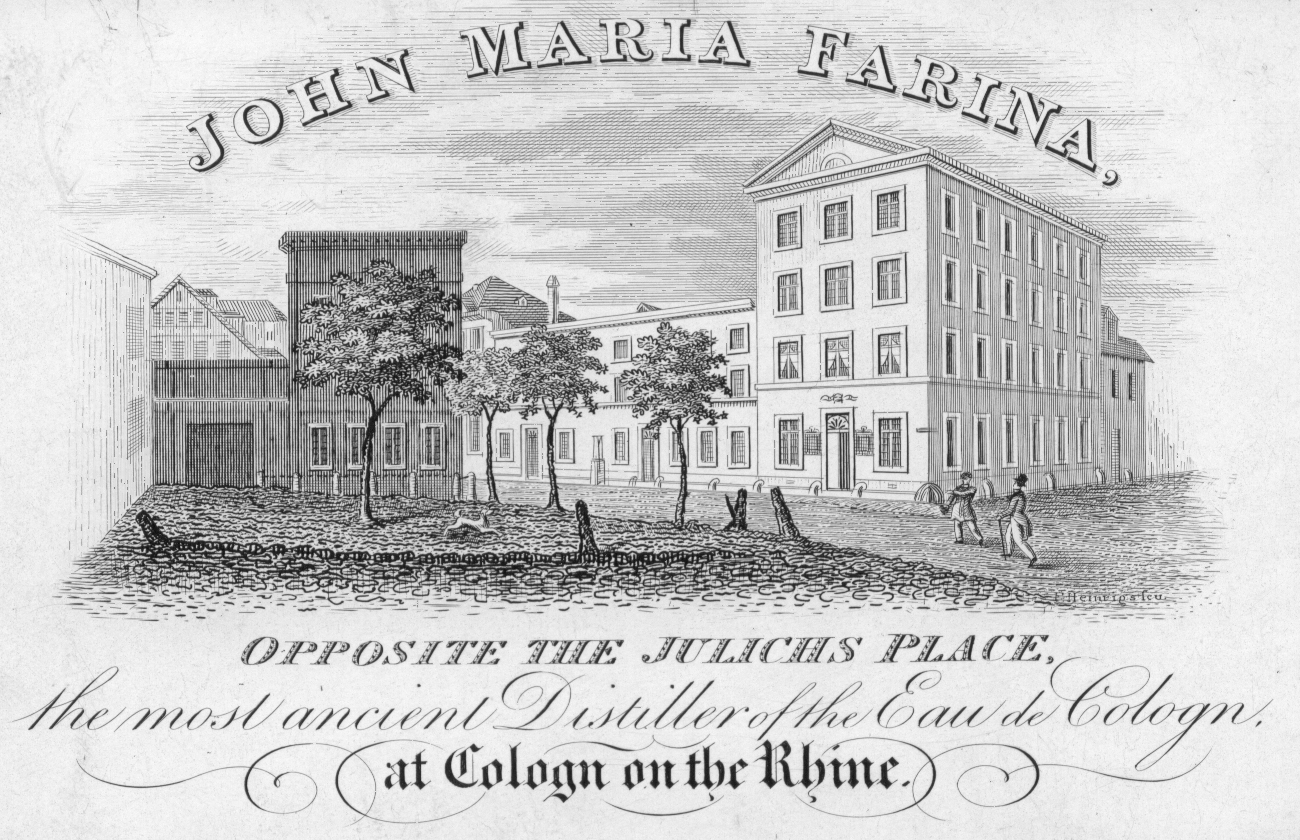
Farina House

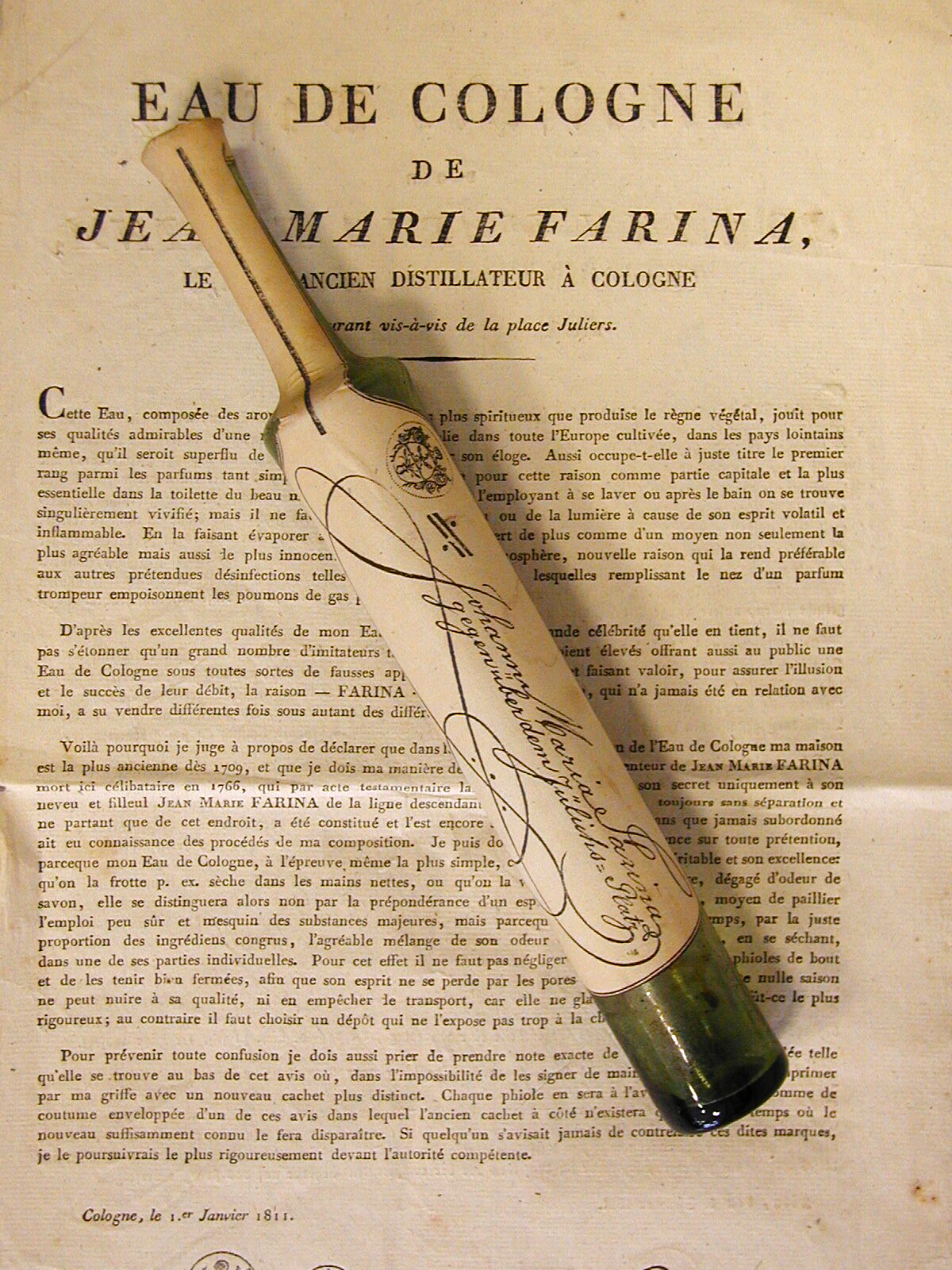
Original Eau de Cologne – The Rosoli bottle is the first to have been produced by Farina House. The instruction leaflet in French is in the background. The slim green bottle had to be stored in a horizontal position because it was corked. Until 1832, Eau de Cologne was only sold in Rosoli bottles.

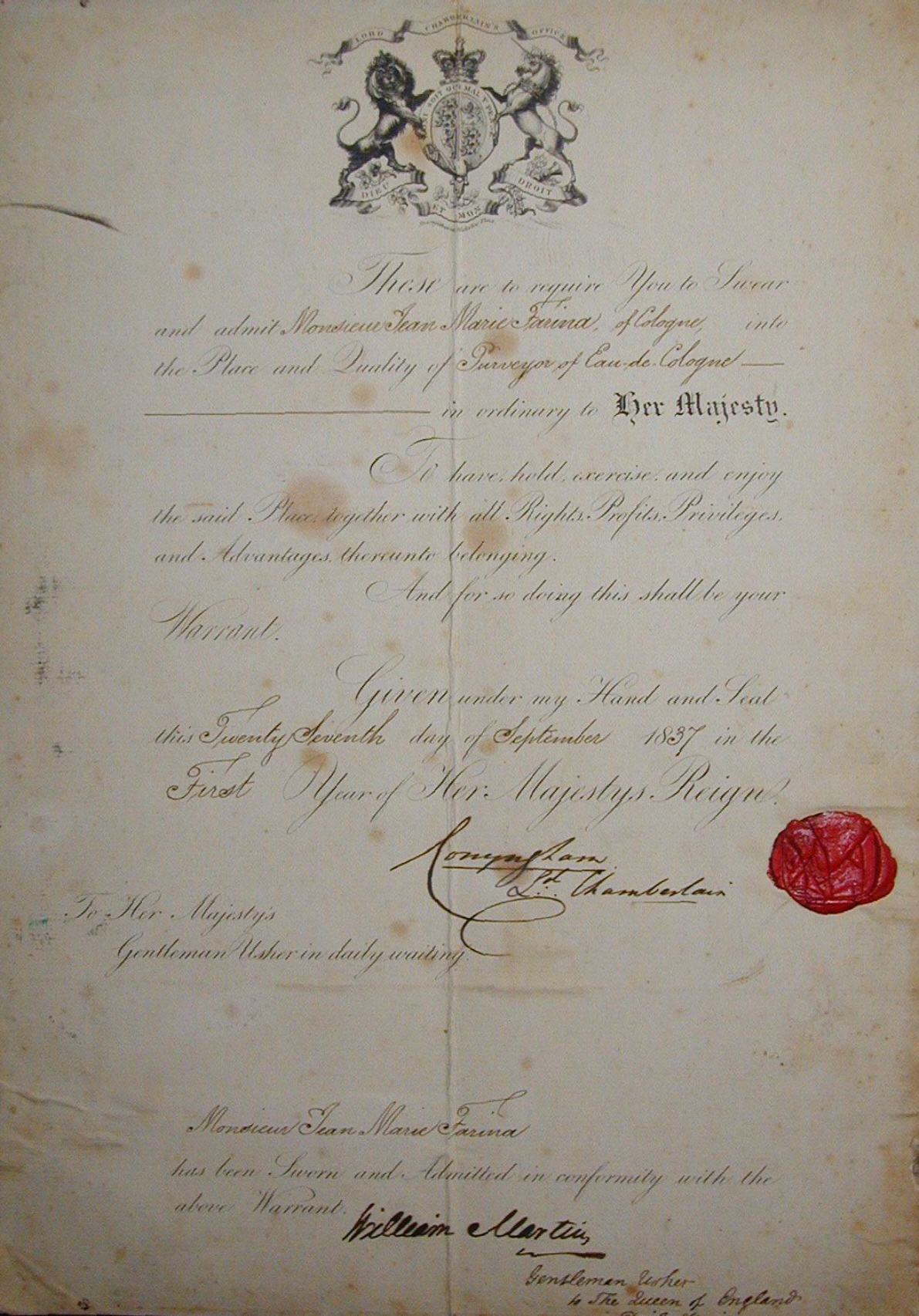
Royal Warrant granted by Queen Victoria in 1837

Johann Maria Farina gegenüber dem Jülichs-Platz GmbH (German for 'John Maria Farina opposite Jülich's Square') is the world's oldest eau de Cologne and perfume factory. It traces its origins to a luxury goods retail business founded in 1709 in Cologne by Giovanni Battista Farina (German: Johann Baptist Farina), who was subsequently joined in the business by his younger brother, Giovanni Maria Farina (German: Johann Maria Farina). The short form 'Farina gegenüber' and the French name 'Jean Marie Farina vis-à-vis de la place Juliers' were also commonly used over a long period of time. The company's logo is a red tulip.

The company is still run by the founding family's descendants, who are the eighth generation of family members. The company has held royal warrants as purveyors of perfume to the German, French, Italian, Swedish, Russian and British royal families. The company headquarters and birthplace of eau de Cologne are both to be found at Farina House in Cologne, Germany, where the Farina Fragrance Museum is also located.

== The company’s history ==
=== The Johann Maria Farina (I) years, 1709–1766 ===
==== Ancestors ====
The founding of Farina House dates back to the early 18th century. In June 1709, Johann Baptist Farina travelled to Cologne, where his younger brother Johann Maria Farina had been working for their uncle since 1708. On 13 July 1709, Johann Baptist Farina (Italian: Giovanni Battista Farina) founded the company G.B. Farina and, from that point on, started his book-keeping, which has never been interrupted since.

On 17 July 1709, Johann Baptist Farina registered as a new resident at Cologne town hall and on the 24th was granted free citizenship. In those days, this procedure was necessary for a settler to set up a private business. With the support of his uncle, who was a member of the Maastricht government, and the salesman Johann Maria Farina (originally named Giovanni Maria Farina), Johann Baptist Farina (II) signed on 1 August 1709 a twelve-year contract to rent a building at the junction of the streets Großen Bottengassen and Goldschmidts, now known as Unter Goldschmidt.

Johann Baptist and his brother-in-law, Franz Balthasar Borgnis, then founded 'Farina & Compagnie', which later developed into 'Gebrüder Farina & Comp.' (English: Farina Brothers and Co.) after Johann Maria Farina (I) and Carl Hieronymus Farina joined in 1714 and 1716. The Farina company sold a wide range of luxury items, such as lace, handkerchiefs, silk stockings, wigs, feathers, tobacco boxes, sealing wax and face powder that one would have expected to find in a shop run by Italians.

==== Johann Maria Farina House ====
After 1716, Gebrüder Farina & Comp. experienced a number of financial difficulties, which led to Franz Balthasar Borgnis’ and Carl Hieronymus Farina’s departures. This left Johann Baptist Farina (II) and Johann Maria Farina (I) at the head of the company, which was subsequently named 'Fratelli Farina' (English: Farina Brothers). In the years that followed, the two brothers concentrated on transporting goods, an enterprise which, however, did not prove to be successful.

Johann Baptist Farina (II) died on 24 April 1732. In the subsequent months, Johann Maria Farina (I) carried out an inventory before renaming the business 'Johann Maria Farina', a name which has remained unchanged ever since. After this change, business improved, as he wrote in a letter addressed to his relative, Francesco Barbieri, back in Italy:

… comintio avanzare in eta e si come laudato a dio che ho fatto il primo e il piu difficile fondamento di questo mio negotio che mi da pane cotidiano e che va dun giono a l’altro sempre di bene in meglio, il mio bramo col tempo sarebe di vedere in mia piaza un giovine proprio di podere continuare e reduplicarlo …	”...I have reached the point where the difficulties which I first had to face up to are from day to day improving. It is now up to me to see that the business thrives and in time doubles...”

After having been at the head of this business for less than two years, Johann Maria Farina was granted the right to citizenship by the city of Cologne. The following decades, the 1730s and 1740s, happened to be very prosperous ones, during which he concentrated his efforts on the business of delivery, and it was only at the beginning of the 1760s that the perfume business took centre stage.

==== An astounding fragrance ====
In 1703, long before he joined his brother to found 'Farina & Compagnie' in 1714, Johann Maria Farina (I) put his skills to work and created a fragrance that was to become a great success. Indeed, the Italian perfume maker gave birth to a whole new type of complex fragrance, which combined several essences with pure alcohol, an innovative combination. The fragrance was fresh, which contrasted to most of the known heavy scents of the time, such as cinnamon oil, sandalwood oil or musk.

In 1708, Johann Maria Farina wrote a letter to his brother, Johann Baptist Farina, in which he describes his perfume as follows:

“I have created a perfume which is reminiscent of a spring morning following a soft shower where fragrances of wild narcissi combine with that of sweet orange flowers. This perfume refreshes me and stimulates both my senses and imagination”.

The top note is essentially composed of citrus fruits, Bergamot being the main component. The latter has to be picked whilst still green, as only the unripe peel is suitable for the production of Farina’s perfume. Furthermore, the fact that only natural essences were and still are used means that the perfume maker must blend and combine various vintages to obtain a constant fragrance. Plants react to various climatic changes, thus causing their scent to vary. Farina was meticulous in this regard and regularly set aside small samples of his perfume which were then used as comparisons to ensure his perfume did not undergo any changes. Some samples exist today.

==== Eau de Cologne takes over the European market ====
Initially, Farina limited the sale of his perfume to Cologne and Frankfurt’s trade centre. The first delivery dates back to 1716, when Farina sent 12 bottles to a Madame Billy in Aachen.

From 1730 onwards, Farina’s list of customers expanded at a great pace and, according to records, 3,700 bottles were delivered to a total of 39 addresses between 1730 and 1739. His perfume, which delighted the upper nobility, soon became a royal and imperial favourite. By 1740, eau de Cologne was a great success and was sold in Rouen, Paris, Strasburg, Magdeburg, Trier, Wesel, Kleve, Lyon, Vienna, Amsterdam, The Hague, Liège, Lille, Aachen, Düsseldorf, Bonn, Braunschweig, Frankfurt, Leipzig, Augsburg, Stuttgart, Bamberg, Mainz, Warsaw and Koblenz.

In a letter dated 9 April 1747, Farina explains that his perfume is known throughout Europe.

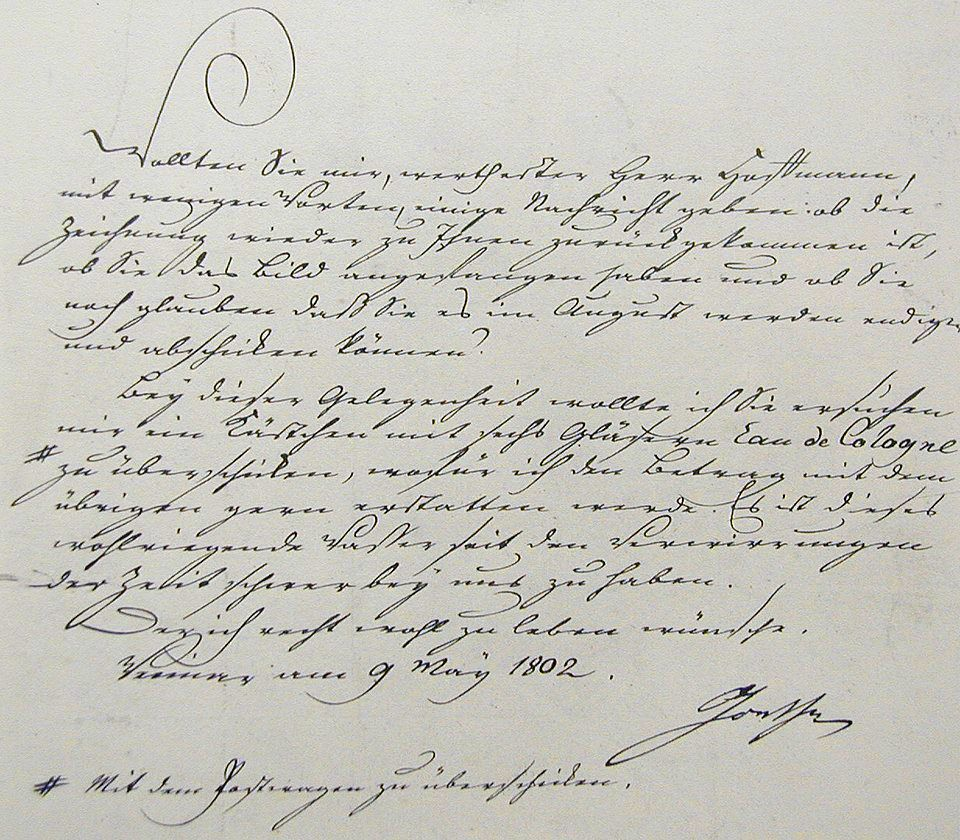
Goethe Letter. On 9 May 1802, Goethe wrote a letter to the painter Hoffmann residing in Cologne: "... I seize this opportunity to ask you to please have a box of 6 bottles of Eau de Cologne sent to me. I will pay you back along with the rest." Goethe’s order was sent to Weimar on 22 May 1802.

==== Packaging, quality seal and advertising ====
Johann Maria Farina (I) had his eau de Cologne filled into long bottles, the so-called Rosoli bottle. Both full measures (8 ounces) and half measures of eau de Cologne were sold and, in the 1760s, one could also find quarter bottles. Half bottles were most common and a dozen of them would have been sold for 6 Reichsthaler or 9 Guilder. The items were initially sold individually, whereas later Farina delivered his perfume in boxes of 4, 6, 8, 12 and 18 bottles.

The red seal, which bore the family crest and which appeared on all products, was a sign of quality and authenticity. Each delivery was also accompanied by a signed document on which the directions for use were printed. According to the document, eau de Cologne was not exclusively intended for exterior use. It was described as good for dental hygiene, efficient against bad breath and a way of avoiding infectious diseases. In August 1785, a certain Mrs Duplessis from Nogent enquired whether eau de Cologne could in any way help her paralysed husband. In his response, Johann Maria Farina (III) suggested she dampen some pieces of cloth in the perfume before applying them to her husband's aching limbs and recommended she add 50 drops of eau de Cologne to his weekly drinking water. The letter ended as follows: “At least you run no risk of harming him in any way”. However, the healing properties were removed from the instruction leaflet in 1811 and used only in advertisements. In 1803, the signature that had featured on the information leaflet was replaced by a stamp, which then made it possible to enclose a leaflet with each individual bottle.

=== The company under Johann Maria Farina (III), 1766–1792 ===
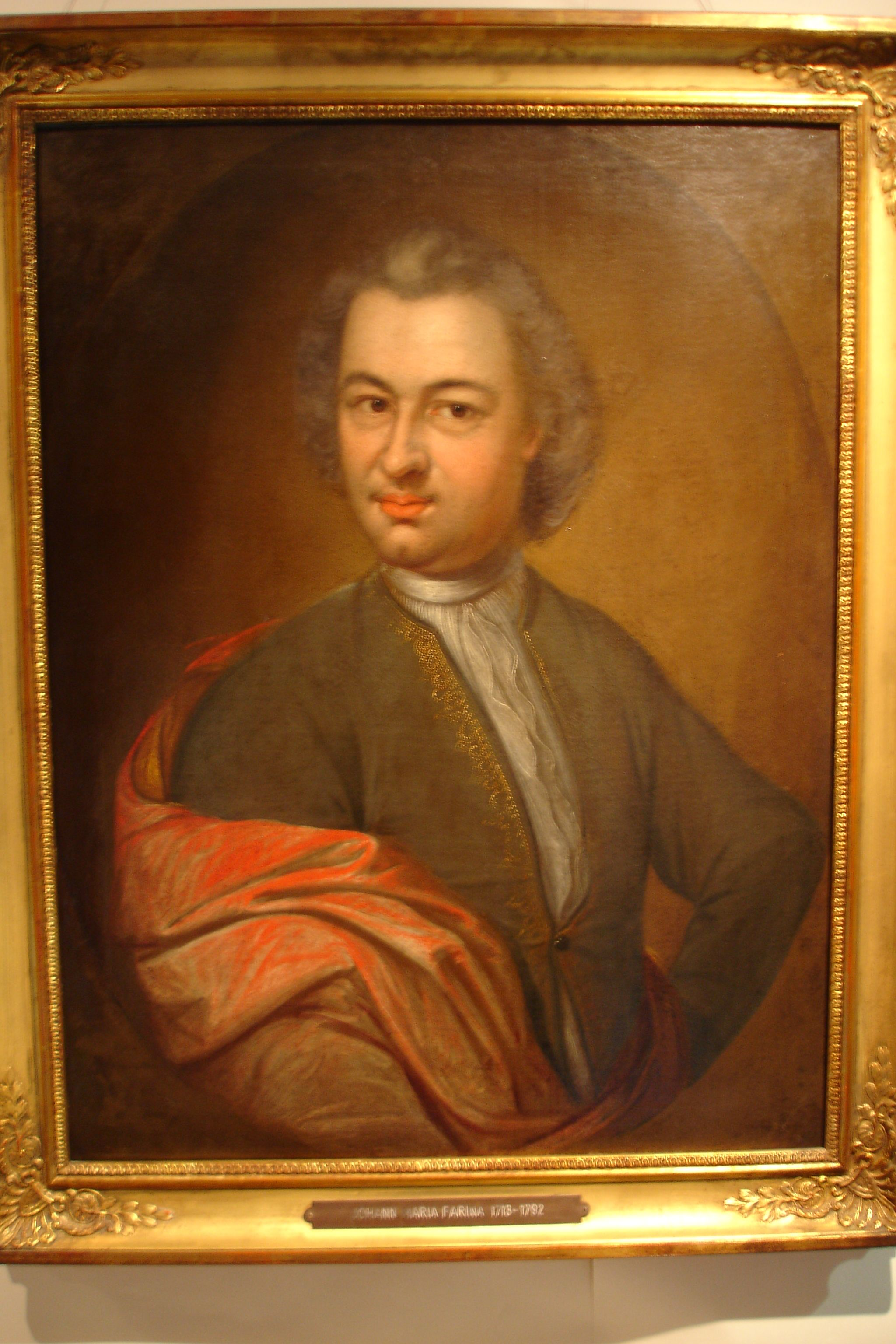
Johann Maria Farina III. (1713–1792)

== Notable customers ==
=== Royalty and aristocrats ===
- Frederick William I of Prussia (1734)
- Clemens August of Bavaria (1736)
- Charles VI, Holy Roman Emperor (1738)
- Maria Theresa of Austria (1740)
- Louis XV of France (1745)
- Frederick II of Prussia (1745)
- Ferdinand VI of Spain (1758)
- Stanisław August Poniatowski (1791)
- Louise of Mecklenburg-Strelitz (1797)
- Gustav IV Adolf of Sweden (1800)
- Napoleon Bonaparte (1804)
- Archduke Anton Victor of Austria (1806)
- Maria Carolina of Austria (1809)
- Pauline Bonaparte (1810)
- Letizia Bonaparte (1810)
- Jérôme Bonaparte, King of Westphalia (1810)
- Marie Louise, Duchess of Parma (1811)
- Francis II, Holy Roman Emperor (1811)
- Prince Hermann von Pückler-Muskau (1811)
- Alexander I of Russia (1815)
- Prince Klemens Wenzel von Metternich (1815)
- Pedro I of Brazil (1822)
- William IV of the United Kingdom (1830)
- Queen Victoria of the United Kingdom (1837)
- Frederick William IV of Prussia (1841)
- Nicholas I of Russia (1843)
- Leopold II, Prince of Lippe (1843)
- Henry, Duke of Anhalt-Köthen (1845)
- Ernest Augustus, King of Hanover (1846)
- Adolphe, Grand Duke of Luxembourg (1846)
- Christian VIII of Denmark (1847)
- Bernhard II, Duke of Saxe-Meiningen (1848)
- Frederick Augustus II of Saxony (1850)
- Frederick VII of Denmark (1850)
- Alexander II of Russia (1855)
- John of Saxony (1855)
- Georg, Grand Duke of Mecklenburg-Strelitz (1859)
- Wilhelm I, German Emperor (1861)
- Friedrich Wilhelm, Grand Duke of Mecklenburg-Strelitz (1862)
- Luís I of Portugal (1866)
- Louis III, Grand Duke of Hesse (1866)
- Napoleon III of France (1868)
- Charles I of Württemberg (1868)
- Alexandra of Denmark (1870)
- Wilhelm I, German Emperor (1871)
- Ludwig II of Bavaria (1872)
- Franz Joseph I of Austria (1872)
- Elisabeth of Bavaria (1872)
- Leopold II of Belgium (1873)
- Albert of Saxony (1873)
- Oscar II of Sweden (1874)
- Victoria, Princess Royal (1874)
- Victor Emmanuel II of Italy (1876)
- Christian IX of Denmark (1877)
- Umberto I of Italy (1878)
- Louis IV, Grand Duke of Hesse (1879)
- William III of the Netherlands (1880)
- Carol I of Romania (1881)
- Frederick Francis II, Grand Duke of Mecklenburg-Schwerin (1882)
- Frederick III, German Emperor (1888)
- Wilhelm II, German Emperor (1888)
- Otto of Bavaria (1894)
- Edward VII of the United Kingdom (1901)
- George V of the United Kingdom (1910)
- Gustaf V of Sweden (1927)
- Soraya Esfandiary (1951)
- Diana, Princess of Wales (1987)

=== Others ===
- Voltaire (1745)
- Wolfgang Amadeus Mozart (1782)
- Johann Wolfgang von Goethe (1802)
- Ludwig van Beethoven (1807)
- Friedrich Schiller (1814)
- Alexander von Humboldt (1815)
- Heinrich Heine (1824)
- Benjamin Disraeli (1868)
- Mark Twain (1877)
- Mori Ōgai (1888)
- Oscar Wilde (1889)
- Thomas Mann (1921)
- Franz Lehár (1925)
- Konrad Adenauer (1928)
- Marlene Dietrich (1935)
- Heinz Rühmann (1939)
- Indira Gandhi (1959)
- Romy Schneider (1959)
- Françoise Sagan (1964)
- Hildegard Knef (1970)

== Gallery ==
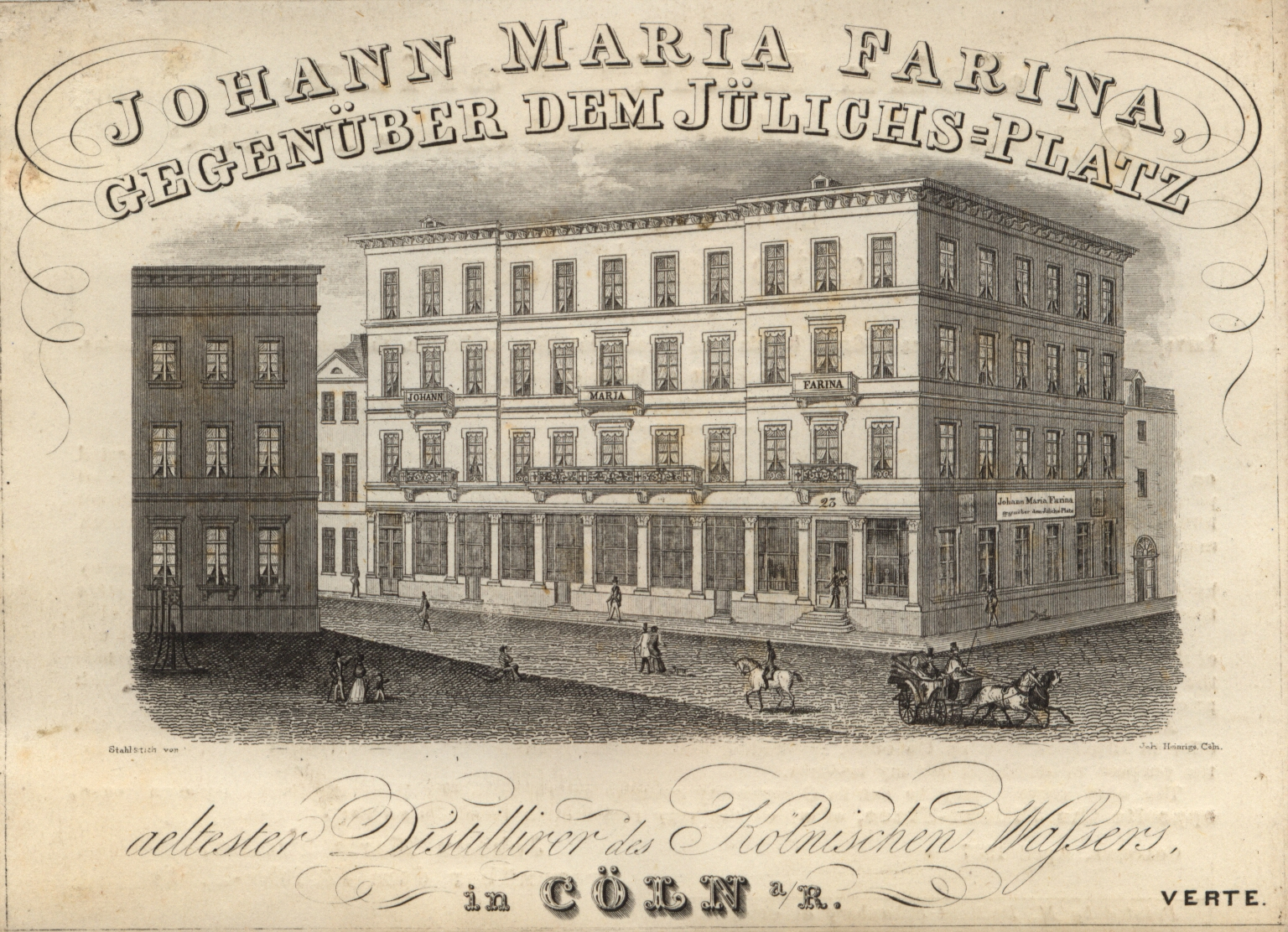
Farina House in 1849

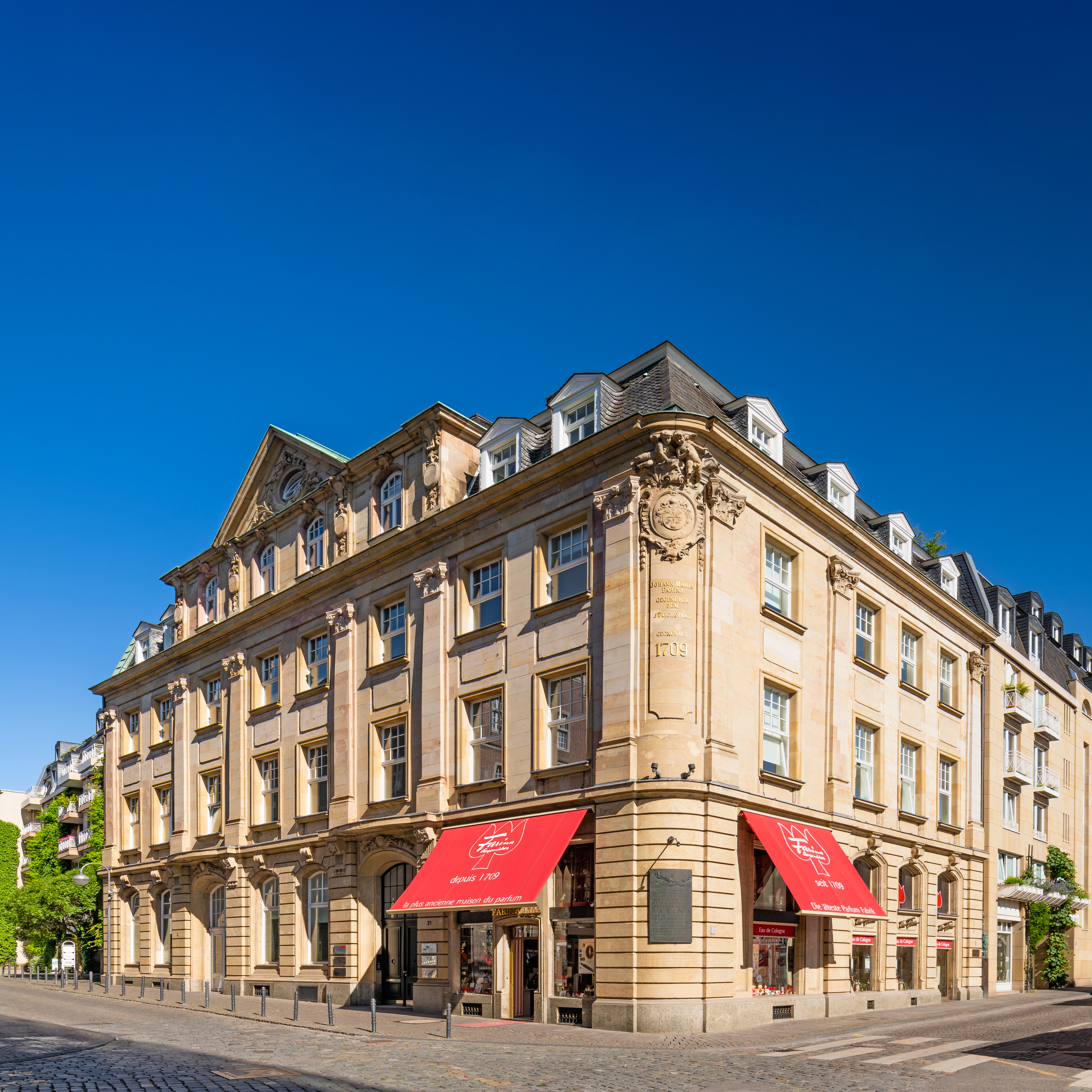
Farina House today

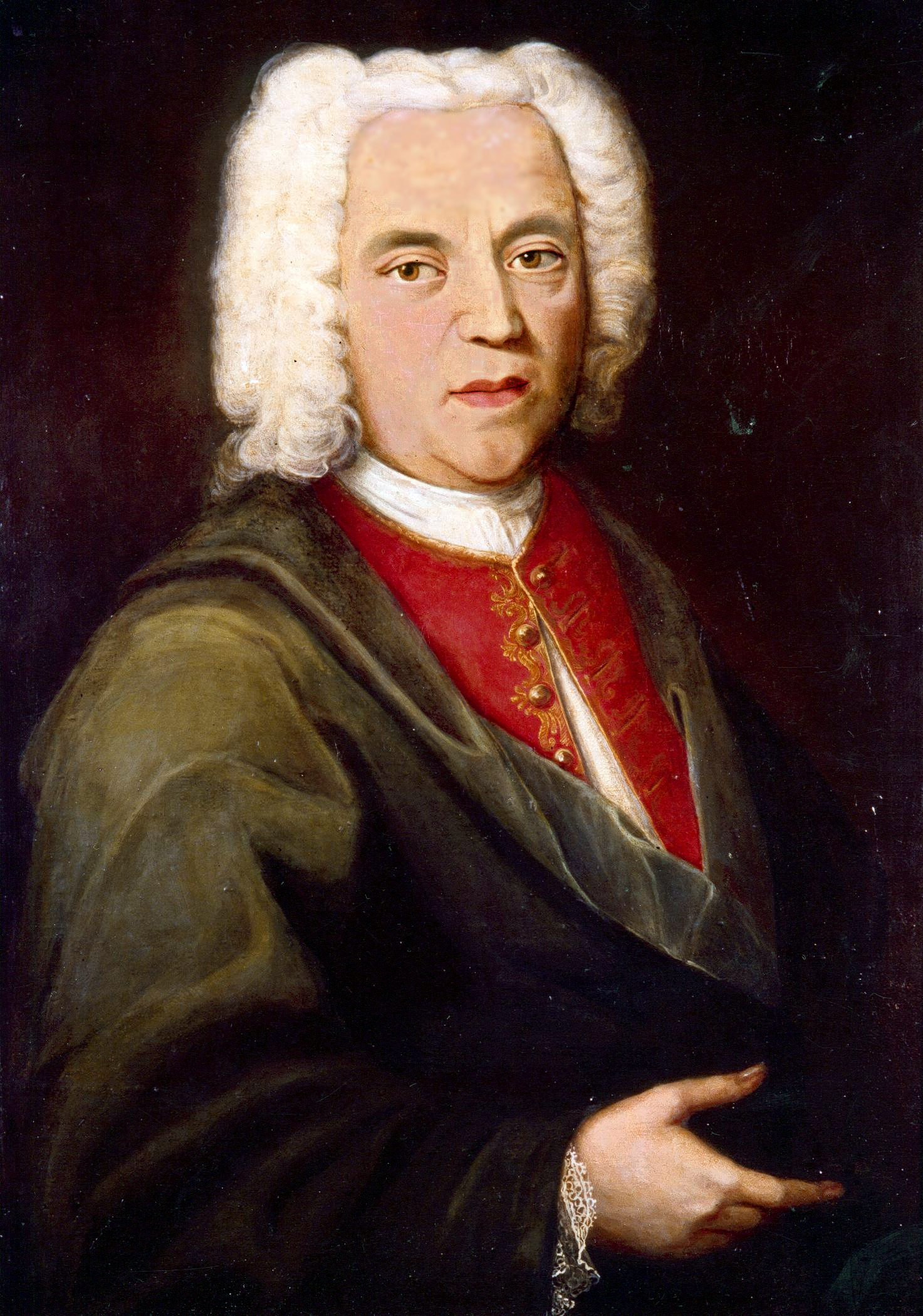
Johann Maria Farina (1685–1766)

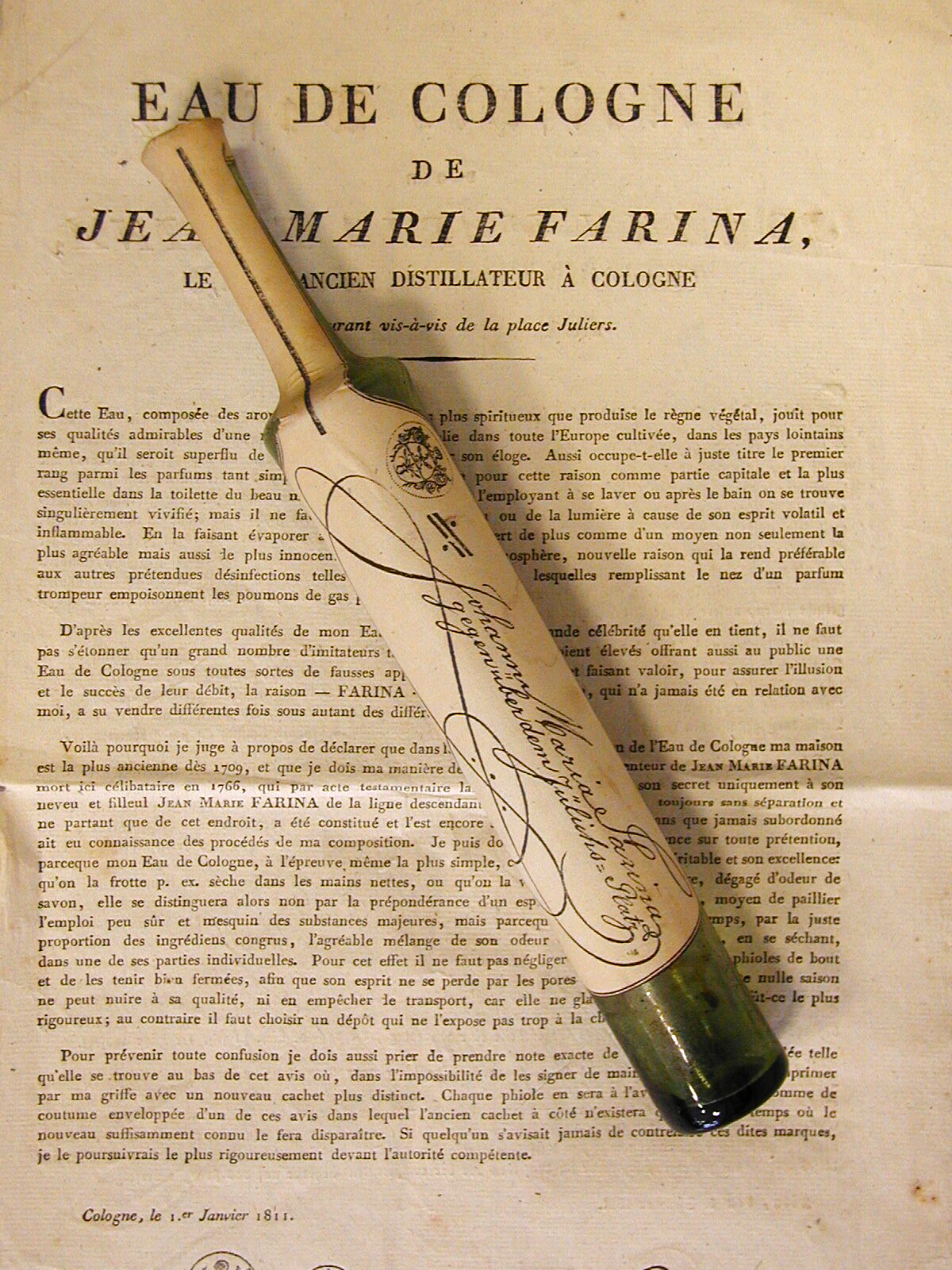
The original Eau de Cologne

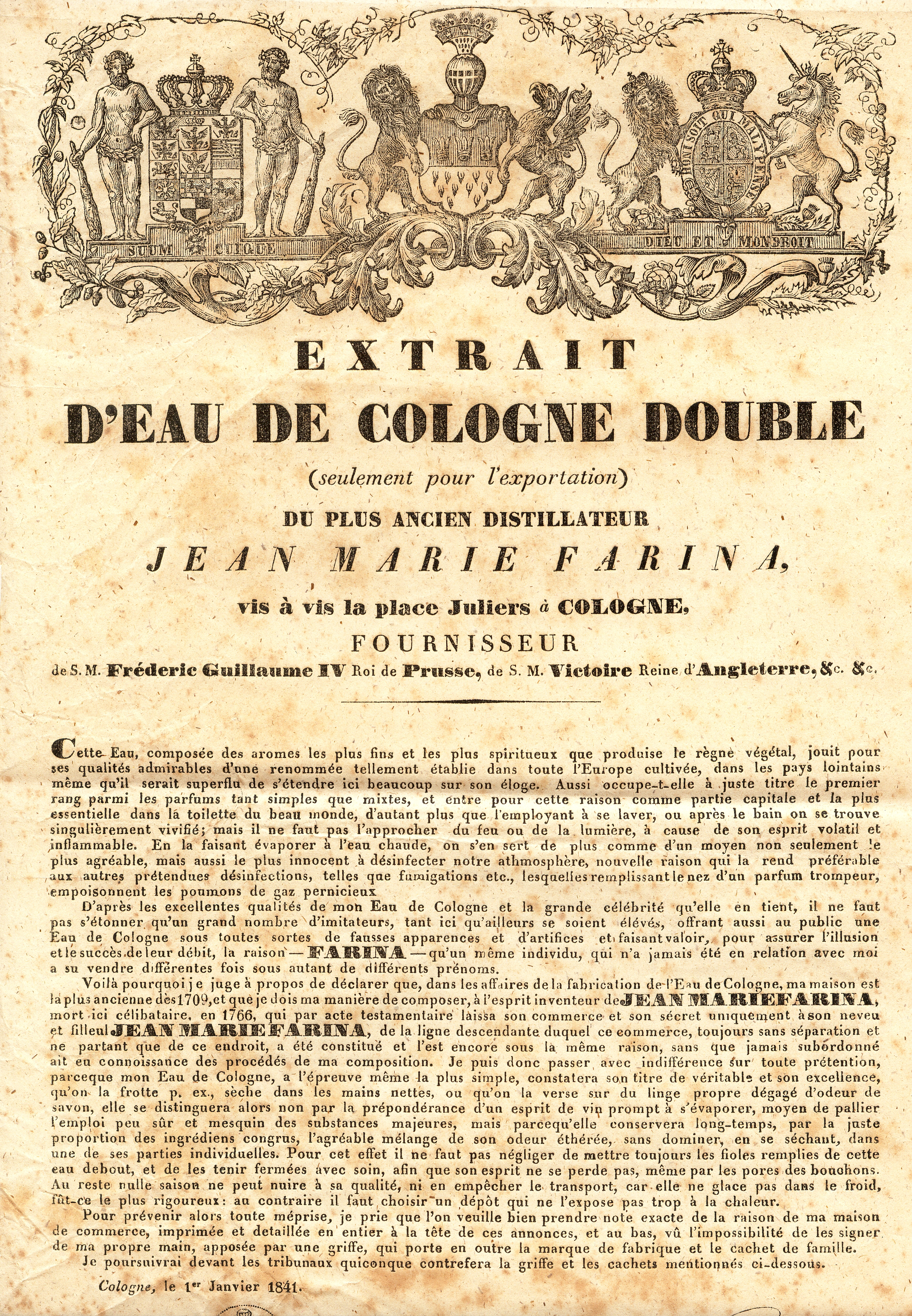
