= Johann Maria Farina =

Italian-born perfume maker

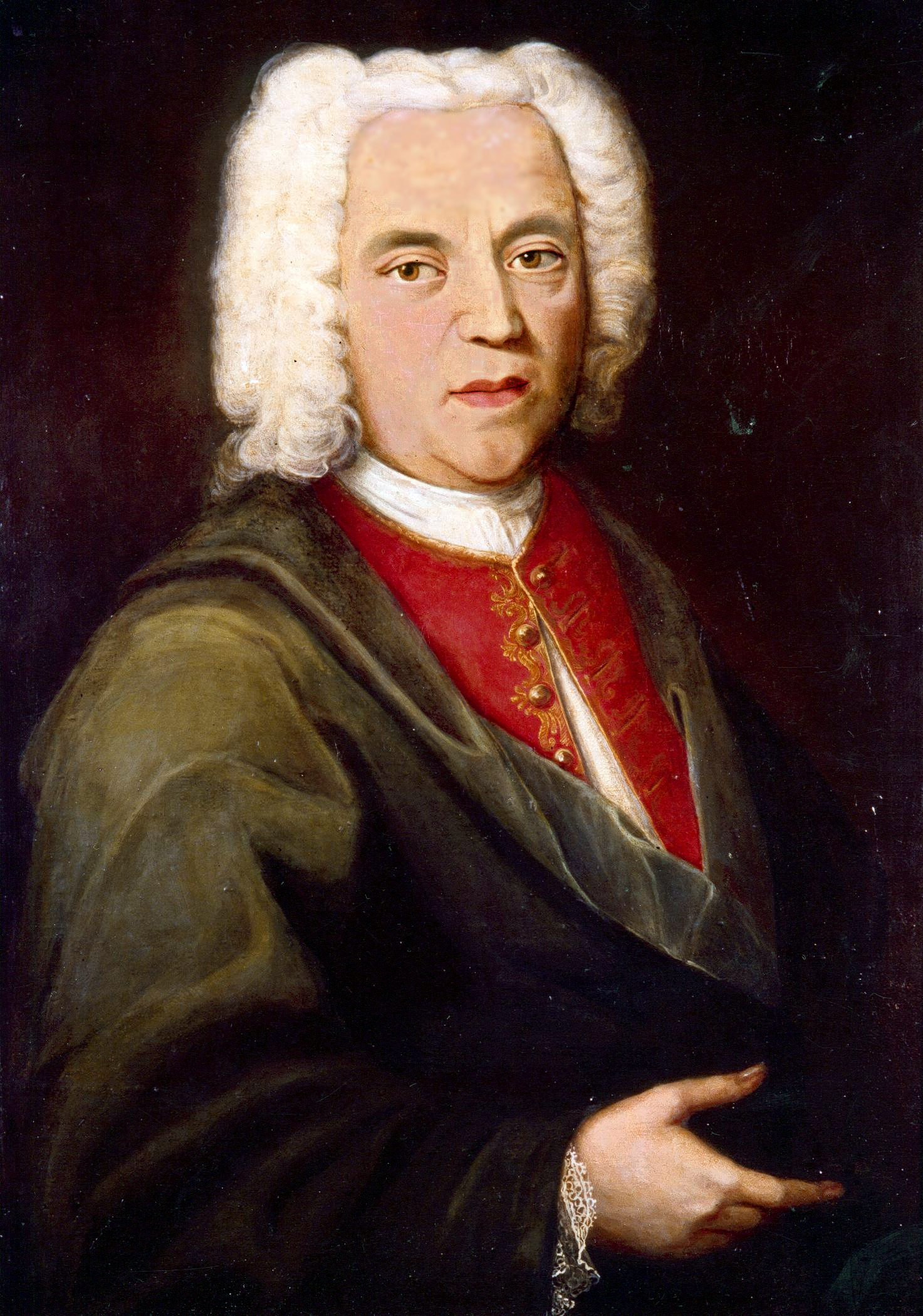
Johann Maria Farina 1685–1766

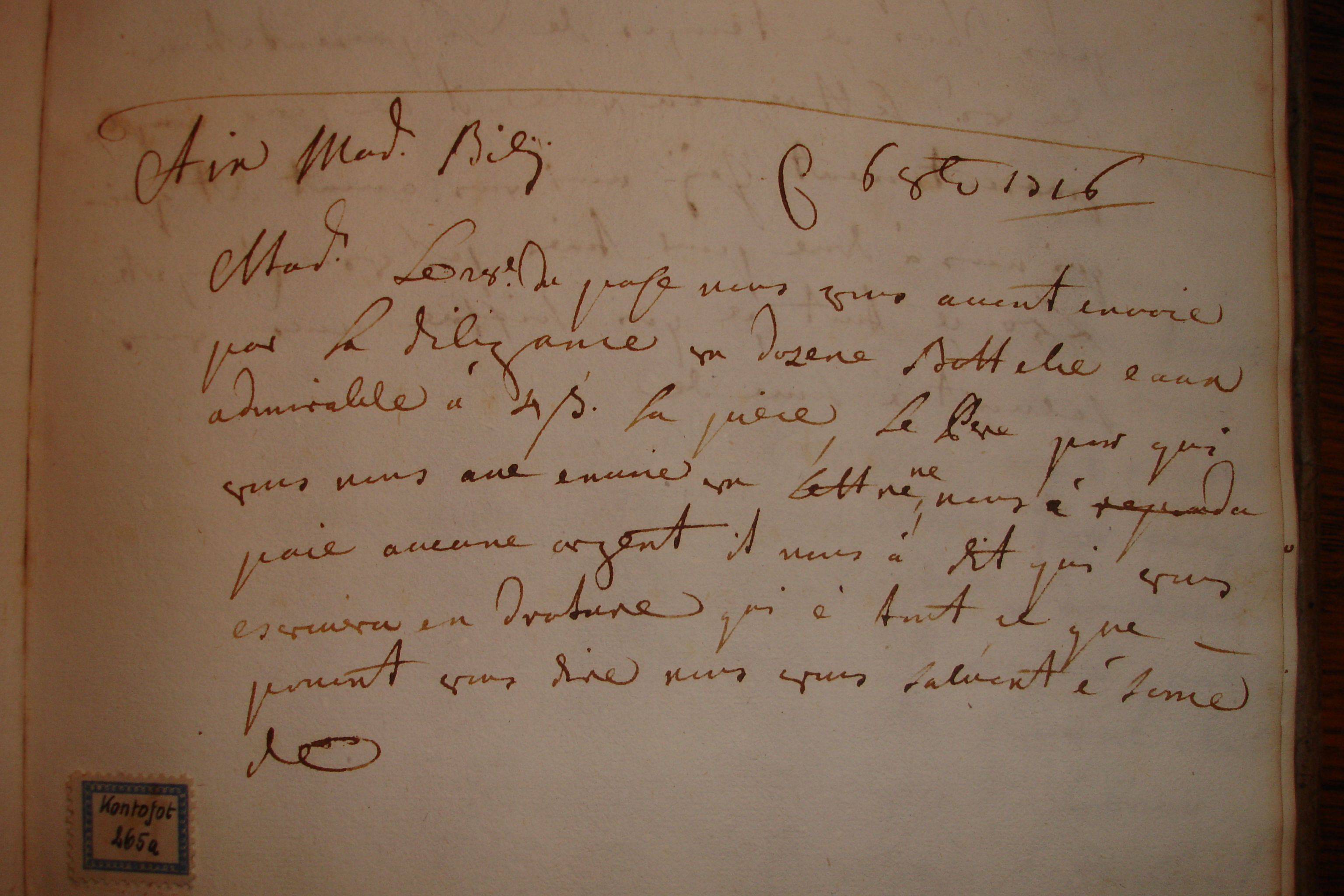
Letter for one of the orders of Farina's new fragrance, 1716

Giovanni Maria Farina (German: Johann Maria Farina, French: Jean Marie Farina; 8 December 1685 – 25 November 1766) was an Italian-born perfumier in Germany who created the first Eau de Cologne.

== Life ==
Farina was born in Santa Maria Maggiore in the Duchy of Milan (under Habsburg rule). He settled in Cologne (Electorate of Cologne, Holy Roman Empire) in 1706 (as a business representative of his uncle), and joined the company of his brother Johann Baptist Farina (1683–1732), which he had founded on 17 July 1709. This company would eventually become Johann Maria Farina gegenüber dem Jülichs-Platz GmbH (as of 1 March 1733), the world’s oldest perfume factory still in existence.

His subtle fragrance, Eau de Cologne, became famous worldwide and, in the 18th century, was an indispensable accessory at all royal courts. The perfume maker named his perfume after his new hometown to honour it. Indeed, when Farina first moved to Cologne, strict laws governed foreign settlers. Farina was granted citizenship and, to show his gratitude, named his first creation Eau de Cologne (lit. French: "Water of Cologne"). This perfume, being a real sensation at the time, contributed to Cologne’s global fame.

Being the very first perfume of its kind on the market, the word "Cologne" quickly became a household name.

Cologne refers to a perfume that is usually refreshingly light, unisex, with a citrus-based head note.

The perfume was given a French name because, in the 17th and 18th centuries, French was spoken in European high society and used by tradesmen, hence Farina's decision. Counterfeits of the perfume only appeared at the end of the 18th century. After the French Revolution, Napoleon's troops occupied Cologne from 1794 to 1814 and introduced freedom of trade. At the time, registered trademarks did not exist, so counterfeits were common.

== Death and legacy ==
Farina died on 25 November 1766 in Cologne, aged 80. Today, the 8th generation of the Farina family still produces the original Eau de Cologne.

== Gallery ==
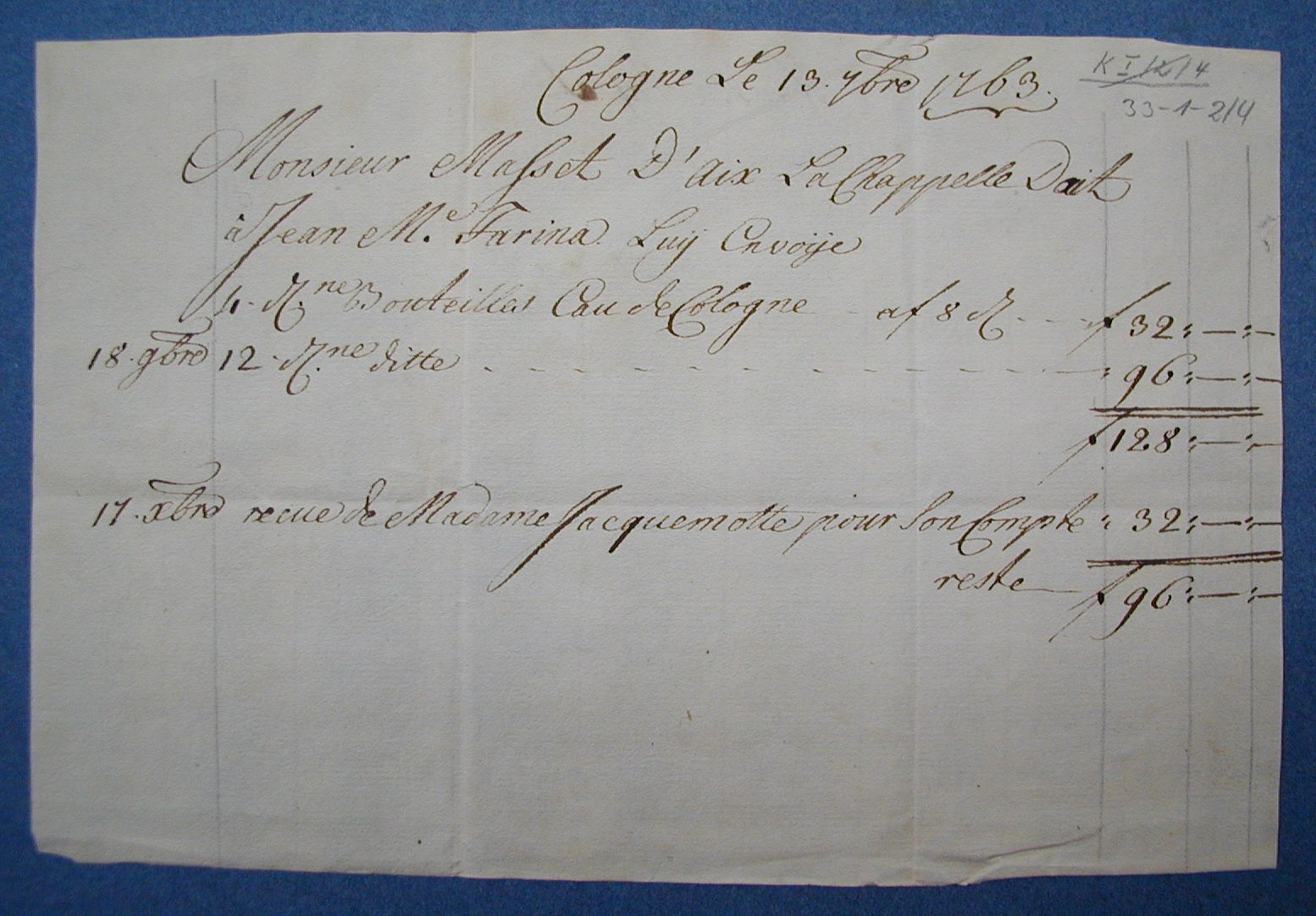
Invoice for Eau de Cologne, 1763

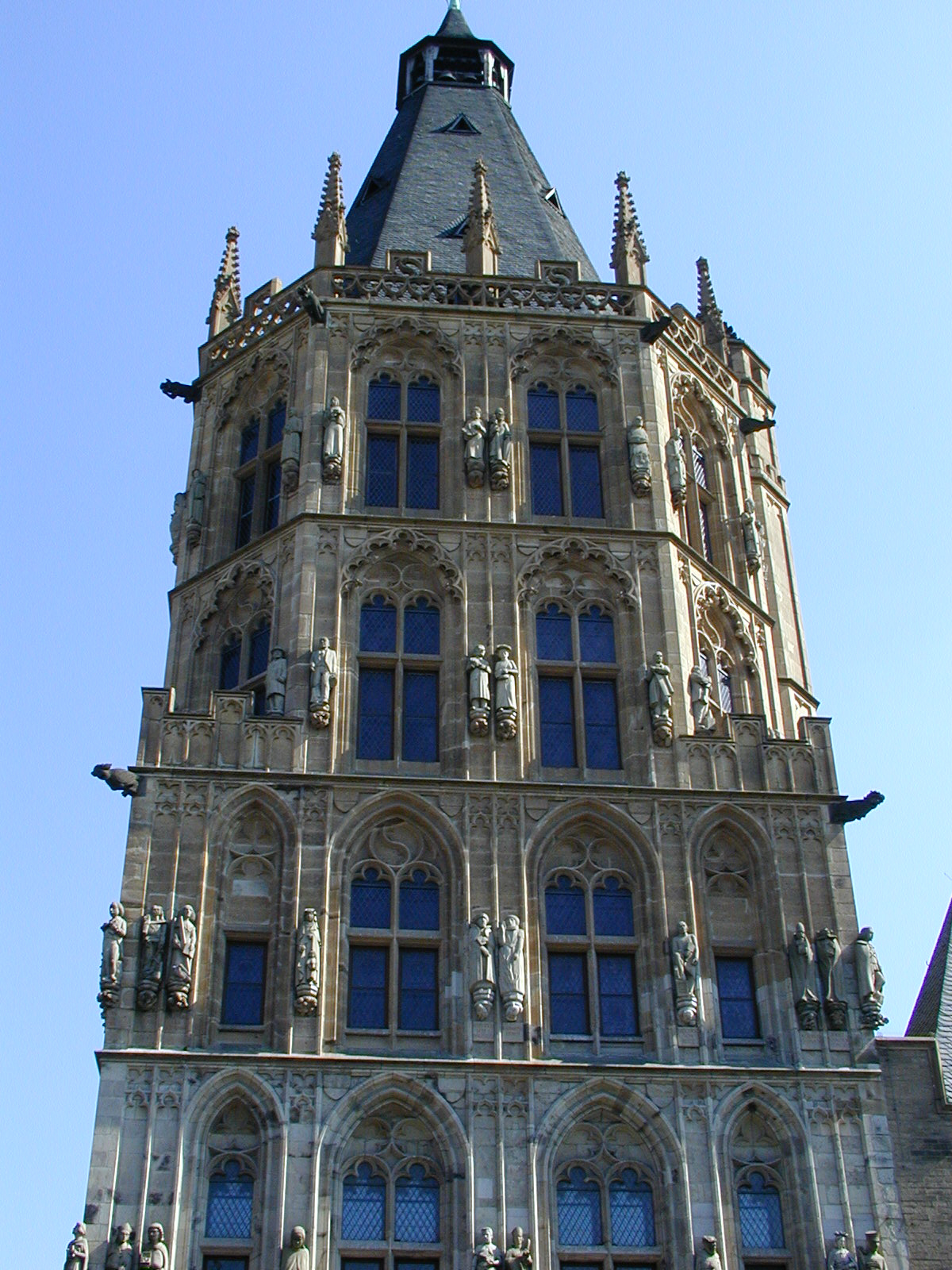
Town hall tower in Cologne with statue of Johann Maria Farina, left side, second floor

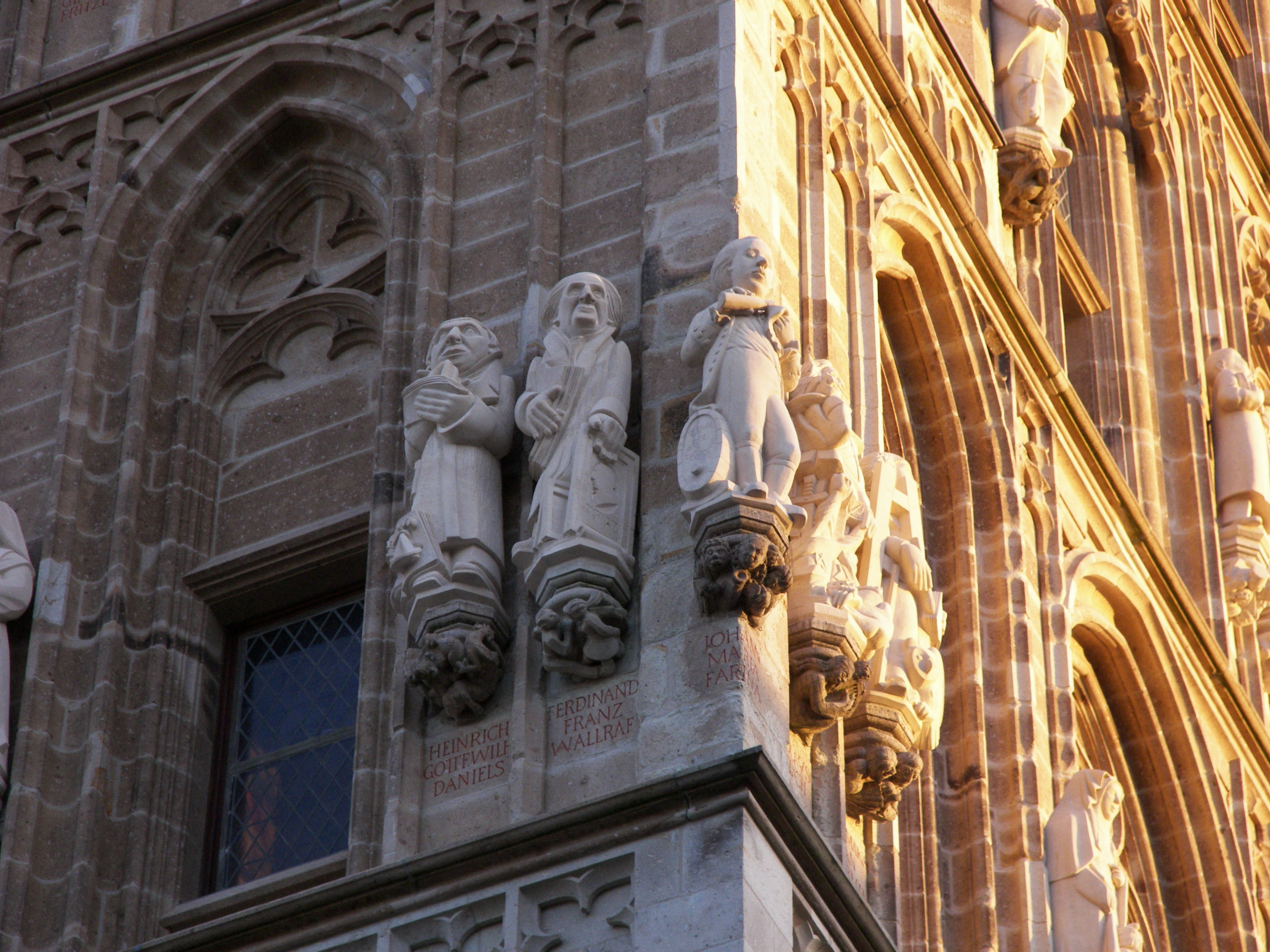
Statue of Johann Maria Farina in the Cologne Town Hall

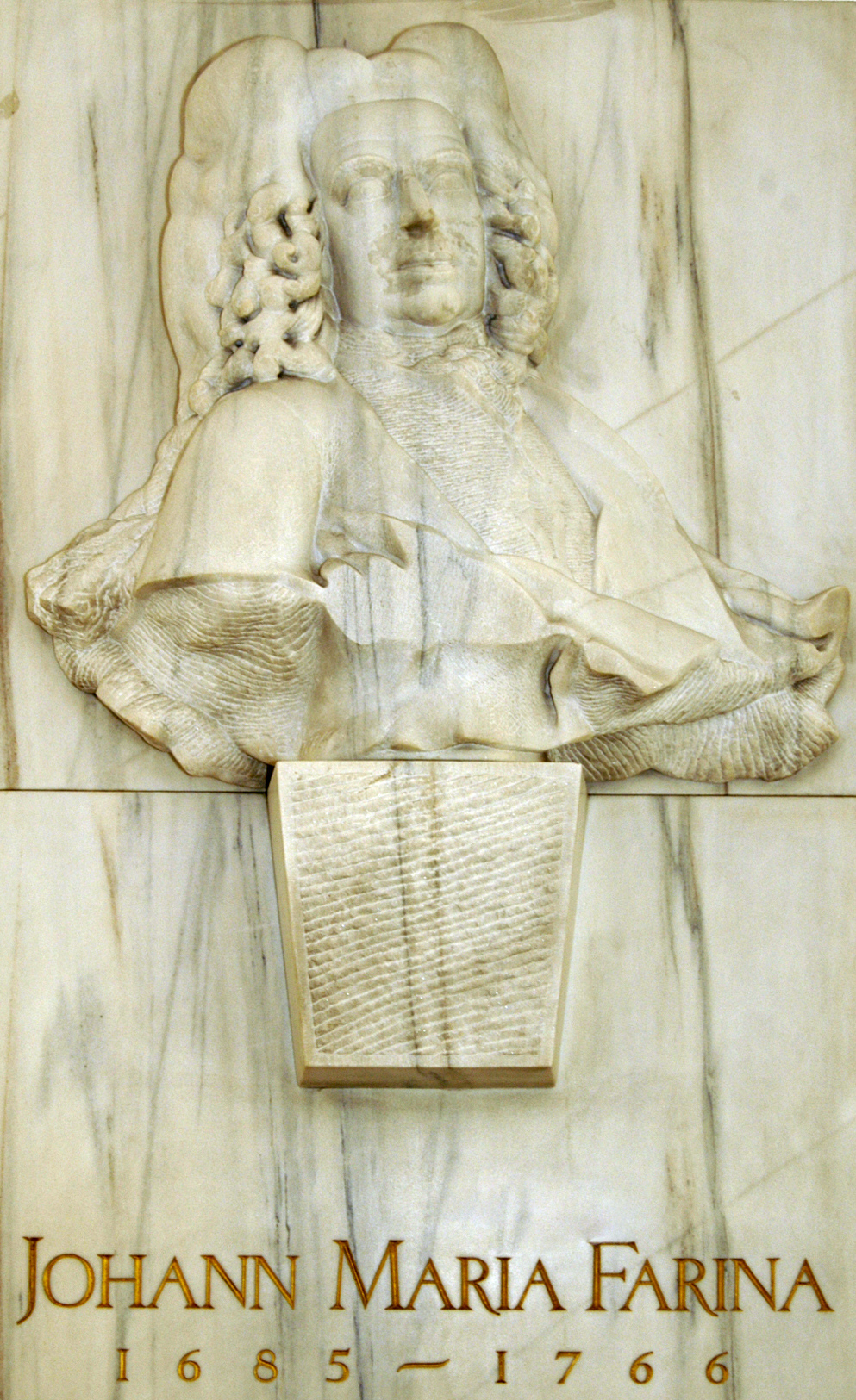
Johann Maria Farina

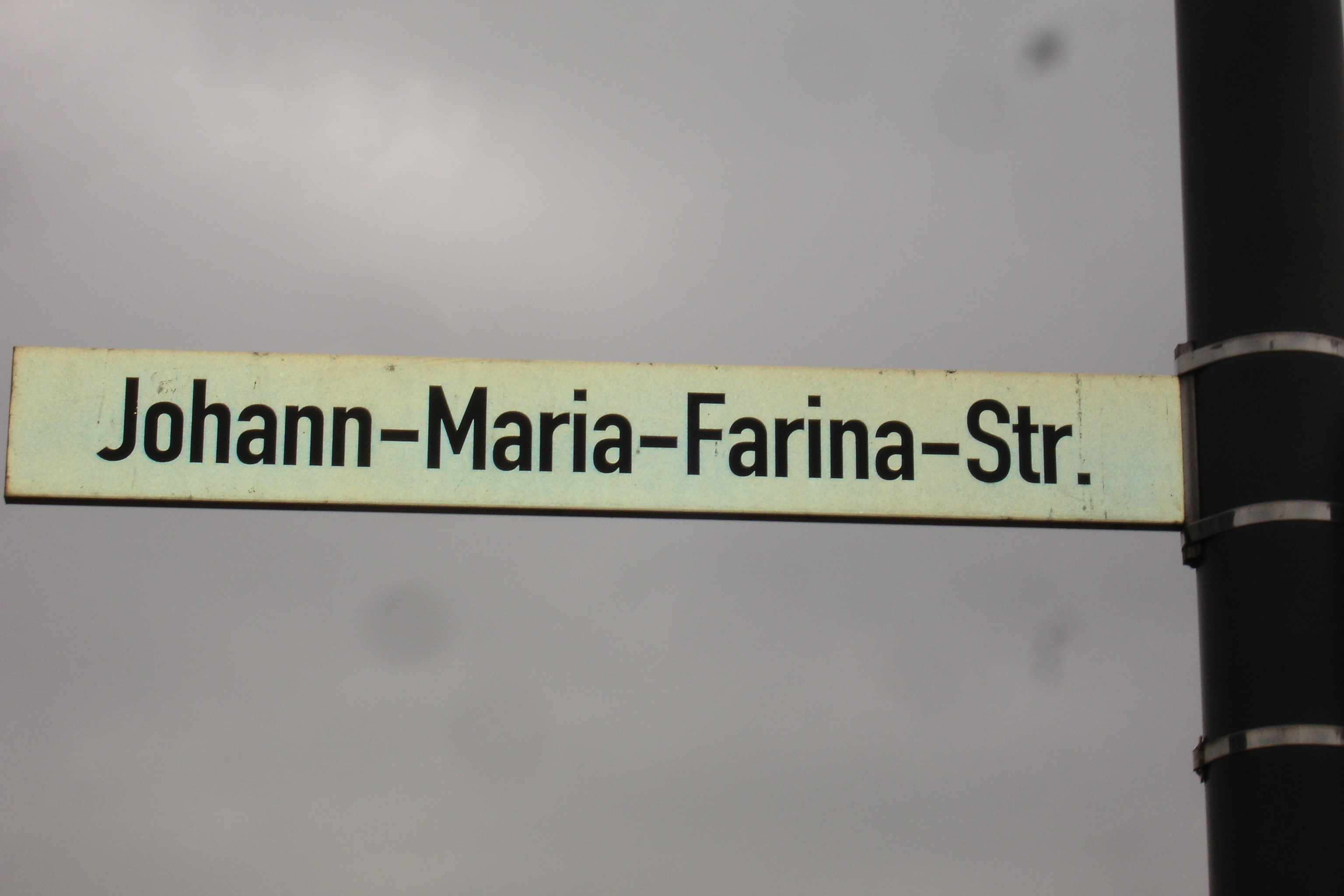
Johann Maria Farina Street in Cologne

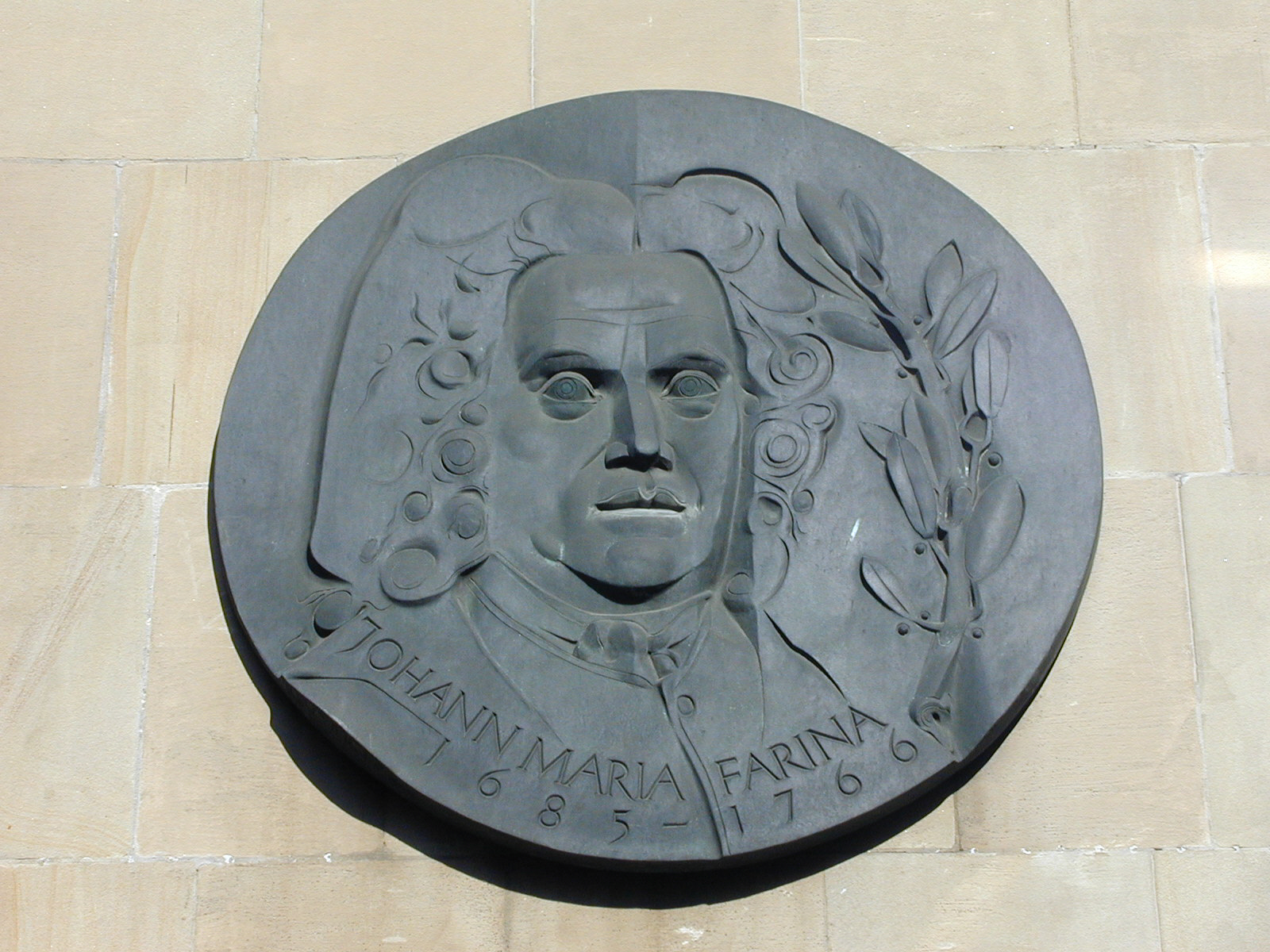
Bronze of Johann Maria Farina

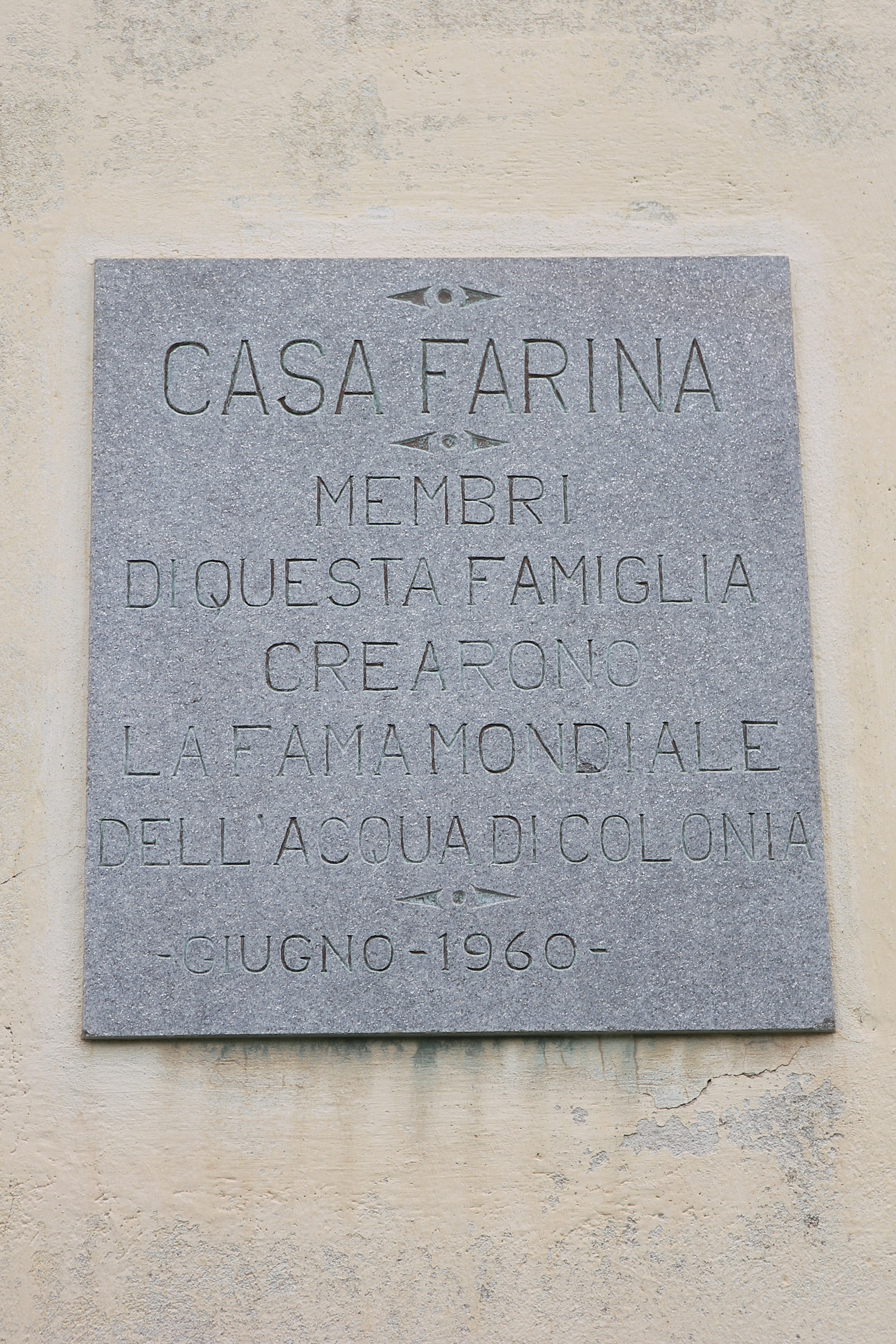
Casa Farina in Santa Maria Maggiore

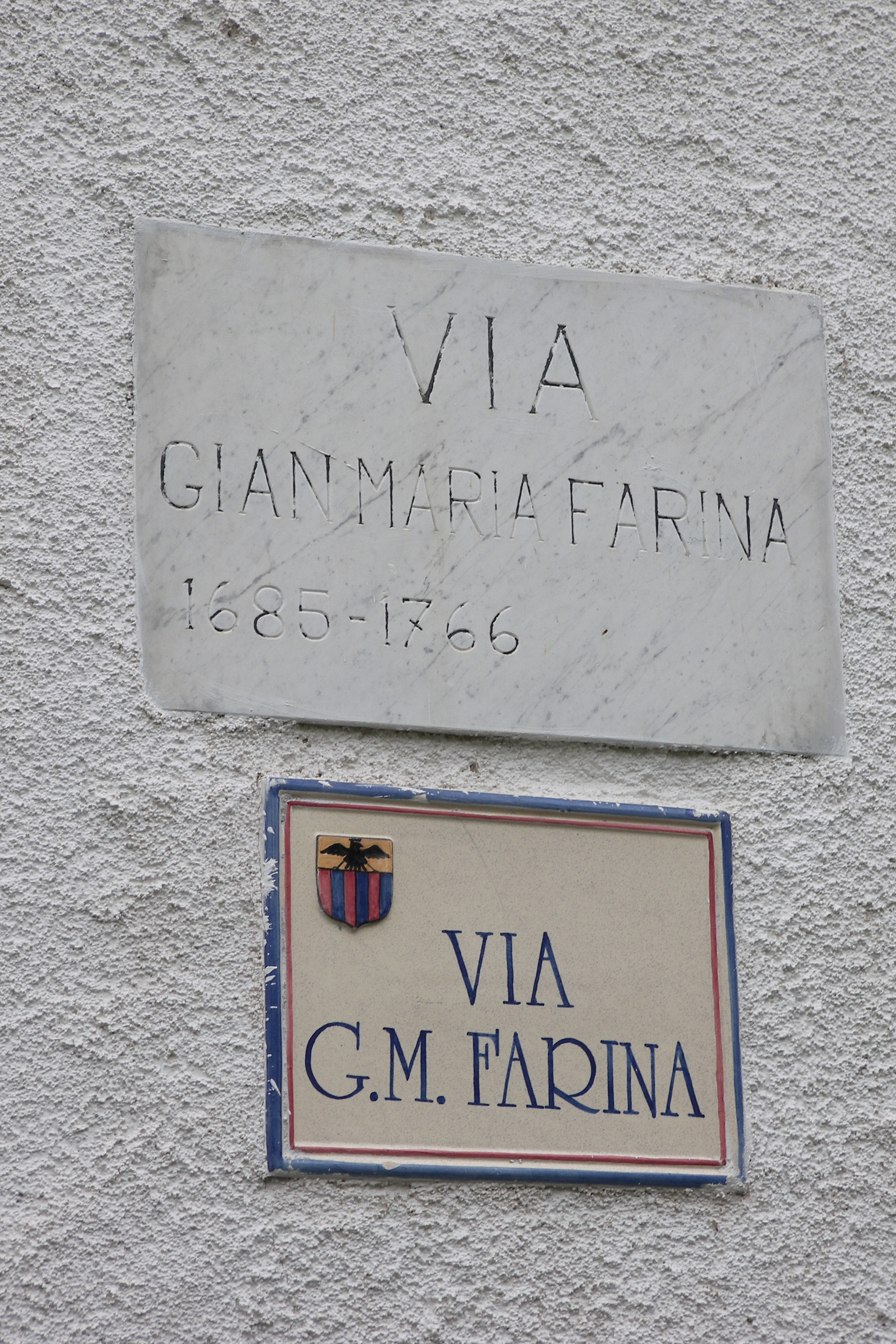
Via G.M.Farina in Santa Maria Maggiore

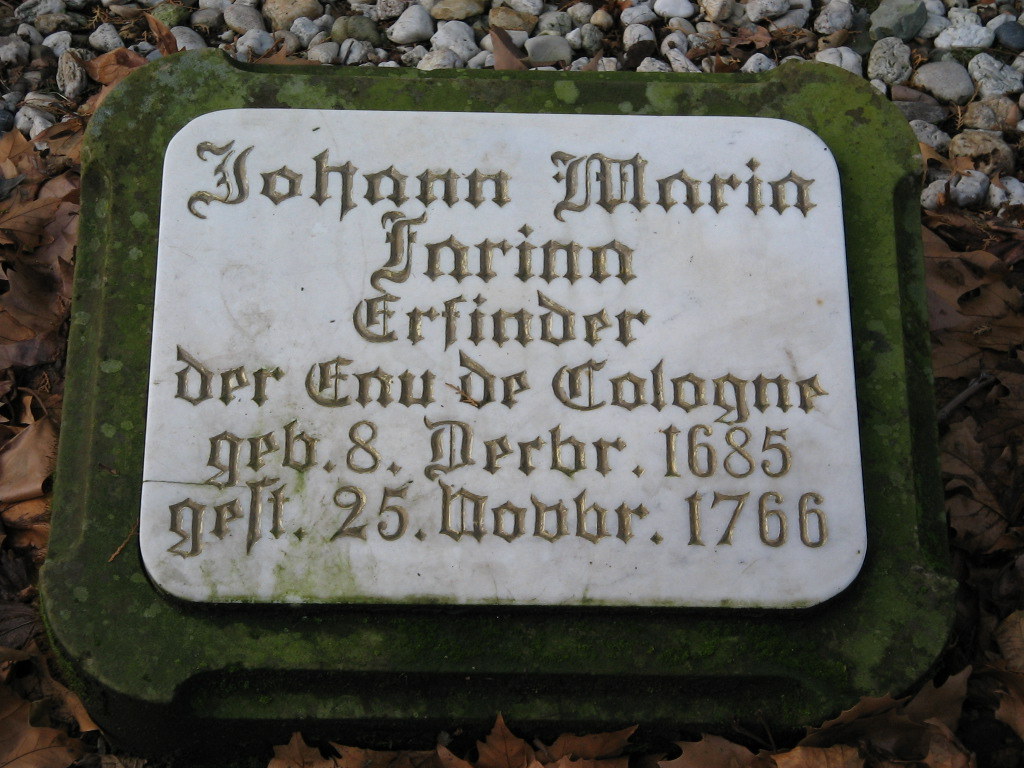
Gravestone of Johann Maria Farina in the Melaten-Friedhof cemetery in Cologne

== See also ==
- Johann Maria Farina gegenüber dem Jülichs-Platz
