= Fragrance Museum =

Museum in Cologne, Germany

Coordinates: 50.938°N 6.958°E

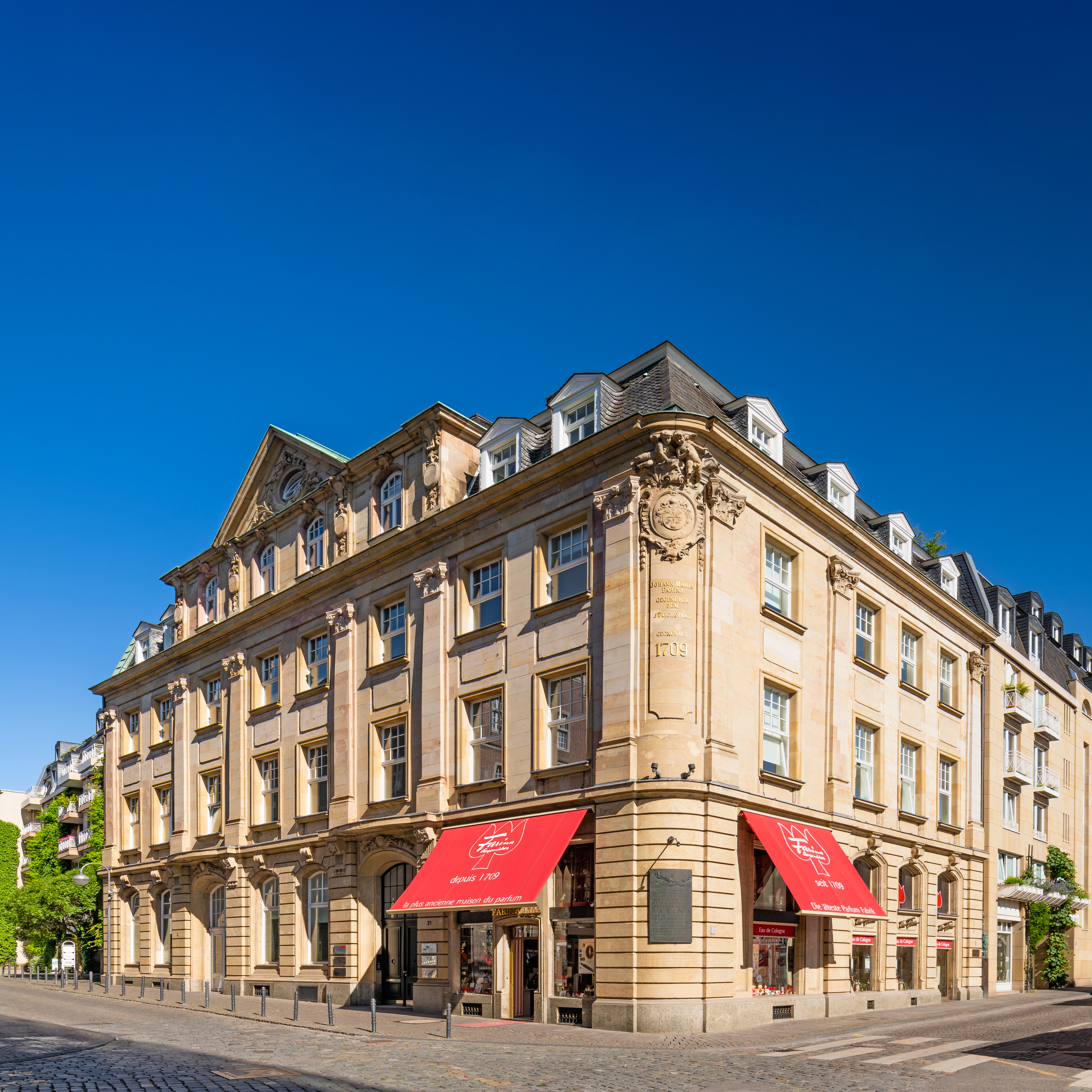
- Exterior view of Fragrance Museum
- Established: 1709
- Location: Cologne, Germany
- Public transit access: 5 Rathaus
- Website: http://www.farina.org/

The Farina Fragrance Museum is situated across from Cologne City Hall, and near the famous Wallraf-Richartz-Museum in the Obenmarspforten in Innenstadt, Cologne. Founded in 1709, John Maria Farina opposite the Jülichs Place is the oldest fragrance factory still standing and houses the registered office since 1723.

Over several floors, the museum provides a very detailed insight into the production methods of perfume throughout the various stages. The focus is primarily laid on Eau de Cologne, and one will therefore discover some particular technical devices such as distillation apparatus which were once used. In addition to the equipment, one will also be able to witness the evolution thanks to various pictures and documents which help trace back history. Moreover, as copyright didn't exist in those days, a great deal of imitations and forgeries of Eau de Cologne rapidly appeared on the market and a certain number of them are also presented in the museum. Further details as to the changes in the manufacturing of Farina Eau de Cologne are also on display. In the museum's boutique, visitors can purchase authentic perfume.

On 25 November 2006, in commemoration of John Maria Farina's 240th death anniversary, the Farina House was elected “place to be” within the context of the project “Germany Land to be”.

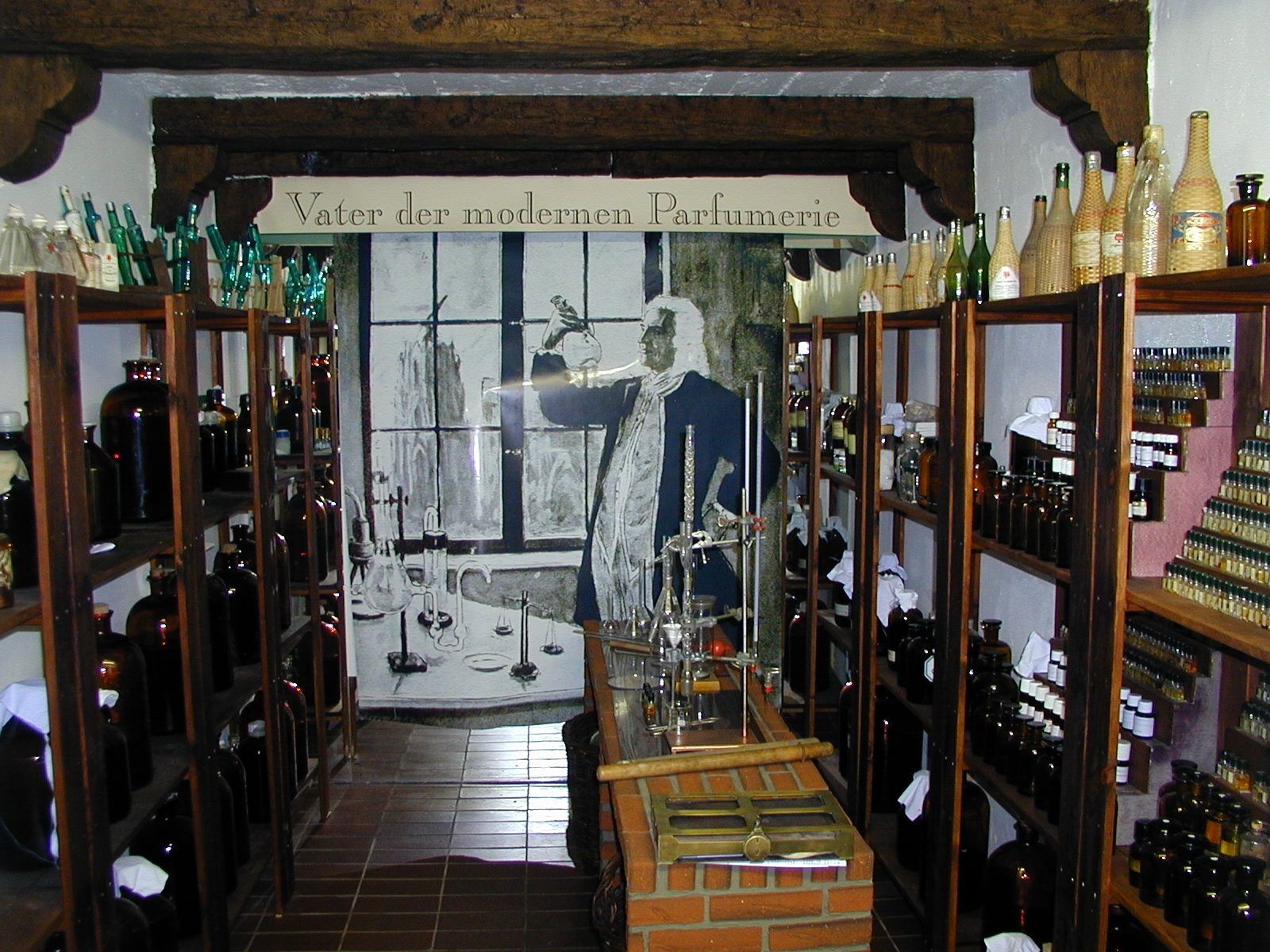
In the museum cellars

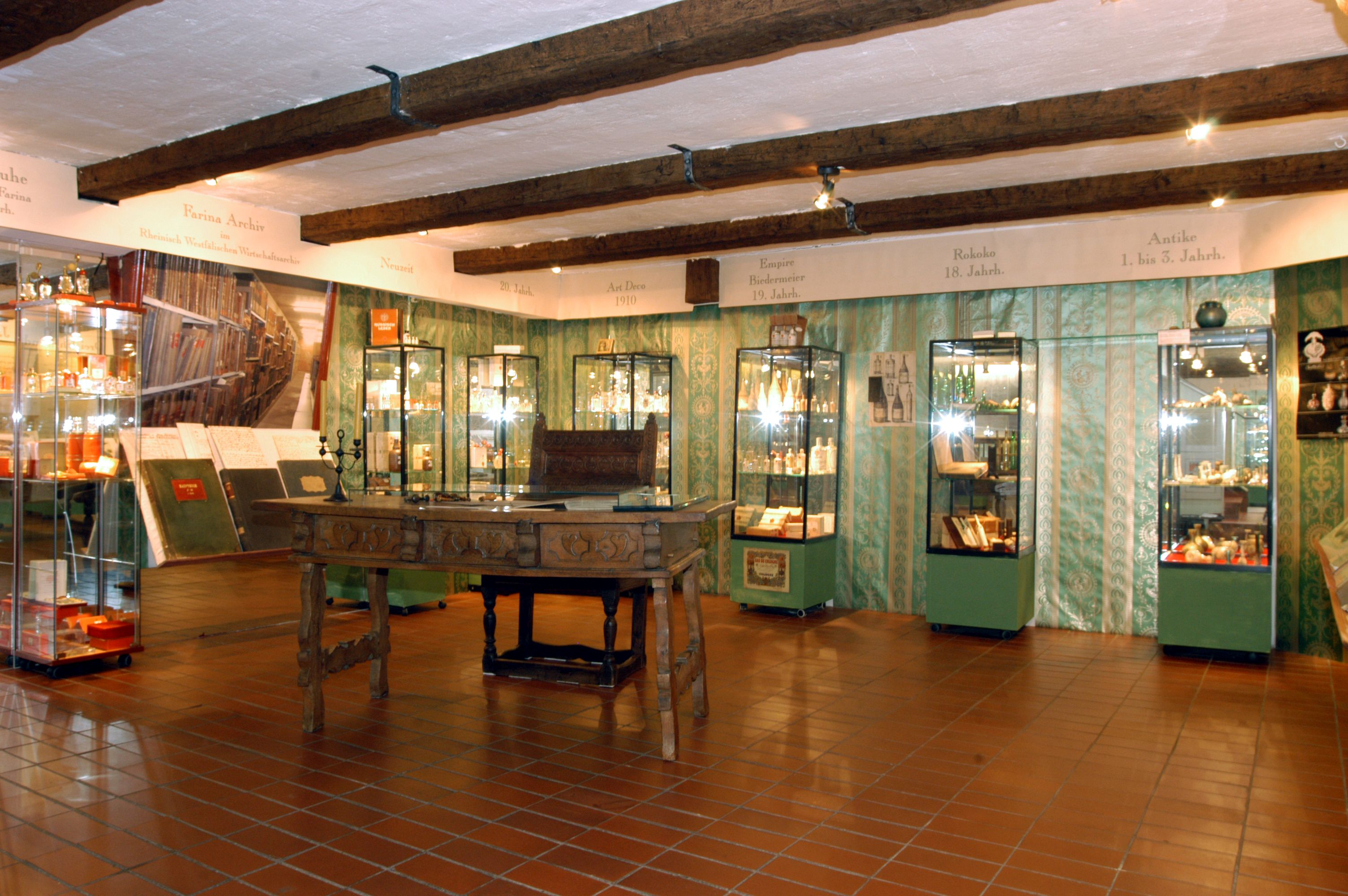
Glass cases; Desks from 1723; museum cellars

== See also ==
- List of museums in Cologne
