= Chanel Chance =

Fragrance line from Chanel

Fragrance by Jacques Polge
- Released: September 2002
- Label: Chanel

Chanel Chance is a line of fragrances for women from Chanel that was introduced in September 2002. It was created by Jacques Polge, who has created every Chanel fragrance launched since 1978, including Coco Mademoiselle, Allure, Bleu de Chanel and Chanel No.5 Eau Premiere.

Unlike all other Chanel fragrances, which are square-shaped bottles packaged in black and white or beige, the Chance bottles are circular and packaged in different colors. The line consists of Chance Eau de Toilette, Chance Parfum, Chance Eau de Parfum, Chance Eau Fraiche, Chance Eau Tendre, Chance Eau Vive and Chanel Eau Splendide.

== Chance Eau de Toilette, Parfum and Eau de Parfum ==
Chance Eau de Toilette is the first fragrance in the line. It is a floral scent, the top notes of which include citron and pink pepper, the heart notes - jasmine absolute, iris absolute and hyacinth; the base notes - amber patchouli, white musk and vetiver. Chance Parfum was released the same year, right after Chance Eau de Toilette. Its top notes consist of ambrette, citron, jasmine absolute; the heart notes are iris absolute, hyacinth. White musk, amber patchouli, fresh vetiver and vanilla belong to the base notes. Chance Eau de Parfum was released in 2005 and it is also floral with the same notes as in Chance Parfum.

== Chance Eau Fraiche ==
Chance Eau Fraiche, first marketed in 2007, comes from a floral family. Its top notes include citron and pink pepper; the heart notes are composed of iris absolute, jasmine absolute and hyacinth; the base notes are white musk, amber patchouli, vetiver and teak wood.

== Chance Eau Tendre ==
Chance Eau Tendre, concentration of which is 'eau de toilette', was first launched in 2010. It is a floral scent, top notes of which are based on grapefruit and quince; iris absolute and hyacinth are included in the heart notes; the base notes consist of amber, white musk, cedar wood.

In 2019 Chanel launched a new fragrance - Chance Eau Tendre Eau de Parfum. A new 'Chance' was created by Olivier Polge, the son of Jacques Polge. The new version of the fragrance is more intense and feminine. The floral heart is formed by exotic absolute jasmine, rose essence and creamy musk. It is also complemented by grapefruit and quince notes.

== Chance Eau Vive ==
This floral scent with 'eau de toilette' concentration was released in 2015. It was created by perfumer Olivier Polge. The top notes of Chance Eau Vive are composed of grapefruit and orange, the heart notes – jasmine and musk, the base notes - vetiver, cedar, iris.

== Chance Eau Splendide ==
Created by Chanel’s master perfumer Olivier Polge, this fragrance embodies a more fruity tone, playing on notes of raspberry accord, rose geranium and amber.

== Advertising ==
The French fashion house's 'Chance Eau Vive' advertisement was created by the French graphic designer Jean-Paul Goude, who has worked with the brand since 1990. He has collaborated with such fragrance campaigns as Egoiste, Coco, Eau Vive and No.5 and with other brands including Kenzo and Shiseido. The commercial shows models, dressed in pastel sweaters, crop tops and hoop skirts, Cindy Bruna, Romy Schonberger, Rianne van Rompaey and Sigrid Agren bowling where the pins and balls are perfume bottles. The individual shots, in which the models are seen through oversized and transparent bottles covering their faces, were also photographed by Goude.

In 2018, Chanel launched a Chance fragrance campaign as a series of mini-films created for Instagram. Directed by Eva Michon and produced by B-Reel Films, the campaign featured four emerging talents—Selah Marley, Lily Newmark, Belen Chavanne, and Angela Yuen—each representing a different variation of the Chance fragrance (Eau Vive, Chance, Eau Tendre, and Eau Fraîche). Shot vertically on location in Venice, Italy, the series was presented as visual diaries through a circular lens, echoing the iconic bottle shape and the theme "Choose Your Chance". The campaign, which won a Silver Clio Award in the Social Media category.

For the 2019 Chance Eau Tendre Eau de Parfum campaign, Jean-Paul Goude partnered with choreographer Ryan Heffington, musician Sam Spiegel and models Abby Champion, Camille Hurel, Rianne Van Rompaey and Ysaunny Brito. The video depicts these four models performing a choreographed dance at an audition because they have been chosen to take part in the campaign.

For the 2025 Chance Eau Splendide campaign, Belgian singer Angèle is the new face of the brand. In a short film accompanying the launch, the singer plays hide and seek with the floating perfume bottle in a mirrored funhouse. After playing catch-up with “Eau Splendide,” she finally grabs the bottle and joins a group of models that dance with the scent. The short film was directed by Jean-Pierre Jeunet and a new song was released as theme song by Angèle called "A little more".
