= Egoist (disambiguation) =

An egoist is an adherent of a philosophy of egoism.

Egoist may also refer to:

- Egotist, a person who believes in their own importance or superiority
- An adherent of egoist anarchism
- Egoist (band), a Japanese pop duo 2011–2023
- "Egoist" (Falco song), 1998
- "Egoist" (Kent song), 2016
- "Egoist", a song by Loona from Olivia Hye, 2018
- Egoist, a 2023 Japanese film starring Ryohei Suzuki and Hio Miyazawa

== See also ==
- Egoista (disambiguation)
- Égoïste, a perfume
- Égoïste (magazine), a French magazine
- The Egoist (disambiguation)
- The Egoists, a 2011 Japanese film
- The Egoists (Gli egoisti), a 1959 novel by Bonaventura Tecchi
