= Bleu de Chanel =

Men's fragrance by Chanel

- Eau de toilette concentration of Bleu de Chanel

Fragrance by
- Category: Woody aromatic
- Designed for: Men
- Top notes: Lemon; mint; pink pepper; grapefruit; citrus
- Heart notes: Ginger; Iso E Super; nutmeg; jasmine
- Base notes: Labdanum; sandalwood; patchouli; vetiver; incense; cedar; white musk
- Released: September 13, 2010; 15 years ago
- Label: Chanel
- Perfumer(s): Jacques Polge
- Concentration: Eau de Toilette; Eau de Parfum; Parfum; Extrait de parfum
- Tagline: "Be unexpected"
- Website: Official website

Bleu de Chanel (literally translated as "Chanel's Blue" or "Blue Chanel") is a men's fragrance created by Jacques Polge for French fashion house Chanel in 2010. It was the first men's fragrance released by the brand since Allure Homme Sport in 2004, and the first men's masterbrand introduced since Égoïste in 1990. The original fragrance is an eau de toilette; the 2014 eau de parfum version was also formulated by Jacques Polge, and the 2018 parfum version was formulated by his son Olivier Polge. French actor Gaspard Ulliel was the first ambassador for Bleu de Chanel and remained as the face of the fragrance for twelve years, until his death in January 2022. He was succeeded by actors Timothée Chalamet in 2023–2026 and Jacob Elordi in 2026.

== Conception and scent ==
Bleu de Chanel is described as a woody aromatic fragrance, which is identified by the combination of "aromatic herbs" and an "opulent center and base." The fragrance contains top notes of lemon, mint, pink pepper, and grapefruit; middle notes of ginger, Iso E Super, nutmeg, and jasmine; and base notes of labdanum, sandalwood, patchouli, vetiver, incense, cedar, and white musk.

== Release and advertising ==
The marketing campaign for Bleu de Chanel was discussed as an example of branded entertainment in the fashion industry.

French actor Gaspard Ulliel was announced as the first face of Bleu de Chanel on February 16, 2010, becoming Chanel's first male ambassador. A television commercial filmed in New York City premiered online on August 25, 2010 and was later released on TV in September 2010. It was directed by Martin Scorsese and starred Ulliel and Ingrid Sophie Schram. In the commercial, Ulliel played a young filmmaker in the middle of a press conference who sees his ex-girlfriend (Schram) among the journalists and reminisces about the past and the beginning of their relationship, until he says: "I'm not going to be the person I'm expected to be anymore", gets up and leaves the room. It also featured The Rolling Stones' song "She Said Yeah".

Chanel's American chief operating officer John Galantic noted that the selection of "the quintessential American film director" Scorsese was intended to create "a product and brand communication uniquely tailored to the American market," where the brand's men's fragrance business was not fully developed. The fragrance hit the stores on September 13, 2010.

On February 5, 2015, a new commercial starring Ulliel was released. Directed by James Gray, it was filmed in Los Angeles and featured Jimi Hendrix's cover of Bob Dylan's "All Along the Watchtower".

British filmmaker Steve McQueen directed a new commercial for Bleu de Chanel released on June 1, 2018. Shot in Bangkok, it also included underwater scenes filmed in London. It featured Ulliel crossing the city looking for a woman (played by German model Nur Hellmann) he saw in a building in front of his while David Bowie's "Starman" plays in the background.

Ulliel was the face of Bleu de Chanel for 12 years, up until his death on January 19, 2022. When he died, Chanel's official Instagram and Facebook pages shared a tribute to him. Chanel also paid tribute to Ulliel during their Spring/Summer 2022 Haute Couture show at Paris Fashion Week on 25 January 2022. A model dressed as a bride finished the show by carrying a bouquet of camellias—Coco Chanel's favorite flower—tinted midnight blue as a nod to Ulliel and the Bleu de Chanel perfume.

On 2 June 2022, Chanel released the first commercial for Bleu de Chanel without Gaspard Ulliel. In the new commercial titled "Instinctive and Electric", a drummer –played by musician Vincent Girault aka De La Romance– plays along with "Fire" by Jimi Hendrix while lights throughout the city start to flicker to the beat and a mysterious woman shows him the city. In May 2023, Chanel announced that actor Timothée Chalamet was to be the new ambassador for Bleu de Chanel. In 2026, Chalamet was succeeded by Jacob Elordi.

== Sales ==
Bleu de Chanel was a top Christmas seller for American luxury department store Bloomingdale's in 2010, and also the chain's biggest men's fragrance premiere ever. It was the second best-selling men fragrance between January and October 2011, and between January and August 2012 according to The NPD Group. In 2016, it was the third best-selling men fragrance. In June 2021, British retailer The Fragrance Shop revealed that Bleu de Chanel was the second most popular fragrance in Britain.

== Awards ==
Year	Ceremony	Award	Result	Ref.
2011	Fragrance Foundation Awards	Best New Male Fragrance	Won	
2015	Canadian Fragrance Awards	Best Full-Market Launch – Men's	Won	
2019	Fragrance Foundation Awards	Fragrance of the Year – Men's Luxury	Won	
2019	Fragrance Foundation Awards	Media Campaign of the Year – Men's	Won	
