= The Egoist =

The Egoist may refer to:

- The Egoist (periodical), a 1914–1919 London literary magazine
- The Egoist (novel), an 1879 novel by George Meredith

== See also ==
- The Egoists, a 2011 Japanese drama film
- The Egoists (Gli egoisti), a 1959 novel by Bonaventura Tecchi
- Egoist (disambiguation)
