= C12H16O4 =

The molecular formula C_{12}H_{16}O_{4} (molar mass: 224.26 g/mol, exact mass: 224.1049 u) may refer to:

- Olivetolic acid
- Pogostone
- 2,4,5-Trimethoxypropiophenone
