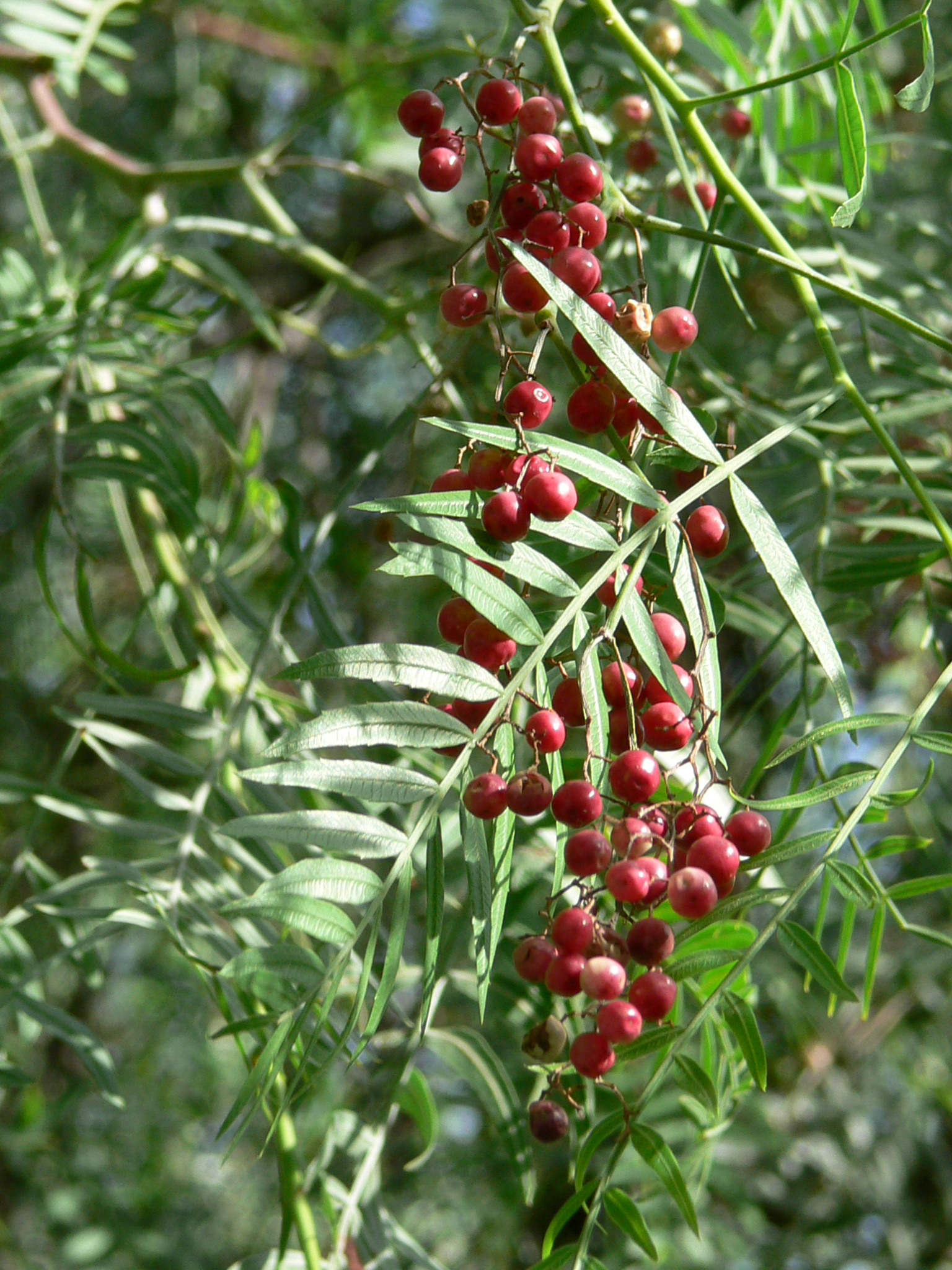

Conservation status
- Least Concern (IUCN 3.1)

Scientific classification
- Kingdom: Plantae
- Clade: Embryophytes
- Clade: Tracheophytes
- Clade: Spermatophytes
- Clade: Angiosperms
- Clade: Eudicots
- Clade: Rosids
- Order: Sapindales
- Family: Anacardiaceae
- Genus: Schinus
- Species: S. molle

Binomial name
- Schinus molle L.

= Schinus molle =

Species of tree

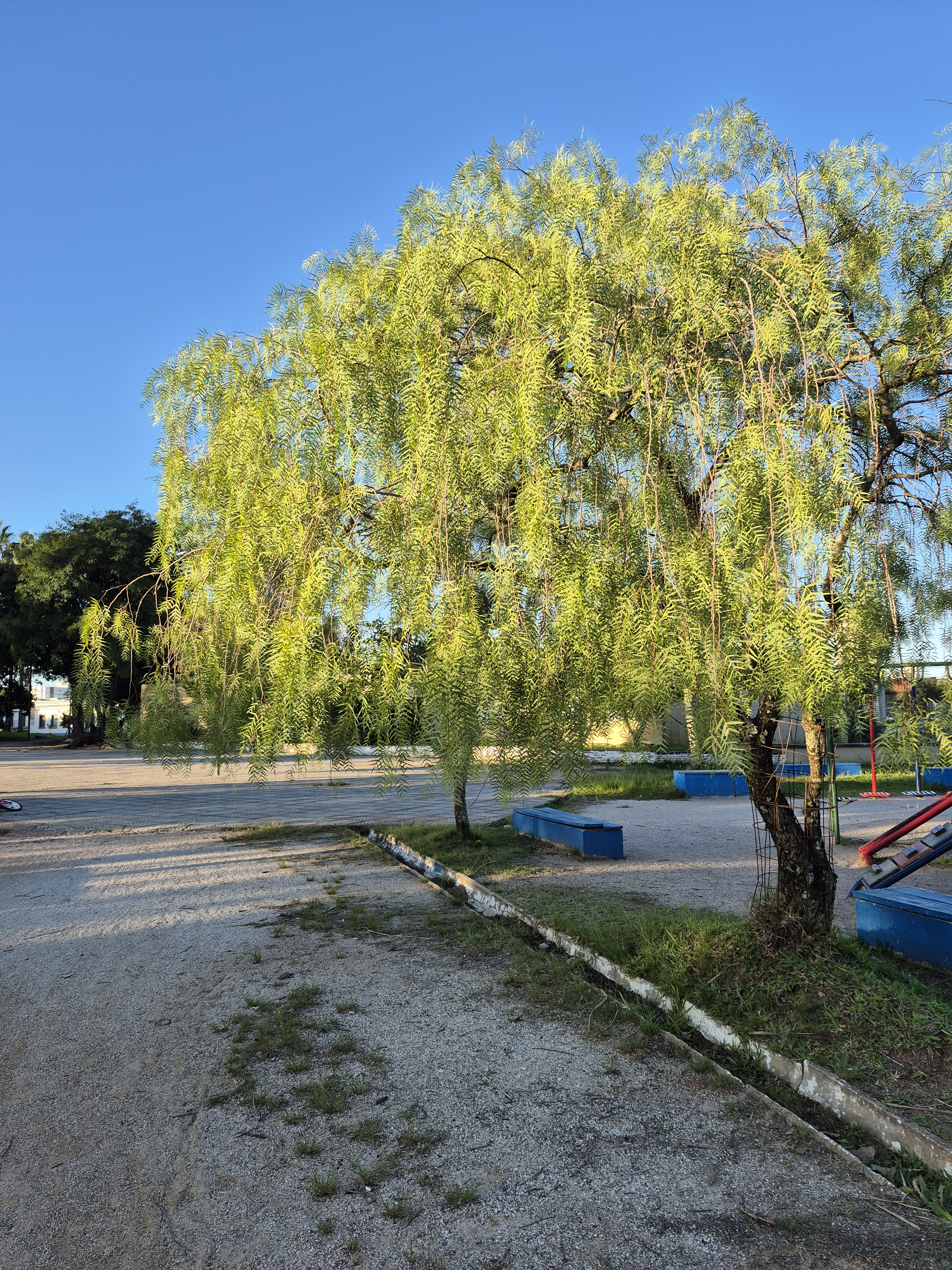
Tree in Brazil, with no fruits or flowers

Schinus molle (Peruvian pepper, also known as American pepper, Peruvian peppertree, escobilla, false pepper, rosé pepper, molle del Peru, pepper tree, peppercorn tree, California pepper tree, pirul, Peruvian mastic, anacahuita or aguaribay and pepperina) is an evergreen tree in the cashew family (Anacardiaceae) that grows to 15 m (50 ft). It is native to an area from the Peruvian Andes to southern Brazil. The bright pink fruits of S. molle are often sold as "pink peppercorns", although it is unrelated to black pepper (Piper nigrum). The word molle in Schinus molle comes from mulli, the Quechua word for the tree. The tree is host to the pepper-tree moth, Bombycomorpha bifascia.

== Description ==
Schinus molle is a quick growing evergreen tree that grows up to 15 m (50 ft) tall and wide. It is the largest of all Schinus species and potentially the longest lived. The upper branches of the tree tend to droop. The tree's pinnately compound leaves measure 8–25 cm long × 4–9 cm wide and are made up of 19–41 alternate leaflets. Male and female flowers occur on separate plants (dioecious). Flowers are small, white and borne profusely in panicles at the ends of the drooping branches. The fruit are 5–7 mm diameter round drupes with woody seeds that turn from green to red, pink or purplish, carried in dense clusters of hundreds of berries that can be present year round. The rough grayish bark is twisted and drips sap. The bark, leaves and berries are aromatic when crushed.

== Distribution ==
Schinus molle is native to the arid zone of northern South America and Peru's Andean deserts, extending to central Argentina and central Chile. It has, however, become widely naturalized around the world. It is known for its strong wood used for saddles, and was one of the Spanish colonies' supply sources for saddles. It has also been used for spice production, but is mainly planted as an ornamental tree.

S. molle is a drought-tolerant, long-lived, hardy evergreen species that has become a serious invasive weed internationally.

In South Africa, for example, S. molle has invaded savanna and grasslands and become naturalized along drainage lines and roadsides in semi-desert. It is also invasive throughout much of Australia in a range of habitats from grasslands to dry open forest and coastal areas, as well as railway sidings and abandoned farms.

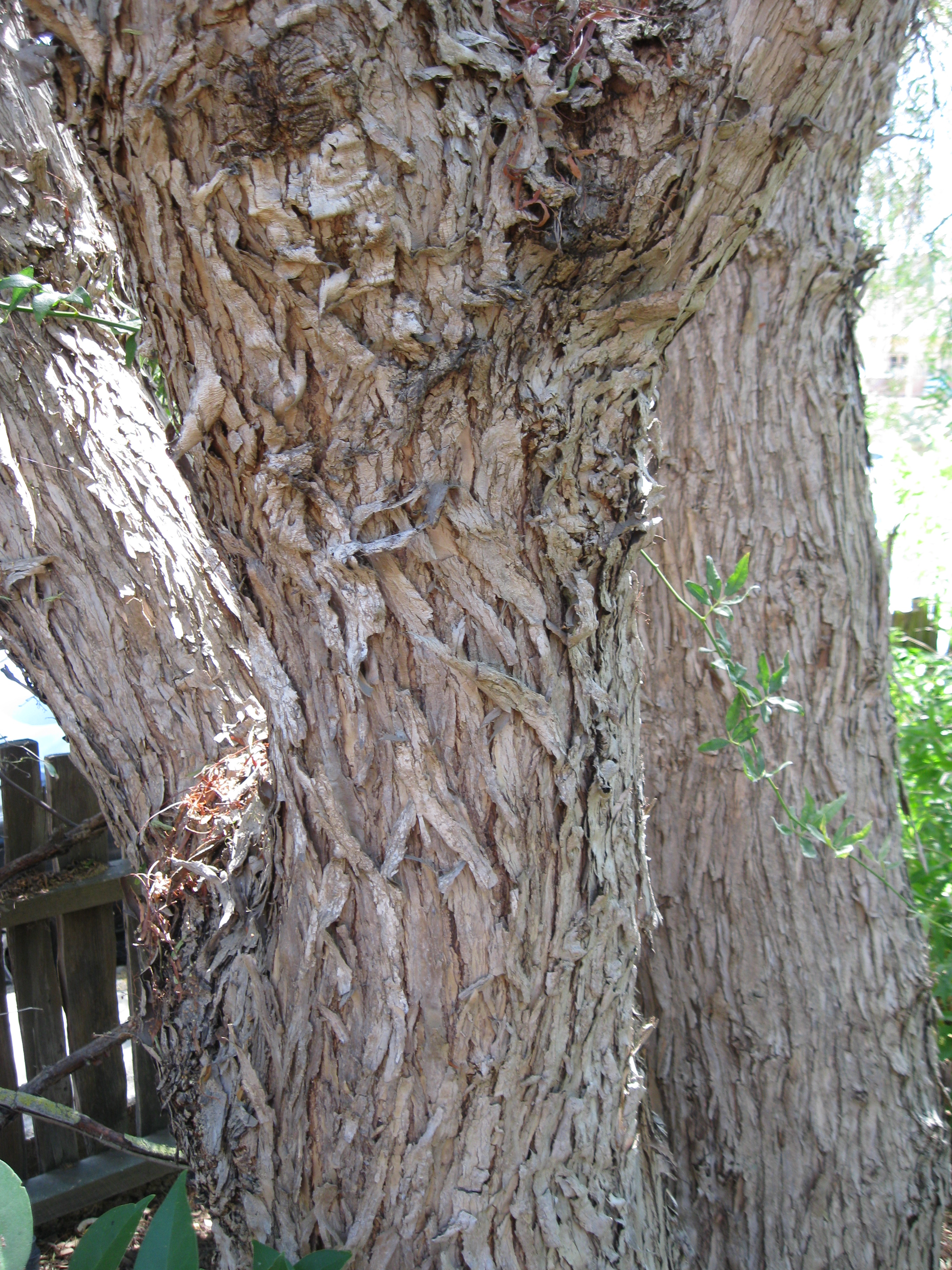
Distinctive bark

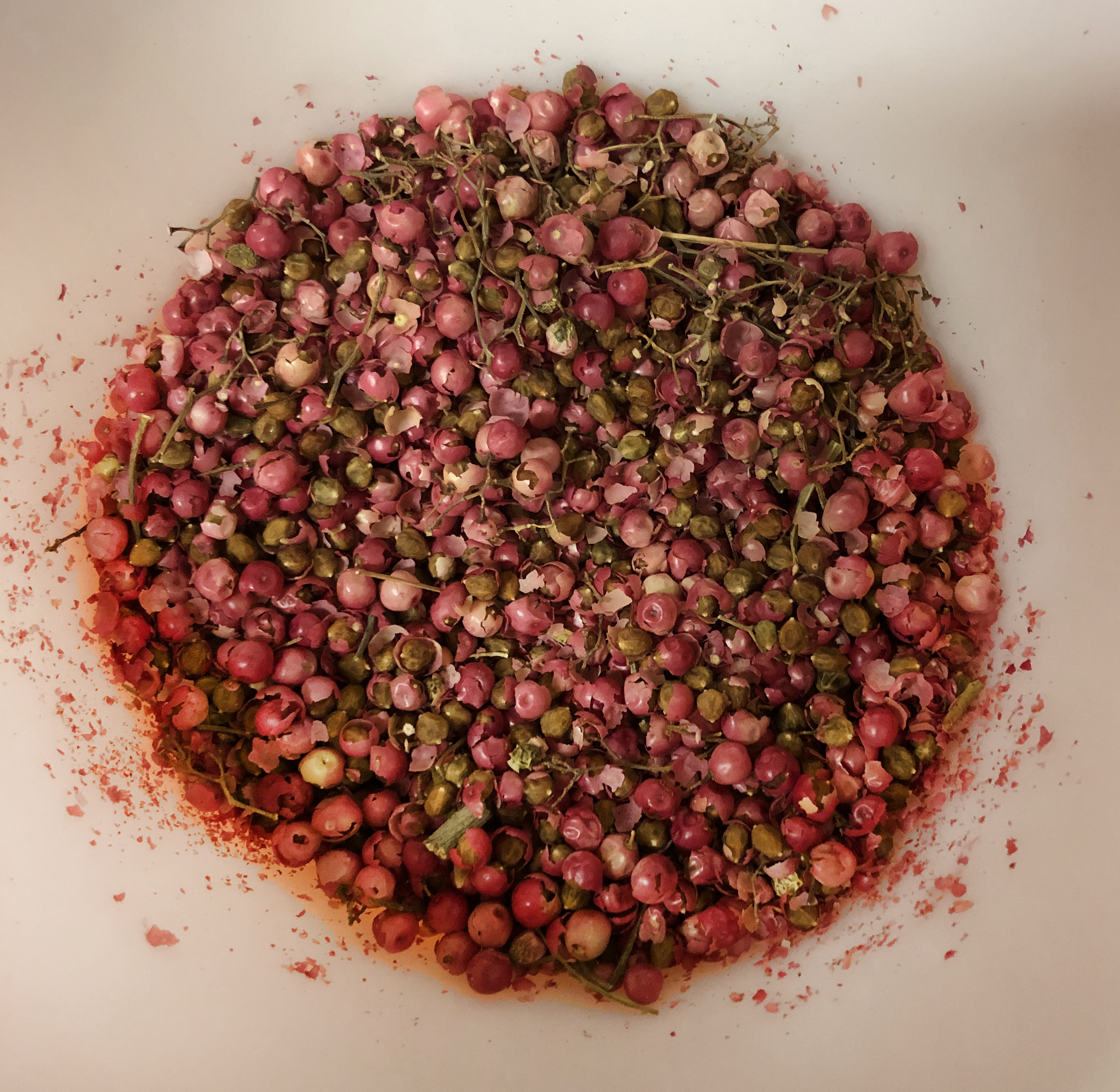
Pink peppercorns – Schinus molle

== Uses ==
=== Culinary ===
Although not related to commercial pepper (Piper nigrum) the pink/red berries are sold as pink peppercorns and often blended with commercial pepper. The fruit and leaves are, however, potentially poisonous to poultry, pigs, and possibly calves. Records also exist of young children who have experienced vomiting and diarrhea after eating the fruit. Presently Schinus molle lacks generally recognized as safe (GRAS) status with the United States Food and Drug Administration.

Extracts of S. molle have been used as a flavor in drinks and syrups.

=== Medicinal ===
In traditional medicine, S. molle was used in treating a variety of wounds and infections due to its antibacterial and antiseptic properties. It has also been used as an antidepressant and diuretic, and for toothache, rheumatism and menstrual disorders, with recent studies in mice providing possible support for its antidepressant effects. It has also been speculated that S. molle's insecticidal properties make it a good candidate for use as an alternative to synthetic chemicals in pest control.

Fresh green leaves in bunches are used shamanically in Mesoamerican traditional ceremonies for cleansings and blessings.

=== Other uses ===
The leaves are also used for the natural dyeing of textiles in the Andean region. This practice dates back to pre-Columbian times. The Incas used the oil from its leaves in early mummification practices to preserve and embalm their dead. Schinus molle is also used as a raw material in perfumery.

=== Historical use ===
There is archaeological evidence that the Wari state of the Middle Horizon (600–1000 AD) used the drupes of S. molle extensively for producing chicha, a fermented alcoholic beverage. Archaeological excavations at the Quilcapampa site in southern Peru, found evidence that the Wari used seeds from the vilca tree (Anadenanthera colubrina) and combined the hallucinogenic drug with chicha.

The Inca used the sweet outer part of ripe fruit to make a drink. Berries were rubbed carefully to avoid mixing with the bitter inner parts, the mix strained and then left for a few days to produce a drink. It was also boiled down for syrup or mixed with maize to make nourishing gruel.

In the late 19th century, S. molle was planted abundantly in California and became known as the "California pepper tree" to many. The tree had romantic associations with the state's Spanish missions – by the 1870s "the pepper tree had become as familiar a visual trope as the padres' sandals and staffs." They were also valued for their shade and their tolerance of semi-arid conditions, and so were planted along new avenues in the cities of Southern California. In 1911, an editorial in the Los Angeles Times celebrated the pepper tree:

"One of the first features to grip the eastern tourist when visiting this favored winter resort is the wonderful feathery foliage and the gorgeous scarlet berries of this matchless shade tree, giving, as it does, a pleasant air of holiday making and a wealth of tropical color to the Californian landscape...Why, the pepper tree has become an integral part of life in the sunny Southland."

However, S. molle fell out of favor as a street tree in the early twentieth century, in part because it hosts black scale, an insect which threatened the citrus groves of Southern California. The trees also tend to break up sidewalks with their roots, produce suckers, and interfere with buried telephone wires and sewer pipes. Many of the oldest trees were uprooted and new street plantings were banned in the citrus colonies. Los Angeles prohibited new street plantings in 1930.

== Cultivation ==
The tree reproduces through seed, suckers and cuttings. The seeds have a particularly hard coat and germination rates are greatly improved after they have passed through the gut of birds or other animals. Seeds germinate in spring, with seedlings slow growing until established. The seeds easily germinate under the tree in the existing leaf litter of the mother tree, by the hundreds at once and can easily be transplanted.
