= Coco (perfume) =

Women's perfume by Chanel

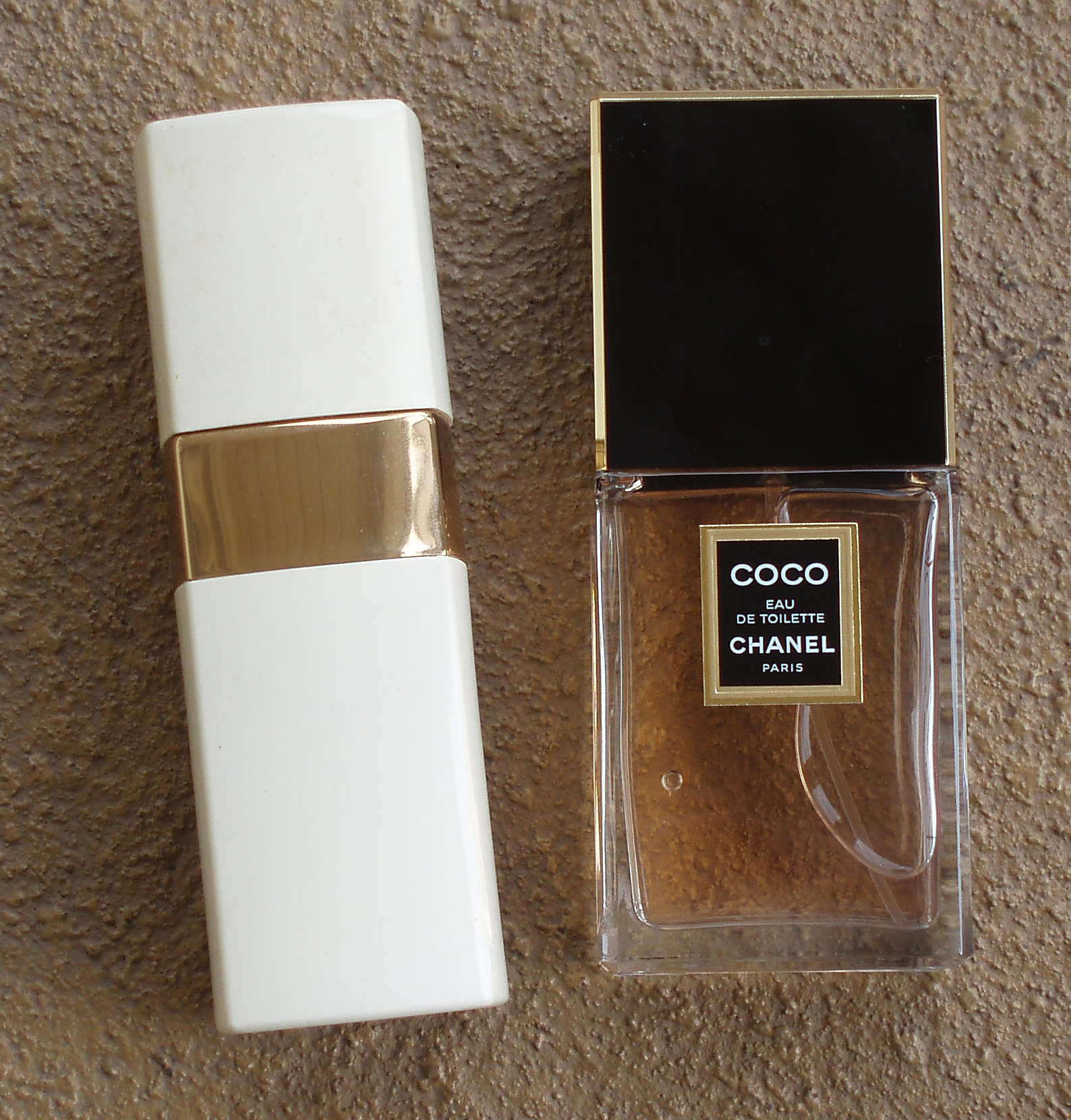

Fragrance by Chanel
- Category: Amber floral
- Designed for: Women
- Top notes: Mandarin
- Heart notes: Jasmine; Ylang-Ylang; Orange Blossom
- Base notes: Patchouli; Tonka Bean; Benzoin
- Released: 1984; 42 years ago
- Label: Chanel
- Perfumer(s): Jacques Polge
- Concentration: Eau de Parfum
- Successor: Coco Mademoiselle (2001)
- Website: Official website

Coco is a women's perfume by French fashion house Chanel, introduced in 1984. It was created by Chanel in-house perfumer Jacques Polge.

== Marketing ==
In 1991, French actress, model and singer Vanessa Paradis starred in a commercial for the fragrance covered in black feathers, portraying a bird swinging in a cage. The advert, entitled "L'esprit de Chanel" ("The spirit of Chanel"), was shot by Jean-Paul Goude.
