= Patchoulol =

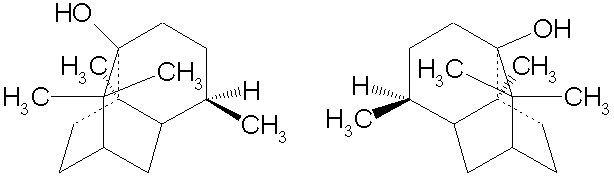

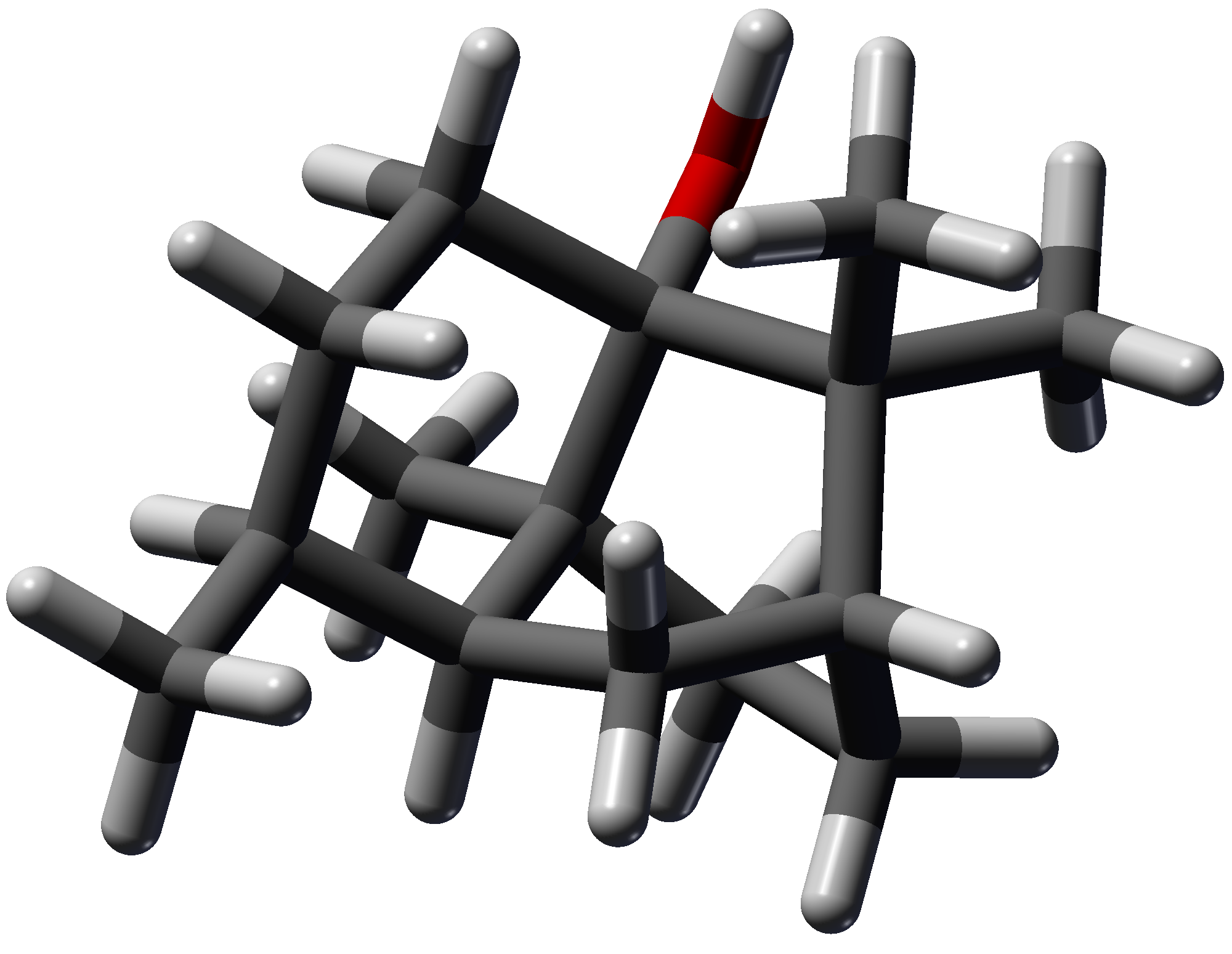

Names
- Preferred IUPAC name (1R,4S,4aS,6R,8aS)-4,8a,9,9-Tetramethyldecahydro-1,6-methanonaphthalen-1-ol
- Other names Patchouli camphor; (−)-Patchoulol; (1R,3R,6S,7S,8S)-Patchoulol; Patchouli alcohol

Identifiers
CAS Number	5986-55-0
3D model (JSmol)	Interactive image
ChEBI	CHEBI:7940
ChemSpider	9130391
ECHA InfoCard	100.025.279
EC Number	227-807-2
KEGG	C09705
PubChem CID	10955174
UNII	HHH8CPR1M2
CompTox Dashboard (EPA)	DTXSID9052266
- InChI: InChI=1S/C15H26O/c1-10-5-8-15(16)13(2,3)11-6-7-14(15,4)12(10)9-11/h10-12,16H,5-9H2,1-4H3/t10-,11+,12-,14-,15+/m0/s1 Key: GGHMUJBZYLPWFD-CUZKYEQNSA-N
- SMILES: O[C@@]23CC[C@@H]([C@@H]1C[C@@H](CC[C@@]12C)C3(C)C)C

Properties
Chemical formula	C_{15}H_{26}O
Molar mass	222.36
Appearance	white solid
Density	1.0284 g/mL
Melting point	56 °C (133 °F; 329 K) (racemic)
Boiling point	287–288 °C (549–550 °F; 560–561 K)
Solubility in water	practically insoluble
Solubility in ethanol	soluble
Solubility in diethyl ether	soluble
Refractive index (n_{D})	1.5029

Hazards
Safety data sheet (SDS)	External MSDS
- Except where otherwise noted, data are given for materials in their standard state (at 25 °C [77 °F], 100 kPa). verify (what is ?) Infobox references

Patchoulol or patchouli alcohol (C_{15}H_{26}O) is a sesquiterpene alcohol found in patchouli (Pogostemon cablin). Patchouli oil is an important material in perfumery. The (−)-optical isomer is one of the organic compounds responsible for the typical patchouli scent. Patchoulol is obtained industrially from patchouli leaf fermentation.

Patchoulol is also used in the synthesis of the chemotherapy drug Taxol.

== Structure determination ==
Gal first isolated patchouli alcohol in 1869, and Montgolfier later formulated its chemical composition (correctly) as C_{15}H_{26}O. Early structural investigation soon established the presence of a saturated tricyclic tertiary alcohol. After several years of careful degradation study, Büchi and co-workers proposed in 1961 that patchouli alcohol had the structure 1. A subsequent synthesis of material which corresponded to an authentic sample of natural patchouli alcohol appeared to verify Büchi's proposal.

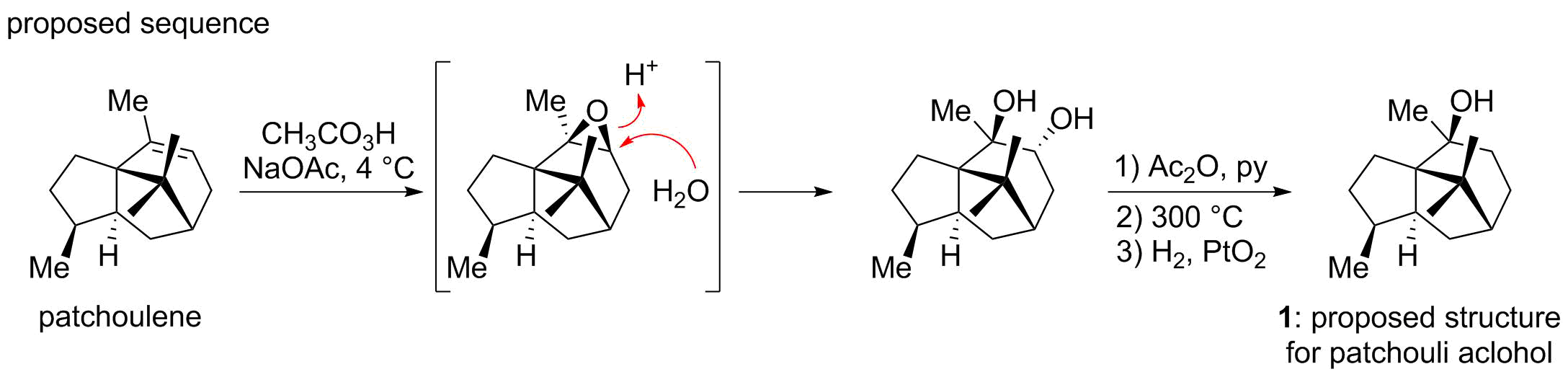
Proposed sequence for the synthesis of patchouli alcohol.

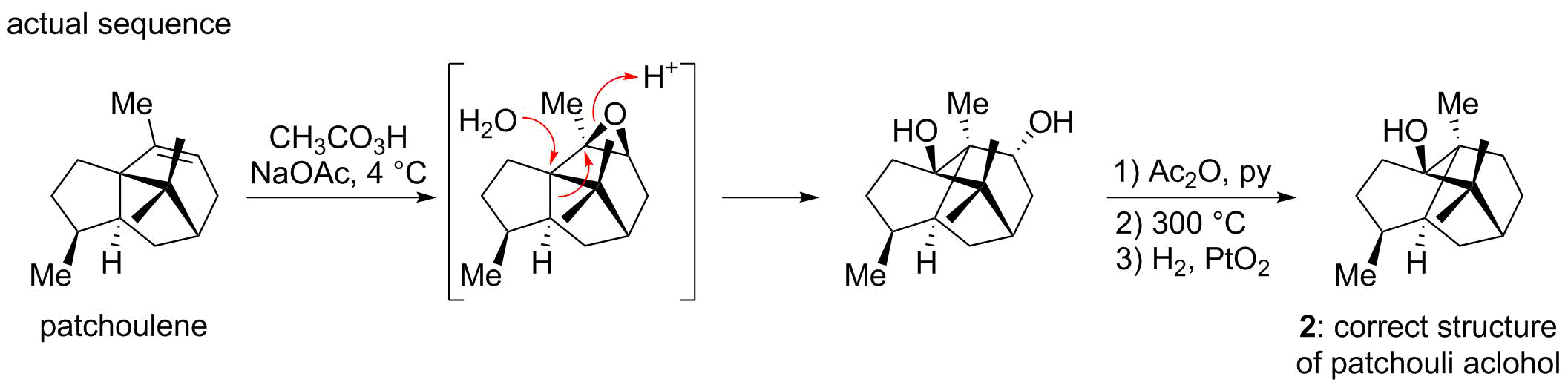
Actual sequence for the synthesis of patchouli alcohol. Contains embedded bicyclo[2.2.2]octane motif.

However, Dunitz and co-workers serendipitously discovered in 1963 that Büchi's structure is in fact incorrect. Dunitz et al. had undertaken X-ray analysis of the patchouli alcohol diester with chromic acid, intending to determine the Cr-O-C angles. In the course of their analysis they could not reconcile the X-ray evidence with the "known" structure 1. In a joint paper with Büchi, they collectively proposed that patchouli alcohol in fact had the novel structure 2. The discrepancy had resulted from an unanticipated skeletal rearrangement when patchoulene was treated with peroxy acid in Büchi's confirmatory synthesis. The rearranged molecule coincidentally exhibited the correct natural product architecture.

== See also ==
- Norpatchoulenol
