= Norpatchoulenol =

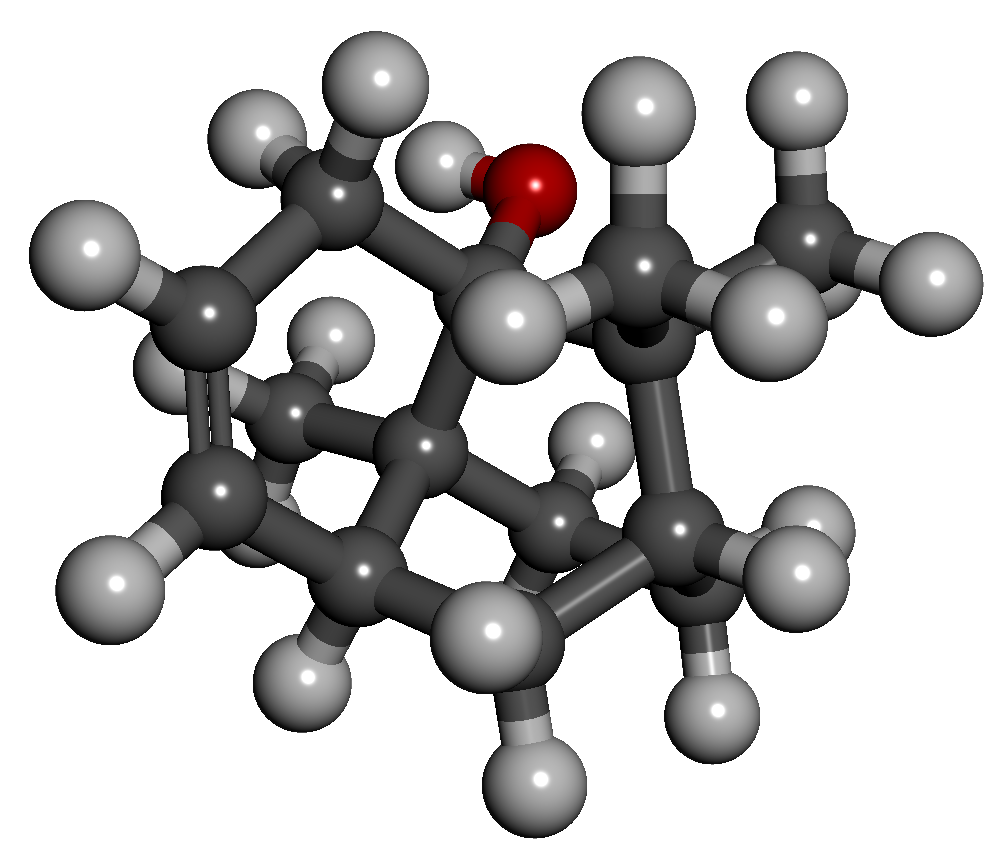

Names
- IUPAC name 8a,9,9-Trimethyl-1,2,4a,5,6,7,8,8a-octahydro-1,6-methanonaphthalen-1-ol

Identifiers
CAS Number	41429-52-1
3D model (JSmol)	Interactive image
ChemSpider	10005248
PubChem CID	6451732
CompTox Dashboard (EPA)	DTXSID90961676
- InChI: InChI=1S/C14H22O/c1-12(2)10-6-8-13(3)11(9-10)5-4-7-14(12,13)15/h4-5,10-11,15H,6-9H2,1-3H3/t10?,11?,13-,14?/m0/s1 Key: OSQSDJNIURJARY-QHNNHONCSA-N; InChI=1/C14H22O/c1-12(2)10-6-8-13(3)11(9-10)5-4-7-14(12,13)15/h4-5,10-11,15H,6-9H2,1-3H3/t10?,11?,13-,14?/m0/s1 Key: OSQSDJNIURJARY-QHNNHONCBN
- SMILES: C[C@]31CCC2CC3/C=C\CC1(O)C2(C)C

Properties
Chemical formula	C_{14}H_{22}O
Molar mass	206.329 g·mol^{−1}
- Except where otherwise noted, data are given for materials in their standard state (at 25 °C [77 °F], 100 kPa). verify (what is ?) Infobox references

Norpatchoulenol is a tricyclic terpenoid found in commercial patchouli extract in small quantities, and thought to contribute significantly to the aroma of patchouli oil.

== See also ==
- Patchoulol
