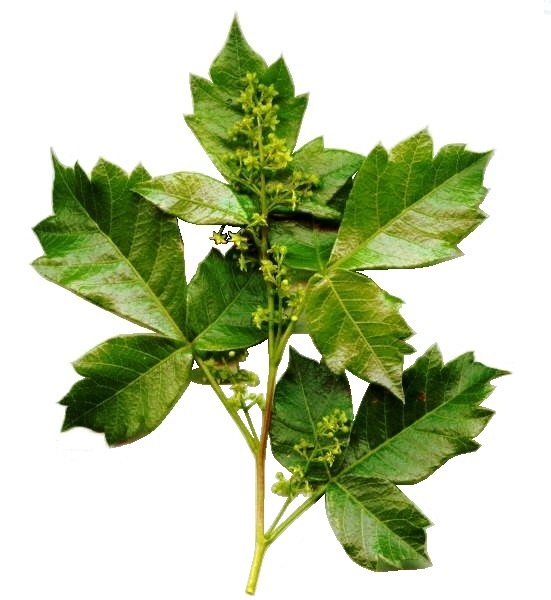

Scientific classification
- Kingdom: Plantae
- Clade: Tracheophytes
- Clade: Angiosperms
- Clade: Eudicots
- Clade: Rosids
- Order: Sapindales
- Family: Anacardiaceae
- Genus: Searsia
- Species: S. dentata

Binomial name
- Searsia dentata (Thunb.) F.A.Barkley

Synonyms
- Rhus dentata Thunb.

= Searsia dentata =

Species of tree

Searsia dentata, the nana-berry (English), or nanabessie (Afrikaans), is a medium-sized, deciduous tree, reaching a height of about 5 metres and a spread of 4 metres, and with a tendency to scramble through and over neighbouring trees. It occurs naturally in almost the whole of South Africa except the Western and Northern Cape Provinces. Its habitat varies from sea level to the highlands of the Drakensberg. It is frost-hardy and should be planted in full sun. The strongly aromatic leaves are usually conspicuously toothed (hence the name dentata), though sometimes they may be only slightly toothed. The tree produces small, creamy-white flowers in masses, developing into small, flattened drupes (5-6mm) which turn red or orange when ripe and brown when dry. The ripe fruits are eaten by birds, while the foliage is food for the larvae of the pepper tree moth Bombycomorpha bifascia.

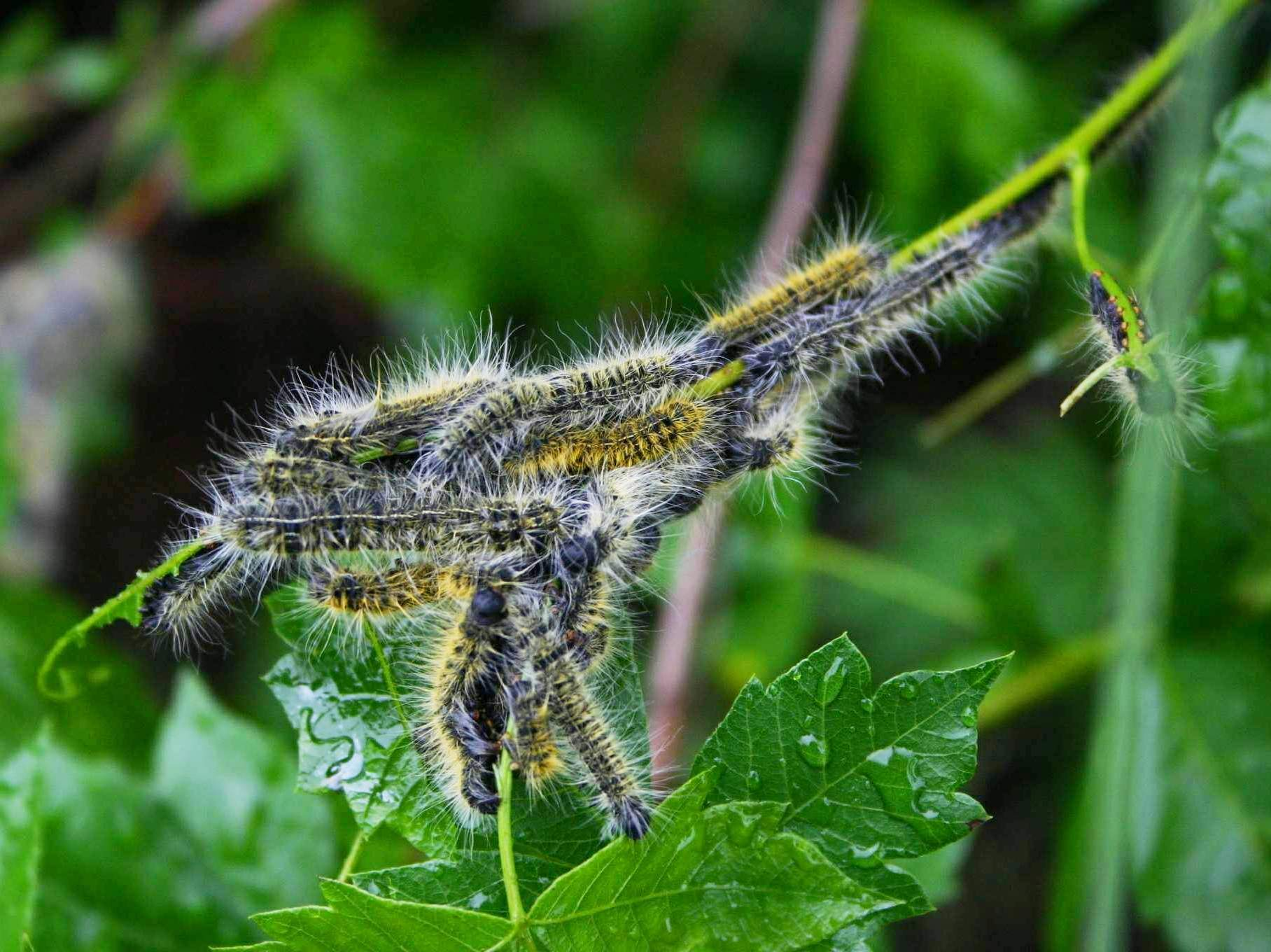
Bombycomorpha bifascia feeding on Searsia dentata

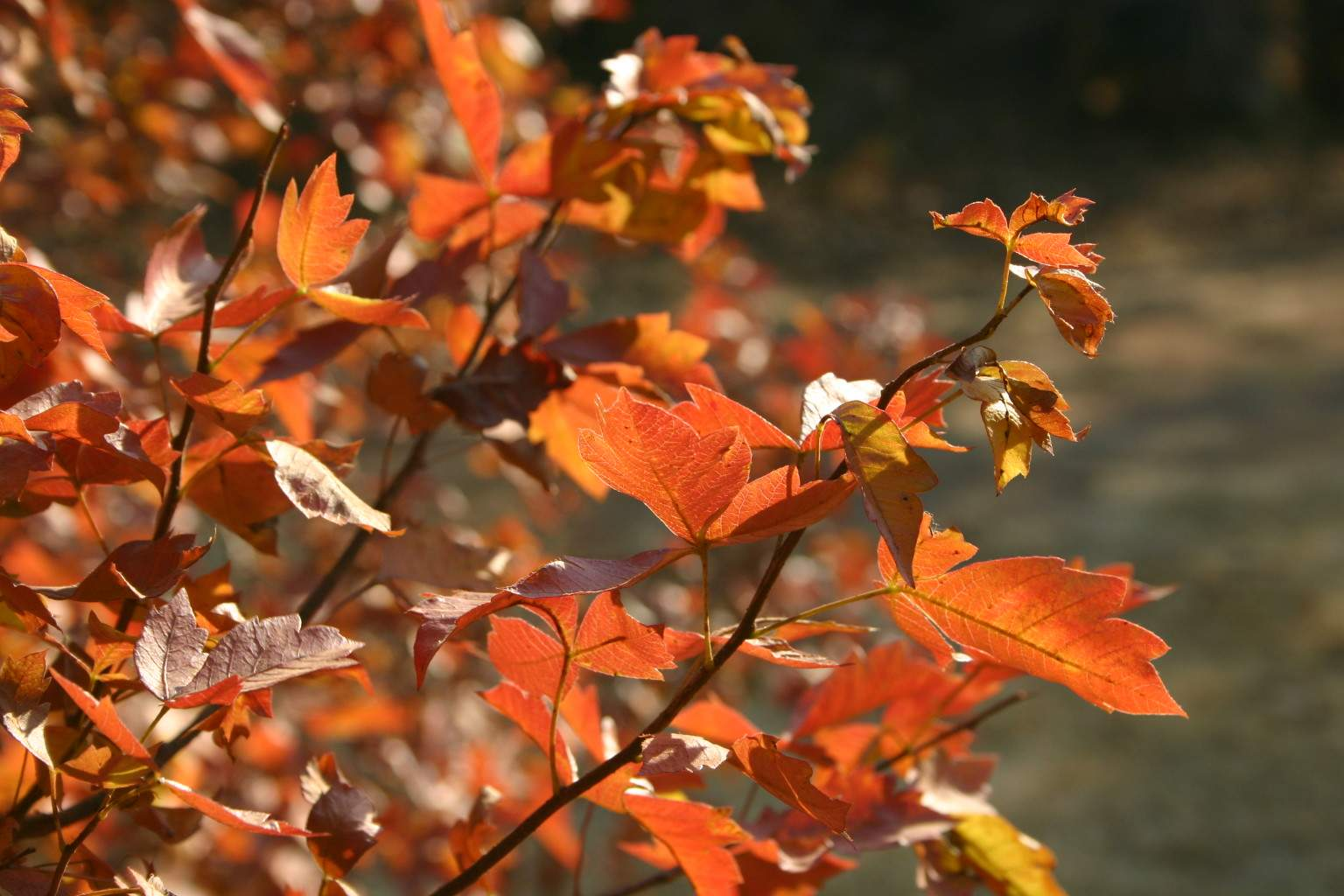
Autumn colours of Searsia dentata
