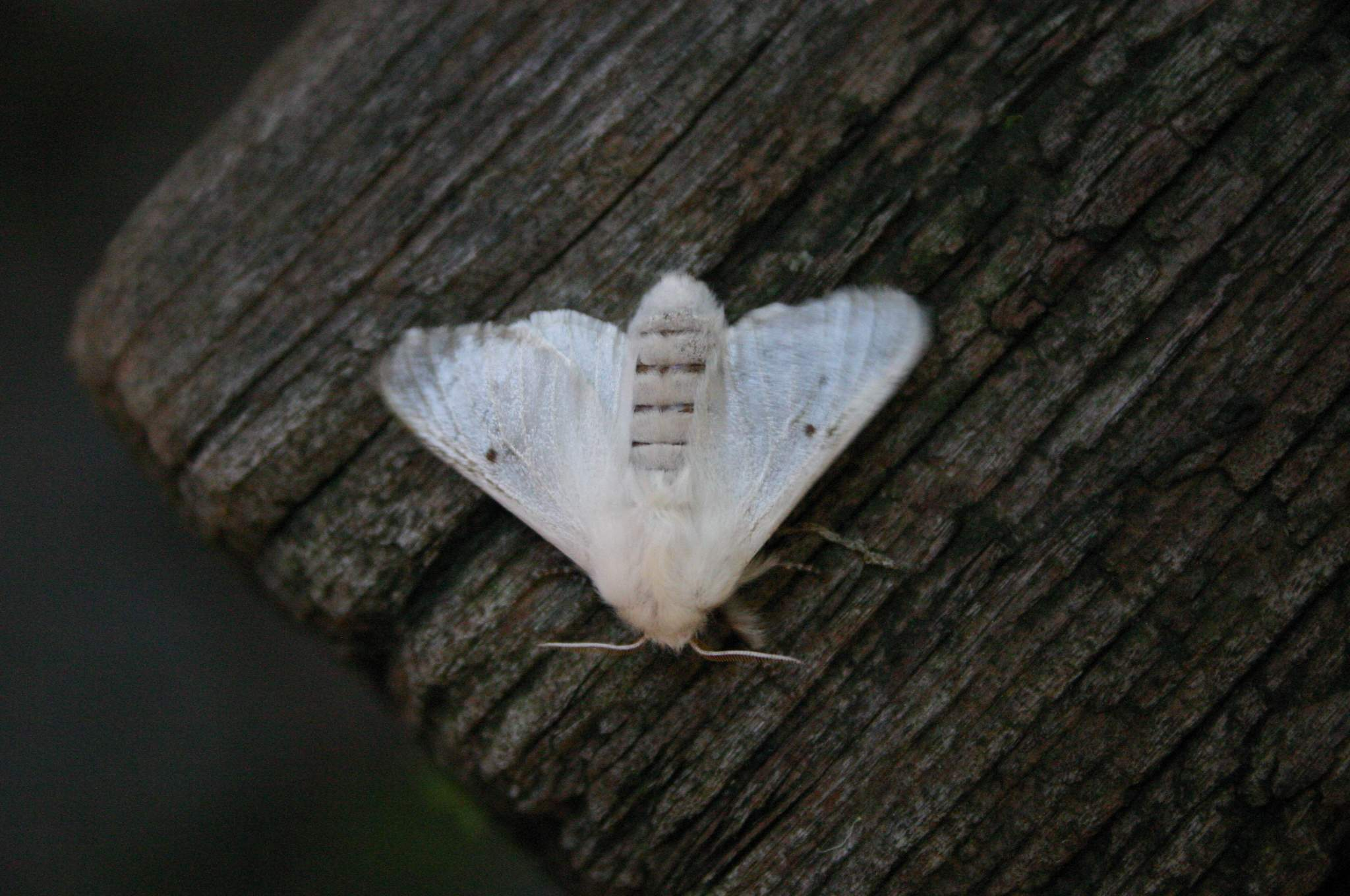
- Bombycomorpha bifascia

Scientific classification
- Domain: Eukaryota
- Kingdom: Animalia
- Phylum: Arthropoda
- Class: Insecta
- Order: Lepidoptera
- Family: Lasiocampidae
- Genus: Bombycomorpha; Felder, 1874

= Bombycomorpha =

Genus of moths

Bombycomorpha is a genus of moths in the family Lasiocampidae. The genus was erected by Felder in 1874.

== Species ==
- Bombycomorpha bifascia Walker, 1855
- Bombycomorpha dukei Joannou & Gurkovich, 2009
- Bombycomorpha pallida Distant, 1897
