= Coco Mademoiselle =

Women's perfume made by Chanel

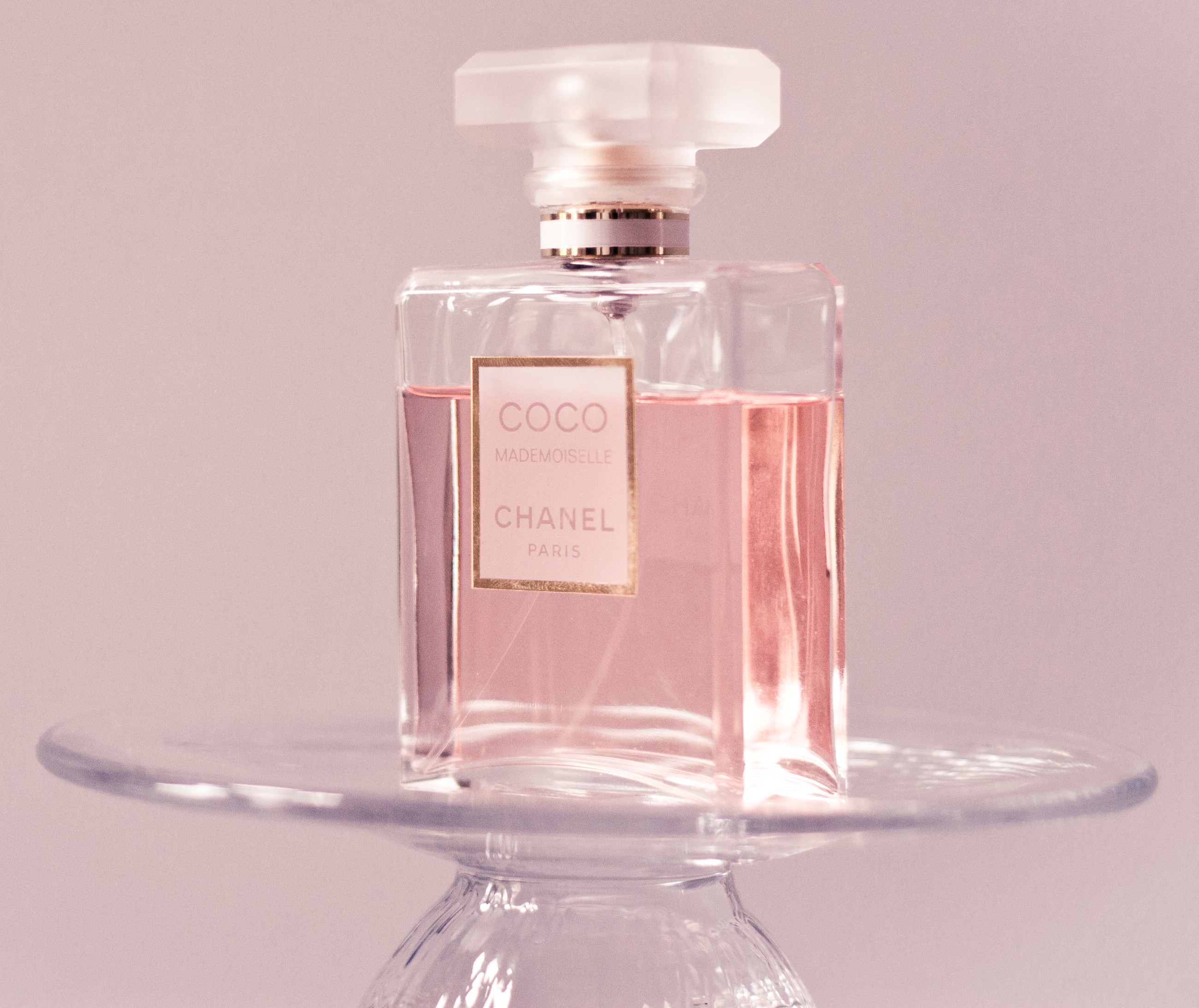

Fragrance by Chanel
- Category: Woody floral
- Designed for: Women
- Top notes: Orange
- Heart notes: Jasmine; Rose
- Base notes: Patchouli; Vetiver
- Released: 2001; 25 years ago
- Label: Chanel
- Perfumer(s): Jacques Polge
- Concentration: Eau de Parfum
- Flanker(s): Coco Mademoiselle Intense; Coco Mademoiselle L'Eau Privée
- Predecessor: Coco (1984)
- Website: Official website

Coco Mademoiselle is a women's perfume by French fashion house Chanel, introduced in 2001 for younger consumers. The fragrance was created by Jacques Polge, the nose of Chanel from 1978 to 2015.

== Coco Mademoiselle le Film ==
In 2006, Chanel launched a new advertising film starring its current spokesmodel Keira Knightley as Coco Chanel. The film was directed by the upcoming English BAFTA-winning director Joe Wright, who has also worked with Knightley in his award-winning films Pride & Prejudice (2005) and Atonement (2007). The soul singer Joss Stone re-recorded Nat King Cole's 1965 "L-O-V-E" for the short film.

== Advertisements ==
In 2014, an advertisement directed by Wright was shot in the Cité du Cinéma by Luc Besson with Knightley and Danila Kozlovsky in the lead roles.

== Notes ==
- Top notes: orange, bergamot, mandarin, Tunisian curaçao
- Middle notes: morning rose, Italian jasmine, ylang-ylang, mimosa, florentine iris
- Base notes: patchouli, Haitian vetiver, Bourbon vanilla, white musk, opoponax, tonka bean

== Spokesmodels ==
Famous spokesmodels for the fragrance have included Kate Moss, Knightley and Whitney Peak (current).

== See also ==
- Coco, the 1984 perfume created by Polge for Chanel
