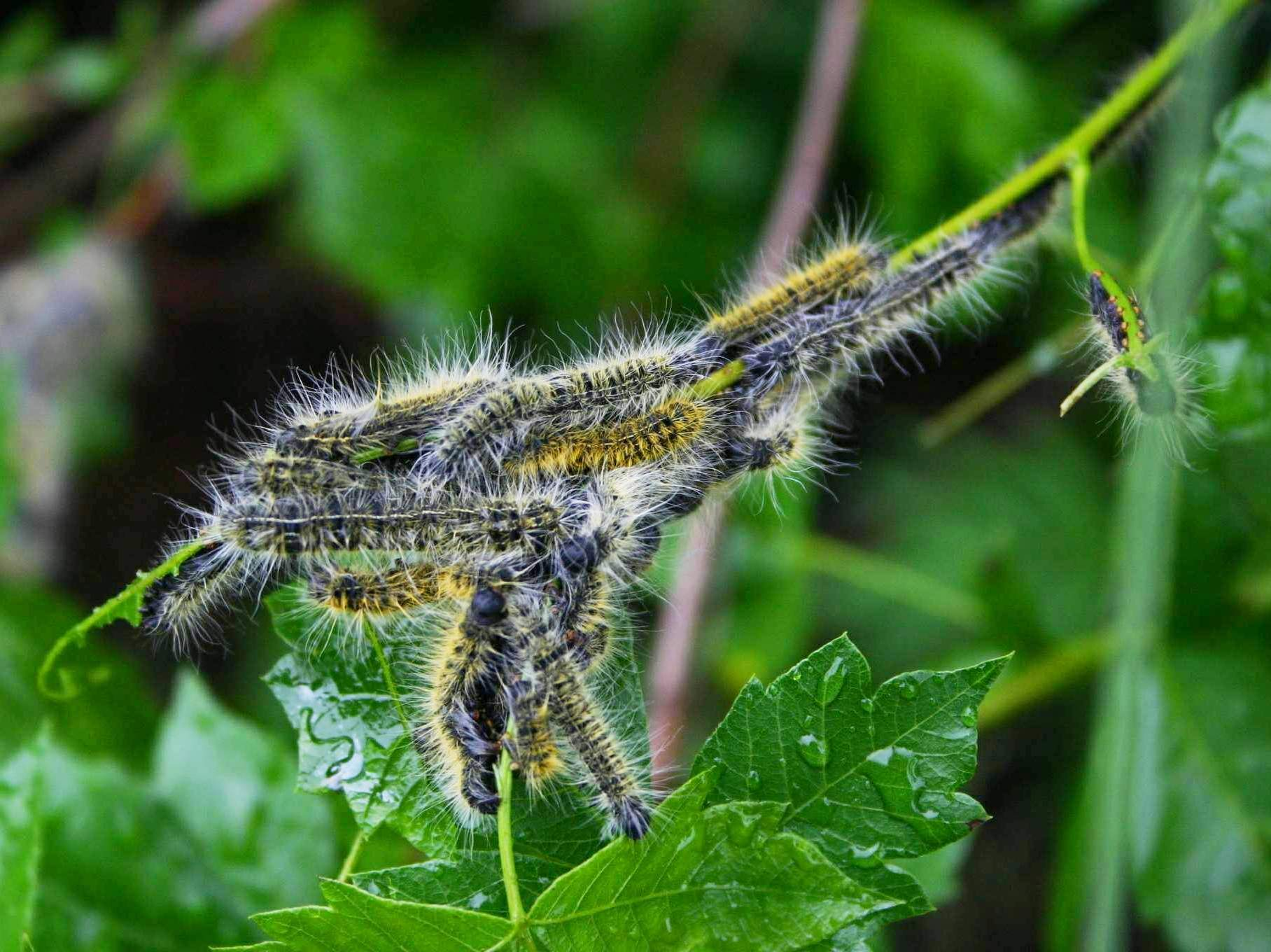

Scientific classification
- Kingdom: Animalia
- Phylum: Arthropoda
- Class: Insecta
- Order: Lepidoptera
- Family: Lasiocampidae
- Genus: Bombycomorpha
- Species: B. bifascia

Binomial name
- Bombycomorpha bifascia Walker, 1855

Synonyms
- Bombycomorpha pallida Distant, 1897

= Bombycomorpha bifascia =

Species of moth found in southern Africa

Bombycomorpha bifascia, the pepper-tree caterpillar, is a moth of the family Lasiocampidae, which is native to southern Africa.

== Food plants ==
The larvae feed on the foliage of Searsia dentata, the pepper tree Schinus molle, and other Anacardiaceae. They show a preference for the foliage of the introduced pepper tree. The larvae are highly gregarious and feed in small groups, with a tendency to become cannibalistic when food is depleted.

== Life cycle ==
The 40 mm-long larva is black with two narrow yellow lines (bifascia) running down each flank. A coating of orange hairs gives it a yellowish appearance. After moulting four times, they attain full size in 50–60 days, when they descend to ground level and search for a suitable pupating spot. The cocoons are about 20 mm long and chocolate-brown in colour, their surface texture and colour resembling that of dried mud. After some 14 days, the moth emerges. If weather conditions are unfavourable, the larvae hibernate until the following spring.

== Etymology ==
Their generic name Bombycomorpha refers to their resemblance to the silkworm moths, genus Bombyx.

== Life stages ==
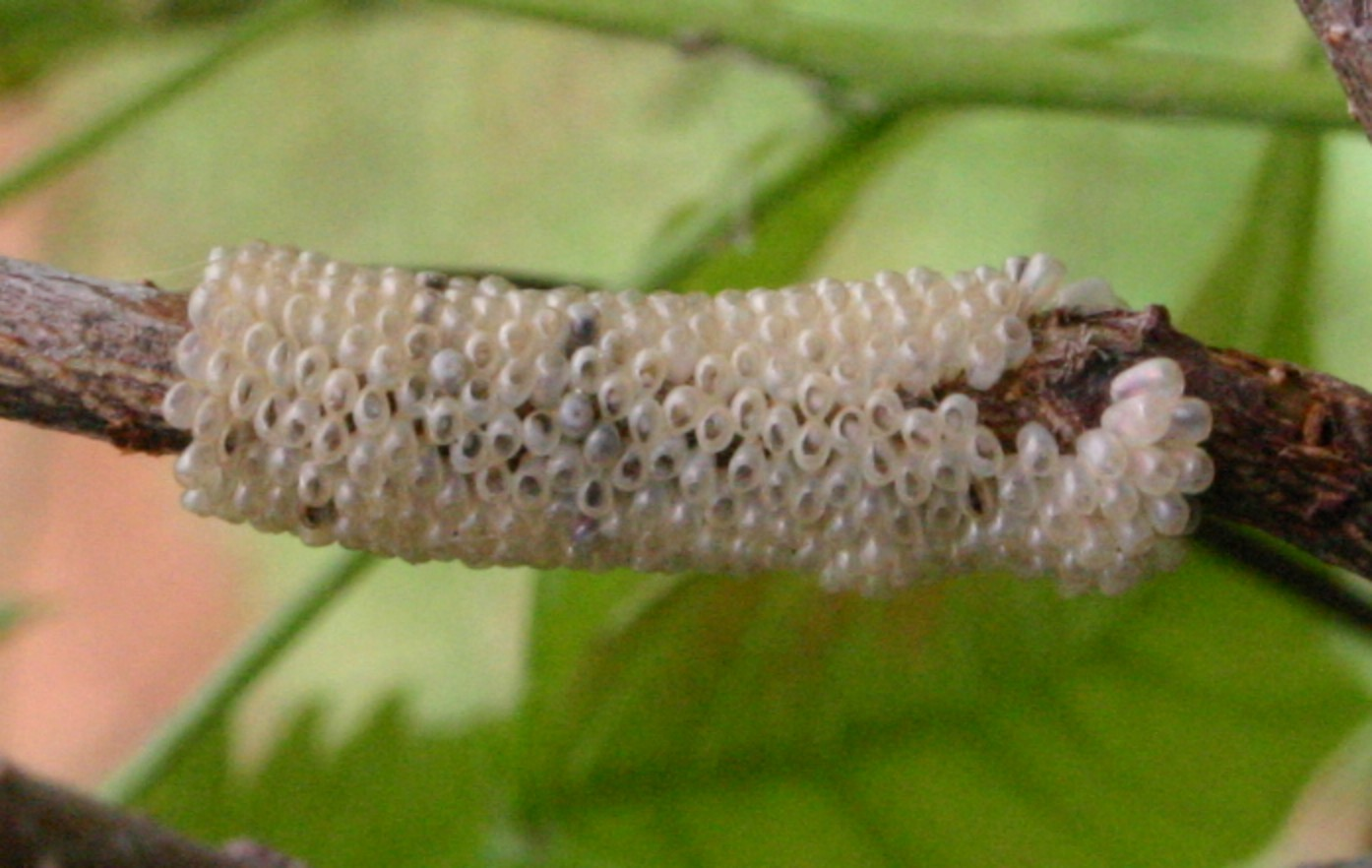
Eggs

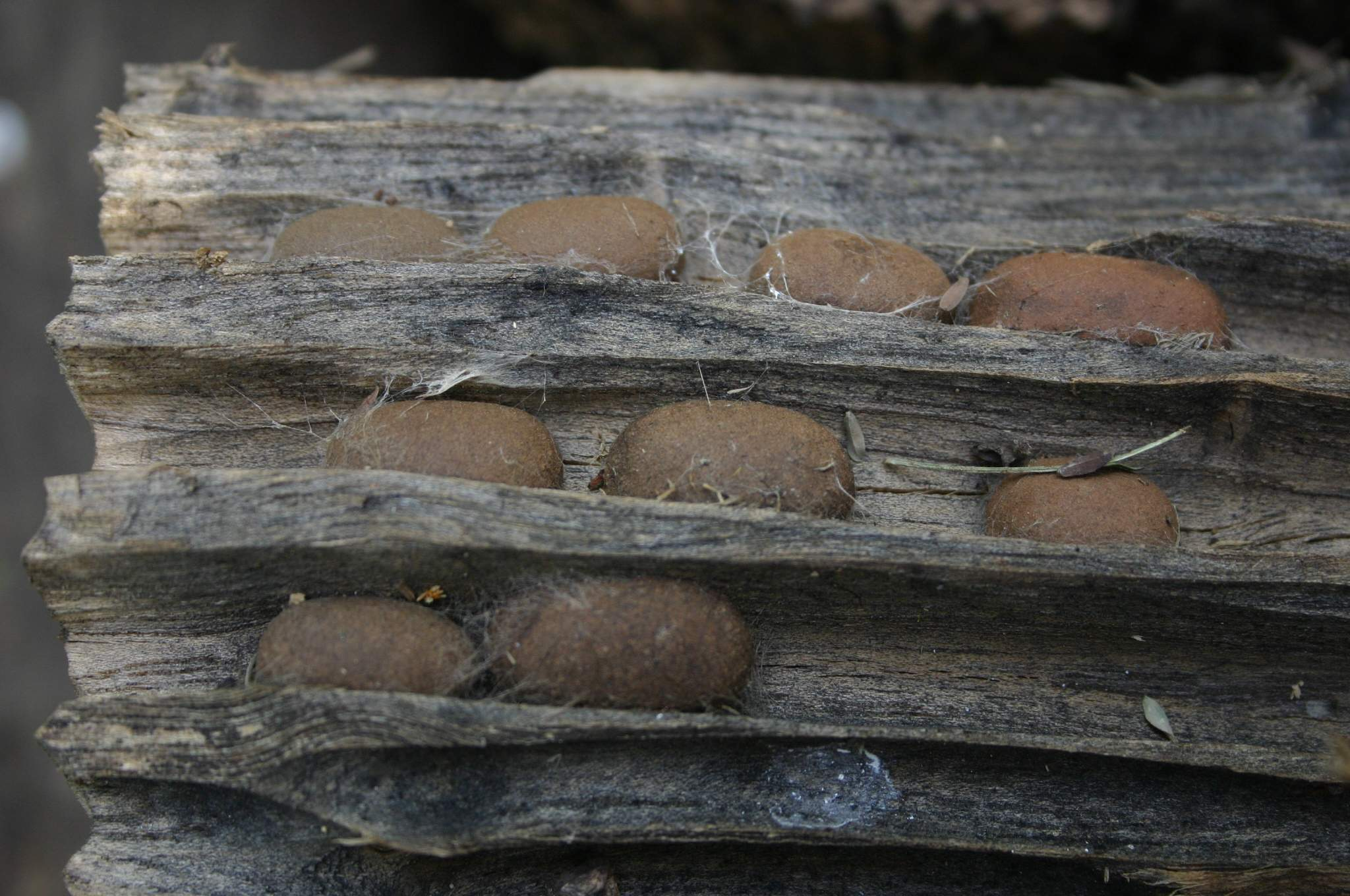
Cocoons

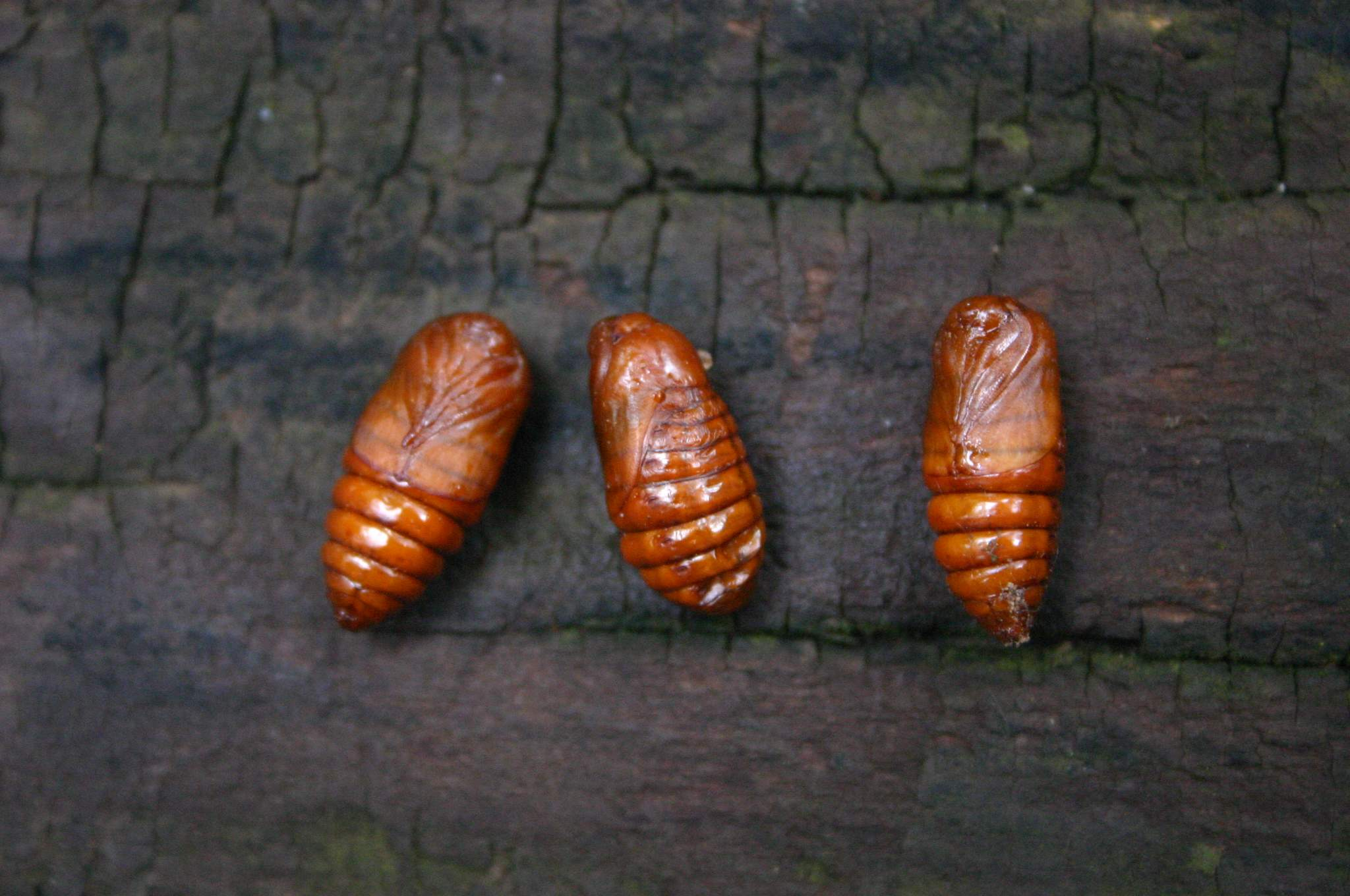
Pupae

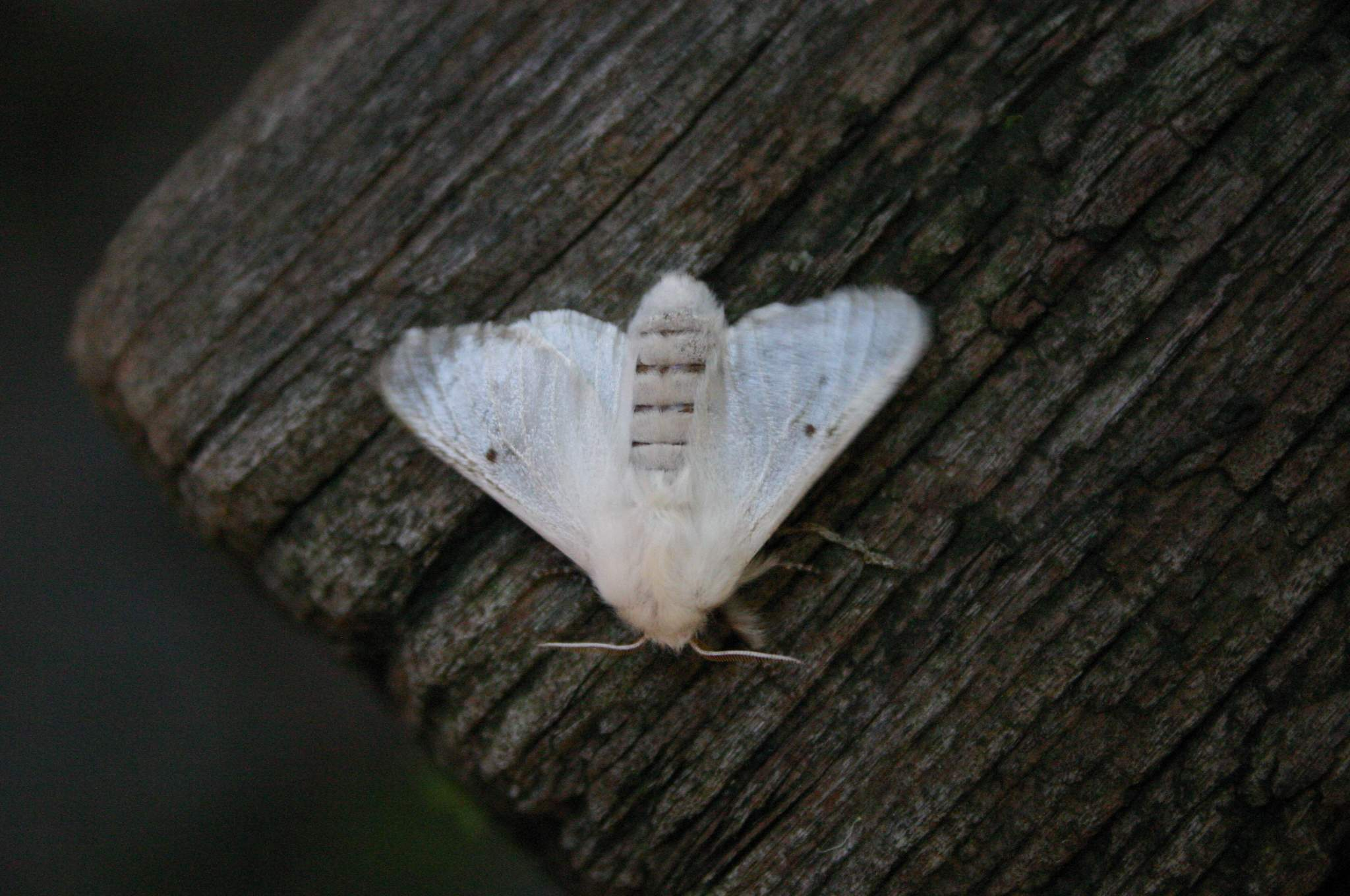
Adult moth
