= Egoista =

Egoista may refer to:

- "Egoísta", a 2010 song by Belinda
- "Egoista" (Alexia song), 2003
- "Egoísta", a 2021 song by Frank Reyes from Aventurero
- Lamborghini Egoista, a Lamborghini sports car
