= Olivier Polge =

French perfumer

- Born: 30 July 1974 (age 51); Grasse, France
- Occupation: Perfumer
- Employer: Chanel (2013–present)

Olivier Polge (born July 30, 1974) is a French perfumer. He is the house perfumer for Chanel and has created fragrances including Misia, Boy, and Chanel No. 5 L'Eau.

Polge's father is perfumer Jacques Polge, who served as Chanel's perfumer for 37 years. When Polge was a child, he wanted to be a classical music pianist, but was not a "good pianist." Polge became an intern at Chanel while studying art history. He worked for International Flavours and Fragrances, where he co-created Dior Homme and Viktor and Rolf's Flowerbomb. In 2012, Olivier Polge, in collaboration with perfumers Dominique Ropion and Anne Flipo, created the famous fragrance La Vie Est Belle for the Lancome brand. In 2013, Polge became a perfumer at Chanel. His father retired in 2015, and Polge took over as head perfumer.

In 2018 Polge created the Bleu de Chanel Parfum, a new version of the fragrance Bleu de Chanel, originally created by his father.

== Biography ==
Before embarking on a career in perfumery, Olivier Polge studied art history. He began working at Charabot, a factory in his hometown of Grasse specializing in the processing of ingredients for perfumery, then joined ACM in Geneva. From 1998 onwards, Olivier Polge worked at International Flavors & Fragrances, a perfume creation company in New York City. He returned to France in 2003, still with IFF, where he created his first designs, including the Dior Homme fragrance in 2005 .

In 2009, Olivier Polge won the International Perfume Prize, for five of his creations . The prize was presented to him by William Christie (musician), president of the jury .

In 2012, Olivier Polge participated in the creation of SpiceBomb by Viktor & Rolf, La Vie est belle by Lancôme, and Repetto for the eponymous brand in 2013. In September 2013, he joined Les Parfums Chanel. There he joined Christopher Sheldrake, director of research and development at the laboratory, as well as his father Jacques Polge, who had been working there as a perfumer since 1978. Olivier Polge succeeded his father at Chanel with the aim of “preserving a unique olfactory heritage and innovating ” at the beginning of 2015.

In 2015, he created N°5 L'Eau, an eau de parfum derived from N°5.

In 2018, he created the fragrance version of Bleu de Chanel.
