= Égoïste (magazine) =

French photography and lifestyle magazine

- Editor in Chief: Nicole Wisniak
- Categories: Photography and lifestyle
- Frequency: Irregular
- Founded: 1977
- Based in: Paris, France
- Language: French

Égoïste is a French magazine, founded in 1977 by Gérard-Julien Salvy and Nicole Wisniak, primarily an arts and culture publication with a particular emphasis on photography and fashion. Wisniak originally intended to create a quarterly magazine; however, the issues have been released in an irregular, episodic fashion over the years.

== History and profile ==
Each issue of the large-format magazine is around 200 pages long, published strictly in black and white, and printed on heavy stock paper that accounts for its sizable weight. The first issue, printed in 1977, featured a portrait of Andy Warhol by his friend, graphic designer Philippe Morillon, who was also responsible for the cover. Nicole Wisniak has been the sole editor and decision-maker about every aspect of the magazine since inception, including the art direction of the original advertisements that finance its publication.

Photographers whose work has appeared in Égoïste include Helmut Newton, Richard Avedon, Bettina Rheims, Paolo Roversi, Ellen von Unwerth, and Max Vadukul. In 1987, Wisniak secured rights to publish Avedon's previously unseen photographs of Andy Warhol's scarred midriff. The magazine has also typically featured essays and interviews written by authors such as Nobel laureate J. M. G. Le Clézio, Marguerite Duras, Cioran, Jean-Edern Hallier, Françoise Sagan, William Styron, Jean d'Ormesson, Michel Tournier, Bernard-Henri Lévy, and François Nourissier. In 1990, the French fashion company Chanel had to purchase the usage rights to the name Égoïste from Wisniak, in order to release its namesake perfume.
