= Jacques Polge =

French perfumer

- Born: 14 June 1943 (age 83); L'Isle-sur-la-Sorgue, French Third Republic
- Education: Aix-Marseille University
- Occupation: Perfumer
- Years active: 1970–2015
- Employer: Chanel (1978–2015)
- Children: Olivier Polge
- Awards: Ordre national du Mérite

Jacques Polge (born 14 June 1943) is a French perfumer, best known for his role as Head Perfumer at Les Parfums Chanel from 1978 to 2015.

== Early life ==
Jacques Polge grew up near Avignon, France where he says he was inspired as a child by the scent of air in the surroundings of Grasse, which was redolent with the scent of jasmine. After his studies at Aix-Marseille University, where he pursued a degree in English and literature, Jacques Polge began a traditional apprenticeship in Grasse under the guidance of Jean Carles.

Jacques Polge is the father of perfumer Olivier Polge, who joined him at Chanel in 2013.

== Works ==
- 1970 - Rive Gauche, Yves Saint Laurent
- 1982 - Diva, Emanuel Ungaro
- 1987 - Senso, Emanuel Ungaro
- 1990 - Ungaro, Emanuel Ungaro
- 1989 - Tiffany for Men, Tiffany

Polge's perfumes at Chanel include:

- 1982 - Antaeus
- 1984 - Coco

inspired by the Parisian home of Coco Chanel

- 1990 - Égoïste

originally launched as a limited edition scent named "Bois Noir"' in 1987, the fragrance was eventually relaunched to the general market under the name Égoïste. Jacques Polge has said Égoïste is his favourite creation.
including Égoïste Platinum (1993)

- 1996 - Allure
- 1999 - Allure Homme

including flankers
Allure Homme Sport (2004),
Allure Homme Sport Cologne (2007),
Allure Homme Edition Blanche (2008),
Allure Homme Sport Eau Extreme (2012).

- 2001 - Coco Mademoiselle

winner of FiFi Award for Best National Advertising Campaign / TV in 2008

- 2002 - Chance
- 2010 - Bleu de Chanel Eau de Toilette including Bleu de Chanel Eau de Parfum (2014)
- Les Exclusifs de Chanel fragrances notably Coromandel and Sycomore created with Christopher Sheldrake.
- 2012 - Coco Noir

created with Christopher Sheldrake
