= Pink peppercorn =

Dried berry of the shrub Schinus molle

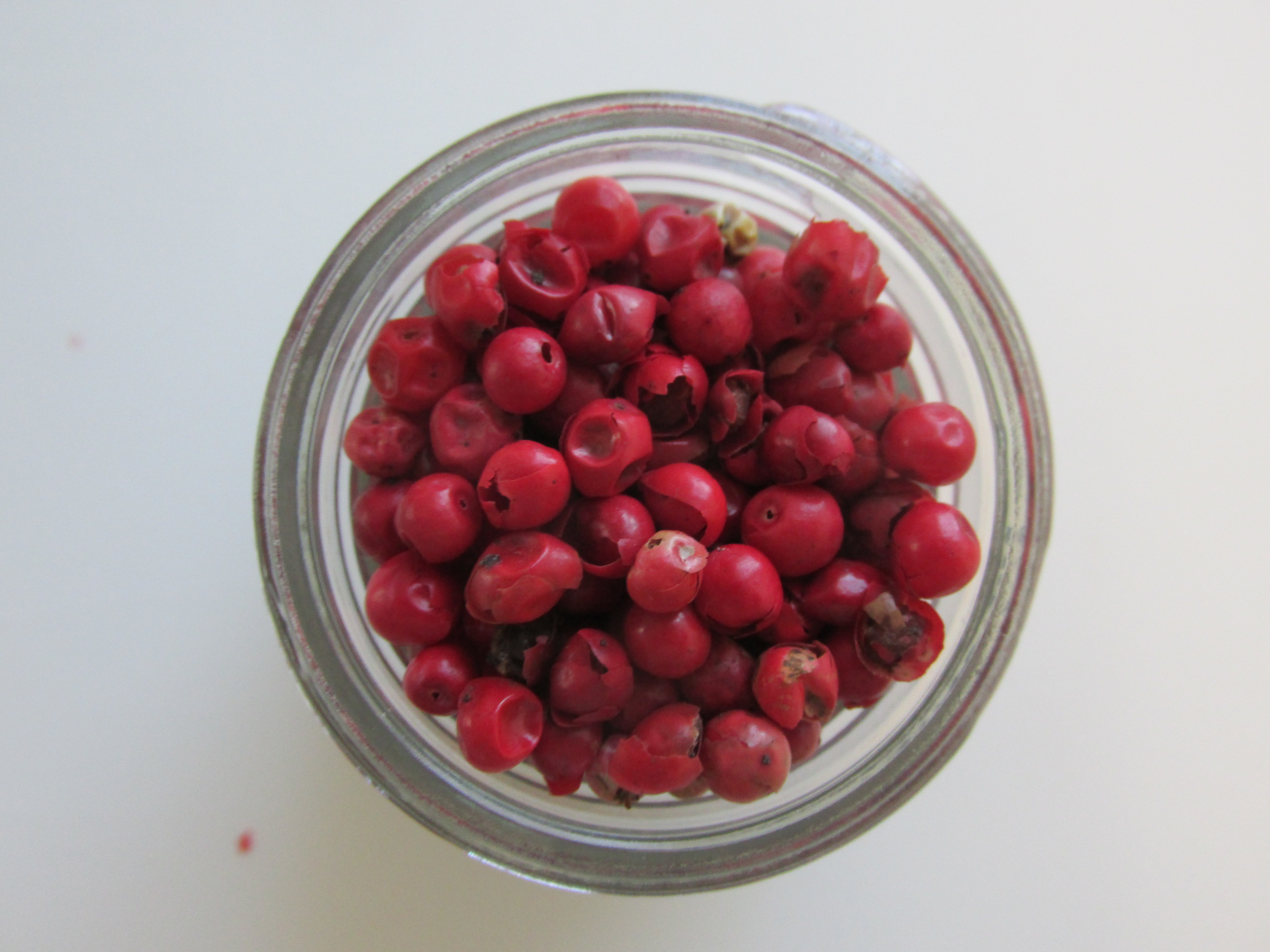
- Pink peppercorns
- Alternative names: Baie rose
- Type: Dried berry

A pink peppercorn (French: baie rose [bɛ ʁoz] 'pink berry') is a dried berry referring to three different species: the traditional Baies rose plant Euonymus phellomanus; the tree Schinus molle, commonly known as the Peruvian peppertree; and Schinus terebinthifolia (the Brazilian pepper).

== History ==
Although not related to commercial pepper (Piper nigrum), the pink/red berries of the Peruvian peppertree (Schinus molle) are sold as pink peppercorns and often blended with commercial pepper. Pink peppercorns came to be called such because they resemble peppercorns, and because they, too, have a peppery flavor. As they are members of the cashew family, they may cause allergic reactions including anaphylaxis for people with a tree nut allergy. The fruit and leaves of Peruvian pepper are potentially poisonous to poultry, pigs and possibly calves. Records also exist of young children who have experienced vomiting and diarrhea after eating the fruit.

Dried berries from the related species Schinus terebinthifolia (the Brazilian pepper) are sometimes also called pink peppercorns (baies roses de Bourbon) and are used as a culinary spice. The Brazilian pepper was introduced as an ornamental plant to Florida by at latest 1891, probably earlier, where it has spread rapidly since about 1940, and eventually became invasive in the area where it is often referred to as "Florida Holly".

In 1982, the Food and Drug Administration (FDA) banned the import of Brazilian peppercorns from France into the United States, asserting that people who eat the berries risk an array of acute symptoms, such as swollen eyelids and indigestion, similar to poison ivy. In response, the Government of France maintained that the berries are safe to eat if grown in prescribed conditions. The United States later lifted the ban. Presently both species of the Schinus pink peppercorn lack "generally recognized as safe" (GRAS) status with the FDA.

== See also ==
- List of dried foods
