= Pogostone =

Names
- Preferred IUPAC name 4-hydroxy-6-methyl-3-(4-methylpentanoyl)pyran-2-one
- Other names Dhelwangin

Identifiers
CAS Number	23800-56-8
3D model (JSmol)	Interactive image
ChEBI	CHEBI:138756
ChemSpider	13415784
PubChem CID	54695756
UNII	QG8U8GA5EP
CompTox Dashboard (EPA)	DTXSID001019967
- InChI: InChI=1S/C12H16O4/c1-7(2)4-5-9(13)11-10(14)6-8(3)16-12(11)15/h6-7,14H,4-5H2,1-3H3 Key: AJFJTORMMHWKFW-UHFFFAOYSA-N
- SMILES: CC1=CC(=C(C(=O)O1)C(=O)CCC(C)C)O

Properties
Chemical formula	C_{12}H_{16}O_{4}
Molar mass	224.256 g·mol^{−1}
Appearance	Colorless needles
Melting point	32–33 °C (90–91 °F; 305–306 K)
- Except where otherwise noted, data are given for materials in their standard state (at 25 °C [77 °F], 100 kPa). Infobox references

Pogostone or dhelwangin is a naturally occurring organic compound with the formula C_{12}H_{16}O_{4}. Classified as a secondary metabolite, primarily found in patchouli, a member of the mint family Lamiaceae. This plant has historically been used in traditional Chinese medicine to treat ailments such as the common cold, nausea, diarrhea, headache, and fever, and is also applied for its antifungal properties. Pogostone was first identified in 1969 as the major antimicrobial constituent of Pogostemonis Herba, the dried aerial parts of patchouli used in herbal preparations.

== Structure and properties ==
Pogostone has the molecular formula C_{12}H_{16}O_{4}. Pogostone (PO) was obtained as needle-like colorless crystals. Its melting point was reported as 32–33 °C. It features a 2H-pyranone core and was first structurally characterized by X-ray crystallography, which also revealed the presence of intramolecular hydrogen bonding.

Due to its low natural abundance in the plant, synthetic methods for pogostone production have been developed. One synthetic route involves the condensation of dehydroacetic acid (DHA) with aldehydes in dry tetrahydrofuran (THF) under nitrogen at low temperature (0–5 °C), followed by hydrogenation, chromatography, and crystallization. The reaction proceeds via deprotonation, Michael addition reaction, tautomerization, and further deprotonation steps. Two diastereomeric dimers of pogostone, with (8S,9R) and (8S,9S) configurations, have also been synthesized and structurally confirmed by nuclear magnetic resonance and X-ray diffraction.

== Applications ==
The development of synthetic routes for pogostone and its analogues facilitates their potential application as novel antifungal agents, particularly in the treatment of azole-resistant Candida albicans infections. Its anti-inflammatory activity also supports further exploration as a therapeutic agent for conditions such as septic shock. However, its inhibitory effects on major cytochrome P450 enzymes warrant caution and further study regarding possible drug–drug interactions.
