= The Egoists =

- Film poster
- Directed by: Ryuichi Hiroki
- Screenplay by: Satoko Okudera
- Based on: Keibetsu by Kenji Nakagami
- Produced by: Yasushi Minatoya; Akira Morishige
- Starring: Anne Suzuki; Kengo Kora; Sora Aoi; Yasushi Fuchikami; Kaoru Kobayashi
- Cinematography: Atsuhiro Nabeshima
- Edited by: Hani Mituhashi
- Production companies: Kadokawa Daiei Studio; Studio3
- Release date: 4 June 2011 (Japan)
- Running time: 136 minutes
- Country: Japan
- Language: Japanese

The Egoists (Japanese: 軽蔑, Hepburn: Keibetsu; lit. "Scorn") is a 2011 Japanese drama film directed by Ryuichi Hiroki. The film stars Anne Suzuki, Kengo Kora, Sora Aoi, Kaoru Kobayashi, Mako Midori and Jun Murakami. It is based on the novel Keibetsu by Kenji Nakagami.

== Cast ==
- Anne Suzuki
- Kengo Kora
- Sora Aoi
- Yasushi Fuchikami
- Kaoru Kobayashi
- Mako Midori
- Jun Murakami
- Toshie Negishi
- Nao Ohmori
- Shugo Oshinari
- Tomorō Taguchi
