= Bonaventura Tecchi =

Italian writer

Bonaventura Tecchi (11 February 1896 – 18 June 1968) was an Italian writer, best known as an essayist, a Germanist and a novelist.

== Life ==
Tecchi was born in Bagnoregio. After his classical studies, he graduated in literature at the University of Rome. He was a brave and decorate for value volunteer in the First World War, where he was wounded and taken prisoner at Cellelager, south of Hamburg. This experience, recalled in the 1961 novel Baracca 15C, approached him to the Germanic world and was decisive in the choice to dedicate himself to the study of Germanic literary world. He later travelled Germany, Switzerland and Czechoslovakia and spent time in the towns of Brno and Bratislava.

Tecchi was appointed Professor of German literature at the University of Rome. From 1942 he was Professor of German language and literature at the Institute "Maria Ss. Assunta" in Rome. He received literary awards including the Premio Bancarella, in 1959, with his work Gli egoisti. From 1963 he was member of the Accademia dei Lincei. He published a series of novels, short stories and prose that examined moral and psychological problems analyzed under a Christian perspective. He died in Rome, aged 72.

== Bibliography ==
Among his most famous works include:

- Il nome sulla sabbia (1924)
- Il vento tra le case (1928)
- Tre storie d'amore (1931)
- I Villatauri (1935)
- Ernestina (1936)
- Idilli Moravi (1939)
- Giovani amici (1940)
- La vedova timida (1942)
- Vigilia di guerra (1942)
- Un'estate in campagna (1945)
- L'isola appassionata (1945)
- La presenza del male (1949)
- Valentina Velier (1950)
- Creature sole (1950)
- Luna a ponente (1955)
- Le due voci (1956)
- Storie di bestie (1958)
- Gli egoisti (1959); trans. The Egoists (1964)
- Baracca 15C (1961)
- Gli onesti (1965)

Among the numerous essays include:

- Wackenroder (1927),
- Carossa (1947),
- L'arte di Thomas Mann (1956),
- Svevia, terra di poeti (1964),
- Goethe scrittore di fiabe (1966),
- Il senso degli altri (1968).
