= Égoïste =

Men's perfume by Chanel

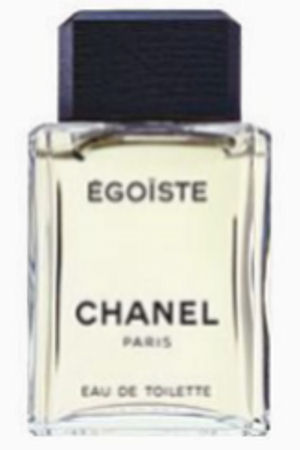

Fragrance by Jacques Polge
- Top notes: Rosewood, mahogany, coriander
- Heart notes: Cinnamon, rose, carnation
- Base notes: Sandalwood, tobacco, ambrette, dried fruits
- Released: 1990
- Label: Chanel
- Flanker(s): Platinum Égoïste
- Website: Égoïste at chanel.com

Égoïste is a men's perfume produced by French fashion house Chanel. It was created by perfumer Jacques Polge. The perfume was released in 1990. The word is French for "egoist" and "egotistic" (both noun and adjective), which means selfish or self-centered (person).

Commercials for the perfume have been directed by Jean-Paul Goude.

== Product history ==
Based on Bois des Îles, Égoïste is the first male perfume with sandalwood oil as its main note. Another of its components is ambrette seed. The fragrance's name when it was introduced domestically in the 1980s was Bois Noir, French for "Black Wood", a name that was originally used in the working stage. Prior to its 1990 international launch, the product was rebranded because Chanel's marketing department did not like the Bois Noir name. The company had to purchase the rights to use the Égoïste name from photography magazine publisher Nicole Wisniak.

Though not a commercial success at the time of its release, Égoïste is now widely considered by perfumers and critics to be one of the greatest fragrances ever created. A pioneer in its genre, it subverted conventional gender boundaries by combining a classical structure with mellow woods, florals and spices.

== Advertising ==
The centerpiece of Chanel's advertising campaign to launch Égoïste first in Europe in April 1990 and in the United States one year later was "Le Carlton", a 30-second commercial in French without subtitles, directed by Jean-Paul Goude and costing more than $1 million. It was filmed in a desert outside of Rio de Janeiro. A stucco facade inspired by that of the Carlton Cannes Hotel was constructed by 300 workers in less than four weeks.

Its primary feature was 36 balconies situated four high and nine wide, each with shuttered doors. With "Dance of the Knights" from Sergei Prokofiev's ballet Romeo and Juliet as its background music, the film opens in black-and-white with a sequence of women dressed in ball gowns shouting lines adapted from Pierre Corneille's tragicomic play Le Cid:

Égoïste. Où es-tu? Montre-toi misérable! Prends garde à mon courroux! Je serai implacable! Ô rage! Ô désespoir! Ô mon amour trahi! N'ai-je donc tant vécu que pour cette infamie? Montre toi, Égoïste! (Egoist. Where are you? Show yourself, miserable one! Beware of my wrath! I will be relentless! O anger! O despair! O my betrayed love! Have I lived so long for this infamy? Show yourself, Egoist!) (Note: The original lines from Act 1, Scene 4 of the play are, "Ô rage! Ô désespoir! Ô vieillesse ennemie! N'ai-je donc tant vécu que pour cette infamie?" ("O anger! O despair! O age my enemy! Have I lived simply to know this infamy?").)

The ad won a Gold Lion award at the International Advertising Festival held at Cannes. Égoïste's sales exceeded initial projections by 35 to 40 percent fifteen months after the international launch.
