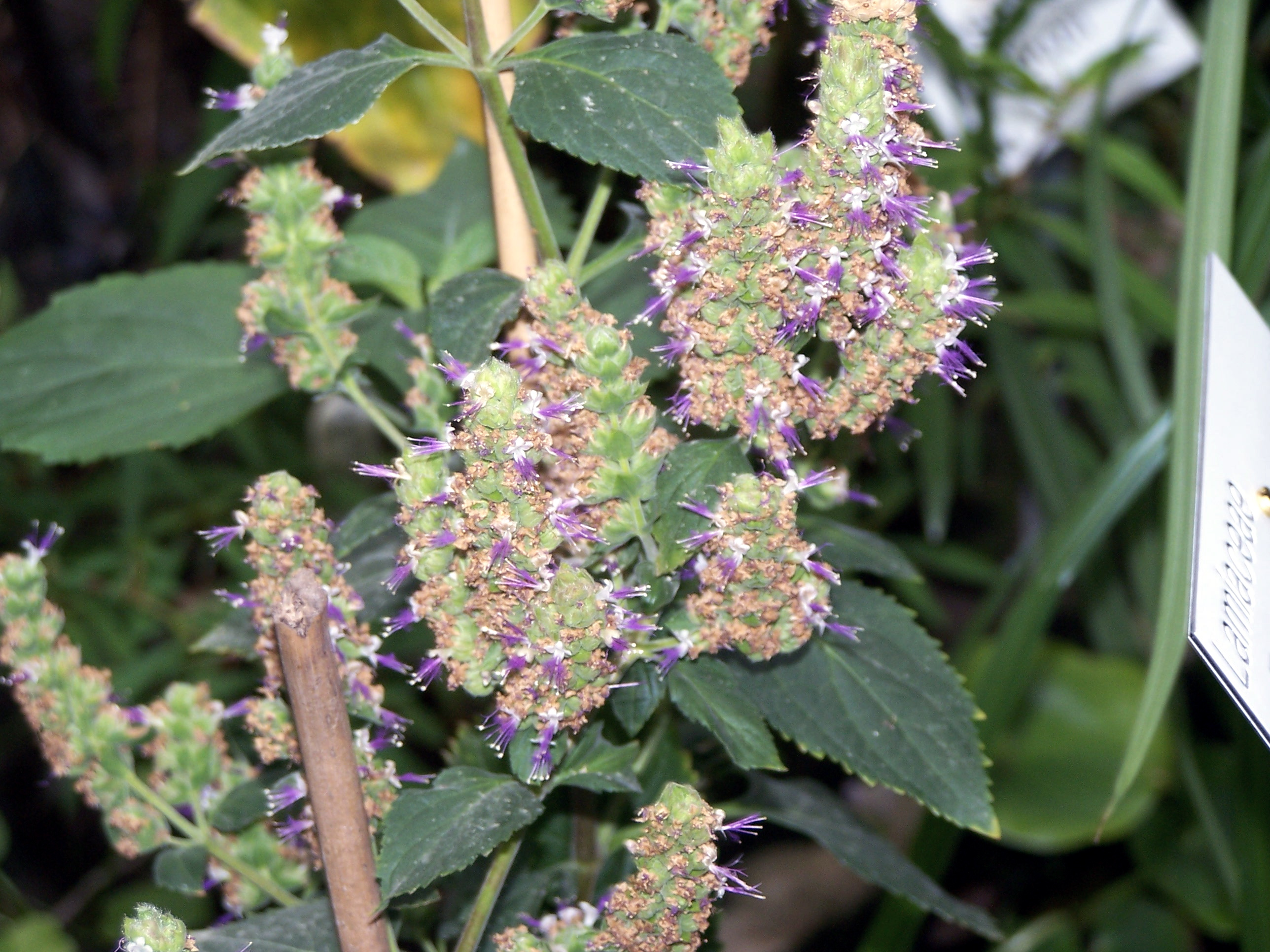

Scientific classification
- Kingdom: Plantae
- Clade: Tracheophytes
- Clade: Angiosperms
- Clade: Eudicots
- Clade: Asterids
- Order: Lamiales
- Family: Lamiaceae
- Genus: Pogostemon
- Species: P. cablin

Binomial name
- Pogostemon cablin (Blanco) Benth.

= Patchouli =

Species of flowering plant

Patchouli (/pəˈtʃuːli/ pə-CHOO-lee; also spelled patchouly or pachouli; Pogostemon cablin) is a species of flowering plant in the family Lamiaceae, commonly called the mint or deadnettle family. The plant grows as a bushy perennial herb, with erect stems reaching up to 75 centimetres (30 in) in height and bearing small, pale, pink-white flowers.

It is native to the island region of Southeast Asia, including Sri Lanka, Indonesia, the Malay Peninsula, New Guinea, and the Philippines. It is also found in many parts of Nepal and North East India. Noted for its fragrant essential oil, it has many commercial uses and is extensively cultivated in tropical climates around the world, especially in Asia, Madagascar, South America, and the Caribbean. As of 2023, global demand for patchouli oil is over 1,600 metric tons (1,600 long tons; 1,800 short tons) per year, of which over 90% is produced by Indonesia.

== Etymology ==
The word derives from the Tamil paccuḷi (பச்சுளி), likely from paccilai (பச்சிலை), a compound of paccai (பச்சை), meaning 'green', and ilai (இலை), meaning 'leaf'.

== Cultivation ==
Patchouli grows well in warm to tropical climates. It thrives in hot, humid weather but not extended periods of direct sunlight. If the plant withers due to lack of water, it tends to recover quickly after rain or watering. Although rare, the seed-producing flowers are very fragrant and blossom in late autumn. The tiny seeds may be harvested for planting, but they are very delicate and easily crushed. Cuttings and grafts from the mother plant and subsequent rooting in loamy soil are the most common methods for propagation.

== Essential oil ==
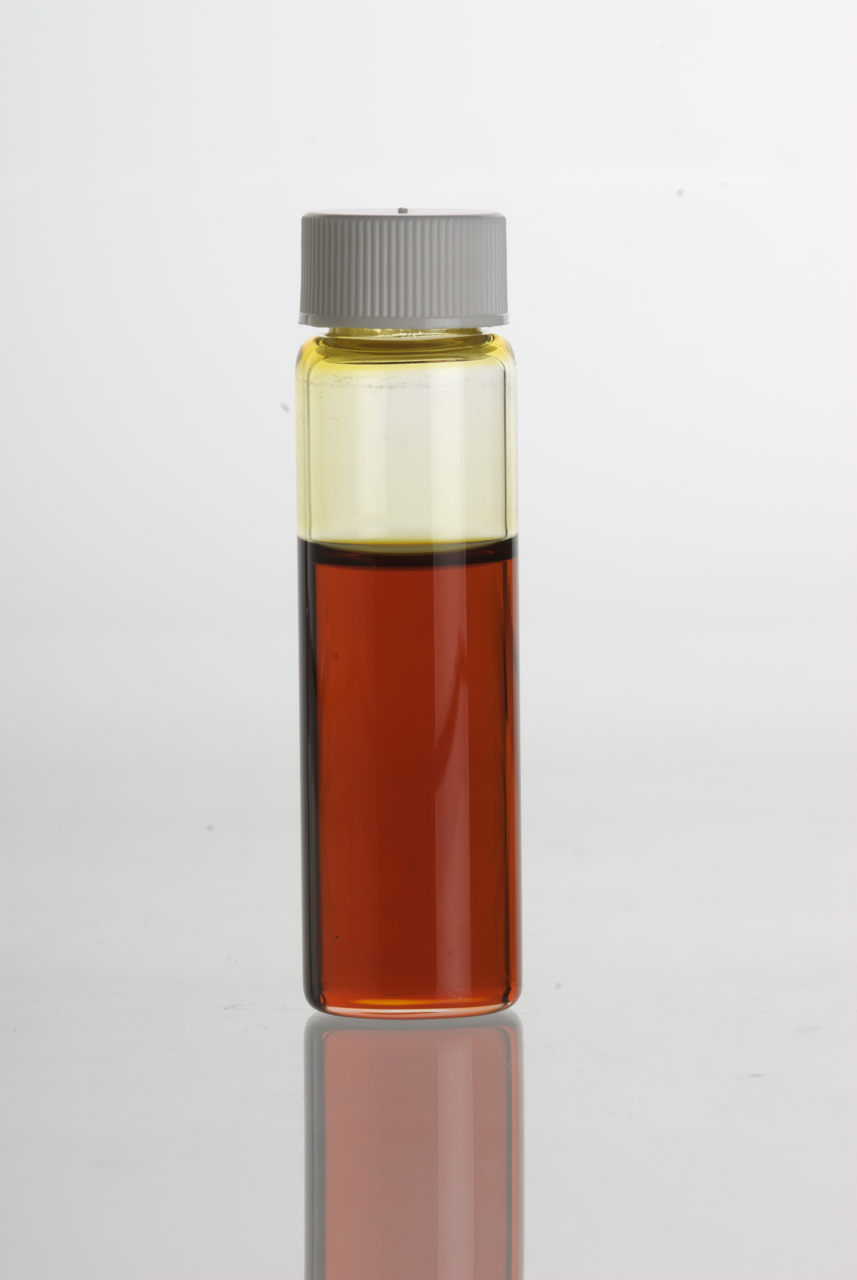
Patchouli (Pogostemon cablin) essential oil

=== Extraction ===
Extraction of patchouli's essential oil is accomplished by steam distillation of the dried leaves and twigs, requiring rupture of its cell walls by steam scalding, light fermentation, or drying. The main chemical component of patchouli oil is patchoulol, a sesquiterpene alcohol. Commercial patchouli oils are frequently graded in terms of their patchoulol content.

Leaves and twigs may be harvested several times a year. Some sources say the highest-quality oil is produced from fresh, share dried biomass distilled close to where they are harvested; others say that boiling the dried leaves and fermenting them for a period of time is best.

=== Components ===
- Germacrene B
- Patchoulol
- Norpatchoulenol
- Pogostone

== Uses ==
The heavy, strong, woody, earthy, balsamic, and spicy scent of patchouli has been used for centuries in perfumes, and more recently in incense, insect repellents, chewing tobacco, many alternative medicines, and intimate objects.

Pogostemon cablin, P. heyneanus and P. plectranthoides are all cultivated for their essential oil, known as patchouli oil. Although there are some sub-varieties, the most common commercial varieties are native to the islands of Sumatra and Sulawesi in Indonesia.

=== Perfume ===
Patchouli oil is used widely in modern perfumery by individuals who create their own scents, as well as in modern scented personal products, such as bay rum, and industrial products, too, such as paper towels, laundry detergents, and air fresheners. Two important components of its essential oil are patchoulol and norpatchoulenol.

=== Insect repellent ===
One study suggests that patchouli oil may serve as an all-purpose insect repellent. More specifically, the patchouli plant has been found to be a potent repellent against the Formosan subterranean termite.

=== Incense ===
Patchouli is an important ingredient in East Asian incense. Both patchouli oil and incense underwent a surge in popularity in the 1960s and 1970s in the US and Europe, mainly as a result of the hippie movement of those decades. Particularly in popular music, the 1976 hit by Al Stewart, "Year of the Cat", contributed to the increased awareness with a reference to it in the bridge, "She comes in incense and patchouli".

=== Culinary ===
Patchouli leaves have been used to make a herbal tea. In some cultures, the leaves are eaten as a vegetable or used as a seasoning. There are also several herbal medicines, both in Indonesia and in China (TCM), that include dry, ground patchouli leaves as one of the key ingredients.

=== Toys ===
In 1985, American toy manufacturer Mattel used patchouli oil in the plastic used to produce the action figure Stinkor in the Masters of the Universe line of toys.

=== Medicine ===
The plant has historically been used in traditional Chinese medicine to treat ailments such as the common cold, nausea, diarrhea, headache, and fever, and is also applied for its antifungal properties. The naturally occurring organic compound found in the plant is pogostone.
