= Causse =

French gloves manufacturer

- Company type: Société par actions simplifiée
- Industry: Fashion
- Founded: 1892 in Millau, France
- Founder: Jules, Paul and Henri Causse
- Headquarters: Millau, France
- Products: Gloves
- Parent: Paraffection (Chanel)
- Website: caussegantier.com

Causse (French: [kos]) is a French luxury glove manufacturer based in Millau (Aveyron) in France. Founded in 1892, the company is one of the oldest glove-making manufactures still active in France. Since 2012, Causse has been owned by Paraffection, the Métiers d’Art subsidiary of the fashion house Chanel.

== History ==
Causse was founded in 1892 by the brothers Jules, Paul, and Henri Causse in Millau, a town historically known for leather processing and glove-making. While Jules and Paul later emigrated to the United States, Henri remained in France and continued the family business. The company remained under family involvement for several generations, with Olivier Causse, a fourth-generation descendant, participating in its management in 2010s.

In the early 2000s, as the glove-making industry faced structural decline, the company was relaunched in 2004 by designers Nadine Carel and Manuel Rubio, with the support of Olivier Causse. The relaunch aimed to preserve traditional glove-making techniques while adapting production to the demands of luxury fashion houses.

In 2012, Causse was acquired by Paraffection, a subsidiary of Chanel dedicated to preserving and supporting artisanal crafts. Following the acquisition, the company retained operational autonomy while benefiting from long-term financial support.

== Production ==
Causse's main workshop is located in Millau on the site of a former tannery. The current manufacturing facility was designed by architect Jean-Michel Wilmotte and completed in the mid-2000s. Millau has been a center of leatherworking and glove-making since the Middle Ages. The workshop is open to visitors and presents the stages of glove production. At the time of its acquisition by Chanel in 2012, Causse employed approximately 40 people and produced around 25,000 pairs of gloves annually.

Causse specialises in the production of luxury leather gloves. The manufacturing process involves approximately one hundred operations, from leather preparation to final shaping on a heated metal form known as a main chaude. Since 2017, it has also produced small leather goods. This activity serves as an entry point for training artisans before specialisation in glove-making.

The company produces gloves under its own name and for luxury fashion houses. Despite its ownership by Chanel, Causse continues to supply other luxury brands. Its clients have included Louis Vuitton, Hermès, Loewe, Givenchy, and Christian Lacroix.

== See also ==
- Lavabre Cadet
