= Lavabre Cadet =

French gloves manufacturer

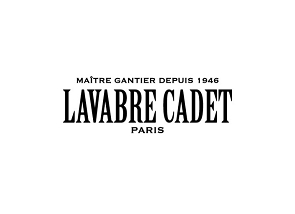
- Industry: Fashion
- Founded: 1946 in Millau, France
- Headquarters: Millau, France
- Products: Gloves
- Parent: Camille Fournet
- Website: lavabrecadet.com

Lavabre Cadet (French pronunciation: [lavaʁb kadɛ]) is a French luxury glove manufacturer based in Millau (Aveyron) in France. Founded in 1946, the company specialises in made-to-measure leather gloves for haute couture houses. Lavabre Cadet has been owned by the French luxury leather goods company Camille Fournet since 2014.

== History ==
Lavabre Cadet was founded in 1946 in Millau, a town historically associated with leather processing and glove-making. From its inception, the company focused on bespoke glove production for fashion houses rather than mass-market distribution.

The workshop gained recognition within haute couture circles and became associated with designers such as Yves Saint Laurent, for whom it produced gloves on a regular basis. The company remained relatively unknown to the general public due to its limited production scale and its orientation toward professional clients.

In the early 2000s, the company underwent a period of renewal following the arrival of Maryvonne Beyer, a former fashion model, who contributed to revitalising the workshops and reinforcing their position within the luxury sector.

In 2014, Lavabre Cadet was acquired by Camille Fournet, a Paris-based luxury leather goods manufacturer best known for high-end watch straps. The acquisition was intended to support Camille Fournet's expansion into glove-making while preserving Lavabre Cadet's artisanal production in Millau. Following the acquisition, production continued at the Millau workshop, which employed between four and five artisans at the time.

== Production and craftsmanship ==
Lavabre Cadet is located in Millau, a town historically recognised as a center of glove-making since the Middle Ages. It specialises in made-to-measure leather gloves produced entirely in its workshop. The company works primarily with lambskin and kidskin, sourced from regional suppliers, including the Alric tannery. The workshop also produces gloves using more exotic leathers such as peccary, python, and alligator. Production remains limited in scale and oriented toward custom orders for luxury fashion houses, including Dior, Chanel, Yves Saint Laurent, Givenchy, and Karl Lagerfeld.

The company has also been cited in media coverage as a preferred glove maker of designer Yves Saint Laurent (1936–2008), a reputation that contributed to its visibility within the luxury sector.

== See also ==
- Causse
