= Bell & Ross =

French luxury watchmaker noted for its Swiss-made chronographs

- Company type: Private
- Industry: Watch manufacturing
- Founded: 1992; 34 years ago, in Paris, France
- Founder: Bruno Belamich; Carlos Rosillo
- Headquarters: Paris, France
- Products: Wristwatches
- Website: www.bellross.com

Bell & Ross is a French watch company based in Paris with manufacturing in La Chaux-de-Fonds, Switzerland. Founded in 1992, the company has specialized in Swiss Made watches for professional users such as divers and pilots.

== History and production ==
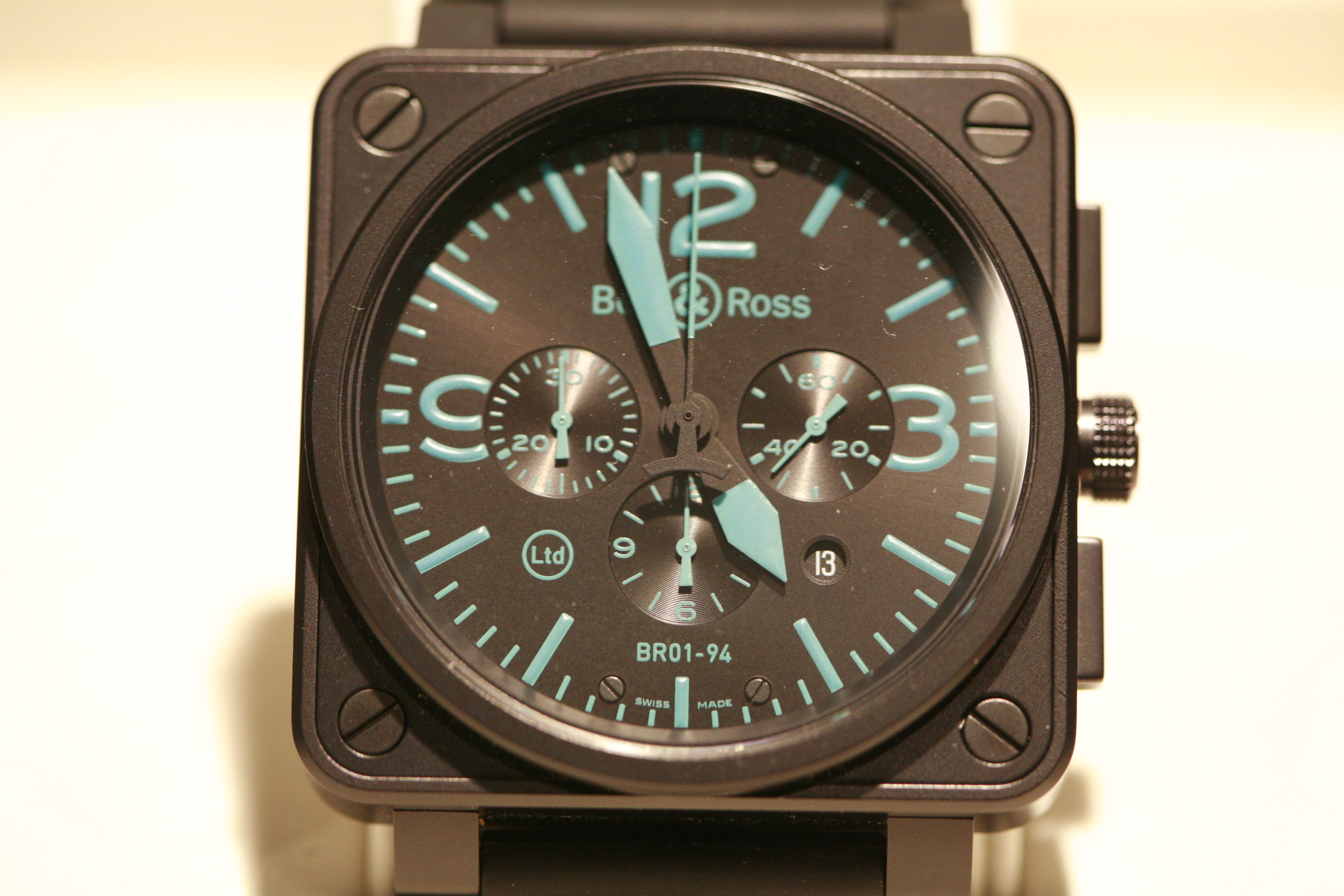
Bell & Ross BR01-94

Bell & Ross was founded in 1994 as a university project between Bruno Belamich (Bell) and Carlos A. Rosillo (Ross). The company's watches were originally produced by the German company Sinn, but the partnership was dissolved in 2002 soon after Chanel became a minority shareholder, and production was subsequently moved to Switzerland. Starting with its model BR-01 in 2005, the company began producing square watches meant to resemble instruments found in aircraft cockpits, The company's square-cased BR models became its most well-known design. The company divides production among three types of watches: Aviation, Marine and Vintage. The types of watches differ by the size and shape of the case, the movement, and the dial layout.

== Associations ==
The company is the official watch supplier to the Escadron de Chasse 2/4 La Fayette and the French space program.

In 2016, Bell & Ross began working with the Renault Sport Formula 1 Team. This partnership lead to Bell & Ross creating special edition timepieces to signify their relationship with Renault. As Renault rebranded to Alpine F1 Team, Bell & Ross remained with Renault and released the Alpine F1 Team Watch Collection.

== Records ==
In 1998 the Bell & Ross Hydromax 11 100 M set the Guinness World Record for wristwatch water-resistance at 11,000 metres below sea level.

== See also ==
- Baume et Mercier
- Breitling SA
- Omega SA
- TAG Heuer
- MB&F
- Chanel J12
