= Cruise collection =

Type of fashion line

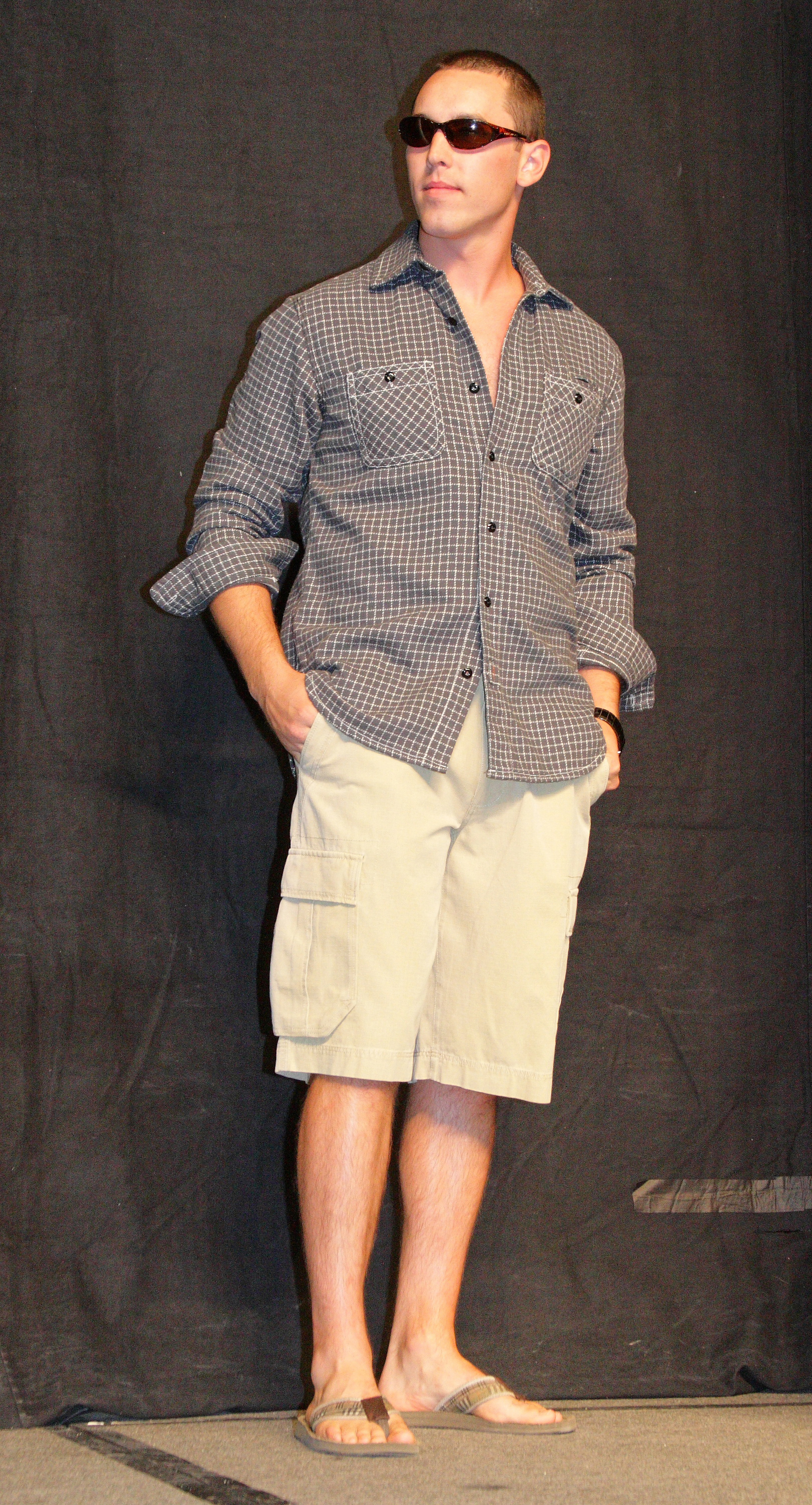
A man modelling resort wear

A cruise collection or resort collection or resort wear sometimes also holiday or travel collection (collection croisière in French), is an inter-season or pre-season line of ready-to-wear clothing produced by a fashion house or fashion brand in addition to the recurrent biannual seasonal collections — spring/summer and autumn (or fall)/winter — heralded at the fashion shows in New York, London, Paris, and Milan.

Originally meant for wealthy customers or "more seasoned jet-setters going on cruises (e.g. North Americans) or vacationing in the warm Mediterranean area (e.g. Europeans) during the winter months, cruise collections offer light spring or summer clothing when the weather at the points of sale actually calls for winter apparel. These days, they are targeted at customers who have "finished buying their fall wardrobes and are looking ahead to vacations". These "warm-weather designs [...] arrive in the shops in the US in November", after the autumn/winter collections and before the spring/summer collections, or generally between November/December and February in the Northern Hemisphere. In the high fashion retail landscape, often resort and cruise collections are more commercial expressions of ideas developed in Fall/Winter and Spring/Summer collections.

High fashion houses like Chanel, Dior, Gucci, Marc Jacobs, and Ralph Lauren offer cruise/resort collections. Although originally intended for women, lately many high fashion brands such as Dolce & Gabbana produce cruise and resort collections for men and women. Yves Saint-Laurent presented its first men's cruise collection in 2006 and has offered it every year since.

Across the fashion industry, "Resortwear" has been embraced as a specific product category. Several upstarts like Devereux have created entire brands around relaxed, resort-style athletic motifs. Resort wear is growing in popularity across the globe, especially in tourist destinations like Dubai, Costa Rica and the Greek Islands. It has become a cross-cultural style that signifies relaxation, affluence, and appreciation of nature which displays a sense of style to the wearer.

From walking shorts, caftans and sandals, to full-length evening dresses for women and light dinner jackets for men, resort wear is unique in its design and function. Resort wear is generally constructed with materials are easy to pack, lightweight, and breathable, such as cotton, silk, denim, linen, rayon, and poplin. It is often inspired by sailor and yachting themes, tropical motifs, mediterranean motifs, and classic Hawaiian prints of palm trees and hula girls. Often, the ensembles are accessorized with open toed shoes, large sunglasses, and wide brim hats.

Resort wear also encompasses swimsuits and bathing suit cover ups, with brands like KIINI specializing in this segment. Sometimes, brands such as RockyB Republik from Penang, Malaysia, BIASA from Bali, Psylo from Ko Samui, and Villebrequin from Saint Tropez will emerge from the very locations that resort wear is designed for and is worn year-round.

== See also ==
- List of fashion designers
- List of grands couturiers
- Fashion
- Fashion design
- Fashion Week
- Haute couture
