= Vamp Nail Polish =

Nail polish made by Chanel

Vamp nail polish (originally Rouge Noir), created in 1994, is a dark red and black nail polish made by Chanel. It was at one time Chanel's best-selling cosmetic and was, at the turn of the century, the fifth best selling nail polish in the world. Vamp has been credited with bringing dark, non-traditional polish colors into the mainstream of late twentieth century cosmetics.

== History ==
Vamp was created in 1994 by Dominique Moncourtois, Chanel's director of makeup creation. Moncourtois was inspired by Karl Lagerfeld, who asked him for a dark polish that would show up in the black and white photos that Lagerfeld was making to introduce his 1995 Spring/Summer Chanel Ready-to-wear collection. Moncourtois didn't have such a color, but he improvised with ordinary red polish covered with black marker ink and a clear top-coat.

According to the New York Times, the color "dominated the imagination of the masses" in 1994. The day after Lagerfeld's runway show, Madonna called Chanel's Paris office hoping to obtain some. By 1995, Chanel had diversified the concept into two similar shades as well as matching lipstick. These included a "purple and silvery" variety called "Metallic Vamp". The polish was priced at $15 a bottle and sold extremely well, with nationwide shortages for months after its introduction. It became Chanel's best selling product. By 1996, Newsweek was reporting that the color was "finally out of style", but even into 2000, it was the fifth best-selling nail polish in the world.

== Lasting effect on fashion ==
Before Chanel introduced Vamp, dark, non-traditional polish colors were shunned by mainstream cosmetics companies and their customers. Vamp was responsible for setting "in motion a widespread trend that made nail polish in virtually any color acceptable". According to Melinda Davis, the "extraordinary phenomenon of Vamp" was the fons et origo of a late twentieth century trend of "[a]n entire generation of wily, sexy women ... using a new category of 'black widow spider' cosmetics to express their sexual power". Chanel's introduction of Vamp has been credited with inspiring the foundation of a number of edgy new cosmetics lines in the late twentieth century, including Urban Decay and Hard Candy.

== In popular culture ==
Some sources claim that Uma Thurman wore Vamp in the 1994 film Pulp Fiction where, as Randy Laist notes, her character "manages to retain her deadly signification and support the narrative of danger that structures her date with Vincent, however, through the semantic value of her Chanel Vamp nail polish, the brand name of which refers back to a history of cinematic femmes fatales". These claims are unlikely as the movie was filmed a year before the polish was released. Madonna wore it in the December 1994 video of Take a Bow. By 1997, it was mentioned in "Welcome to the Hellmouth", the series premiere of Buffy the Vampire Slayer, as an archetypal example of something that was "Um, over? So over."
