= François Lesage =

French couture embroiderer

François Lesage (31 March 1929 – 1 December 2011) was a French couture embroiderer. Lesage was globally known in the art of embroidery and worked for the largest fashion and haute couture houses. His atelier is now part of Chanel through the company's subsidiary, Paraffection.

== Early life and background ==
Lesage, of Norman origin, was the son of Albert and Marie-Louise Lesage. He had an older brother, Jean-Louis, and a twin sister, Christiane. In 1924, Lesage's parents took over the workshop of the embroiderer Michonet. The workshop, founded in 1858, was known for working with Parisian theatrical costume designers and producing special orders for the court of Napoleon III. The atelier supplied the best-known figures in Parisian couture, from Worth to Paquin and Madeleine Vionnet. Albert Lesage's first career was as a broker in international trade. He was taken prisoner during World War I and began a new life in Chicago, where he was hired as director-designer of the women's clothing department at Marshall Field's in 1919. Returning to Paris three years later, Albert joined Michonet (who was looking for a successor). Marie-Louise was an assistant in charge of embroidery for Madeleine Vionnet. She and Albert met at Michonet's, where Yo (as she was nicknamed) was sent to oversee orders from the dressmaker. When they took over the Michonet business, it was renamed Albert Lesage et Cie. The new company diversified, developing its own collection of embroidered accessories and printed fabrics. Albert encouraged his son to serve an apprenticeship at his side. Although he inherited his father's gift for drawing, François was a talented colorist like his mother. After the end of World War II, he opened a studio on Sunset Boulevard in 1948. Lesage settled in Hollywood and created embroideries for film-studio couturiers. Albert's death a year later interrupted his plans, and he returned to France at age 20 to join his mother.

Lesage continuously expanded his collection of samples. Under his leadership, the maison became the preferred embroiderer of many fashion houses. "Embroidery is to haute couture what fireworks are to Bastille Day" was a maxim Lesage liked to repeat, summing up his philosophy about the craft. His boldness and imagination gradually opened the doors of international fashion, and American, Italian and Japanese designers drew on his talent. In 1987, a line of embroidered accessories was revived and sold in the Schiaparelli boutique on Place Vendôme.

== Maison Lesage ==
In the Art Nouveau and Art Deco styles, Albert and Marie-Louise Lesage expanded their catalog with avant-garde motifs which were sought by a clientele for whom fashion was nurtured by art. One, Elsa Schiaparelli, became a faithful customer and began ordering embroideries inspired by the circus, astrological signs and the marine world in 1936. A bolero ("Chevaux Savants" with rearing embroidered horses, from the summer 1938 collection), a cape embroidered with sun rays, and gilt sequins from the following winter highlight the collaboration between the designer and the craftsman. Until she closed her business in 1954, Elsa Schiaparelli gave Lesage all her embroidery work. Albert Lesage found exceptional materials: Murano glass for small flowers and imitation semi-precious stones, such as lapis lazuli, jade, turquoise rocks with black webbed patterns, artificial stones, pebbles and cabochons. He crushed gelatin sequins to give them the appearance of hammered coins, combined chenille and mink, and used metal blades and fish scales.

Lesage collaborated with Pierre Balmain, Cristóbal Balenciaga and Christian Dior, and Jacques Fath, Jacques Heim, Robert Piguet, Jacques Griffe, Jean Dessès, Hubert de Givenchy, Grès, Jean-Louis Scherrer and Marc Bohan (at Jean Patou) called on Maison Lesage. Like Schiaparelli, Yves Saint Laurent worked only with François Lesage after they met in 1963; their collaboration lasted 44 years.

Arguably the most famous are jackets with Vincent Van Gogh's Irises and Sunflowers for the summer 1988 collection, each of which required 600 hours of work. The iris jacket was made with 250,000 sequins in 22 colors, 200,000 beads and 250 metres (270 yd) of ribbon.

The 1980s began international collaborative relationships with Calvin Klein, Oscar de la Renta and Bill Blass. Karl Lagerfeld, who had just arrived at Chanel in France, began a professional relationship with Lesage in 1983. For Lagerfeld, Lesage was inspired by Boulle furniture and Chanel's Coromandel panels. Chanel had never wanted to work with Lesage, since Schiaparelli was a rival.

The Lesage archives are a source of inspiration for designers. A Vionnet sample was wanted by Azzedine Alaïa, for Dior by Galliano, and by Lagerfeld for Chanel. Each time, Lesage told them: "This is Vionnet."

Claude Montana at Lanvin, John Galliano for Dior, Thierry Mugler, Marc Jacobs (at Louis Vuitton) and Jean-Paul Gaultier called on Lesage and his embroiderers. Lesage creations include a dress with a panther-skin effect, embroidered with tubes in color gradients from beige to brown, for the Jean Paul Gaultier winter 1998 collection. A loyal customer and friend, Christian Lacroix never stopped calling on Maison Lesage: "It is he who gave me a taste for embroidery. He is my couture godfather." Lesage embroidered a "black tide" dress as a gift for the young designer Christian Le Drezen, who died in 2003. In the dress, crafted with bird feathers, shards of granite and seashells, Lesage wanted to commemorate the ecological disaster caused by the oil tanker Erika on the Brittany coast.

Although fashion was an essential part of Lesage's work, the embroidery atelier also carried out special orders. In 1997, for France's World Youth Day, Lesage embroidered Pope John Paul II's chasuble and mitre. Roman Polanski and Erik Orsenna asked him to embroider l'habit vert for their 1999 induction into the French Academy. Jean-Loup Dabadie did the same in 2008, and so did Simone Veil and Dominique Bona after that.

=== Awards and recognition ===
Lesage was celebrated in a 1988 monograph, "Haute Couture Embroidery: The Art of Lesage" by Palmer White. An exhibit paid tribute to his talent at the Palais Galliera in Paris and the Fashion Institute of Technology in New York (1987), the Fashion Foundation of Tokyo (1989) and the Los Angeles County Museum of Art (1991). Lesage received many awards: Regional Grand Prix for Arts Craftsmanship, the Medal of the City of Paris in 1984 and Knight of the Order of the Arts et Métiers (1985). He received the Grand Prix de la Création of the City of Paris (1989). In 1994 Lesage was made a Knight in the Order of the Legion of Honor, and was promoted to the rank of Officer in 2007. He received the rank of Commander in the Order of Arts and Letters (2003). The craft industry (the Métier) named him Master of the Art in November 2011, a few weeks before his death.
