= Virginie Viard =

French fashion designer

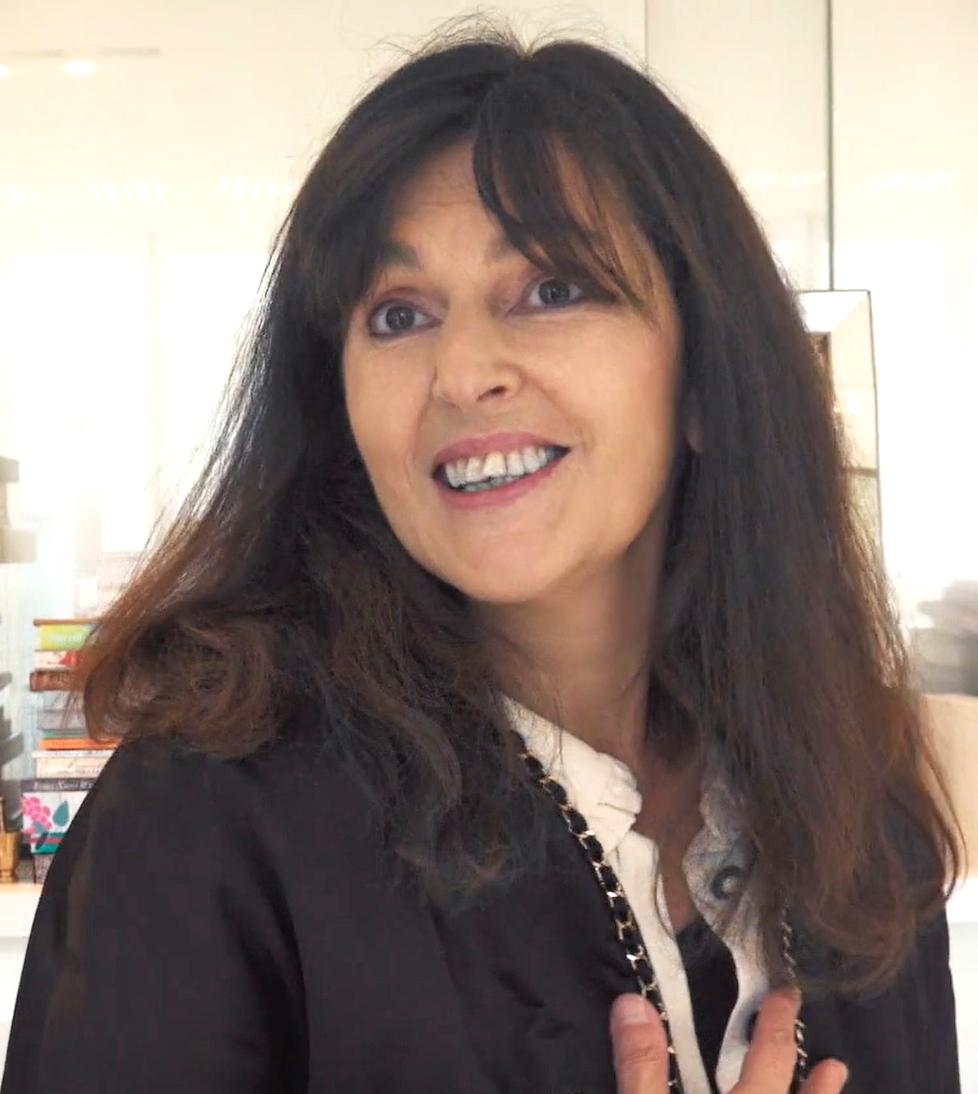
- Viard in 2020
- Born: 1962 (age 63–64); Dijon, France
- Occupation: Artistic Director
- Years active: 1987–present
- Agent: Chanel

Virginie Viard (born 1962) is a French fashion designer who was the creative director of Chanel from 2019 to 2024.

== Early life ==
Viard grew up in Dijon. Her father is a ski champion turned surgeon; her maternal grandparents were silk manufacturers.

Viard studied at Le Cours Georges, a fashion school in Lyon, where she specialized in film and theatrical costume. She spent a year in London.

== Career ==
Viard began her career as an assistant to costume designer Dominique Borg.

In 1987, Viard joined Chanel where she worked in embroidery. Thereafter, she followed Karl Lagerfeld to Chloé.

Viard left Chloé with Lagerfeld in 1997, returning to Chanel studio as director of the fashion design studio. In 2000, she became director of Chanel’s creation studio, where she oversaw the haute couture, ready-to-wear and accessories collections. She worked closely with Lagerfeld on all 10 collections that Chanel produces each year.

Beginning with the cruise 2019 show in late 2018, Chanel had Viard take a bow with Lagerfeld after the show, and, in January, she appeared solo at the end of the brand’s two haute couture shows, with the brand explaining that Lagerfeld was “tired.” She was appointed artistic director of Chanel fashion house in Paris from 2019, following Lagerfeld's death.

Viard's first solo collection was in Chanel's Resort / Cruise 2020 show, held in the Grand Palais, on May 3, 2019.

== Other activities ==
Viard designed the costumes for Krzysztof Kieślowski’s Three Colours: Blue (1993) and was in charge of the wardrobe for Three Colours: White (1994).

In 2015, when Lagerfeld accepted the role of creative director of the Hyères Festival, Viard presided over the fashion jury.

== Personal life ==
Viard has four siblings: Arnaud, Françoise, Marianne and Benjamin.

== Bibliography ==
Cruise 2019/20 Show - Cruise 2019/20 - accessed 2020-02-15
