= Paraffection =

- Industry: Fashion
- Founded: 1997
- Headquarters: Paris, France
- Key people: Dominique Barbiery, Director
- Parent: Chanel
- Subsidiaries: Desrues; Goossens; Guillet; Lemarié; Lesage; Massaro; Michel; Montex; Causse; Barrie; Les Ateliers Lognon; Lanel

Paraffection S.A. is a subsidiary of Chanel, established in 1985 to preserve and promote the heritage, craft and manufacturing skills of fashion artisan workshops. The specialist workshops continue to be independent and are therefore free to supply and collaborate with other houses. Dominique Barbiery was appointed Director of Paraffection in 2009.

In 1985 Chanel acquired the costume jewellery and button maker Desrues, and later the ateliers of Michel and Lemarié. Paraffection (which translates as 'for the love of') launched in 2002 with the acquisition of embroidery house Lesage and shoemaker Massaro. The establishment of the Métiers d’Arts collections showcases the work of the seven ateliers which made up Paraffection at that time and had collaborated with Chanel for decades.

As of 2015, Paraffection has acquired twelve Ateliers d’Art or workshops:

- Desrues – ornamentation and buttons (established 1887, acquired by Chanel in 1985)
- Michel – milliner (established 1936, acquired by Paraffection in 1996)
- Lemarié – feathers and camellias (established 1880, acquired 1996)
- Lesage – embroidery (established 1868, acquired 2002)
- Massaro – shoemaker (established 1947, acquired 2002)
- Goossens – gold and silversmith (established in the 1950s, acquired 2005)
- Guillet – maker of fabric flowers (established 1869, acquired 2006)
- Montex – embroidery (established 1939, acquired 2011)
- Causse – glovemaker (established 1892, acquired 2012)
- Barrie – a Scottish knitwear manufacturer (established in the 1870s, acquired 2012)
- Les Ateliers Lognon – pleater (established 1945, acquired 2013)
- Lanel – embroidery (established 1949, acquired by Lesage 2013)
