= Chanel J12 =

Luxury watch line

J12
- Manufacturer: Chanel
- Introduced: 1999

The J12 is a line of Swiss made luxury watches introduced in 1999 by French haute couture house Chanel. The J12 was launched in 1999 and is considered as a unisex watch. The watch was designed by the artistic director of the house, Jacques Hélleu, who found inspiration in the two worlds he loved most: automobiles and sailing. Chanel uses highly scratch-resistant ceramic for the watch's case and bracelet. Other materials are used as well, such as titanium and for one of the house's limited edition watches, sapphires were used to create the entirety of the bracelet and case.

== History ==
Chanel first stepped onto the horology scene in 1987 with the launch of its octagonal-case Première cocktail watch, created by Jacques Hélleu, who at that point had been the house's artistic director for nearly three decades. But it was the all-ceramic J12, released in 1999 and also designed by Hélleu, that saw Chanel firmly earn its seat at the table. Arnaud Chastaingt, who became director of Chanel's Watchmaking Creation Studio in 2013, calls the J12 "the first revolution of the watch world in the 21st century."

The J12 became the first timepiece that featured a unification of the masculine and feminine and defied gender norms when it comes to watchmaking. Traditionally, men's watches were bigger in size, more mechanically complex and held a more robust and sturdy appearance. Watches designed for women, however, fell more into the jewellery category – they were dainty, delicate and adorned in things that shimmer. The J12, however, was robust and versatile and suitable for so-called masculine activities, yet was still aesthetically pleasing. As it grew in popularity, Chanel horologists added more features typically reserved for male designs such as moon phases and chronographs. The release also marked the successful merging of high fashion and serious horology. When fashion brands tried to tap into the art previously, it had been more about mode than mechanics. With brands like Vacheron Constantin having centuries worth of a headstart in the trade, it was hard for other fashion-led brands to keep up.

In 2019, Chanel announced that the company purchased a 20% stake in Kenissi, a recently formed watch movement and component manufacturer, and around the same time Chanel also took a stake in F.P. Journe. The J12 is the first wristwatch equipped with the new Calibre 12.1 manufactured by Kenissi. The J12 was redesigned to celebrate its 20-year anniversary and was launched at Baselworld in March 2019.

== Slogan ==
"It's all about the seconds" is the official slogan for the J12, which was first used during relaunch ad campaign for its 20-year anniversary in 2019.

== The Calibre 12.1 ==
The Calibre 12.1 automatic movement is specially developed by Kenissi, the manufacturer behind Tudor Calibres MT5601 and MT5652. Tudor is a sister company to Rolex, founded by Hans Wilsdorf in 1926.

The Calibre 12.1 is a chronometer certified by COSC (Contrôle Officiel Suisse des Chronomètres) and offers a 70-hour power reserve. Approximately 80 percent of the movement's components are new and the watch features a finer bezel, reduced crown size and more. The new versions feature white hands for the black-dial watch and black hands for the white dial watch. The same year, Chanel was awarded for the new J12 with the Calibre 12.1 in the ladies category at the 2019 Fondation du grand prix d'horlogerie de Genève.

== Notable models ==
- In 2008, Chanel and Audemars Piguet developed the ceramic Chanel AP-3125 clockwork, exclusive to Chanel, taken from the AP-3120 movement used in the Royal Oak Offshore and other Royal Oak models. The Chanel reference model was H2129. The pair teamed up to create a very special limited-edition version of the Chanel J12 watch that contained an Audemars Piguet made movement called the Calibre 3125. Rather than being in black ceramic with steel, the watch was in polished black ceramic with 18k rose gold and a rear sapphire crystal window showcasing the in-house made AP automatic movement. The watch features a black sand-blasted high-tech ceramic and 18K yellow gold with a 60 hour power reserve. The rotor in black sand-blasted high-tech ceramic and 22K rhodium-plated yellow gold mounted on high-tech ceramic ball bearings and the case is a 42 mm diameter in black sand-blasted high-tech ceramic. The bezel is made of 18K yellow gold and black sand-blasted high-tech ceramic unidirectional with a Sapphire watch crystal and caseback. The bracelet is also made of black sand-blasted high-tech ceramic bracelet with 18K yellow gold triple-folding buckle clasp patented by CHANEL. It has a screw-down crown with a water-resistance 50 meters.
- The J12 Chromatic dive watch is available in 33mm quartz, and 38 and 41mm automatic. The movement of the J12 Chromatic is the tracteur ETA 2892, a resilient, accurate, easy to service, and thin watch movement which is the base for watches of other brands such as the Omega 1120 and IWC 30110. The titanium-infused ceramic is extremely strong and scratch-resistant. The hands are rhodium-plated for finish and corrosion resistance. It is dive rated to a 200m rating, meaning it is suitable for professional marine activity and skin diving, but not rated for scuba diving.
- The J12 Ganse has a white gold 38mm case and bracelet set with baguette-cut diamonds and rubies. The crown is topped with one round diamond.
- In 2017, the limited edition Mademoiselle J12 was launched at Baselworld. The watch is a tribute to Coco Chanel as she is featured in an animated version of herself wearing her synonymous jacket, skirt, two-toned pumps, a hat and finished with pearl earrings, which was her uniform for most of her life. Only 1,100 pieces were made (555 in black, 555 in white). The timepiece tells time by the way of her arms.
- The limited edition J12 X-Ray was launched in early 2020. Only 12 timepieces were made worldwide with an MSRP of $626,000. It features a 38mm x 10.7mm case entirely made of sapphire, a white gold bezel and a bracelet made entirely out of sapphires. Baguette-cut diamonds were used for the watch's indexes and has a water resistance of 30 meters.

== Current models ==
Model number	Model Name	Material	Bezel	Movement	Case Size	2021 USD MSRP
H5695	J12 watch	Black highly resistant ceramic and steel	Black steel unidirectional rotating bezel	High precision quartz movement	33mm x 12.94mm	$5,150
H5698	J12 watch	White highly resistant ceramic and steel	White steel unidirectional rotating bezel	High precision quartz movement	33mm x 12.94mm	$5,150
H5697	J12 watch	Black highly resistant ceramic and steel	Black steel unidirectional rotating bezel	Self-winding mechanical movement	38mm x 12.6mm	$6,200
H5700	J12 watch	White highly resistant ceramic and steel	White steel unidirectional rotating bezel	Self-winding mechanical movement	38mm x 12.6mm	$6,200
H6185	J12 Phantom watch	Black highly resistant ceramic and steel	Black steel unidirectional rotating bezel	Self-winding mechanical movement	38mm x 12.6mm	$7,100

== Limited models ==
Year released	Model number	Model Name	Special Feature	Case Size	MSRP	Image
2017	H5241	J12 Mademoiselle (Limited to 555 Pieces in Black and 555 Pieces in White)	Features an animated version of Coco Chanel with her arms pointing at the time	38mm x 10.7mm	$7,200	
2020	H6249	J12 X-Ray (Limited to 12 Pieces)	Sapphire Case with baguette-cut diamonds on a white gold bezel with a Sapphire bracelet	38mm x 10.7mm	$626,000	
2020	H6476	J12.20 (Limited to 2020 Pieces)	White lacquered dial with rhodium coated Chanel motifs and symbols	38mm x 10.7mm	$7,200	
2020	H6478	J12 Mademoiselle Act 2 (Limited to 20 Pieces)	Charm resembling Coco Chanel fastened to the watch crown, dressed in a suit embellished with 224 diamonds. Bezel set with 46 baguette-cut diamonds weighing 3.90 carats, and a dial graced by 12 diamond indexes.	38mm x 10.7mm	Unknown	
2020	H6500	J12 Paradoxe Diamonds (Limited to 20 Pieces)	Watch is set with approximately 4.5 carats of baguette-cut diamonds with an 18k white gold triple-folding buckle	38mm x 10.7mm	$192,600	

== Marketing ==
The Chanel J12 worn by celebrities including Alessandra Ambrosio, Lindsay Lohan, Scarlett Johansson, Blake Lively, Anna Kournikova and Stephanie Pratt.

In 2019, Chanel relaunched the J12 for its 20-year anniversary with an ad campaign featuring Naomi Campbell, Lily-Rose Depp, Keira Knightley, Claudia Schiffer, and Liu Wen.

In 2021, Chanel released Eternal Instant, a coffee table book that shows the 20 year history of the watch.

== See also ==
- Chanel 2.55
- Karl Lagerfeld
- Manufacture d'horlogerie
