= Robert Goossens =

French jeweller

Robert Goossens (30 January 1927 – 7 January 2016) was a French jeweller who became known as Monsieur Bijou. The son of a metal foundry worker, he was born in Paris, France. In his younger years, he served an apprenticeship in jewelry making, perfecting the techniques of casting, engraving, and embossing semi-precious and simulated stones into gold and silver metals. In his decades of creating fine jewelry, Goossens mixed the genuine stones with the fakes, a blend of the artificial gems with the semi-precious for clients including Coco Chanel, Cristóbal Balenciaga, Yves Saint Laurent, Madame Grès, Christian Dior and others.

== Design Aesthetic ==
Goossens's designs were heavily influenced by paintings and artifacts in Paris museums, with inspiration most often taken from Maltese, Byzantium, and Renaissance works. Over the years, he traveled extensively, frequently bringing back stones including sapphires, amethysts, rubies, coral, and chalcedony. Concerning rock crystal, after restoring a cross belonging to Madame Chanel, the stone became his favorite material. It is a clear and colorless variety of quartz. Goossens became the first to set it into pieces of jewelry; he felt that its delicate and inexpensive attributes were well suited to costume jewelry. He also utilized bronze, shells, pearls, colored and, as mentioned, natural rock crystal in necklace, brooch, bracelet and earring designs.

== Work with the Maison Chanel ==
Starting in 1954 with his creation of the Byzantine style, Goossens worked with Coco Chanel to design jewelry to accompany her fashion designs, mostly through presentations where she would guide his inspiration. Chanel herself loved to blend the rich with the poor, and Goossens's creations were entirely in keeping with that approach. Notable work during his tenure at Chanel includes silver and gold plated pins set with emeralds, moon earth pendants, and crystal Byzantine crosses.

Goossens would create original pieces for Chanel herself made of real gold and genuine stones, which in turn were copied as imitations designed for fashion shows and presentations. These models ultimately served as the basis for Chanel's costume jewelry designs.

Goossens continued his work with the Maison Chanel after its founder's passing, and collaborated with her successor Karl Lagerfeld throughout the 1980s and 1990s to create costume jewelry for the Maison Chanel's ready-to-wear and couture collections. Chanel bought Goossens's workshop in 2005.

Goossen's workshop north of Paris is still operating to this day, employing about 50 people to handcraft his designs. The Goossens boutique is located in Paris on the avenue George V.

Some of his works are part of the Musée des Arts Décoratifs collections. He died at the age of 88.

== Bibliography ==
- Gilles Plazy, Chantal Bizot, Bijoux de Haute Couture, Collection Robert Goossens, Paris: Plume, 2000
- Patrick Mauriès, Maison Goossens: Haute Couture Jewelry, London: Thames & Hudson, 2014 | ISBN 0500517703 | ISBN 978-0500517703
