= Pot marjoram =

Pot marjoram is a common name for a number of species of Origanum used as herbs, including:

- Origanum onites, found in Sicily, Greece, and Turkey
- Origanum majorana, often just called marjoram
