= Rigano =

Surname that originated from Italy

Rìgano is a Sicilian surname, which came from Sicilian word rìganu (oregano). Riganò is a surname mostly from southern Calabria, Italy. Another surname, Rigani, also derived from marjoram (oregano).

== Notables ==
Rìgano, Riganò or Rigano may refer to:

- Christian Riganò, Italian football manager and former professional footballer, born in Sicily, Italy
- Joseph Rigano, American character actor
- Cliff Rigano, a member of the music band Dry Kill Logic

== See also ==
- Origanum onites
