= Marjoram (disambiguation) =

Marjoram is a somewhat cold-sensitive perennial herb.

Marjoram may also refer to:

- Kahlua/Tequila Marjoram, a character in the game and anime Galaxy Angel
- Pot marjoram, a common name for Origanum onites
- Adam Marjoram (born 1993), an Australian racing driver
