= Hyalorista opalizalis =

Scientific classification
- Kingdom: Animalia
- Phylum: Arthropoda
- Clade: Pancrustacea
- Class: Insecta
- Order: Lepidoptera
- Family: Crambidae
- Genus: Hyalorista
- Species: H. opalizalis

Binomial name
- Hyalorista opalizalis (Guenée, 1854))

Synonyms
- Rhodaria opalizalis Guenée, 1854; Botys syphaxalis Walker, 1859; Pionea opalisalis Hampson, 1899; Hyalorista syphacalis (misspelling)

Species of moth

Hyalorista opalizalis is a pyraloid moth in the subfamily Pyraustinae of the family Crambidae. It was described in 1854 by the French entomologist Achille Guenée based on two male and two female adult specimens collected in Brazil.

In 1995, the species was transferred to its current generic placement in the genus Hyalorista.

Hyalorista opalizalis is found in Honduras and Brazil. The larvae are recorded from two host plant species in the family Lamiaceae: Ocimum basilicum and Origanum majorana.
