= Hyalorista taeniolalis =

Scientific classification
- Kingdom: Animalia
- Phylum: Arthropoda
- Class: Insecta
- Order: Lepidoptera
- Family: Crambidae
- Genus: Hyalorista
- Species: H. taeniolalis

Binomial name
- Hyalorista taeniolalis (Guenée, 1854)

Synonyms
- Rhodaria taeniolalis Guenée, 1854; Rhodaria directalis Walker, 1866

Species of moth

Hyalorista taeniolalis is a moth in the family Crambidae. It was described by Achille Guenée in 1854. It is found in French Guiana and Brazil.
