= Pogostemon rajendranii =

Conservation status
- Vulnerable (IUCN 3.1)

Scientific classification
- Kingdom: Plantae
- Clade: Tracheophytes
- Clade: Angiosperms
- Clade: Eudicots
- Clade: Asterids
- Order: Lamiales
- Family: Lamiaceae
- Genus: Pogostemon
- Species: P. rajendranii

Binomial name
- Pogostemon rajendranii R.Sasi & R.Sival. 2012

Species of plant

Pogostemon rajendranii is a short, lithophytic herb from the genus Pogostemon and subgenus Allopogostemon. It was discovered in the Thalai Kundah region of the Nilgiri Mountains, India and appears to be endemic to that area. It is closely related to Pogostemon vestitus, from the same region.

== Description ==
Pogostemon rajendranii grows up to 10-15 cm tall. Its stems have distinctive pinkish hairs that turn golden-yellow when dry. It has white flowers that occur as an inflorescence, of up to 3.5cm long. As a lithophyte, it grows on dry rock crevices. Going by its exclusive discovery in Thalai Kundah, which is at an altitude of 2209m, it is currently thought to prefer the distinctive Tropical Montane Forests and Montane Tropical Climate of that region. It has currently not been found in any other region.
