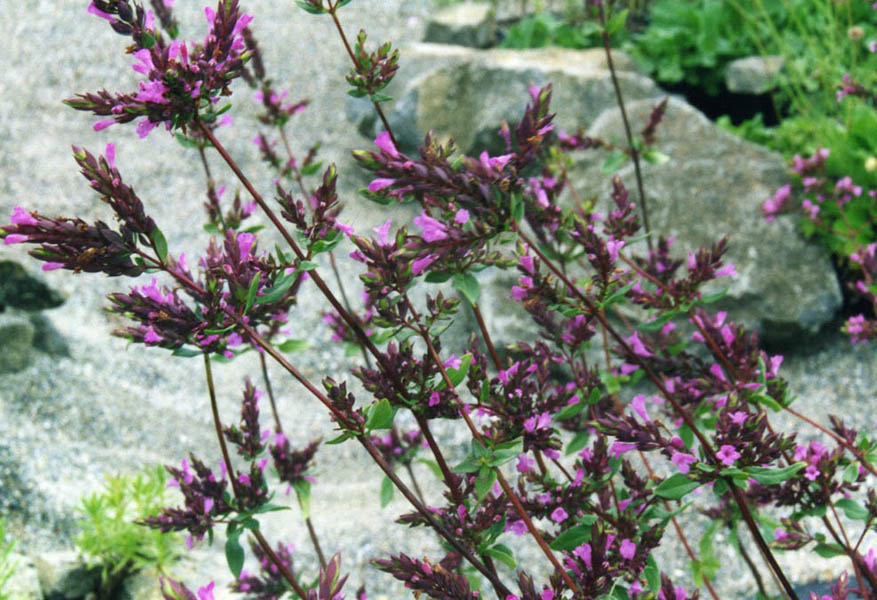

Scientific classification
- Kingdom: Plantae
- Clade: Embryophytes
- Clade: Tracheophytes
- Clade: Angiosperms
- Clade: Eudicots
- Clade: Asterids
- Order: Lamiales
- Family: Lamiaceae
- Genus: Origanum
- Species: O. laevigatum

Binomial name
- Origanum laevigatum Boiss.

= Origanum laevigatum =

Species of flowering plant

Origanum laevigatum is a species of flowering plant in the family Lamiaceae, native to Cyprus, Syria, and Turkey. Growing to 50–60 cm (20–24 in) tall by 45 cm (18 in) wide, it is a woody-based perennial, with strongly aromatic leaves, and loose clusters of pink funnel-shaped flowers with persistent purple bracts, throughout the summer.

This plant is used as a culinary herb, as an ornamental plant in herb gardens, and as groundcover in sunny, well-drained situations. It tolerates poor soil, but dislikes winter wetness. The species, and the cultivars 'Rosenkuppel' and 'Herrenhausen' have gained the Royal Horticultural Society's Award of Garden Merit.
