= Hyalorista limasalis =

Scientific classification
- Kingdom: Animalia
- Phylum: Arthropoda
- Class: Insecta
- Order: Lepidoptera
- Family: Crambidae
- Genus: Hyalorista
- Species: H. limasalis

Binomial name
- Hyalorista limasalis (Walker, 1866)

Synonyms
- Scopula limasalis Walker, 1866

Species of moth

Hyalorista limasalis is a moth in the family Crambidae. It is found in Honduras.
