= Origanum cordifolium =

Scientific classification
- Kingdom: Plantae
- Clade: Tracheophytes
- Clade: Angiosperms
- Clade: Eudicots
- Clade: Asterids
- Order: Lamiales
- Family: Lamiaceae
- Genus: Origanum
- Species: O. cordifolium

Binomial name
- Origanum cordifolium (Montbret & Aucher ex Benth.) Vogel

Species of shrub

Origanum cordifolium is a subshrub with suberect, cylindrical, hairless, often purplish shoots, 40–60 cm high. Leaves opposite, simple, entire or irregularly dentate, stalkless, ovoid to cordate, 1–2 x 0.8–2 cm, leathery, hairless, acute. Flowers on pendulous spikes, zygomorphic, corolla bifid, whitish or pinkish, 1–4, subtended by purplish-green, large bracts. Flowers June–August. Fruit of 4 nutlets.

== Habitat ==
Moist, shady rocky slopes, by streams and roadbanks on igneous rocks at 300–900 m.

== Distribution ==
It is endemic to Cyprus and found In a limited area of the Paphos Forest in Roudhia Valley (Alonoudhi, Steni, etc.)
