= Pogostemon guamensis =

Scientific classification
- Kingdom: Plantae
- Clade: Tracheophytes
- Clade: Angiosperms
- Clade: Eudicots
- Clade: Asterids
- Order: Lamiales
- Family: Lamiaceae
- Genus: Pogostemon
- Species: P. guamensis

Binomial name
- Pogostemon guamensis Lorence & W.L.Wagner

Species of plant

Pogostemon guamensis is a rare plant in the Lamiaceae family (sages and mints) that is endemic only to the limestone cliffs surrounding Anderson Airforce Base on the island of Guam. The species was first described in the scientific literature in 2021. Although it is in the same genus as the fragrant herb patchouli (Pogostemon cablin), Pogostemon guamensis is relatively odorless.
