= Hyalorista =

Scientific classification
- Domain: Eukaryota
- Kingdom: Animalia
- Phylum: Arthropoda
- Class: Insecta
- Order: Lepidoptera
- Family: Crambidae
- Subfamily: Pyraustinae
- Genus: Hyalorista; Warren, 1892

Synonyms
- Pyraustopsis Amsel, 1956

Genus of moths

Hyalorista is a genus of moths of the family Crambidae.

== Species ==
- Hyalorista exuvialis (Guenée, 1854)
- Hyalorista imitans Warren, 1892
- Hyalorista limasalis (Walker, 1866)
- Hyalorista opalizalis (Guenée, 1854)
- Hyalorista taeniolalis (Guenée, 1854)
