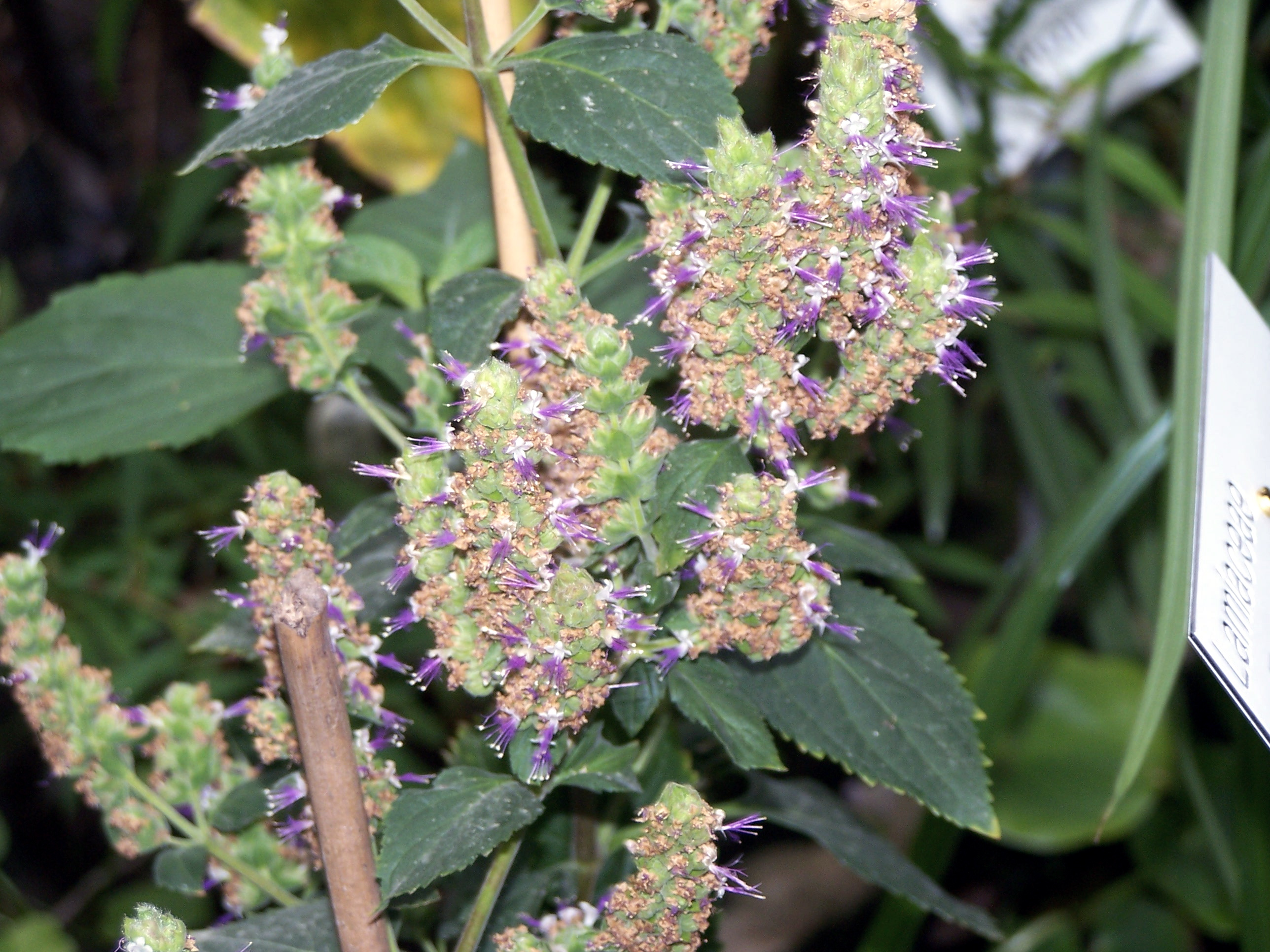
- Pogostemon cablin

Scientific classification
- Kingdom: Plantae
- Clade: Tracheophytes
- Clade: Angiosperms
- Clade: Eudicots
- Clade: Asterids
- Order: Lamiales
- Family: Lamiaceae
- Subfamily: Lamioideae
- Genus: Pogostemon; Desf.

Synonyms
- Wensea J.C.Wendl.; Dysophylla Blume; Chotekia Opiz & Corda; Eusteralis Raf.; Dysophylla El Gazzar & L.Watson ex Airy Shaw 1967 not Blume 1826; Anuragia Raizada illegitimate name

= Pogostemon =

Genus of plants

Pogostemon is a large genus from the family Lamiaceae, first described as a genus in 1815. It is native to warmer parts of Asia, Africa, and Australia.

The best known member of this genus is patchouli, Pogostemon cablin, widely cultivated in Asia for its scented foliage, used for perfume, incense, insect repellent, herbal tea, etc. In 1997, it was proposed for the genus to be split into three subgenera— Allopogostemon Bhatti & Ingr., Dysophyllus (Blume) Bhatti & Ingr., and Pogostemon sensu Bhatti & Ingr. based on numerous morphological characteristics. However, the significant variability in these traits as well as possible convergent evolution within this genus has made classification of species challenging. Some members of the genus (e.g. Pogostemon erectus, Pogostemon stellatus, Pogostemon helferi) are grown ornamentally in the aquarium hobby and are used for aquascaping.

== Selected species ==
Species include:

- Pogostemon amaranthoides Benth.
- Pogostemon andersonii (Prain) Panigrahi
- Pogostemon aquaticus (C.H.Wright) Press
- Pogostemon atropurpureus Benth.
- Pogostemon auricularius (L.) Hassk. - southeast Asia
- Pogostemon barbatus Bhoti & Ingr.
- Pogostemon benghalensis (Burm.f.) Kuntze
- Pogostemon brachystachyus Benth.
- Pogostemon brevicorollus Y.Z.Sun
- Pogostemon cablin (Blanco) Benth. - South Asia & southeast Asia
- Pogostemon championii Prain
- Pogostemon chinensis C.Y.Wu & Y.C.Huang
- Pogostemon crassicaulis (Benth.) Press
- Pogostemon cristatus Hassk.
- Pogostemon cruciatus (Benth.) Kuntze
- Pogostemon dasianus A.B.De & Mukerjee
- Pogostemon deccanensis (Panigrahi) Press
- Pogostemon dielsianus Dunn
- Pogostemon elatispicatus Bhoti & Ingr.
- Pogostemon elsholtzioides Benth.
- Pogostemon erectus (Dalzell) Kuntze
- Pogostemon esquirolii (H.Lév.) C.Y.Wu & Y.C.Huang
- Pogostemon falcatus (C.Y.Wu) C.Y.Wu & H.W.Li
- Pogostemon formosanus Oliv. - Taiwan
- Pogostemon fraternus Miq.
- Pogostemon gardneri Hook.f.
- Pogostemon glaber Benth.
- Pogostemon glabratus Chermsir. ex Press
- Pogostemon globulosus Phuong ex Suddee & A.J.Paton
- Pogostemon griffithii Prain
- Pogostemon guamensis Lorence & W.L.Wagner - Guam
- Pogostemon hedgei V.S.Kumar & B.D.Sharma
- Pogostemon helferi (Hook.f.) Press
- Pogostemon heyneanus Benth. - South Asia & southeast Asia
- Pogostemon hirsutus Benth.
- Pogostemon hispidocalyx C.Y.Wu & Y.C.Huang
- Pogostemon hispidus (Benth.) Prain
- Pogostemon kachinensis (Mukerjee) Panigrahi
- Pogostemon koehneanus (Muschl.) Press
- Pogostemon linearis (Benth.) Kuntze
- Pogostemon litigiosus Doan ex Suddee & A.J.Paton
- Pogostemon lythroides (Diels) Press
- Pogostemon macgregorii W.W.Sm.
- Pogostemon manipurensis V.S.Kumar
- Pogostemon membranaceus Merr.
- Pogostemon menthoides Blume
- Pogostemon micangensis G.Taylor
- Pogostemon mollis Benth.
- Pogostemon mutamba (Hiern) G.Taylor
- Pogostemon myosuroides (Roth) Kuntze
- Pogostemon nelsonii Doan ex Suddee & A.J.Paton
- Pogostemon nepetoides Stapf
- Pogostemon nigrescens Dunn
- Pogostemon nilagiricus Gamble
- Pogostemon paludosus Benth. - southern India
- Pogostemon paniculatus (Willd.) Benth.
- Pogostemon parviflorus Benth.
- Pogostemon peethapushpum Pradeep
- Pogostemon peguanus (Prain) Press
- Pogostemon pentagonus (C.B.Clarke ex Hook.f.) Kuntze
- Pogostemon petiolaris Benth.
- Pogostemon philippinensis S.Moore
- Pogostemon plectrantoides Desf.
- Pogostemon pressii Panigrahi
- Pogostemon pubescens Benth.
- Pogostemon pumilus (Graham) Press
- Pogostemon purpurascens Dalzell
- Pogostemon quadrifolius (Benth.) F.Muell.
- Pogostemon raghavendranii R.Murugan & Livingst.
- Pogostemon rajendranii Ramasamy
- Pogostemon reflexus Benth.
- Pogostemon reticulatus Merr.
- Pogostemon rogersii N.E.Br.
- Pogostemon rotundatus Benth.
- Pogostemon rugosus (Hook.f.) El Gazzar & L.Watson
- Pogostemon rupestris Benth.
- Pogostemon salicifolius (Dalzell ex Hook.f.) El Gazzar & L.Watson
- Pogostemon sampsonii (Hance) Press
- Pogostemon septentrionalis C.Y.Wu & Y.C.Huang
- Pogostemon speciosus Benth.
- Pogostemon stellatus (Lour.) Kuntze - southeast Asia, southern China, northern Australia
- Pogostemon stocksii (Hook.f.) Press
- Pogostemon strigosus (Benth.) Benth.
- Pogostemon szemaoensis (C.Y.Wu & S.J.Hsuan) Press
- Pogostemon tisserantii (Pellegr.) Bhoti & Ingr.
- Pogostemon travancoricus Bedd.
- Pogostemon trinervis Chermsir. ex Press
- Pogostemon tuberculosus Benth.
- Pogostemon velatus Benth.
- Pogostemon vestitus Benth.
- Pogostemon villosus (Roxb.) Benth.
- Pogostemon wattii C.B.Clarke
- Pogostemon wightii Benth.
- Pogostemon williamsii Elmer
- Pogostemon xanthiifolius C.Y.Wu & Y.C.Huang
- Pogostemon yatabeanus (Makino) Press
