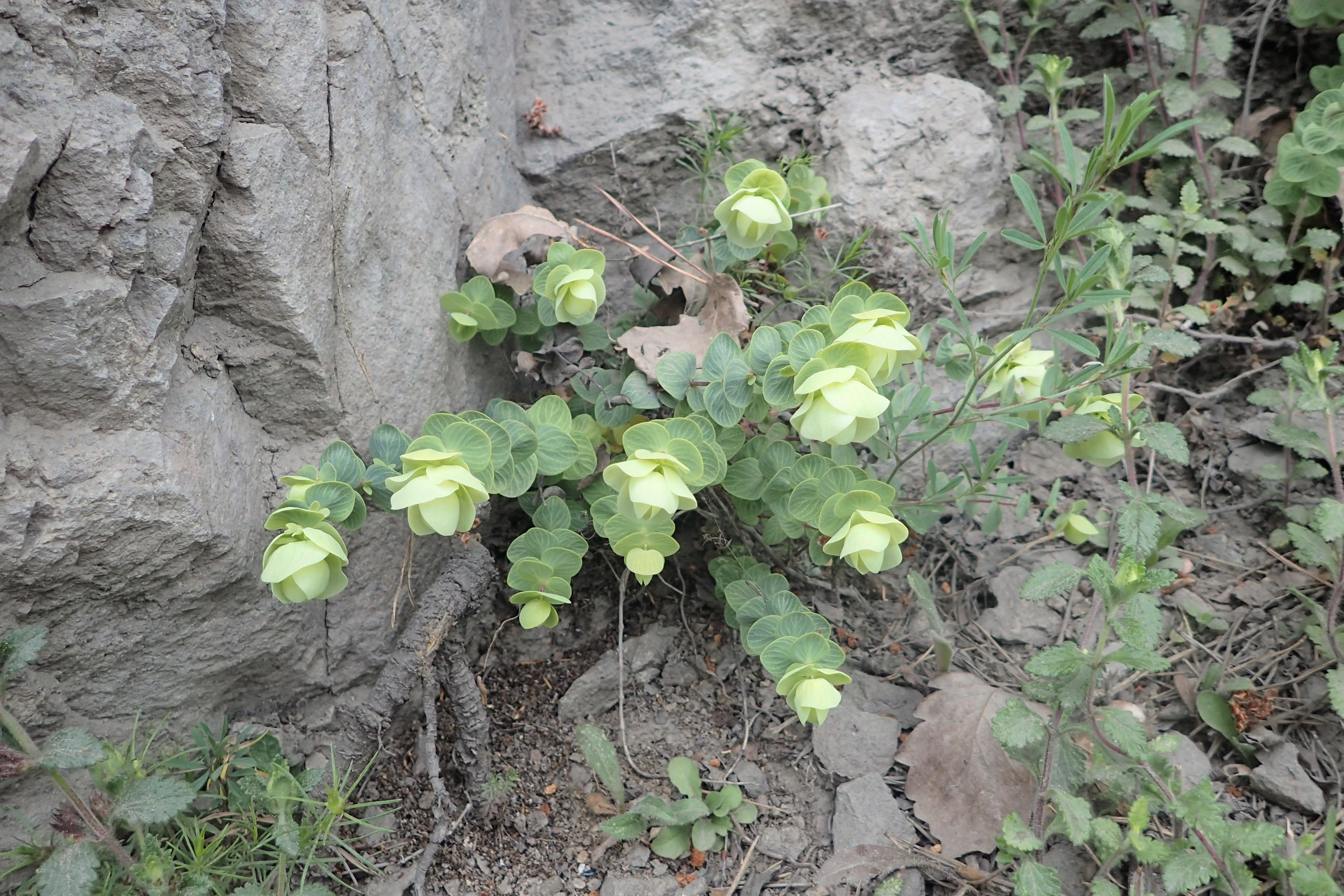
- Khulo, Georgia

Scientific classification
- Kingdom: Plantae
- Clade: Embryophytes
- Clade: Tracheophytes
- Clade: Angiosperms
- Clade: Eudicots
- Clade: Asterids
- Order: Lamiales
- Family: Lamiaceae
- Genus: Origanum
- Species: O. rotundifolium

Binomial name
- Origanum rotundifolium Boiss.

Synonyms
- Amaracus rotundifolius (Boiss.) Briq.

= Origanum rotundifolium =

Species of flowering plant

Origanum rotundifolium, the round-leaved oregano, is a species of flowering plant in the family Lamiaceae, native to Turkey, Armenia and Georgia. It is a small woody-based perennial or subshrub growing to 10–30 cm (4–12 in) tall by 30 cm (12 in) wide, with strongly aromatic leaves, and loose clusters of pink flowers with hop-like pale green bracts, throughout the summer.

The specific epithet rotundifolium means "round-leaved".

This plant is used as a culinary herb, as an ornamental plant in herb gardens and as groundcover in sunny, well-drained situations. It prefers alkaline soil, and dislikes winter wetness. It has gained the Royal Horticultural Society's Award of Garden Merit.
