= Origanum × hybridum =

Scientific classification
- Kingdom: Plantae
- Clade: Tracheophytes
- Clade: Angiosperms
- Clade: Eudicots
- Clade: Asterids
- Order: Lamiales
- Family: Lamiaceae
- Genus: Origanum
- Species: O. × hybridum

Binomial name
- Origanum × hybridum Mill.

Synonyms
- Amaracus × pulchellus (Boiss.) Briq.; Origanum × pulchellum Boiss.

Species of flowering plant

Origanum × hybridum, synonym Origanum × pulchellum, is an ornamental plant of hybrid origin. Its two parents are O. dictamnus and O. sipyleum. It is known as the showy marjoram or the showy oregano.
