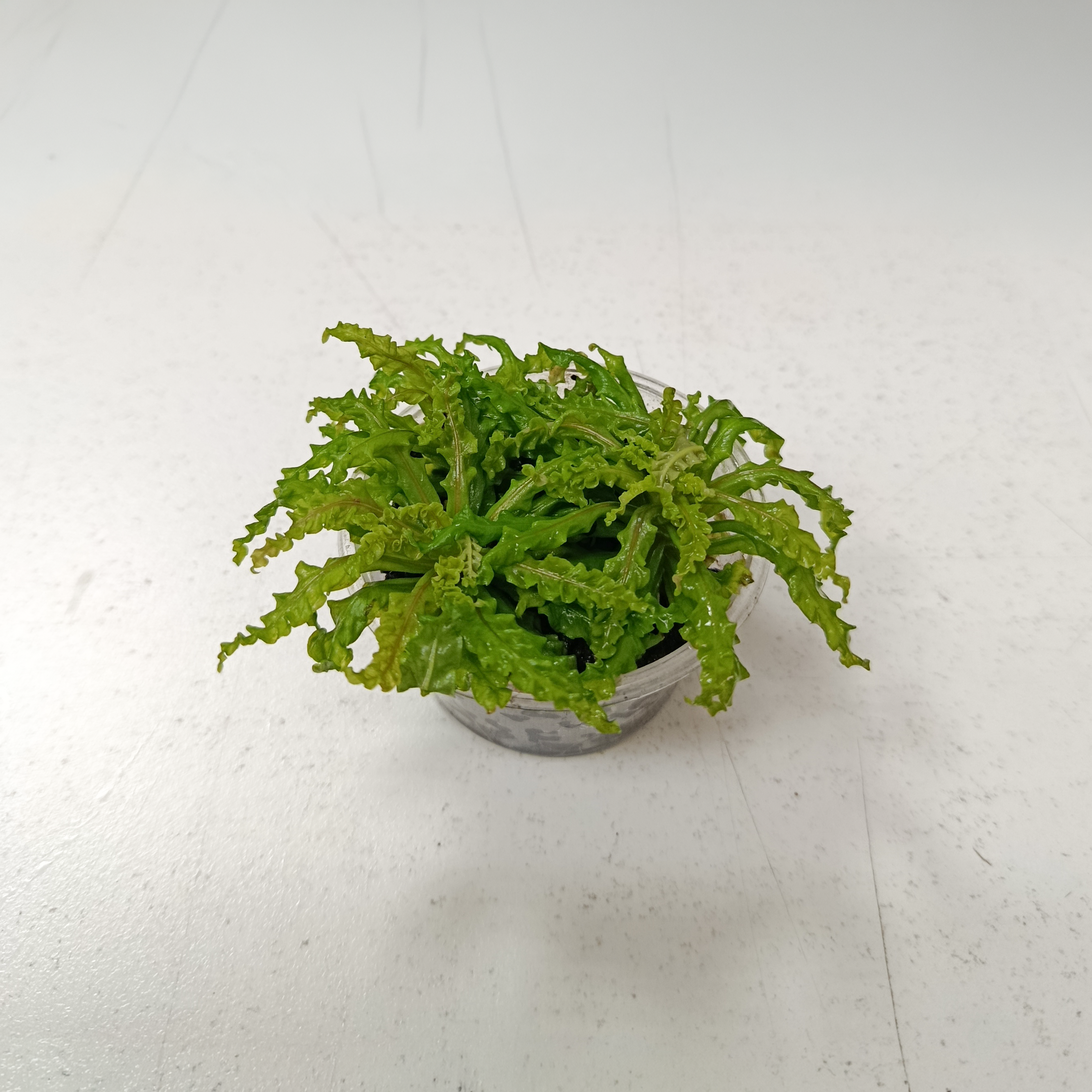

Scientific classification
- Kingdom: Plantae
- Clade: Embryophytes
- Clade: Tracheophytes
- Clade: Spermatophytes
- Clade: Angiosperms
- Clade: Eudicots
- Clade: Asterids
- Order: Lamiales
- Family: Lamiaceae
- Genus: Pogostemon
- Species: P. helferi

Binomial name
- Pogostemon helferi Hook.f.

= Pogostemon helferi =

Species of aquatic plant

Pogostemon helferi, also known as dao-noi, is a species of Thai aquatic plant. It is a common ornamental plant in aquariums.

== Taxonomy ==
The type locality is Sangkhla Buri district, Kanchanaburi, Thailand.

== Distribution ==
Pogostemon helferi is distributed across Myanmar and western Thailand. A 2005 survey conducted in Thailand found the species in north, north-east, east, and west Thailand. However, a 2007 survey found the species only in the Kanchanaburi province, found near Myanmar. A 2024 review found the species distribution extending to the Indian Himalayan Region.

Because of the high demand for the plants in aquarium trade, the species has been declining in population in its natural habitat, potentially facing local extinction.

== Description ==
Pogostemon helferi is a common ornamental plant. It is commonly known by its local name, dao-noi, meaning "little star". It is a popular plant in aquariums, and is of high demand in the aquarium trade. As of 2016, the economic value of the production of the species was valued at ฿252,000 whilst the annual market demand was more than ฿500,000.

The species has dimorphic leaves, two distinct types, the first being emerged, which are less durable, and submerged. It has irregularly shaped epidermis cells. Most stocks of the species are harvested from the wild.
