= Hyalorista imitans =

Scientific classification
- Domain: Eukaryota
- Kingdom: Animalia
- Phylum: Arthropoda
- Class: Insecta
- Order: Lepidoptera
- Family: Crambidae
- Genus: Hyalorista
- Species: H. imitans

Binomial name
- Hyalorista imitans Warren, 1892

Species of moth

Hyalorista imitans is a moth in the family Crambidae. It was described by Warren in 1892. It is found in Brazil (São Paulo).
