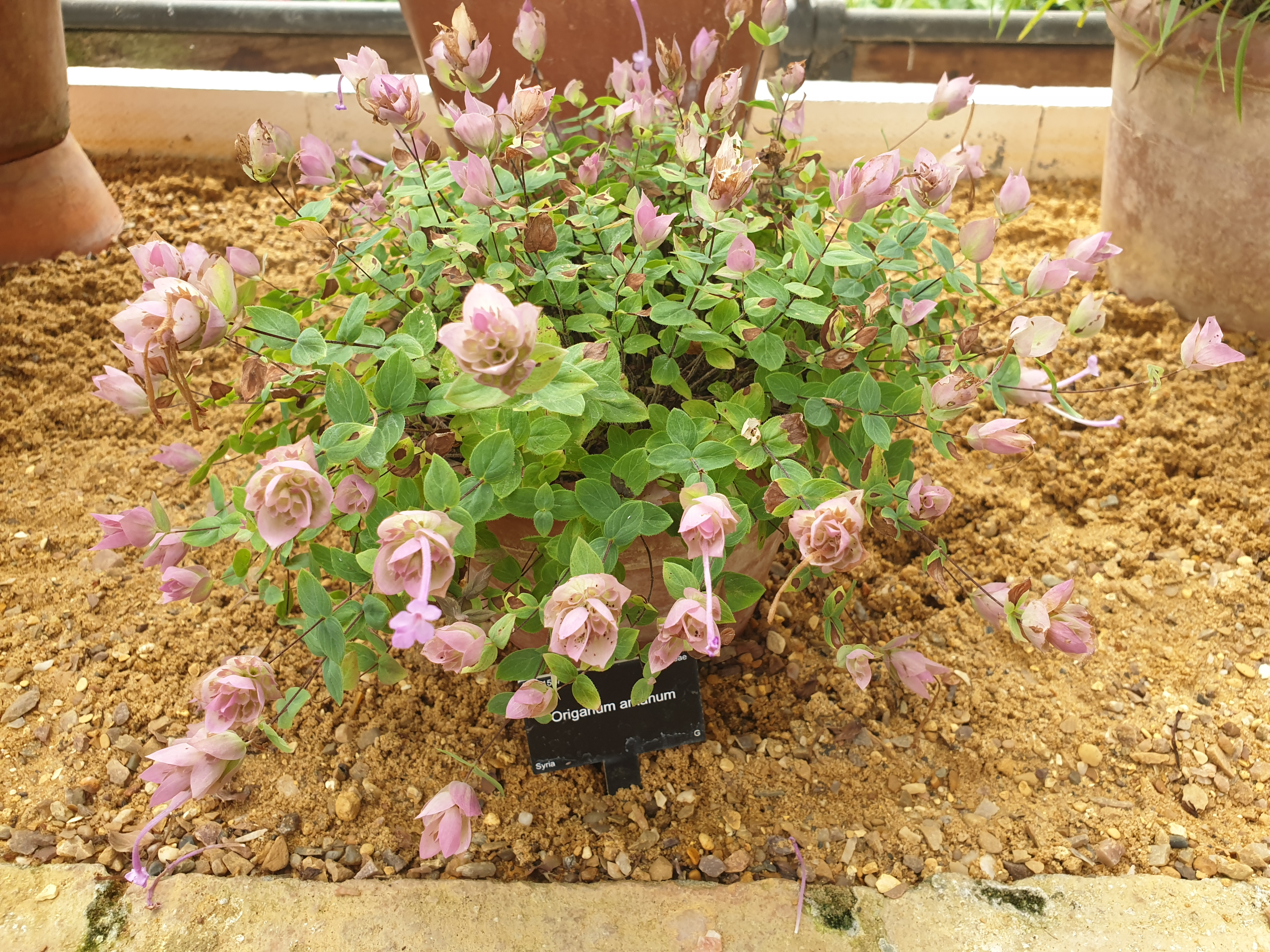
- Origanum amanum at the Cambridge University Botanic Garden, England

Scientific classification
- Kingdom: Plantae
- Clade: Tracheophytes
- Clade: Angiosperms
- Clade: Eudicots
- Clade: Asterids
- Order: Lamiales
- Family: Lamiaceae
- Genus: Origanum
- Species: O. amanum

Binomial name
- Origanum amanum Post

= Origanum amanum =

Species of flowering plant

Origanum amanum, the Amanum oregano, is a species of flowering plant in the family Lamiaceae, native to the Hatay Province of southern Turkey, bordering on Syria. It is an evergreen subshrub growing to 10–20 cm (4–8 in) tall by 30 cm (12 in) wide, with strongly aromatic leaves, and clusters of pink funnel-shaped flowers in summer and autumn.

This plant is used as a culinary herb and as ornamental groundcover in sunny, well-drained situations. Preferring alkaline soil, it tolerates poor soil but dislikes winter wetness. It has gained the Royal Horticultural Society's Award of Garden Merit.

The specific epithet amanum refers to the Amanus Mountains in Turkey, where the plant is found.
