= Pogostemon formosanus =

Scientific classification
- Kingdom: Plantae
- Clade: Tracheophytes
- Clade: Angiosperms
- Clade: Eudicots
- Clade: Asterids
- Order: Lamiales
- Family: Lamiaceae
- Genus: Pogostemon
- Species: P. formosanus

Binomial name
- Pogostemon formosanus Oliv.

Species of herb

Pogostemon formosanus is a plant species in the family Lamiaceae, first described in 1896. The species is endemic to the island of Taiwan.

Pogostemon formosanus are herbs or suffruticose plants, growing up to 1 m tall and covered with septate hairs; the stems are erect, round or square, and glabrous or sparsely and minutely hairy.
