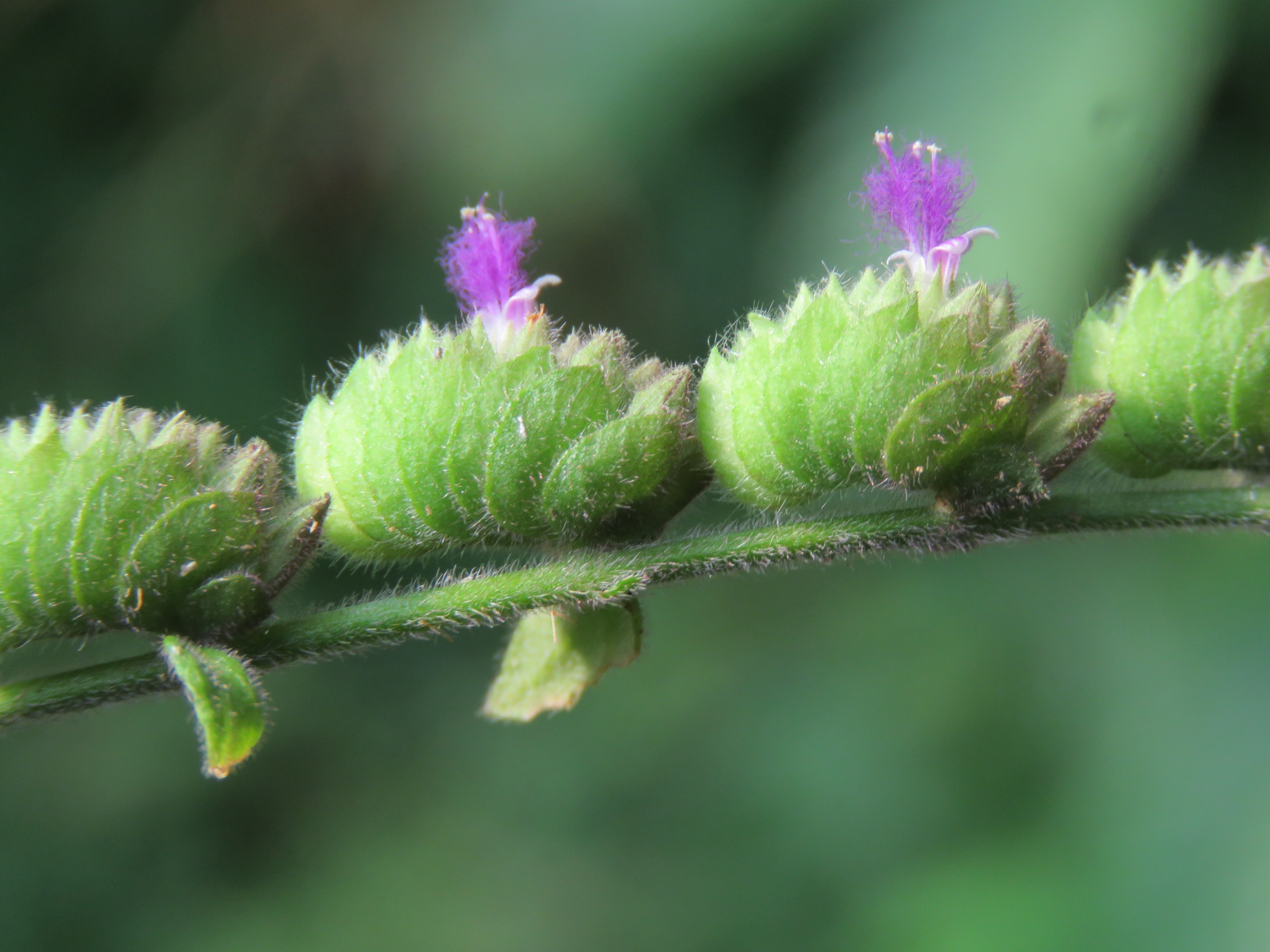

Scientific classification
- Kingdom: Plantae
- Clade: Tracheophytes
- Clade: Angiosperms
- Clade: Eudicots
- Clade: Asterids
- Order: Lamiales
- Family: Lamiaceae
- Genus: Pogostemon
- Species: P. purpurascens

Binomial name
- Pogostemon purpurascens Dalzell, 1850

= Pogostemon purpurascens =

Species of flowering plant

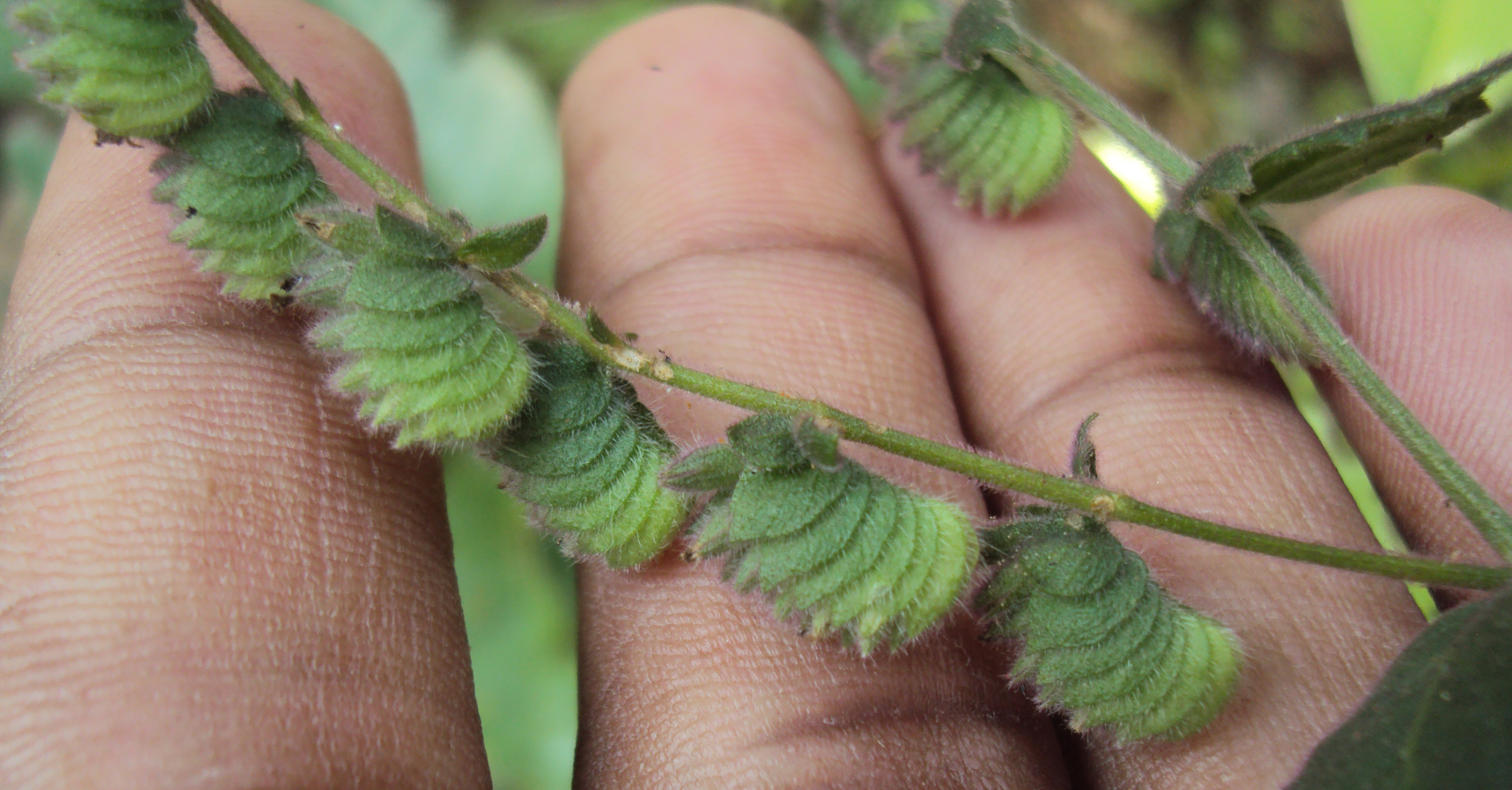

Pogostemon purpurascens is a small herbaceous, flowering plant found in the Western Ghats in South India. It is in the mint family, Lamiaceae.

== Description ==
Pogostemon purpurascens is an erect branched herb with a 20 cm tall, hairy stem. The leaves are elliptic, opposite with serrated margins. It bears tiny whitish flowers which blooms during the months of January and February.

== Uses ==
It is used as an anti-haemorrhagic (sometimes as a styptic) and antidote to stimulate scorpion stings and snake bites. It is also used to clean wounds.

In Manipur, leaves and flowers are used in the preparation of a local hair-care lotion.
