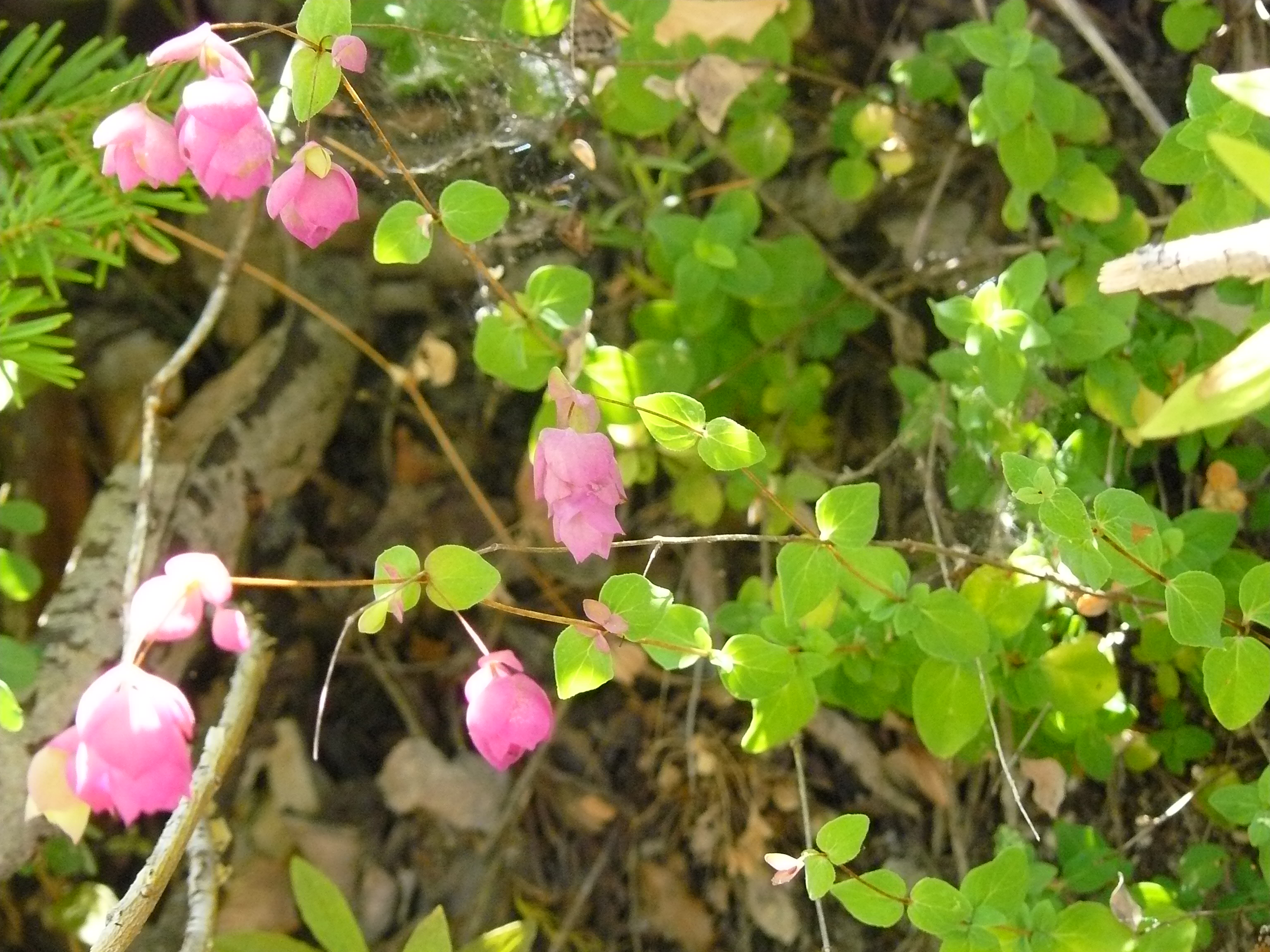
- Origanum libanoticum in the wild

Scientific classification
- Kingdom: Plantae
- Clade: Embryophytes
- Clade: Tracheophytes
- Clade: Angiosperms
- Clade: Eudicots
- Clade: Asterids
- Order: Lamiales
- Family: Lamiaceae
- Genus: Origanum
- Species: O. libanoticum

Binomial name
- Origanum libanoticum Boiss.

Synonyms
- Amaracus libanoticus (Boiss.) Briq.

= Origanum libanoticum =

Species of flowering plant

Origanum libanoticum (Lebanese oregano, hopflower oregano, cascading hopflower oregano, ornamental oregano or cascading oregano) is a species of herbaceous flowering plant in the family Lamiaceae, native to the mountains of Lebanon and Syria.

Origanum libanoticum is prized for its attractive foliage but especially for its pink bracts and flowers; it blooms from summer to fall.

== Description ==
Origanium libanoticum is a small perennial, growing to 20–30 cm (8–12 in) tall by 30–45 cm (12–18 in) wide. It with fragrant leaves, and pink, hop-like flowering bracts blooming between July and September. Overlapping pink to pale green hop-like bracts droop from the ends of wiry stems, hence the common name of hopflower oregano. Small rose-pink flowers stem from under the bracts. By the end of the flowering season, the flowers dry out and become papery and brown. The 1–1.5 cm (0.39–0.59 in) leaves are ovate and obtuse; they are fragrant but not as aromatic as other oregano species.

== Cultivation and uses ==
Origanum libanoticum is planted as an ornamental herb for its attractive flowers and foliage and not for culinary purposes. The bracts are valued for their use in dried floral arrangements. Origanum libanoticum is hardy and has good heat and drought tolerance. It can be easily grown in well-drained soil in full sun. A regular watering schedule during the first growing season is necessary to establish the plants extensive root system. The plant tolerates gritty, sandy loams but soil drainage is highly favorable for adequate growth. Winter survival may be enhanced by siting this plant in a protected location with a winter mulch. The spent dried flowers should be snipped off at winter's end to boost cold hardiness. O. libanoticum may be susceptible to root rot in badly drained soils and to spider mites and aphids. In 2004 it won the "Plant Select" award which is a collaboration of Colorado State University, the Denver Botanic Gardens, and the green industry and that recognizes durable, resilient, unique and vibrant plants.

== Gallery ==
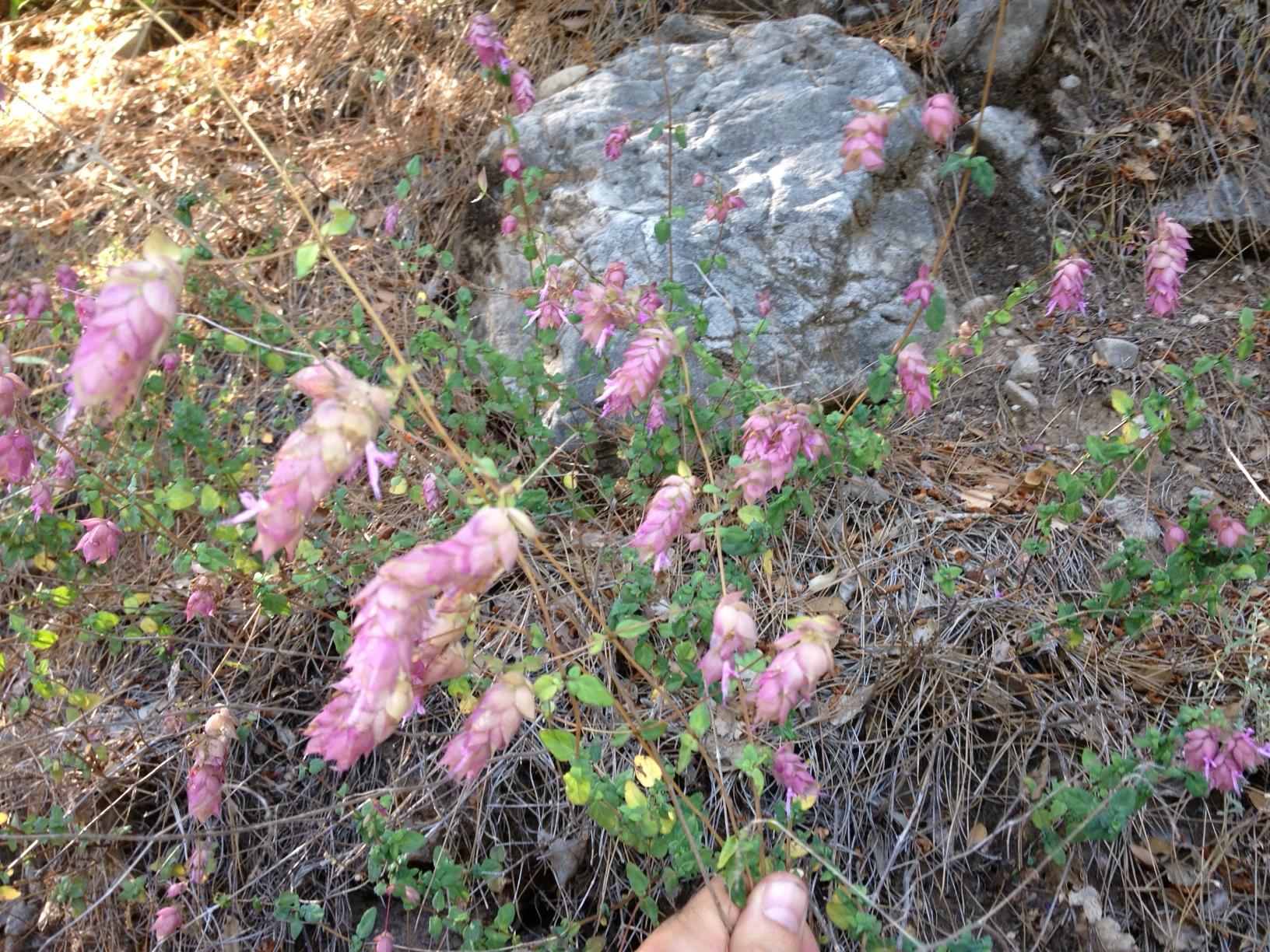
Lebanese oregano growing in its natural habitat

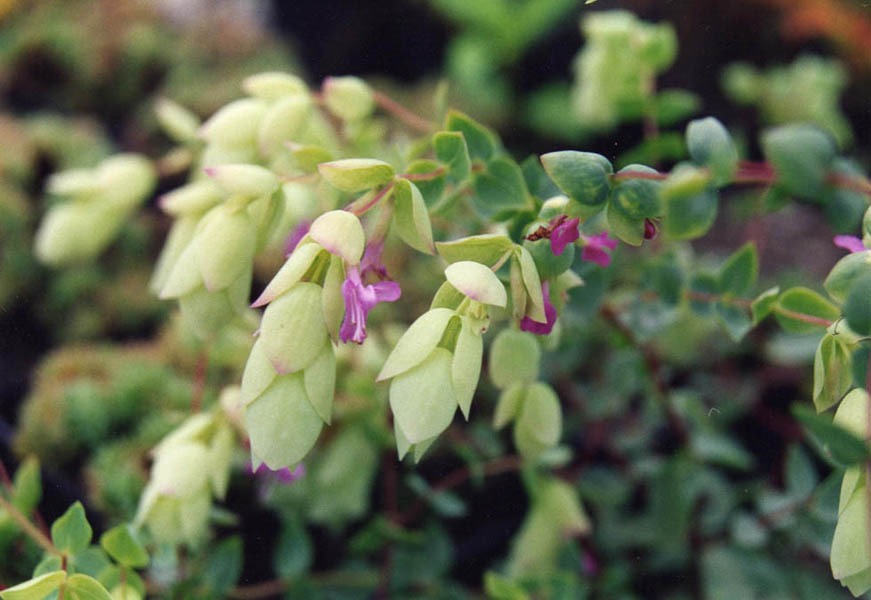
Origanum libanoticum
