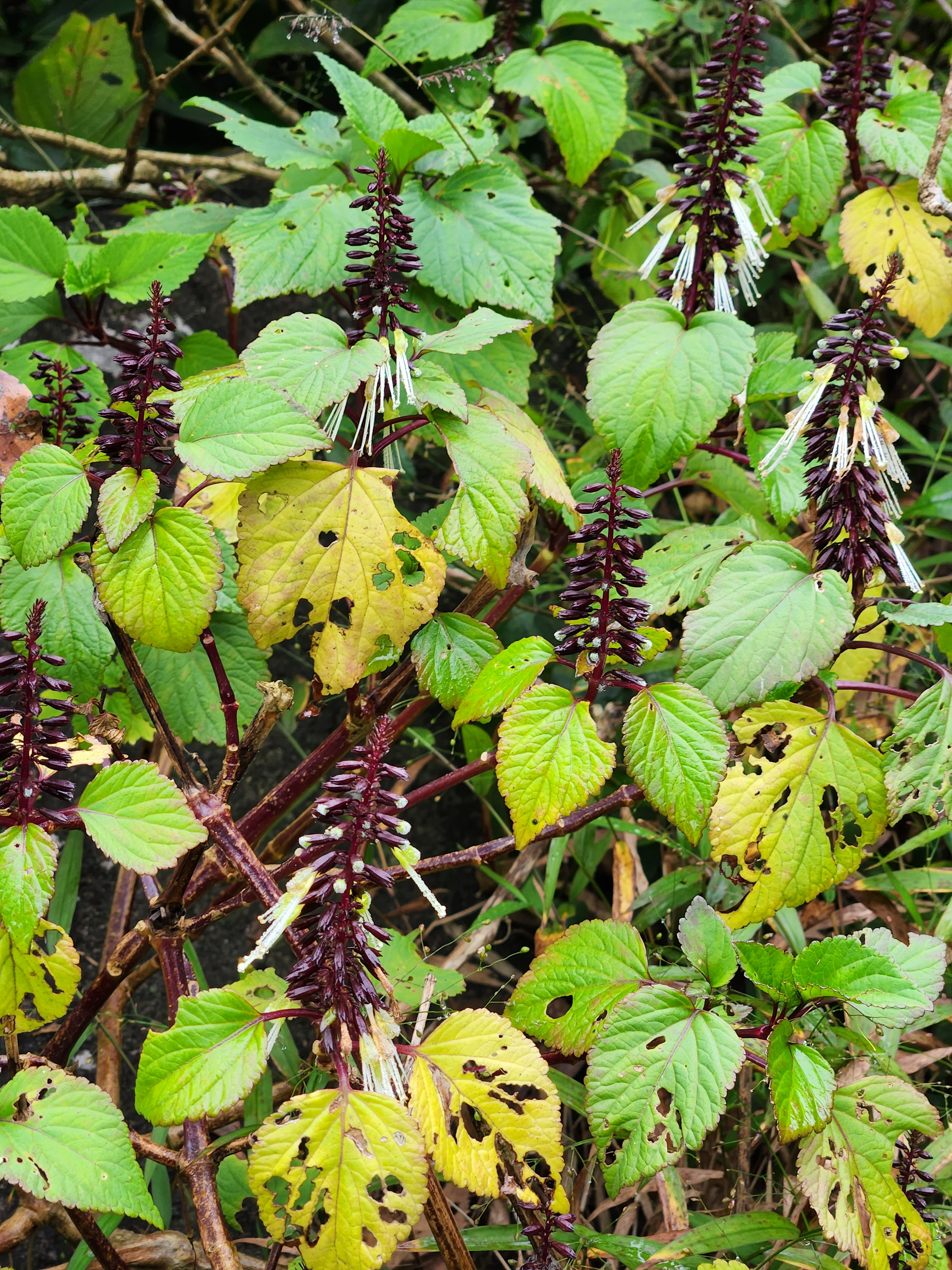

Scientific classification
- Kingdom: Plantae
- Clade: Tracheophytes
- Clade: Angiosperms
- Clade: Eudicots
- Clade: Asterids
- Order: Lamiales
- Family: Lamiaceae
- Genus: Pogostemon
- Species: P. travancoricus

Binomial name
- Pogostemon travancoricus Bedd.

= Pogostemon travancoricus =

Species of plant

Pogostemon travancoricus is a species of flowering plant growing in southern Western Ghats.

== Description ==
It is a shrub growing up to 2 ft in height. Stem is woody below. Branches are quadrangular and hairy. Leaves are ovate with acute apex and rounded base, crenate- serrate and minutely pubescent above and scabrous below. Flowers are funnel shaped, tube protruding from the sepal tube. Petals are velvet-hairy. Stamens are 1.2 cm long, hairless and prominently protrude out. Calyx is 7 mm long and 12 ribbed. Yellow corolla is 10 mm long with obtuse lobes.

== Range ==
Southern Western Ghats.

== Habitat ==
Open areas in evergreen forests.
