= Pogostemon stellatus =

- In aquarium

Conservation status
- Least Concern (IUCN 3.1)

Scientific classification
- Kingdom: Plantae
- Clade: Tracheophytes
- Clade: Angiosperms
- Clade: Eudicots
- Clade: Asterids
- Order: Lamiales
- Family: Lamiaceae
- Genus: Pogostemon
- Species: P. stellatus

Binomial name
- Pogostemon stellatus (Lour.) Kuntze

Synonyms
- List: Anuragia stellata (Lour.) Raizada; Dysophylla stellata (Lour.) Benth. ex Wall.; Eusteralis stellata (Lour.) Panigrahi; Mentha quaternifolia B.Heyne ex Roth; Mentha stellata Lour.; Anuragia tomentosa (Dalzell) Raizada; Anuragia verticillata (Benth. ex Wall.) Raizada; Dysophylla benthamiana Hance; Dysophylla esquirolii H.Lév.; Dysophylla japonica Miq.; Dysophylla nana Doan; Dysophylla ramosissima Benth.; Dysophylla tomentosa Dalzell; Dysophylla verticillata Benth. ex Wall.; Eusteralis pumila Raf.; Eusteralis tomentosa (Dalzell) Panigrahi; Pogostemon benthamianus (Hance) Kuntze; Pogostemon ciliatus Bhatti & Ingr.; Pogostemon japonicus (Miq.) Kuntze; Pogostemon verticillatus (Benth. ex Wall.) Miq.

Species of aquatic plant

Pogostemon stellatus is an aquatic, perennial, herbaceous flowering plant (angiosperm) from East and Southeast Asia, the Indian subcontinent, New Guinea, and northern Australia. Because of its extensive geographic distribution, there are many different colors and leaf forms of this plant to be found in the wild.

It is a fairly common, but highly prized and sought-after, decorative and functional species within the aquarium trade and aquascaping hobby. Some of the modern hybrids and cultivars include varieties such as 'Dassen', 'Kimberley', 'Narrowleaf', and 'Octopus'.

== See also ==
- List of freshwater aquarium plant species
