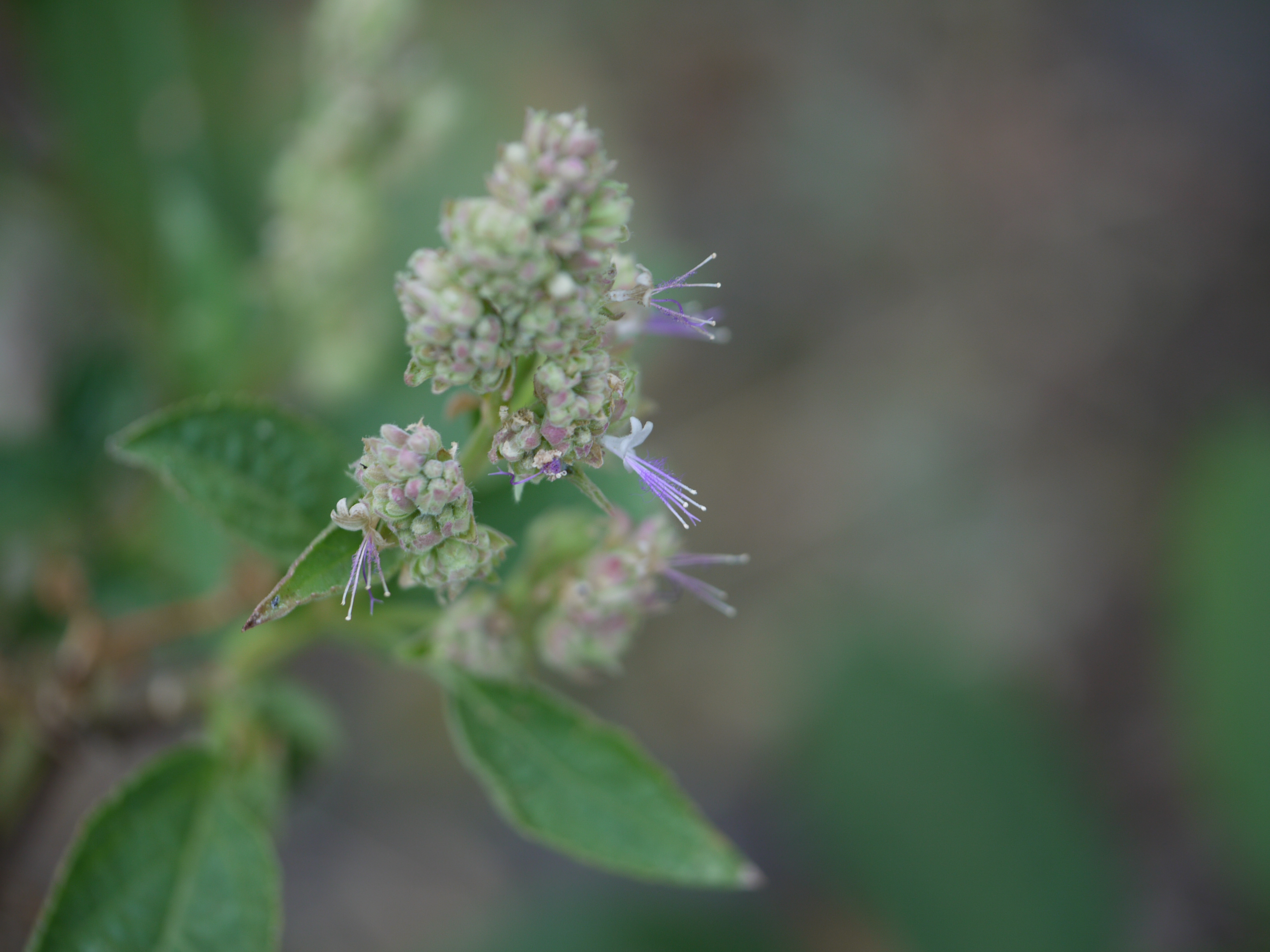

Scientific classification
- Kingdom: Plantae
- Clade: Embryophytes
- Clade: Tracheophytes
- Clade: Spermatophytes
- Clade: Angiosperms
- Clade: Eudicots
- Clade: Asterids
- Order: Lamiales
- Family: Lamiaceae
- Genus: Pogostemon
- Species: P. benghalensis

Binomial name
- Pogostemon benghalensis (Burm.f.) Kuntze

Synonyms
- Origanum benghalense Burm.f.

= Pogostemon benghalensis =

Species of plant

Pogostemon benghalensis, commonly known as the Bengal Pogostemon or Bengal patchouli, is a species of flowering plant belonging to the family Lamiaceae.

== Description ==
It is a herb with a strong, solid, and angular stem. The leaves are opposite, with petioles up to 2.5 cm long; the lamina is ovate, about 13 × 6 cm in size, with a cuneate base, double-dentate margin, and acuminate apex. The inflorescence is a verticillaster arranged in a terminal false spike, about 7 cm long, often branched at the base into two or more lateral spikes. The calyx is inflated, tubular, about 4 mm long, hairy on the outside and glabrous within, with five ciliate teeth approximately 1 mm long. The corolla is tubular, up to 8.7 mm long, two-lipped, with the upper lip three-lobed. There are four stamens inserted at different heights in the corolla tube, with filaments 5–7 mm long.

The fruit consists of four nutlets that are obovoid, about 1.2 mm long, and finely punctate. The species closely resembles Pogostemon plectranthoides Desf., but can be distinguished by its narrower corolla tube and less crowded inflorescence.

== Distribution ==
It is indigenous to the Himalayan region and can be found at altitudes ranging from 150 to 1300 m

== Uses ==
Different parts of the plant are used in various traditional preparations—such as decoctions, fresh extracts, poultices, and infusions—to treat a range of ailments, including depression, infections, sexual weakness, intermittent fever, and intestinal disorders,.

In its native regions (Bangladesh, Nepal and Northeast India), the leaves of the plant are also cooked and eaten in fish curries, stir-fries, and pakoras for their distinct flavour and aroma.
