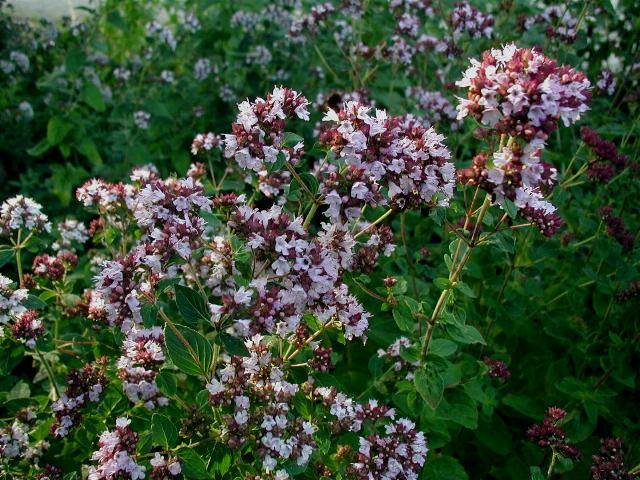
- Origanum vulgare

Scientific classification
- Kingdom: Plantae
- Clade: Tracheophytes
- Clade: Angiosperms
- Clade: Eudicots
- Clade: Asterids
- Order: Lamiales
- Family: Lamiaceae
- Tribe: Mentheae
- Genus: Origanum; L.

Synonyms
- Amaracus Gled.; Majorana Mill.; × Origanomajorana Domin; Dictamnus Mill. 1754 not L. 1753 nor Zinn 1757; Dictamnus Zinn 1757 not L. 1753 nor Mill. 1754; Marum Mill.; Hofmannia Heist. ex Fabr.; Beltokon Raf.; Onites Raf.; Oroga Raf.; Zatarendia Raf.; Schizocalyx Scheele rejected name; × Majoranamaracus Rech.f.

= Origanum =

Genus of flowering plants

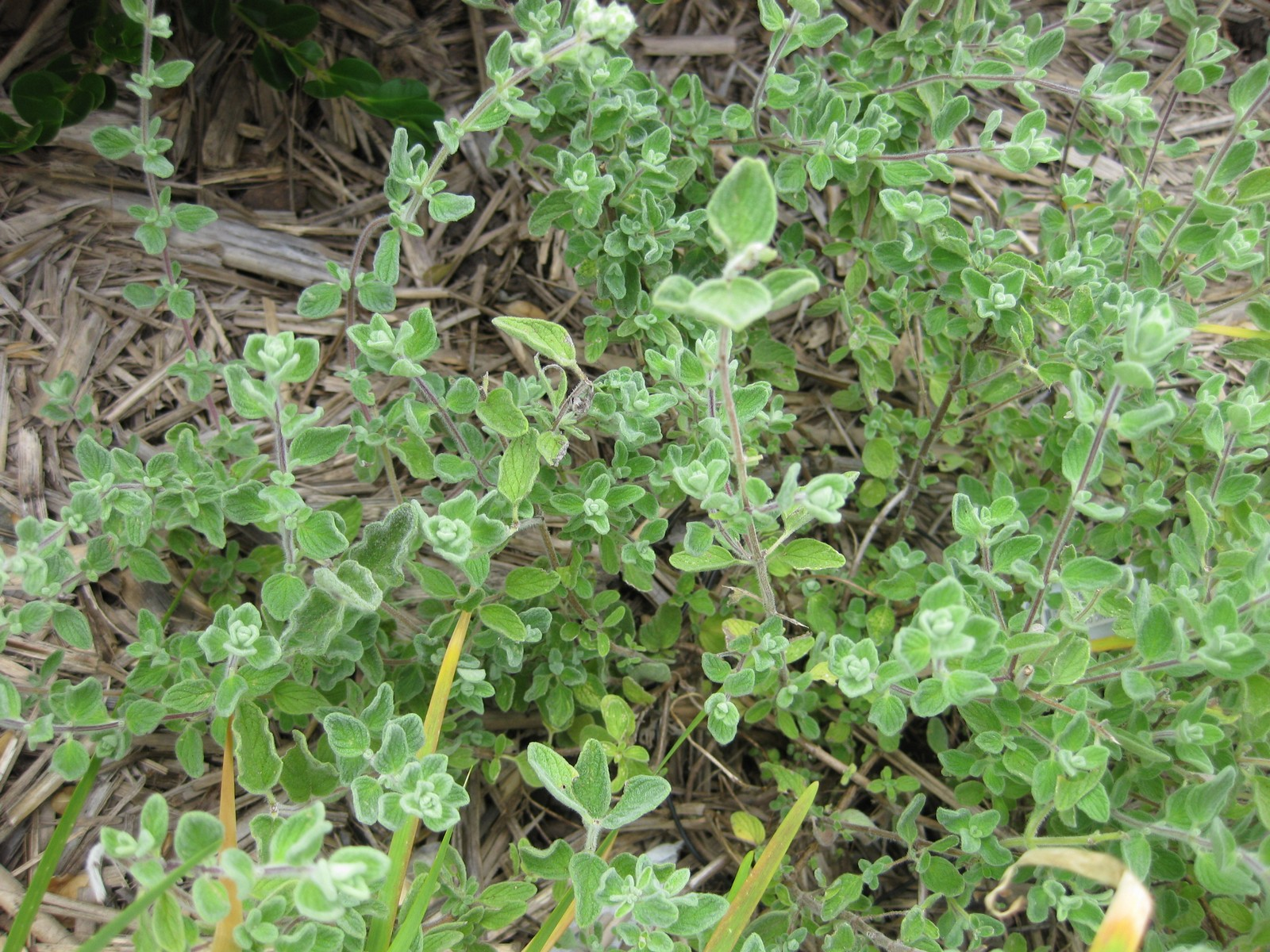
Origanum syriacum

Origanum (/oʊˈrɪɡənəm/ oh-RIG-ə-nəm) is a genus of herbaceous perennial flowering plants and subshrubs in the family Lamiaceae. They are native to Europe, North Africa, and much of temperate Asia, where they are found in open or mountainous habitats. A few species also naturalized in scattered locations in North America and other regions.

The plants have strongly aromatic leaves and abundant tubular flowers with long-lasting coloured bracts. The genus includes an important group of culinary herbs including marjoram (Origanum majorana), oregano (Origanum vulgare), and za'atar (Origanum syriacum).

With their decorative bracts, Origanum species and cultivars are used as ornamental plants in the garden. The cultivars 'Kent Beauty' and 'Rosenkuppel' have received the Royal Horticultural Society's Award of Garden Merit.

Origanum species are used as food plants by the larvae of some Lepidoptera species, including Coleophora albitarsella.

== Species ==
There are about 67 species native to Eurasia and Northern Africa.

1. Origanum acutidens (Hand.-Mazz.) Ietsw. – Türkiye, Iraq
2. Origanum × adanense Baser & H.Duman – Türkiye (O. bargyli × O. laevigatum)
3. Origanum × adonidis Mouterde – Lebanon (O. libanoticum × O. syriacum subsp. bevanii)
4. Origanum akhdarense Ietsw. & Boulos – Cyrenaica region of eastern Libya
5. Origanum amanum Post – Hatay region of Türkiye
6. Origanum × barbarae Bornm. – Lebanon (O. ehrenbergii × O. syriacum subsp. bevanii)
7. Origanum bargyli Mouterde – Türkiye, Syria
8. Origanum bilgeri P.H.Davis – Antalya region of Türkiye
9. Origanum boissieri Ietsw. – Türkiye
10. Origanum calcaratum Juss. – Greece
11. Origanum compactum Benth. – Spain, Morocco
12. Origanum cordifolium (Montbret & Aucher ex Benth.) Vogel – Cyprus
13. Origanum cyrenaicum Bég. & Vacc. – Cyrenaica region of eastern Libya
14. Origanum dayi Post – West Bank, Palestine
15. Origanum dictamnus L. (hop marjoram, Cretan dittany, dittany of Crete) – endemic to Crete
16. Origanum × dolichosiphon P.H.Davis – Seyhan region of Türkiye (O. amanum × O. laevigatum)
17. Origanum ehrenbergii Boiss. – Lebanon
18. Origanum elongatum (Bonnet) Emb. & Maire – Morocco
19. Origanum floribundum Munby – Algeria
20. Origanum × haradjanii Rech.f – Türkiye (O. laevigatum × O. syriacum subsp. bevanii)
21. Origanum haussknechtii Boiss. – Türkiye
22. Origanum husnucan-baseri H.Duman, Aytac & A.Duran – Türkiye
23. Origanum hypericifolium O.Schwarz & P.H.Davis – Türkiye
24. Origanum × intercedens Rech.f. – Greece, Türkiye (O. onites × O. vulgare subsp. hirtum)
25. Origanum × intermedium P.H.Davis – Denizli region of Türkiye (O. onites × O. sipyleum)
26. Origanum isthmicum Danin – Sinai
27. Origanum jordanicum Danin & Kunne – Jordan
28. Origanum laevigatum Boiss. – Türkiye, Syria, Cyprus
29. Origanum leptocladum Boiss. – Türkiye
30. Origanum libanoticum Boiss. – Lebanon
31. Origanum majorana L. (marjoram or sweet marjoram) – Türkiye, Cyprus; naturalized in scattered locations in Europe, North Africa, North + South America
32. Origanum × lirium Heldr. ex Halácsy – Greece (O. scabrum × O. vulgare subsp. hirtum)
33. Origanum × majoricum Cambess. (hardy sweet marjoram) – Spain including Balearic Islands (O. majorana × O. vulgare subsp. virens)
34. Origanum microphyllum (Benth.) Vogel – Crete
35. Origanum × minoanum P.H.Davis – Crete (O. microphyllum × O. vulgare subsp. hirtum)
36. Origanum minutiflorum O.Schwarz & P.H.Davis – Türkiye
37. Origanum munzurense Kit Tan & Sorger – Türkiye
38. Origanum × nebrodense Tineo ex Lojac – Sicily (O. majorana × O. vulgare subsp. viridulum)
39. Origanum onites L. (Cretan oregano) – East Aegean Is., Greece, Crete, Sicilia, Türkiye; naturalized in Cyprus, Tunisia
40. Origanum × pabotii Mouterde – Syria (O. bargyli × O. syriacum subsp. bevanii)
41. Origanum pampaninii (Brullo & Furnari) Ietsw – Cyrenaica region of eastern Libya
42. Origanum petraeum Danin – Jordan
43. Origanum punonense Danin – Jordan
44. Origanum ramonense Danin – Levant
45. Origanum rotundifolium Boiss. – Türkiye, Caucasus
46. Origanum saccatum P.H.Davis – Türkiye
47. Origanum scabrum Boiss. & Heldr. in P.E.Boissier – Greece
48. Origanum sipyleum L. – Türkiye, Greek Islands
49. Origanum solymicum P.H.Davis – Antalya region of Türkiye
50. Origanum symes Carlström – Islands of the Aegean Sea
51. Origanum syriacum L. (bible-hyssop, za'atar) – Cyprus, Lebanon-Syria, Palestine, Saudi Arabia, Sinai, Türkiye
52. Origanum vetteri Briq. & Barbey – Crete
53. Origanum vogelii Greuter & Burdet – Türkiye
54. Origanum vulgare L. – oregano – Europe, North Africa, temperate Asia (Iran, Siberia, Central Asia, China, etc.); naturalized in parts of North America, New Zealand, Venezuela

=== Formerly placed here ===
- Pogostemon benghalensis (Burm.f.) Kuntze (as O. benghalense Burm.f.)
