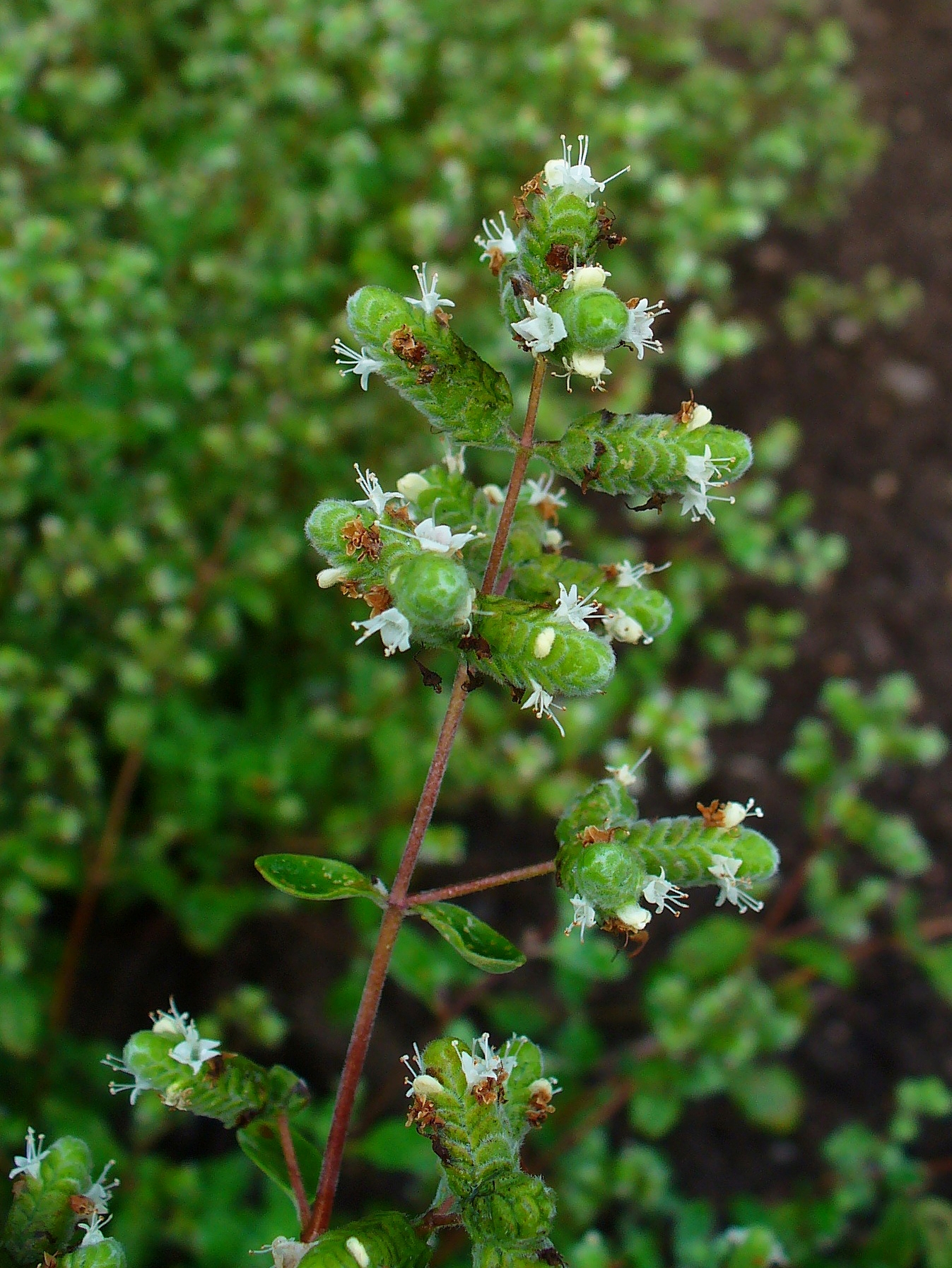

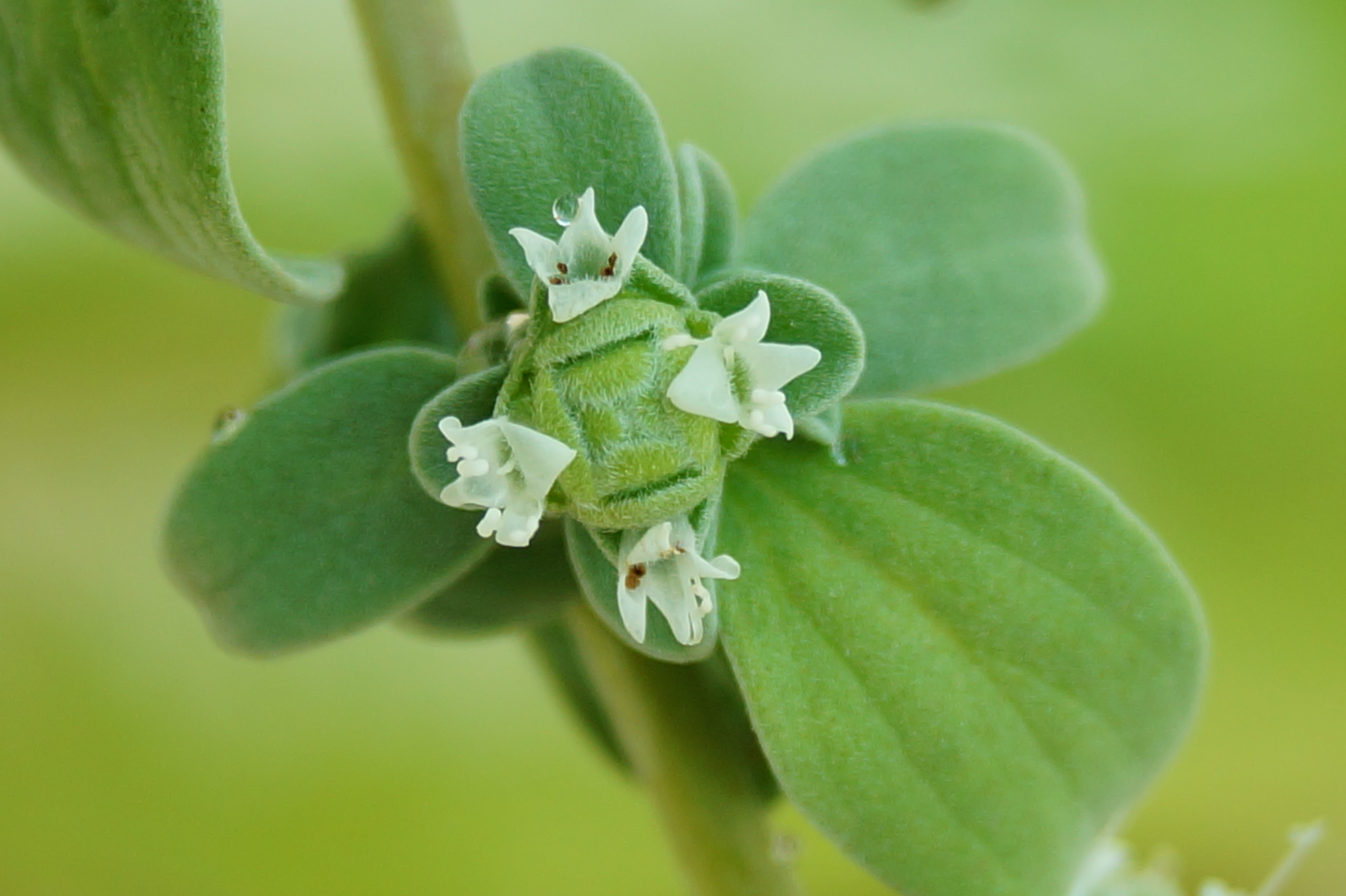
- Flowers

Scientific classification
- Kingdom: Plantae
- Clade: Tracheophytes
- Clade: Angiosperms
- Clade: Eudicots
- Clade: Asterids
- Order: Lamiales
- Family: Lamiaceae
- Genus: Origanum
- Species: O. majorana

Binomial name
- Origanum majorana L.

Synonyms
- Majorana hortensis Moench

= Marjoram =

Perennial herb

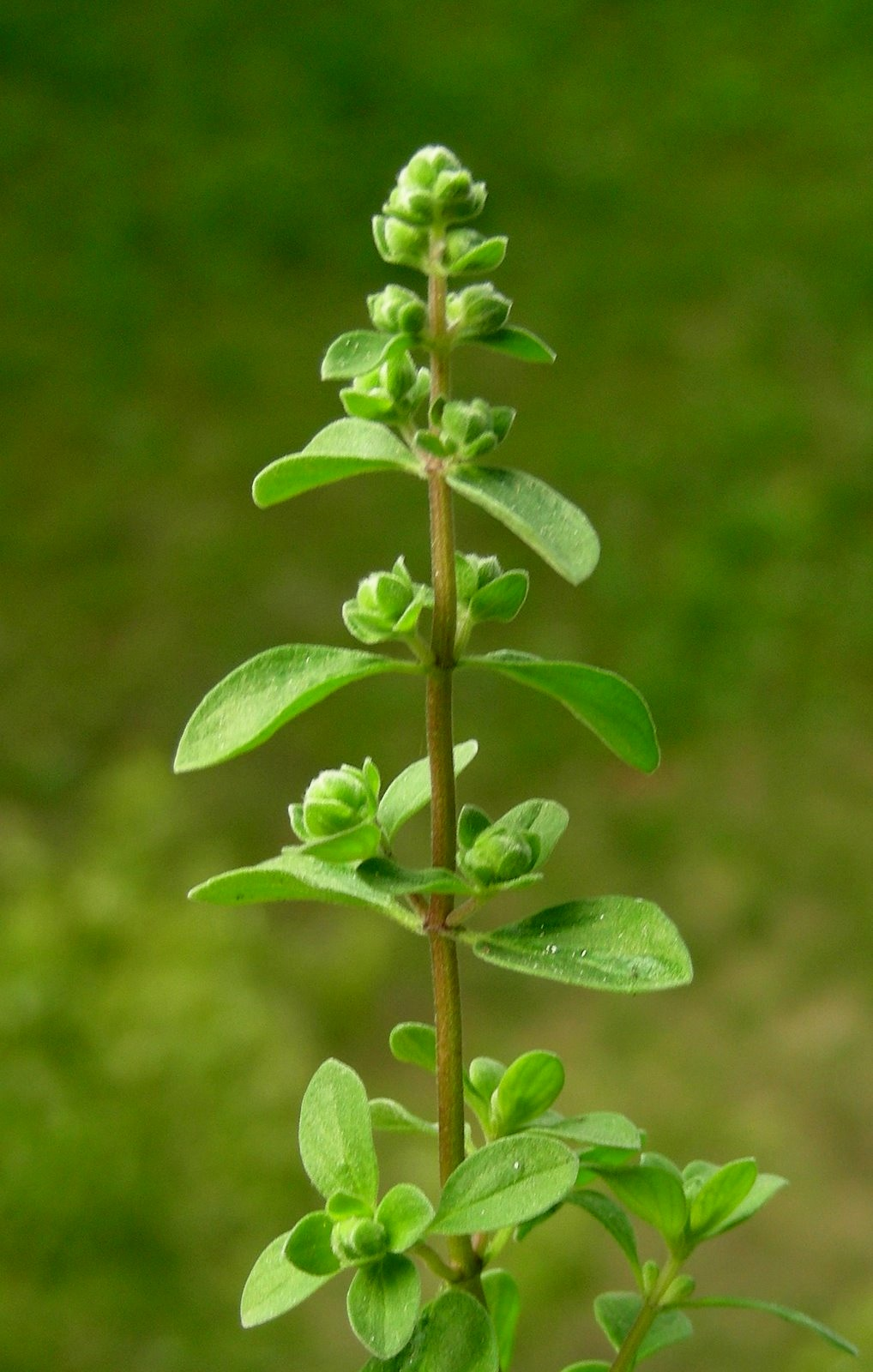
Growing tip with flower buds

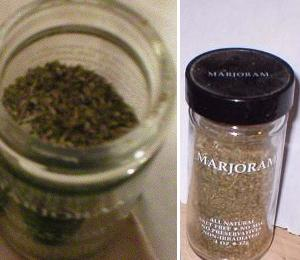
Dried marjoram herb for flavoring

Marjoram (/ˈmɑːrdʒərəm/, Origanum majorana, syn. Majorana hortensis Moench) is a cold-sensitive perennial herb or undershrub with sweet pine and citrus flavours. In some Middle Eastern countries, marjoram is synonymous with oregano, and there the names sweet marjoram and knotted marjoram are used to distinguish it from other plants of the genus Origanum. It is also called pot marjoram, although this name is also used for other cultivated species of Origanum.

== History ==
Marjoram is indigenous to Cyprus, Turkey, the Levant and the Arabian Peninsula, and was known to the ancient Greeks and Romans as a symbol of happiness. It may have spread to the British Isles during the Middle Ages. Marjoram was not widely used in the United States until after World War II.

The name marjoram (Old French: majorane; Medieval Latin: majorana) does not directly derive from the Latin word maior (major).

It has been used in Sephardi Jewish tradition as a ritual medical practice. Ancient Greeks thought the plant was created by Aphrodite. In one narrative, the royal perfumer of Cyprus, Amaracus, was transformed into marjoram. To the Romans the herb was known as the herb of happiness, and was thought to increase lifespan. Marjoram is mentioned in De Materia Medica by Pedanius Dioscorides, and was used by Hippocrates as an antiseptic.

== Description ==
Leaves are smooth, simple, petiolated, ovate to oblong-ovate, 0.5–1.5 cm (0.2–0.6 inches) long, 0.2–0.8 cm (0.1–0.3 inches) wide, with obtuse apex, entire margin, symmetrical but tapering base, and reticulate venation. The texture of the leaf is extremely smooth due to the presence of numerous hairs. Its flowers can be white, pink to red, or blue to purple.

== Cultivation ==
Considered a tender perennial (USDA Zones 7–9), marjoram can sometimes prove hardy even in zone 5. Under proper conditions it spreads prolifically, and so is usually grown in pots to prevent it from taking over a garden.

Marjoram is cultivated for its aromatic leaves, either green or dry, for culinary purposes; the tops are cut as the plants begin to flower and are dried slowly in the shade. It is often used in herb combinations such as herbes de Provence and za'atar. The flowering leaves and tops of marjoram are steam-distilled to produce an essential oil that is yellowish (darkening to brown as it ages). It has many chemical components, some of which are borneol, camphor, and pinene.

== Related species ==
Oregano (Origanum vulgare), sometimes listed with marjoram as O. majorana, is also called wild marjoram. It is a perennial common in southern Europe and north to Sweden in dry copses and on hedge-banks, with many stout stems 30–80 centimetres (12–31 in) high, bearing short-stalked, somewhat ovate leaves and clusters of purple flowers. It has a stronger flavor than marjoram.

Pot marjoram or Cretan oregano (O. onites) has similar uses to marjoram.

Hardy marjoram or French/Italian/Sicilian marjoram (O. × majoricum), a cross of marjoram with oregano, is much more resistant to cold, but is slightly less sweet.

O. × hybridum is known as showy marjoram or showy oregano.

== Uses ==
Marjoram is used for seasoning lamb and vegetable dishes, soups, stews, salad dressings, sauces, herbal teas, and sausages. Its flavor resembles that of oregano.

Marjoram has long been used as a medicinal herb. Marjoram or marjoram oil has been used to treat cancer, colds, coughs, cramps, depression, ear infections, gastrointestinal problems, headaches, and paralysis, as well as arthritis, chest congestion, muscle aches, and as a diuretic. It has also been used as an aphrodisiac, mouthwash, tea, and in poultices, tinctures, and infusions. Though not all of its historic uses are scientifically backed, the plant has verifiable medical use. For example, it contains the phenol carvacrol, which is antibacterial, antifungal and antimicrobial. Ethanol extract is cytotoxic against fibrosarcoma cell lines, ethyl acetate extract has antiproliferative properties against PER.C6 and HeLa cells, as have hesperetin and hydroquinone, which can be isolated from marjoram extract. Cardioprotective, hepatoprotective, antiulcerogenetic, anticholinesterase, anti-polyendocrine metabolic ovarian syndrome (PMOS), and anti-inflammatory effects were also found in dried marjoram, marjoram tea, or in compounds extracted from marjoram. Marjoram is generally not toxic, but should not be used by pregnant or lactating women. However, it is always important to be cautious and consult a doctor when using medical herbs.

== Symbolism ==
It is used by the clown Lavatch in All's Well That Ends Well (IV.5) to describe Helena and his regret at her apparent death:

"she was the sweet marjoram of the salad, or rather, the herb of grace."

== See also ==
- Origanum onites
- Origanum vulgare
