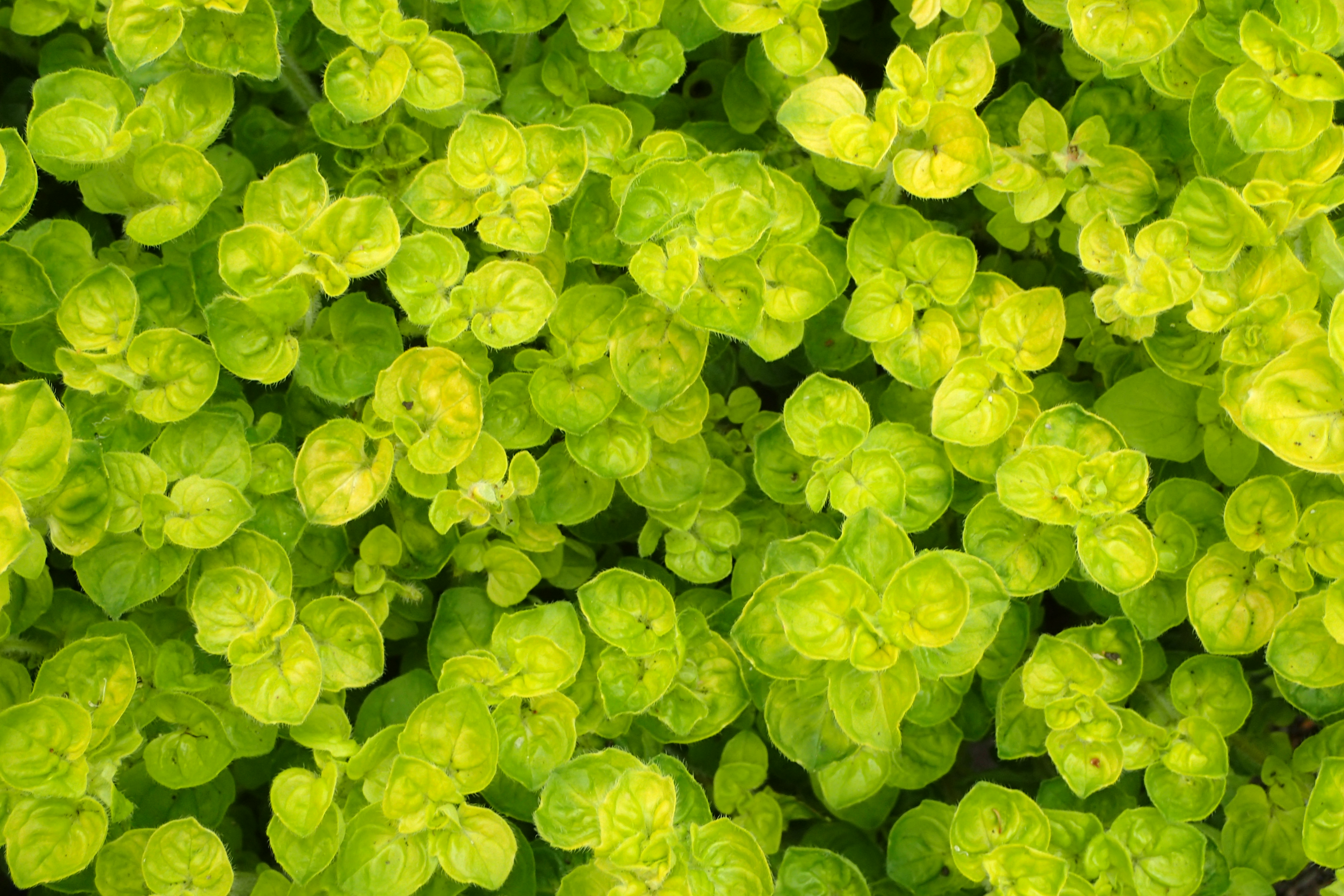
- Origanum onites 'Aurea' in Wellington Botanical Garden

Scientific classification
- Kingdom: Plantae
- Clade: Tracheophytes
- Clade: Angiosperms
- Clade: Eudicots
- Clade: Asterids
- Order: Lamiales
- Family: Lamiaceae
- Genus: Origanum
- Species: O. onites

Binomial name
- Origanum onites L.

Synonyms
- Majorana cretica Mill.; Majorana onites (L.) Benth.; Majorana orega (Vogel) Briq.; Majorana oreja Walp. [Spelling variant]; Majorana smyrnaea (L.) T.Nees; Onites tomentosus Raf.; Origanum album Salisb. nom. illeg.; Origanum heracleoticum W.D.J.Koch nom. illeg.; Origanum orega Vogel; Origanum pallidum Desf.; Origanum smyrnaeum L.; Origanum tragoriganum Zucc. ex Steud. nom. inval.; Schizocalyx smyrnaeus (L.) Scheele

= Origanum onites =

Species of plant

Origanum onites, the Cretan oregano, Greek oregano, pot marjoram or Ellinikí rίgani in Greek (Ελληνική ρίγανη), is a plant species in the genus Origanum found in Sicily, Greece and Turkey. It has similar flavors as common oregano. It has antimicrobial activities.

== Chemistry ==
The plant contains the chemical compounds thymol, carvacrol and cedrol.
