= Tetramethyl acetyloctahydronaphthalenes =

(2R,3R)- [54464-57-2]
(2S,3S)- [144651-56-9]

Names
- IUPAC name 1-(1,2,3,4,5,6,7,8-octahydro-2,3,8,8,-tetramethyl-2-naphthyl)ethan-1-one
- Other names Amberonne; Ambralux; Boisvelone; Derambrene; Timbersilk; Methyl cyclomyrectone; 1,2,3,4,5,6,7,8-octahydro-2,3,8,8-tetramethyl-2-acetonaphthalenone; OTNE

Identifiers
CAS Number	54464-57-2; 68155-66-8; 68155-67-9
3D model (JSmol)	Interactive image
ChemSpider	1413691
ECHA InfoCard	100.144.093
EC Number	915-730-3
PubChem CID	1808126
UNII	1GD7ODM28Y
- InChI: InChI=1S/C16H26O/c1-11-9-13-7-6-8-15(3,4)14(13)10-16(11,5)12(2)17/h11H,6-10H2,1-5H3/t11-,16-/m1/s1 Key: FVUGZKDGWGKCFE-BDJLRTHQSA-N
- SMILES: CC(=O)[C@]1(C)CC2=C(C[C@H]1C)CCCC2(C)C

Properties
Chemical formula	C_{16}H_{26}O
Molar mass	234.38 g/mol
Appearance	colorless to a pale yellow liquid
Odor	amber, woody
Density	0.964 (at 20 °C)
Melting point	< −20 °C
Boiling point	290 °C (554 °F; 563 K)
log P	5.65
Refractive index (n_{D})	1.4975–1.500 (at 20 °C)

Hazards
- GHS labelling
Pictograms	(GHS07: Exclamation mark) (GHS09: Environmental hazard)
Signal word	Warning
Hazard statements	H315, H317, H410, H411
Flash point	134 °C (closed cup)
- Except where otherwise noted, data are given for materials in their standard state (at 25 °C [77 °F], 100 kPa). Infobox references

Tetramethyl acetyloctahydronaphthalenes (International Nomenclature for Cosmetic Ingredients (INCI) name) (1-(1,2,3,4,5,6,7,8-octahydro-2,3,8,8,-tetramethyl-2-naphthyl)ethan-1-one) is a synthetic ketone fragrance also known as OTNE (octahydrotetramethyl acetophenone) and by other commercial trade names such as: Iso E Super, Iso Gamma Super, Anthamber, Amber Fleur, Boisvelone, Iso Ambois, Amberlan, Iso Velvetone, Orbitone, Amberonne. It is a synthetic woody odorant and is used as a fragrance ingredient in perfumes, laundry products and cosmetics. It has been described as "the most successful synthetic fragrance ever".

== History ==
In about 1956, Gunther Ohloff at Dragoco began studying woody-smelling compounds and Dragoco patented them. In 1959, Garry Kitchens at Givaudan patented another isomer of these compounds. In 1968, Ohloff again, now at Firmenich, published the formula for what would be Iso E but there was no patent. In 1973, John Hall and James Milton Sanders created the same compound at International Flavors & Fragrances (IFF); the patent (which also described an enriched single-isomer version) was granted in 1975. It was named Isocyclemone E (or, Iso E) and its first use was in a fragrance was Halston (1975). IFF later shifted commercial production toward the isolated isomer described in that same patent, marketing it as Iso E Super. In 1990, Givaudan chemists improved it further and that became Iso E Super Plus.

== Odour ==
According International Flavors & Fragrances Inc., OTNE has a "smooth, woody, amber[ous] [scent] with unique aspects giving a 'velvet' like sensation". Its odour is long-lasting on skin and fabric. Its fragrance has been described also as "revolutionary".

== Production ==
In commercial applications, Iso E Super is produced via a Diels–Alder reaction.

Synthesis

== Chemical summary ==
OTNE is the abbreviation for the fragrance material with Chemical Abstract Service (CAS) numbers 68155-66-8, 54464-57-2 and 68155-67-9 and EC List number 915-730-3. The commercial product comprises more than twenty isomeric ketones. The dominant isomer, often designated as the beta isomer, makes up most of the mixture yet is nearly odourless. The characteristic scent instead comes from a minor constituent, the gamma isomer, commonly known as Arborone, which typically represents only a few percent of the mixture. It is a multi-constituent isomer mixture containing:

- 1-(1,2,3,4,5,6,7,8-octahydro-2,3,8,8-tetramethyl-2-naphthyl)ethan-1-one (CAS 54464-57-2)
- 1-(1,2,3,5,6,7,8,8a-octahydro-2,3,8,8-tetramethyl-2-naphthyl)ethan-1-one (CAS 68155-66-8)
- 1-(1,2,3,4,6,7,8,8a-octahydro-2,3,8,8-tetramethyl-2-naphthyl)ethan-1-one (CAS 68155-67-9)

== Physical-chemical properties ==
OTNE is a clear yellow liquid at 20 °C. Its melting point is below −20 °C at atmospheric pressure, and its boiling point is determined to be at around 290 °C (modified OECD 103 method). All physicochemical data have been obtained from the OTNE REACH registration dossier.

== Safety ==
Iso E Super may cause allergic reactions detectable by patch tests in humans and chronic exposure to Iso E Super from perfumes may result in permanent hypersensitivity. In a study with female mice, Iso E Super was positive in the local lymph node assay (LLNA) and irritancy assay (IRR), but negative in the mouse ear swelling test (MEST).

No data were available regarding chemical disposition, metabolism, or toxicokinetics; acute, short-term, subchronic, or chronic toxicity; synergistic or antagonistic activity; reproductive or teratological effects; carcinogenicity; genotoxicity; or immunotoxicity. Given the sensitization classification of OTNE, and its use in fragrances, the International Fragrance Association (IFRA) has published safe use levels for OTNE in consumer products, which have been in effect since August 2009.

OTNE is classified as a skin irritant (R38 EU DSD, H315 EU CLP) and is positive in the Local Lymph Node Assay (LLNA – OECD 429) and therefore classified as a skin sensitiser (R43 EU DSD, H317 EU CLP), though OTNE lacks any structural alerts for sensitisation in in silico prediction models (DEREK) and is not identified as an allergen in in vivo Human Repeated Patch Tests. Several health related studies have been conducted on OTNE, and based on these studies, OTNE has been determined to be safe under the current conditions of use. It is not classified as toxic or as a CMR substance.

== Environmental data ==
OTNE is classified as H410 Very toxic to aquatic life with long-lasting effects (EU-CLP) or R51/53 Toxic to aquatic organisms, may cause long-term adverse effects in the aquatic environment (EU DSD). The biodegradation of OTNE in fresh water (T1/2) is at most 40 days, and at most 120 days in sediment (OECD 314 test), though the biodegradation within the 28day window was around 11% (OECD 301-C). Given the outcome of the OECD 314 test OTNE does not meet the criteria for “Persistent” (P) or “very Persistent” (vP). The measured Bio Concentration Factor (BCF) is 391 L/kg, which is well below the EU limit of 2000 and US limit of 1000 for Bioaccumulation (B) classification. The LogKow for OTNE has been measured to be 5.65. OTNE is therefore not classified as a PBT or vPvB substance for the EU or any other global criteria.

OTNE has been detected in surface water at levels of 29–180 ng/L, These values are well below the Predicted No Effect Concentration (PNEC) and as a result the overall environmental risk ratio (also referred to as RCR or PEC/PNECS) is determined to be below 1.

== Regulatory status ==
OTNE is registered on all major chemical inventories (US, Japan, China, Korea, Philippines, and Australia) and has been EU REACH registered in 2010. In 2014 the US National Toxicology Program (NTP) conducted a 13-week repeat dose toxicity study and found no adverse effects. OTNE has been recommended for inclusion in an update for the EU Fragrance Allergens labelling for cosmetic products based on a small number of positive reactions in dermatological clinics of around 0.2% to 1.7% of patients tested in three studies If the proposed SCCS Opinion is taken forward into legislation then OTNE will be labelled on cosmetic products in the EU, several years after publication of a new legislation.

== Commercial products ==
Iso E Super is found in many fragrances, and also in a variety of other commercial products.

Beginning in the late 1980s, Iso E Super became a staple in perfumery and was used in increasingly high amounts; for example:

- Halston (1975): The first use of Iso E Super in a fragrance
- Christian Dior Fahrenheit (1988): 25 percent
- Lancôme Tresor (1990), 18 percent, and it became part of Sophia Grojsman's famous accord of 20 percent each methyl ionone, Hedione, Iso E Super, and Galaxolide
- Shiseido-Serge Lutens Féminité du Bois (1992): 43 percent
- Hermès Terre d’Hermès (2006): 55 percent
- Lalique, Perles de Lalique (2006): 80 percent
- Escentric Molecules Molecule 01 (2006): Made entirely of diluted Iso E Super

Iso E Super is in a wide variety of commercial products with differing scents, listed under the name tetramethyl acetyloctahydronaphthalenes. Examples of commercial products with this ingredient include:

- Arm & Hammer Liquid Laundry Detergent Plus Softener 3-in-1 Orchard Bloom
- Aveeno Active Naturals Skin Relief Body Wash
- Bath & Body Works Clean House Vibes Single Wick Candle
- Fabuloso 2X Multi-Purpose Cleaner, Refreshing Lemon Scent
- Gain Liquid Fabric Softener, Original Scent
- Little Trees Black Ice
- Mrs. Meyer's Iowa Pine Liquid Hand Soap
