= Halston (fragrance) =

1975 fragrance

Fragrance by Halston (fashion house)
- Category: Amber Woody Chypre
- Designed for: Women
- Top notes: Primarily green notes and marigold
- Heart notes: Primarily cedarwood
- Base notes: Primarily patchouli
- Released: 1975
- Perfumer(s): Bernard Chant and Max Gavarry
- Tagline: "Wear a Halston original"
- Flanker(s): Halston Sheer (1998); Halston Woman (2009); Halston Woman Amber (2010)
- Awards: FiFi Awards, 1976 Women's Fragrance of the Year - Prestige

Halston is an amber woody chypre fragrance that was released in 1975 by Halston, two years after he sold his name and company to Norton Simon, Inc. Within two years, it had made $85 million in sales (equivalent to $468 million in 2026), making it one of the top-selling fragrances in history.

== Fragrance ==
Bernard Chant and Max Gavarry at International Flavors & Fragrances (IFF) created this fragrance. IFF had recently synthesized Iso E Super which had an ambery wood scent and it had not yet been used in a perfume. Creating a new material is expensive, so their first use is important: if it is introduced in a popular product that increases demand for it in other fragrances. Halston insisted that he wanted a wholly original fragrance; using the new material was a good fit for a fragrance from a fashion couture house. Starting with a fruity chypre accord, Chant and Gavarry added an overdose (for that time) of Iso E Super to give Halston its notable cedarwood note, and added up to 2.2 percent vanillin to provide a smooth amber base.

The fragrance has green, citrusy top notes; woody, floral middle notes; and woody base notes:

Top notes
Primarily green notes and marigold; also bergamot, melon, peach, and spearmint
Middle notes
Primarily cedarwood from Iso E Super; also carnation, iris, jasmine, rose, and ylang-ylang
Base notes
Primarily patchouli; also amber, incense, musk, oakmoss, sandalwood, and vetiver

While Halston was the first fragrance to use Iso E Super, many others soon followed in increasingly high amounts, such as:

- Christian Dior Fahrenheit (1988) with 25 percent
- Lancôme Tresor (1990) with 18 percent
- Shiseido-Serge Lutens Féminité du Bois (1992) with 43 percent
- Hermès Terre d’Hermès (2006) with 55 percent
- Lalique Perles de Lalique (2006) with 80 percent
- Escentric Molecules Molecule 01 (2006), made entirely of diluted Iso E Super

== Bottle ==
Elsa Peretti designed the bottle in the late 1960s, before the fragrance was created. It took the shape of a necklace pendant bud vase she created for Giorgio di Sant' Angelo but with a slightly tilted neck.

While Halston was the fashion company that licensed its name and creative efforts for the fragrance, it was manufactured and distributed through Max Factor (which was also owned by Norton Simon). Max Factor had problems filling the bottle because of the tilted neck. Halston was still determined to use Peretti's design, so he spent almost $50,000 of his own money to create an adapter for the filling nozzles.

In return for designing the bottle, Halston offered Peretti either $25,000 or a $35,000 sable coat (equivalent to $155,166 and $217,232 in 2026); in the end, he gave her both.

== Fragrance line extensions ==
- Halston Sheer (1998): a lighter reinterpretation
- Halston Woman (2009): a reinterpretation for a brand relaunch, created by Carlos Benaïm at IFF
- Halston Woman Amber (2010)

== Ownership timeline ==
- 1973: Norton Simon Inc. acquired Halston's business, services, and name for $10 million in stock. Halston's (the designer) first assignment for Norton Simon was to create a new fragrance for the Norton Simon subsidiary, Max Factor. Max Factor already had both drugstore and prestige fragrance lines, having started with Le Parfum Max (1925) followed by others, and having acquired the French perfume house Corday in 1961 but its core identity was one of mass-market cosmetics. A new fragrance from Halston could give Max Factor a new prestige fragrance with a modern fashion identity and a path to the counters of department stores that already sold Halston clothes.
- 1975: Halston (1975) was released via Max Factor.
- 1983: Esmark, Inc. bought Norton Simon for $900 million, bringing Halston under its corporate umbrella, under their Playtex underwear division.
- 1984: Beatrice Foods bought Esmark for $2.7 billion, and dismantled everything of the Halston company except the fragrances and J.C. Penney line of clothing.
- 1986: BCI Holdings Corporation, a shell company created by KKR & Co., bought Beatrice in a $6 billion leveraged buyout.
- 1986: Revlon bought Halston, Max Factor, and Almay from BCI Holdings for about $375 million and placed Halston in its prestige fragrances division.
- 1992: Four unnamed Saudi brothers bought Revlon's Borghese and Halston fragrance lines; the new company was named Halston Borghese International Ltd.
- 1996: French Fragrances, Inc. bought four Halston fragrances (Halston, Z-14, 1-12, and Catalyst) from Halston Borghese International Ltd.
- 2000: French Fragrances, Inc. (FFI) bought Elizabeth Arden from Unilever for $240 million.
- 2001: FFI changed its name to Elizabeth Arden, Inc.
- 2016: Revlon bought Elizabeth Arden, Inc. (formerly FFI) for $870 million, bringing Halston back under their ownership.
