= Smeller =

Smeller may refer to:

- Witch smeller, a title amongst the Zulu and other Bantu-speaking peoples of Southern Africa
- Smeller (installation), an installation by the Berlin-based artist Wolfgang Georgsdorf.
  - Osmodrama
- Smeller, an informal term for the nose.

== See also ==
- Smell (disambiguation)
