= Human maximisation test =

The Human maximisation test (HMT) is a test method for testing for contact allergens. It was first developed by Albert Kligman in 1966 and updated by Kligman and William Epstein in 1975. The first paper appeared 1966 and was a citation classic in 1985.

The test uses human medical volunteers (usually 25) and sodium laureth sulphate to maximise. Because of the potentially large human reaction, it is generally not considered ethical to use today. It does not have a guideline under the OECD Guidelines for the Testing of Chemicals. It has been compared with the murine local lymph node assay

== See also ==
- Patch test
