= Melt =

Melt may refer to:

== Science and technology ==
- Melting, in physics, the process of heating a solid substance to a liquid
- Melt (manufacturing), the semi-liquid material used in steelmaking and glassblowing
- Melt (geology), magma
  - Melt inclusions, a feature of igneous rock
- Meltwater, water released from the thawing of snow and ice
- MLT framework, a software test tool for the Media Lovin' Toolkit
- Melt, one of the former names for the American social media app Gas.

== Music ==
- Melt (band), a four-piece formed in New York City in 2017
- Melt! Festival, a former music festival at Ferropolis in Germany

=== Albums ===
- Melt (Straitjacket Fits album), a 1990 album by Straitjacket Fits
- Melt (Rascal Flatts album), a 2002 album by Rascal Flatts
- Melt, a 2018 extended play by Shaed, featuring the song "Trampoline"
- Peter Gabriel (1980 album), a self-titled album also referred to as Melt
- Melt, a 2025 album by Not for Radio

=== Songs ===
- "Melt!", a 1982 song by Siouxsie and the Banshees
- "Melt", a track by Leftfield from their 1995 album Leftism
- "Melt", a 2003 song by Melanie C
- "Melt", a song by the band Supercell from their album Supercell
- "Melt", a 2010 song by the Mystery Jets from their album Serotonin
- "Melt", a 2018 song by Big Red Machine from their self-titled album
- "Melt", a 2020 song by Au5, Jeto, and Cristina Soto
- "Melt", a 2022 song by Kehlani from her album Blue Water Road

== People ==
- Melt van Schoor (born 1967), South Africa-born Namibian cricketer
- Melt Sieberhagen, South African actor

== Other uses ==
- Melt sandwich or cheese melt, a grilled sandwich

== See also ==
- Melty (disambiguation)
- Smelt (disambiguation)
