= Vetiver (disambiguation) =

Vetiver is a species of tropical grass, Chrysopogon zizanioides, native to India.

Vetiver may also refer to:

- Vétiver, a men's fragrance produced by Guerlain
- Vetiver (band), an American folk band
  - Vetiver (album), their debut album
- Vetiver System, a system of soil and water conservation
