= Melty =

Melty may refer to:

- Melty Group, a French digital infotainment media and publishing company
- Melty, a character in Sega's Shining Hearts video game

== See also ==
- Melting, the process of transitioning from a solid to a liquid
- Translational drift, a form of locomotion also known as "melty brain"
- Melty Blood, a Japanese visual novel and fighting game
- "Melty Love", Melty Case and 10th Melty Life, a single and two albums, respectively, by Shazna
- "Melty Tale Storage" a song by Minori Chihara
- Melt (disambiguation)
