= Wolfgang Georgsdorf =

Austrian painter and sculptor (born 1959)

Wolfgang Paul Georgsdorf (born 10 September 1959 in Linz, Austria) is an Austrian media artist, director, sculptor, musician, author, researcher, and inventor based in Berlin. He was founder and spokesman of Opal-so-nicht which resulted in a successful case against Gazprom and BASF in Dahme-Heideseen Nature Park, Brandenburg, Germany.

== Education ==
Georgsdorf was educated at the University of Art and Design Linz from 1977 until 1983. There, he was one of the founding members of the Stadtwerkstatt Linz and of the experimental music project Die Post.

== Career ==
=== Olfaction ===
He started to explore olfactory art in the 1980s. One of his early installations was shown at the Ars Electronica Festival in 1986. In 1996 he built the prototype of a mechanically controlled scent organ, the Smeller 1.0. In the exhibition Werk'Zeuge at the OÖ Landesmuseum (State Museum of Upper Austria) he presented Smeller 1.0 which was able to play hundreds of scents for the audience – and by the audience.

In 2011 he started to work on the Smeller 2.0, an electronically controlled scent organ. In 2012 the completed Smeller 2.0 was presented in the exhibition "Sinnesrausch" at the Austrian Kulturquartier from June until October. In 2013 Georgsdorf was honored for Smeller 2.0 with the Outstanding Artist Award. In 2016, he initiated an entire festival in Berlin for the newly developed art form Osmodrama – Storytelling with Scents. The festival explored the possibilities of olfactory art in conjunction with various other time-based art forms. In 2017 he received The Art and Olfaction Award by the L.A.-based Institute for Art and Olfaction.

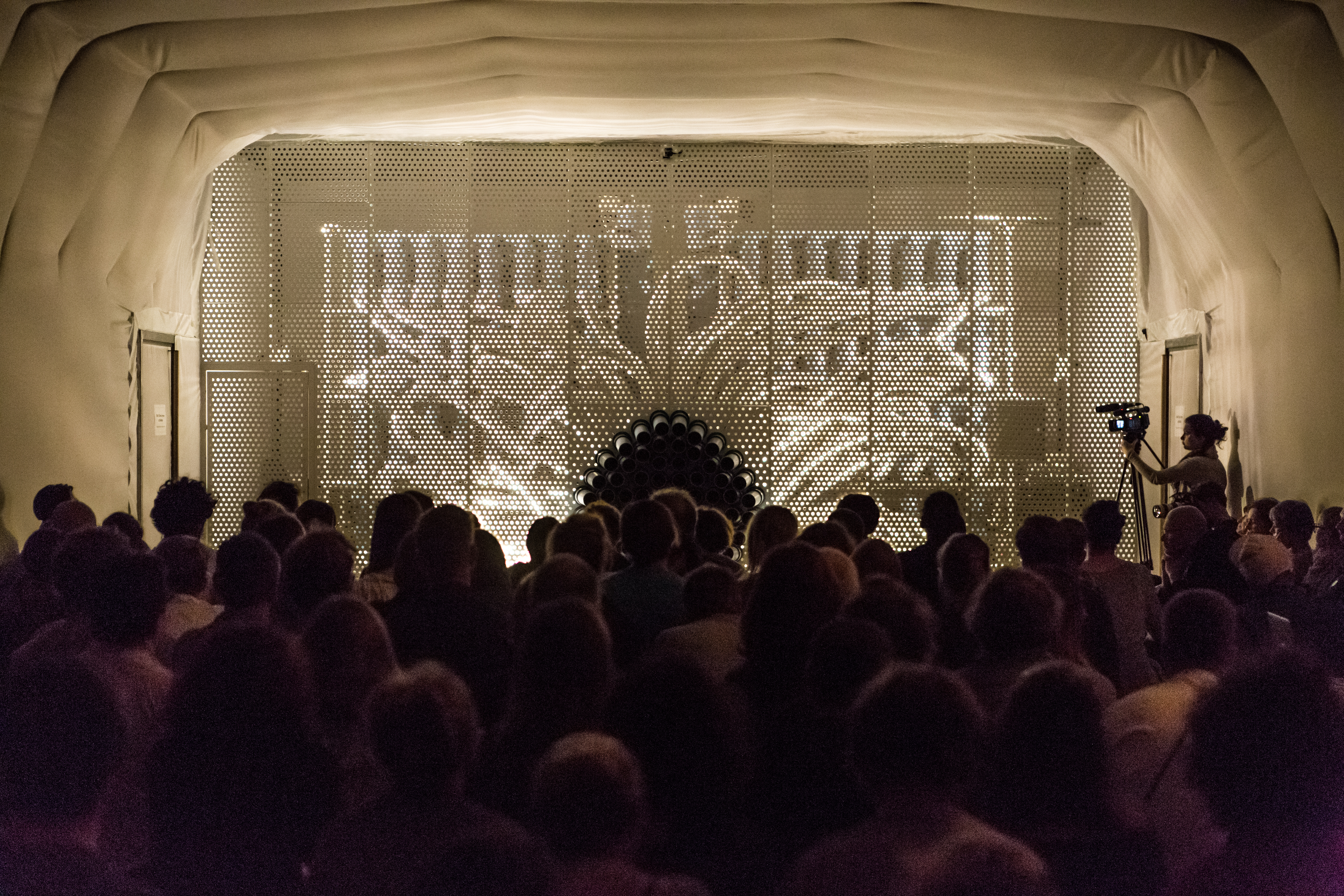
The Smeller 2.0

In 2018 he presented a further development of Smeller 2.0 and Osmodrama at Martin Gropius Bau Berlin for the exhibition "Welt ohne Außen" (World with No Outside) by Berliner Festspiele curated by Tino Sehgal and Thomas Oberender. In this exhibition with the subtitle "Immersive Spaces since the 1960s," alongside artists such as Doug Wheeler, Larry Bell, Lucio Fontana, Carsten Höller, Dominique Gonzalez-Foerster, Cyprien Gaillard, Tino Sehgal, Isabell Lewis, Nony de la Peña, Jeppe Hein, Georgsdorf premiered his Synosmy (an Osmodrama composition of scent sequences) "Quarter Autocomplete – Evolution in 12 Minutes". The piece was performed about 30 times per day over eight weeks. During that time he collaborated with scientists of the University Hospital Berlin Charité, University Hospital TU Dresden (Interdisciplinary Center for Smell and Taste), and a private Berlin clinic to conduct an evidence-based study on Osmodrama as a curative technology.

=== Sign language ===
In 2000, after seven years of study on the topic, Georgsdorf published the first digital bi-directional dictionary for Austrian Sign Language MUDRA in nine dialects. In the projects ~~sinnlos~~ and Deaf Dance, he dealt artistically with the subject, made video clips in sign language, organized clubbing events for the deaf and hearing and held scenic lectures on deaf culture.

In 2005 Georgsdorf was a speaker at Wikimania, the first Wikipedia world conference, where he presented his ideas on Hyperfilm and the introduction of sign languages to the Wikipedia platform considering that knowledge is not a domain of the literate world.

=== Music ===
His musical works besides his early work with Die Post include compositions for the Berliner Ensemble production of Heiner Müller's Duell-Traktor-Fatzer, compositions for his giant forest xylophone, his work as a violinist and conductor of the Berlin Improvisers Orchestra as well as collaborations with protagonists of new and improvised music such as Tristan Honsinger, Alexander von Schlippenbach, Stephen Crowe, Tom Jackson, Benedict Taylor, Miya, Niko Meinhold, Alison Blunt, Hui-Chun Lin, Anna Kaluza, and Manuel Miethe.

=== Media Art/Performance ===
From 1983 to 1986 he was am member of the group Minus Delta t and became a collaborator in the Bangkok Project, later The Project, which included the transportation of a 5.5-ton blue granite boulder from Stonehenge, England over land to India to be dropped into the Ganges River. The Project also included the immersion of a steel vault in the Indian Himalayas with a computer and keys distributed over Europe and Asia (The First Philosophical Databank in the Himalayas).

=== Film ===
Since 1977 Georgsdorf has been creating avant-garde films and has been a member of the Austria Filmmakers Cooperative since 1980.

=== Other fine arts ===
His drawings, paintings, and sculptures are in private and public collections. As a sculptor he created the metal sculpture Kuppel, shown at the Austrian Museum of Modern Art from 1983 to 1996. It is now at the OÖ Landesmuseum in Linz.

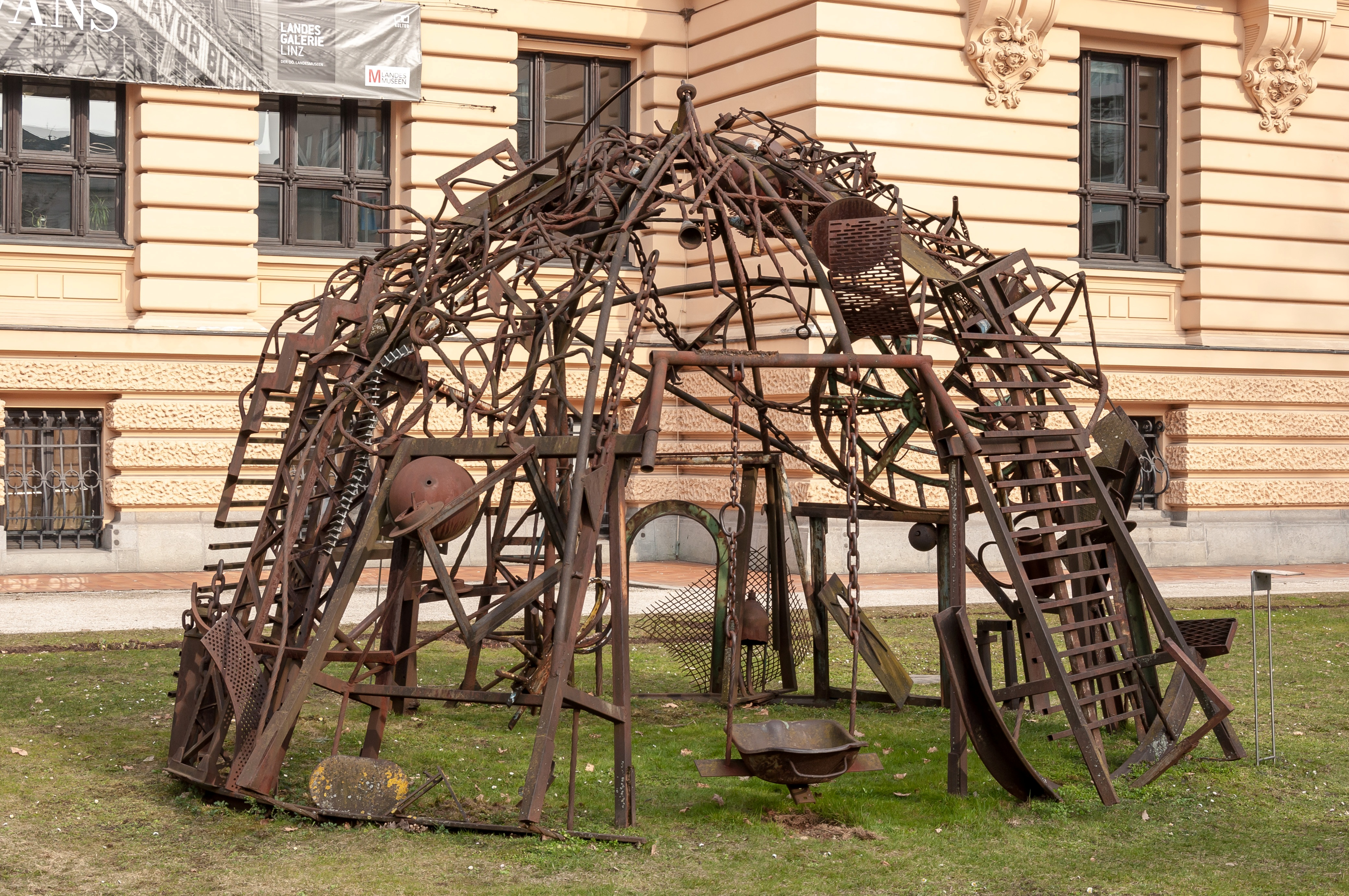
The Kuppel

== Community building ==
His political and social interventions include, among others, the civic movement Opal-so-nicht, which he founded in 2007 as the spokesman, and which resulted in a successful case against Gazprom and BASF in Dahme-Heideseen Nature Park.

== Personal life ==
Georgsdorf lives in Berlin with the actress Eva Mattes and two children. The actor Josef Mattes is their son.

== Selected exhibitions ==
- 1980: "Intelligenz der Hand," at Museum des 20. Jahrhunderts, Vienna (Group exhibition, contributing the large music sculpture Congress)
- 1983: Kuppel at Museum of Modern Art Vienna, Palais Liechtenstein
- 1988: Various Austrian Artists, Unge Kunstneres Samfund, Oslo, Norway
- 1990: "Decharge," Fondation Cartier, Paris / Jouy en Josas
- 1990: "Fünfte Lade," Galerie Hofkabinett and Small Gallery, Vienna.
- 1996: "Werk'zeuge Smeller 1.0", State Museum of Upper Austria
- 1996: Kuppel at OÖ. Landesmuseum Linz (Upper Austrian State Museum; art acquisition from the Museum of Modern Art Vienna into the permanent collection of the museum)
- 2003: "sinnlos – die Kunst / die Körper / die Fremdkörper", Künstlerhaus Graz, Graz
- 2005: "Auf wär men," Galerie Hofkabinett, Linz
- 2005: Phonorama, ZKM Center for Art and Media Karlsruhe
- 2006: "Balla Balla Bar," performance and exhibition, copyright project gallery, Berlin
- 2006-2013: Lesefährte Waldweisen (reading track Forest Ditty), Spree-forest Brandenburg public space
- 2008: großes Waldxylofon Brandenburg (Giant Forest Xylophone)
- 2008/2009: Lichtung, Copyright Projektbüro, Berlin
- 2011: Xylomat/Permanent Conference in "Jahr der Wälder" (Year of the Woods), Galerie ZS-Art Vienna, Museum of Lower Austria, Artmuseum Stift Klosterneuburg
- 2012: Smeller 2.0, Smeller 1.0 in Sinnesrausch, O. Ö. Kulturquartier, OK Center for Contemporary Art
- 2016: Osmodrama, St.-Johannes-Evangelist-Kirche, Auguststr. 90, Berlin (in cooperation with Radialsystem V and International Literaturefestival Berlin)
- 2018: Osmodrama, Martin Gropius Bau, Berlin. "Quarter Autocomplete" / Osmodrama via Smeller 2.0 Installation and Synosmie by Wolfgang Georgsdorf

== Selected filmography ==
- 1977: Sub und Ultra
- 1979: Rom
- 1980: Unter der Tonne (Under the barrel)
- 1981: Hängende Männer (Hanging Men)
- 1981: In the Dim of Proximity
- 1982: Gärtrommel (Fermentation Drum)
- 1985: Simultan Dolmetsch
- 1992: Salzburg Skizzen Tag und Nacht (Salzburg Sketches Day and Night)
- 1993: Zelt an der Donau (Tent at the Danube)
- 1995: Towards Human Rights
- 1999: Ballade Berlin
- 2008: Hammer
- 2012+: Video Series on Osmodrama

== Awards ==
- 1990 Fondation Cartier grant
- 2013 Outstanding Artist Award of the Austrian Federal Ministry for Art and Culture for Smeller 2.0
- 2017 Sadakichi Award / Art and Olfaction Award for Osmodrama Berlin 2016 for Smeller 2.0
- 2017 Nomination for the Art and Science Award, the Dresden Centre for Science and Art

== Bibliography ==
- Mudra, Multimedia Package on the Austrian Sign Language, Fischer Film 2001.
- Kinder-Mudra – training programme and digital dictionary of the Austrian Sign Language for children.
- Geruchsorgel in: Uli Marchsteiner, Peter Assmann, OÖ Landesmuseum (Hrsg.): Werk'Zeuge / Design des Elementaren. Bibliothek der Provinz, 1996, ISBN 3-85252-119-X, S. 141–143.
- Über das Riechen (About Smelling) in: Gottfried Hattinger, OÖ Landesmuseum (Hrsg.): Über die Sinne. Bibliothek der Provinz, 2006, ISBN 978-3-85252-731-4, p. 63.
- Protokoll einer Gründung (Foundation Protocol) In: OÖ Landesmuseum (Hrsg.): Stadtwerkstatt – In Arbeit 1979–1995. Triton Verlag Wien, ISBN 3-900746-86-9, p. 51–58.
- POST – Energische und augenblickliche Musik (founding of the music group POST) In: OÖ Landesmuseum (Hrsg.): Stadtwerkstatt – In Arbeit 1979–1995. Triton Verlag Wien, ISBN 3-900746-86-9, p. 65–77.
- Smeller in: Wolfgang Georgsdorf: Fächer. Fishnet Verlag, 1997, ISBN 3-901677-01-1, p. 50–51.
- Mudra in: Wolfgang Georgsdorf: Fächer. Fishnet Verlag, 1997, ISBN 3-901677-01-1, p. 52–55.
- Thomas Renoldner: Animation in Austria – 1832 until Today in: Christian Dewald, Sabine Groschup, Mara Mattuschka, Thomas Renoldner (Publisher): Die Kunst des Einzelbilds. Filmarchive Austria, ISBN 978-3-902531-66-7, p. 41–154. (Georgsdorf Im Gehäuse S. 134,143)
- Unrasierter Abfahrer In: Stadtwerkstatt (Hrsg.): Zeichnungen aus dem Umfeld (Stwst 1979–1999). Triton Verlag Wien, 2002, ISBN 3-85486-105-2, p. 35.
- Minus Delta t – The Project. Catalogue for the 6th Triennale New Delhi. Austrian Ministry for Education, Arts and Sports, 1986.
- Stadtwerkstatt (Publisher): Mögliche Antworten. Stadtwerkstatt Text, 1990.
- Rental catalog of the Austrian Filmmaker-Coop. Austrian Filmmaker-Coop, 1998 (Film Georgsdorf at page 29–30).
