= Α-Vetivone =

α-Vetivone

Names
- IUPAC name 4α,5α-Eremophila-1(10),7(11)-dien-2-one
- Systematic IUPAC name (4R,4aS)-4,4a-Dimethyl-6-(propan-2-ylidene)-4,4a,5,6,7,8-hexahydronaphthalen-2(3H)-one

Identifiers
CAS Number	15764-04-2
3D model (JSmol)	Interactive image
ChemSpider	390847
ECHA InfoCard	100.036.217
PubChem CID	442405
UNII	WA62V77MMV
CompTox Dashboard (EPA)	DTXSID60884848
- InChI: InChI=1S/C15H22O/c1-10(2)12-5-6-13-8-14(16)7-11(3)15(13,4)9-12/h8,11H,5-7,9H2,1-4H3/t11-,15+/m1/s1 Key: NIIPDXITZPFFTE-ABAIWWIYSA-N; InChI=1/C15H22O/c1-10(2)12-5-6-13-8-14(16)7-11(3)15(13,4)9-12/h8,11H,5-7,9H2,1-4H3/t11-,15+/m1/s1 Key: NIIPDXITZPFFTE-ABAIWWIYBZ
- SMILES: O=C2\C=C1\CC/C(=C(/C)C)C[C@@]1(C)[C@H](C)C2

Properties
Chemical formula	C_{15}H_{22}O
Molar mass	218.335
Appearance	colourless solid
Density	0.962 g/mL
Boiling point	270.5 °C (518.9 °F; 543.6 K)
Solubility in water	practically insoluble
Solubility in ethanol	soluble
Solubility in diethyl ether	soluble

Related compounds
- Except where otherwise noted, data are given for materials in their standard state (at 25 °C [77 °F], 100 kPa). Infobox references

α-Vetivone is an organic compound that is classified as a sesquiterpene (derived from three isoprene units). It is a major component of the oil of vetiver, which is used to prepare certain high value perfumes.

α-Vetivone is isolated by steam distillation of the roots of the grass Vetiveria zizanioides. Two other components of this distillate are the sesquiterpenes khusimol and β-vetivone shown below.

Structure of khusimol, another fragrant component of the oil of vetiver.

Structure of β-vetivone, another fragrant component of the oil of vetiver.
