= Guinea pig maximisation test =

The Guinea pig maximisation test (GPMT) is an in vivo test to screen for substances that cause human skin sensitisation (i.e. allergens). It was first proposed by B. Magnusson and Albert Kligman in 1969 and described in their 1970 book Allergic Contact Dermatitis in the Guinea Pig.

The test is composed of two phases, the induction phase and the challenge phase. The induction phase includes exposing a test group of animals twice to the test material, first by intradermal injection followed by topical application seven days later. During Induction A, the test animals are exposed intradermally to the test material, along with an adjuvant to enhance the immune reaction of the guinea pig. During Induction B, the topical induction, the test group is exposed to the test article for 48 hours, occluded.

The guinea pigs are then a short while later exposed to a lower concentration of the test material, and their allergic reaction, if any, measured. 15% of guinea pigs must show a reaction for the test to be considered positive. 20 animals would typically be used to ensure against false negative results.

The OECD Guidelines for the Testing of Chemicals guideline No. 406.

The test has been largely superseded by the murine local lymph node assay. D.A. Basketter and E.W. Scholes reviewed them in 1992

The REACH Regulation, Annex VII, paragraph 8.3 states "The Murine Local Lymph Node Assay (LLNA) is the first-choice method for in vivo testing. Only in exceptional circumstances should another test be used. Justification for the use of another test shall be provided."
