= Smelt =

Smelt may refer to:

- Smelt (fish) or Osmeridae, a family of small fish, including the Great Lakes smelts and whitebait smelts
- Australian smelt in the family Retropinnidae and species Retropinna semoni
- Big-scale sand smelt Atherina boyeri
- Deep-sea smelt in the family Bathylagidae
- Herring smelt of the family Argentinidae
- Mediterranean sand smelt, Atherina hepsetus
- New Zealand smelt in the family Retropinnidae and species Retropinna retropinna
- Smelt-whiting in the family Sillaginidae
- Smelts, some species in Silverside family Atherinidae

== See also ==
- Smell (disambiguation)
- Smelting, a chemical process
