= Halston (fashion house) =

American fashion house

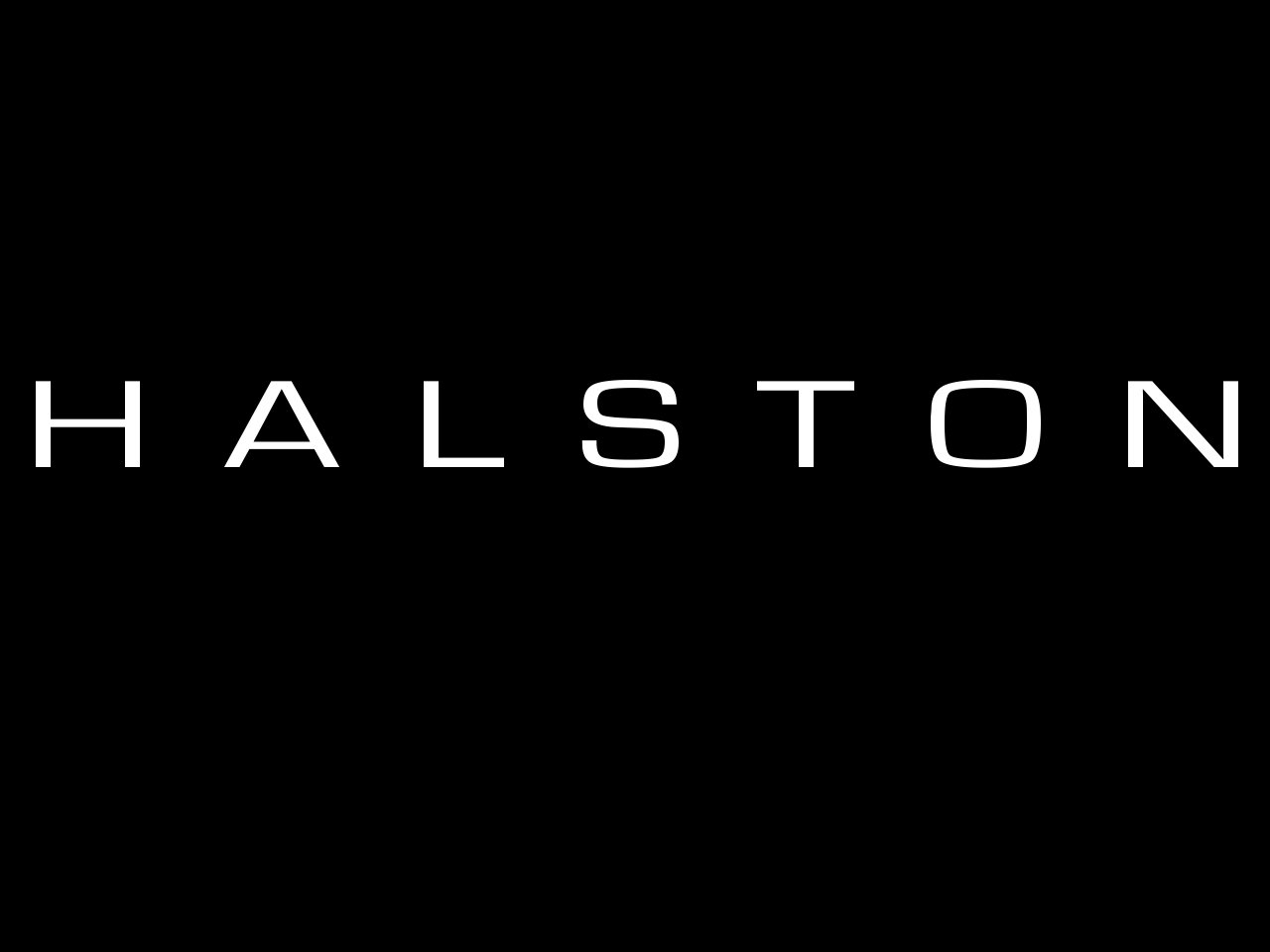
- Founded: 1966
- Founder: Halston
- Website: https://halston.com/

Halston is an American fashion house founded by designer Roy Halston Frowick in 1966. Halston became internationally known during the 1970s for minimalist yet glamorous womenswear associated with the disco era and New York nightlife. The brand became synonymous with Studio 54 culture, celebrity fashion, and modern American ready-to-wear. Halston's designs, characterized by clean lines, fluid silhouettes, and luxurious fabrics such as cashmere, jersey, and Ultrasuede, helped redefine American fashion.

The company expanded rapidly during the 1970s through licensing agreements and diffusion lines, becoming one of the first American designer brands to market products across multiple price points. The fashion house has undergone numerous ownership and creative changes since the 1980s.

== History ==
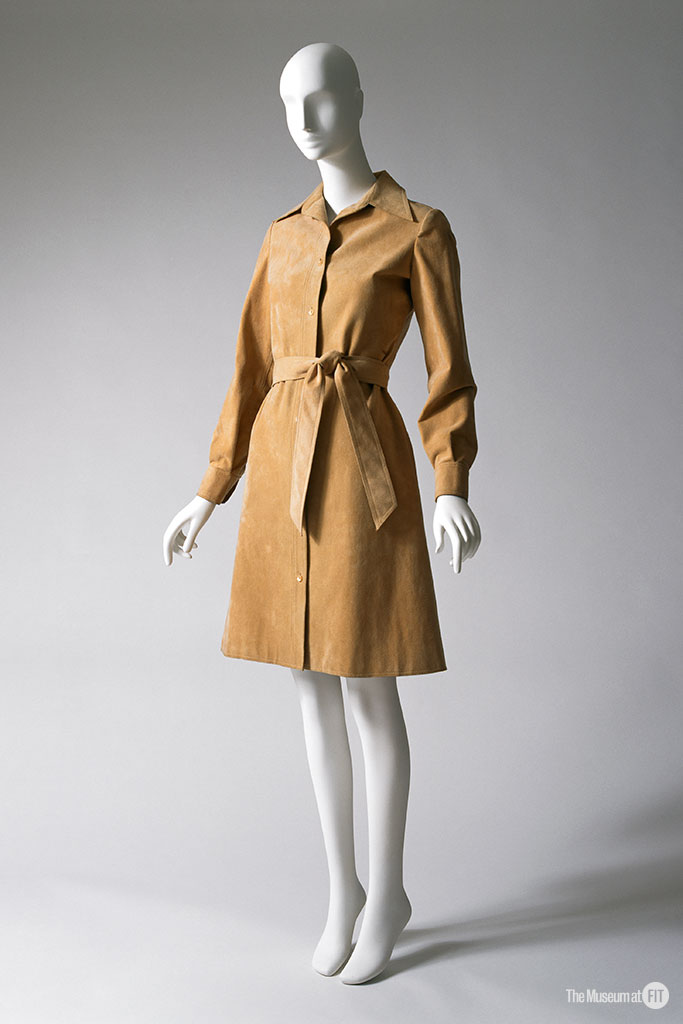
Halston Ultrasuede shirt dress, 1972

=== Founding and early success ===
The fashion house was established by fashion designer Roy Halston Frowick, who initially gained recognition as a milliner in Chicago before moving to New York City in the late 1950s. Halston rose to national prominence after designing the pillbox hat worn by Jacqueline Kennedy at the 1961 presidential inauguration of John F. Kennedy.

In 1966, Halston expanded into womenswear and designed clothes for the Halston label sold at Bergdorf Goodman. He opened his first boutique on Madison Avenue in 1968 and launched a ready-to-wear line in 1969. By the early 1970s, the company had become one of the most influential American fashion brands. Halston's designs emphasized simplicity, sensuality, and ease of movement, often using draping and minimal seams. Signature garments included caftans, shirtwaist dresses, jumpsuits, and bias-cut evening gowns.

Halston's clientele included celebrities and socialites such as Liza Minnelli, Bianca Jagger, Elizabeth Taylor, Lauren Bacall, and Anjelica Huston. The designer and his entourage became fixtures of New York nightlife, especially at Studio 54.

=== Expansion and licensing ===
In 1973, the Halston businesses were acquired by Norton Simon Inc. and renamed Halston Enterprises, although Halston remained lead designer. In 1975, Halston (through the Max Factor division of Norton Simon) released Halston (fragrance), which within two years became one of the top-selling fragrances in history.

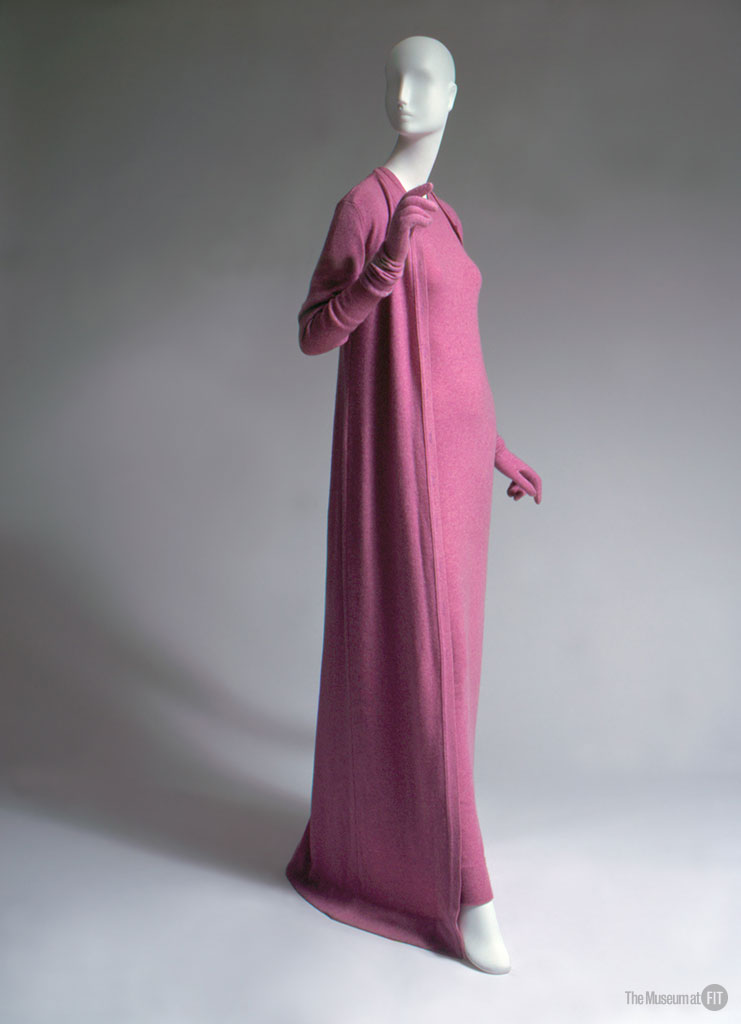
Halston evening ensemble, c. 1973

During the 1970s, the company expanded aggressively into licensing, producing perfumes, luggage, home furnishings, wigs, uniforms, and accessories under the Halston name. In 1978, he relocated the headquarters to the top of the Olympic Tower at 641 Fifth Avenue in Manhattan. By the early 1980s, Halston Enterprises reportedly generated annual sales exceeding $150 million, including $40 million in cosmetics.

The fashion house became a pioneer of designer diffusion lines. In 1983, Halston signed a licensing agreement with JCPenney to create the lower-priced "Halston III" collection. While the partnership anticipated the future mass-market collaborations of luxury brands, it was controversial within the fashion industry. Bergdorf Goodman subsequently dropped the Halston label, damaging the company's prestige.

=== Loss of control and later acquisitions ===
During the 1980s, corporate restructuring and licensing disputes gradually reduced Halston's control over the company bearing his name. By 1984, he had lost significant authority within the business, and he was eventually barred from designing under the Halston label. He was succeeded by his assistant John David Ridge.

Halston Enterprises was eventually acquired by Revlon in 1986. Since then, the fashion house has changed ownership multiple times and undergone several revival attempts. After Revlon ceased production of the clothing division in 1990, the company was acquired by Borghese in 1992. In 1996, sportswear manufacturer Tropic Tex purchased the Halston clothing license, while Revlon retained rights to Halston fragrances.

=== 1990s revival and 2000s brand repositioning ===
Designer Randolph Duke was hired to relaunch the label, debuting his first collection in 1997 to positive reviews. Celebrities including Mariah Carey, Celine Dion, and Minnie Driver wore the revived designs. Duke departed in 1998 after the company was sold to the private equity firm Catterton-Simon.

Later in 1998, designer Kevan Hall was appointed head designer of the renamed House of Halston. His debut Spring 1998 collection received favorable critical attention. In 1999, Catterton-Simon sold Halston Enterprises to Neema Clothing. Hall left the company in 2000.

Following Hall's departure, owner James J. Ammeen sought to reposition Halston as a luxury fashion label and hired designer Bradley Bayou. Bayou's designs were worn by figures including Oprah Winfrey and Queen Latifah. He exited the company in 2005 following disagreements over advertising and financial support.

=== Halston Heritage and later relaunches ===
In 2006, fashion entrepreneur Tamara Mellon, stylist Rachel Zoe, and film producer Harvey Weinstein partnered with Hilco Consumer Capital to acquire Halston in another relaunch effort. Former Versace designer Marco Zanini was hired in 2007 after internal disagreements regarding the brand's direction.

Between 2007 and 2008, fashion historian and archivist Chris Royer served as Halston archivist and advisory board member, helping assemble the Hilco/Halston Archive consisting of more than 300 vintage Halston garments and related materials. Royer later curated the 2008 "Neiman Marcus Halston Glam" exhibition in San Francisco, and archive pieces were subsequently loaned to the 2014 traveling exhibition Halston and Warhol: Silver and Suede.

Zanini's first Halston collection debuted in 2008 to mixed reviews, and he departed later that year. British designer Marios Schwab joined the company in 2009. That same year, Halston launched the diffusion line Halston Heritage, which adapted archival Halston designs for contemporary audiences. Actress Sarah Jessica Parker wore Halston Heritage designs in the film Sex and the City 2 (2010) and was subsequently named president and chief creative officer of the mainline brand. During Parker's tenure, jeweler Jacqueline Rabun designed accessories for the company.

Schwab's collections received largely negative reviews, and by 2011 both Parker and Weinstein had exited the company. Later that year, Hilco Consumer Capital consolidated ownership and appointed former BCBG Max Azria president Ben Malka as chairman and chief executive officer. Malka recruited former Hervé Léger and Max Azria creative director Marie Mazelis to oversee the relaunch of the contemporary line, while the company shifted its focus primarily to Halston Heritage.

=== Relocation and licensing ===
In 2012, Halston relocated its headquarters from New York City to Los Angeles. The following year, Halston Heritage entered a distribution agreement with the Majid Al Futtaim Group for the United Arab Emirates market. In 2014, the H by Halston and H Halston labels were sold to Xcel Brands.

The brand's Fall 2018 collection emphasized athleisure-inspired apparel. In 2022, fashion executive Ken Downing was appointed creative director of Halston. That same year, Halston was identified as a subsidiary in Revlon's bankruptcy proceedings under the name BrandCo Halston 2020 LLC.

In May 2023, G-III Apparel Group announced the signing of a 25-year master licensing agreement with Xcel Brands, Inc. for the Halston brand.
