= Local lymph node assay =

Toxicological test

The murine local lymph node assay (LLNA) is an in vivo test for skin sensitisation.

LLNA has largely superseded the guinea pig maximisation test and the Buehler test. It is considered more scientific and less cruel (lower number of animals; less suffering) and has found broad scientific and regulatory acceptance.

The principle underlying the LLNA is that skin sensitizers induce growth of lymphocytes in the lymph nodes draining the site of application. Lymphocyte proliferation can be measured by radiolabeling (quantifying tritiated thymidine), bioluminescence (quantifying ATP content in lymphocytes) or immunoassay (ELISA utilizing an antibody specific for BrdU).

The test material is applied to the ears of mice. Optionally, a tracer substance such as 3H-Methyl-thymidine or BrdU is injected intraperitoneally for lymphocyte incorporation. The animals are euthanized and their lymph node cells are removed and analyzed. The ratio of tracer incorporation in lymph nodes from dosed animals is compared to control animals, giving a stimulation index (SI). When the stimulation index exceeds 3 (SI > 3), a relevant sensitizing potential is assumed. In contrast to the classical guinea pig tests, the LLNA provides a quantitative measurement of sensitizing potency of a tested chemical.

The LLNA may not be appropriate for certain metallic compounds, surfactants, high-molecular-weight proteins, strong dermal irritants, and materials that do not sufficiently adhere to the ear for an acceptable period of time during treatment. There is no absolute conformity in the sensitizing potential of a substance in mouse, guinea pig and human.

== Regulatory ==
The OECD Guidelines for the Testing of Chemicals guideline No. 429 of 23 July 2010. The BrdU-ELISA method and the BrdU-FCM method are described in OECD Test Guideline No. 442B.

The REACH Regulation, Annex VII, paragraph 8.3 states "The Murine Local Lymph Node Assay (LLNA) is the first-choice method for in vivo testing. Only in exceptional circumstances should another test be used. Justification for the use of another test shall be provided."

According to European Guideline OECD 406 Skin Sensitization, the LLNA or the MEST (Mouse ear swelling test) can be used as a first stage in the assessment of skin sensitization potential. If a positive result is seen in either assay, a test substance may be designated as a potential sensitizer, and it may not be necessary to conduct a further guinea pig test. However, if a negative result is seen in the LLNA or MEST, a guinea pig test (preferably a GPMT or BT) must be conducted.
