= Osmodrama =

Osmodrama: from the Greek osme (smell) and the ancient Greek dráma (plot), describes the performance of time-based olfactory art using the experimental scent-playing ‘organ’ Smeller 2.0, as well as the festival Osmodrama – Storytelling with Scents.

The first version of Smeller was created in 1990 by the now Berlin-based Austrian artist Wolfgang Georgsdorf who with his team continues with research and development of the project.

== The Festival ==
Osmodrama – Storytelling with Scents, the first festival of kinetic scent performance took place from 15 July 2016 to 18 September 2016 in the St. Johannes Evangelist Church in the centre of Berlin. Visitors experienced different stagings of odour sequences. The program included readings, concerts, scent-synchronised films, workshops, panel discussions with international artists and cultural workers as well as researchers and scientists. Other contributors to the festival included Omer Fast, Eva Mattes, Carl Stone, Julia Kissina, Nikola Madzirov, Hanns Hatt, Geza Schön, Stephen Crowe, Simon van der Geest, Phill Niblock, Sam Auinger, Aisha Orazbayeva, Tom Jackson, Samuel Stoll, Filip Caranica and The Berlin Improvisers Orchestra.

The festival Osmodrama – Storytelling with Scents was realized in cooperation with the International Literature Festival Berlin, the Radialsystem V, by sponsors such as the Ernst Schering Foundation and by crowdfunding.

== Exhibitions ==
- 2012 – OK Center for Contemporary Art at OÖ Kulturquartier in Linz/Austria in the major exhibition „Sinnesrausch“ (Sensory Sensation) with allegedly 77k visitors in 3 months. The OÖ Kulturquartier and OK Center was coproducing the production, premiere and Beta-Testing of Smeller 2.0 in 2012.
- 2016: Osmodrama, St.-Johannes-Evangelist-Kirche, Auguststr. 90, Berlin (in cooperation with Radialsystem V and International Literaturefestival Berlin).
- 2018: Osmodrama, Martin Gropius Bau, Berlin. „Quarter Autocomplete“ / Osmodrama via Smeller 2.0 Installation and Synosmy by Wolfgang Georgsdorf.

== Osmodrama in the media ==
There is an increasing number of reports on Osmodrama internationally by broadcasters such as the BBC (British Broadcasting Cooperation), the CBC (Canadian Broadcasting Cooperation), Marketplace, websites such as The Outline, perfume politics, JASTS (Japanese Association for the Study of Taste and Smell) and by print media such as die ZEIT and the Süddeutsche Zeitung.

== Awards ==
On May 6, 2017, the US Institute for Art and Olfaction honored Osmodrama with the Sadakichi Award for Experimental Work with Scents. 2013: Outstanding Artist Award (by the Austrian Ministry of Culture) for Smeller 2.0.
