= Buehler test =

Medical procedure

The Buehler test is an in vivo test to screen for substances that cause human skin sensitisation (i.e. allergens). It was first proposed by Edwin Vernon Buehler in 1965 and further explained in 1980. The methods are described in OECD Test Guideline 406 and the US Environmental Protection Agency (USEPA) OSCPP 870.2600.

It is a non-adjuvant test. During the Main Test, guinea pigs in the test group are induced with the highest concentration of a substance that causes up to slight irritation. During the challenge phase, guinea pigs in the test group and the control group are given a challenge dose, which is the highest dose that does not cause irritation.

Sensitization of the test system is evaluated following the challenge exposure by comparing the extent and degree of skin reactions in the Test Group to the Control Group. A positive response is defined as a score of at least 1.0 and that exceeds the highest response observed in the Control Group. While the scoring system is relative, the most important criterion of an overall positive response is whether the Test Group animals are more responsive than the Control Group animals following the challenge exposure; this comparison allows discrimination between reactions of hypersensitivity versus skin irritancy.

To evaluate the sensitization potential of a test article, two endpoints are used: incidence and severity.

- Incidence is the percentage of animals that exhibited a positive response at either 24 or 48 hours following the challenge exposure when compared to the total number of animals in the group. For a test article to be considered a sensitizer in the Buehler test, at least 15% of the Test Group must exhibit positive responses.
- Severity is the sum of scores divided by the total number of animals is used to compare the Test and Control Group responses. If the severity of the responses of the Test Group is greater than the Control Group, then a rechallenge may be warranted.
