= Khusimol =

Identifiers
CAS Number	16223-63-5
3D model (JSmol)	Interactive image
ChEMBL	ChEMBL511334
ChemSpider	146550
PubChem CID	167519
UNII	T4N33ECG0W
CompTox Dashboard (EPA)	DTXSID80936671
- InChI: InChI=1S/C15H24O/c1-10-13-5-4-12(9-16)15(13)7-6-11(8-15)14(10,2)3/h11-13,16H,1,4-9H2,2-3H3/t11-,12-,13-,15+/m1/s1 Key: OOYRHNIVDZZGQV-BHPKHCPMSA-N
- SMILES: CC1(C2CCC3(C2)C(CCC3C1=C)CO)C

Properties
Chemical formula	C_{15}H_{24}O
Molar mass	220.356 g·mol^{−1}
- Except where otherwise noted, data are given for materials in their standard state (at 25 °C [77 °F], 100 kPa). Infobox references

Khusimol is a sesquiterpene found in oil of vetiver. It contains a tricyclic hydrocarbon core, with a hydroxy methyl group, two methyl groups and a methylene group. It constitutes the biggest part of oil of vetiver, around 15%. The substance was initially discovered by D. C. Umarani in 1966 and separatated by using distillation and column chromatography.
