= Melt (band) =

American indie pop band

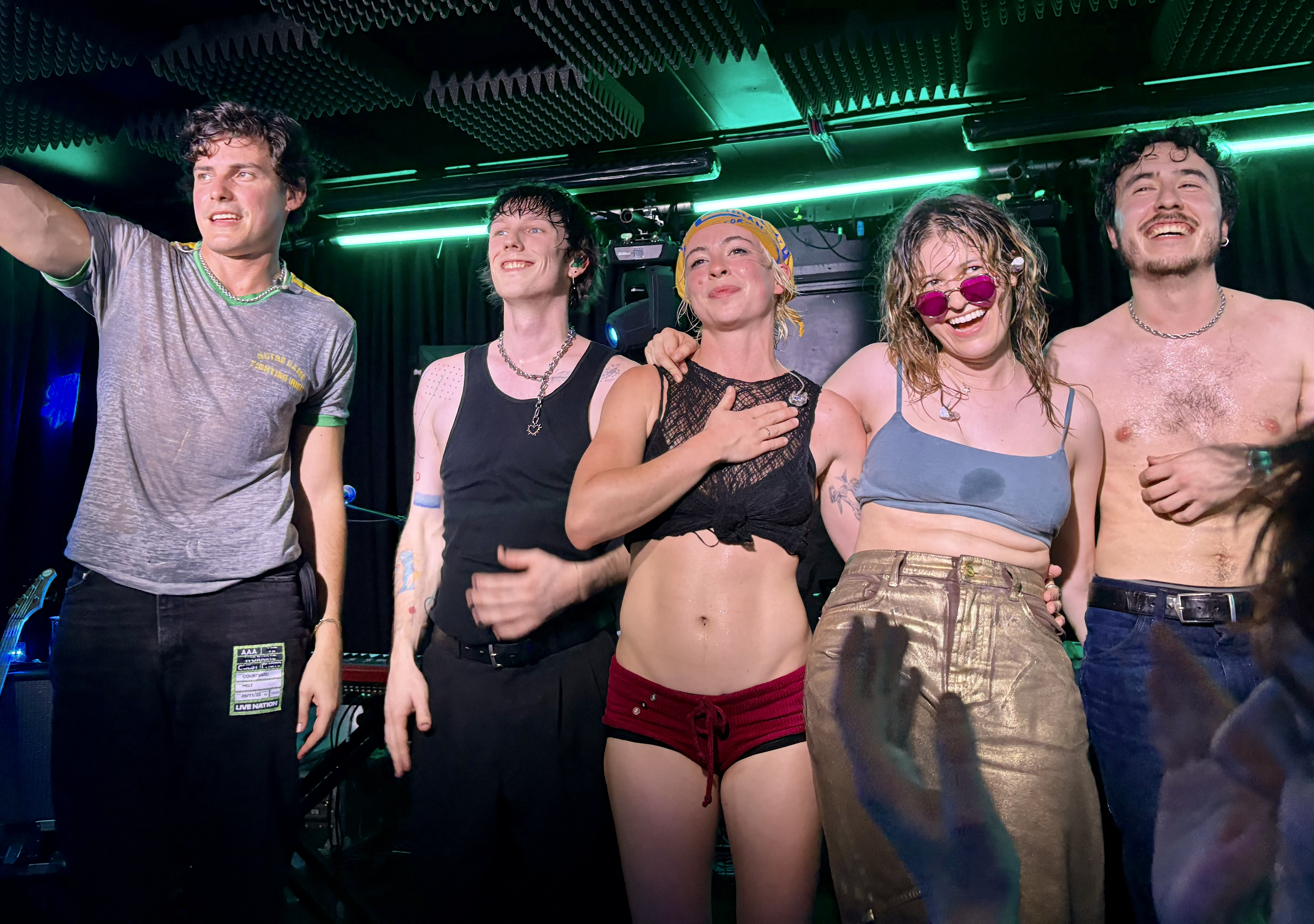
- Melt in November 2025. From left: Tor Miller (Note: Touring band member), Lucas Saur, Veronica Stewart-Frommer, Marlo Shankweiler, Andres Valbuena

Background information
- Origin: New York City, New York, United States
- Genre: Indie soul
- Years active: 2017–present
- Members: Veronica Stewart-Frommer; Marlo Shankweiler; Lucas Saur
- Past members: Aaron Alcouloumre; Eric Gabriel; Josh Greenzeig; Nick Sare

Melt is an American band formed in New York City in 2017, consisting of vocalist Veronica Stewart-Frommer, guitarist Marlo Shankweiler and bassist Lucas Saur. Their music encompasses the genres of soul, soft rock and indie pop. Following the success of their debut single "Sour Candy", the band independently released their extended play West Side Highway in 2021, and issued their first studio album, If There's a Heaven, in 2024.

== History ==
In their senior year of high school, New York City students Eric Gabriel and Veronica Stewart-Frommer formed the band with five others. Before settling on Melt, they considered naming the band Toast. After winning a local battle of the bands, the seven-piece recorded their first song "Sour Candy" on a whim in 2017. After its music video went viral on Reddit, the track reached No. 5 on the Billboard Viral 50 chart.

Melt released their debut extended play (EP), West Side Highway, on February 19, 2021. Stewart-Frommer said time spent in COVID-19 lockdowns allowed her and the band to "spend weeks on end together, hanging out and writing" the record, a previously-difficult task with members scattered between different colleges from Boston to Washington, D.C.

In September 2024, the group released their debut studio album, If There's a Heaven. It was recorded live-to-tape and produced by Sam Evian.

== Artistry ==
Melt's primary influences, according to Lily Goldberg of The Williams Record, include folk, jazz, R&B and soul music, with a unique sound that "goes beyond soul-pop or rock". Their lead vocals compare to Macy Gray, Sammy Rae & Reliably Bad. Their backup horns & keyboards give a refined nostalgic soul vibe. Stewart-Frommer and Gabriel are both self-taught musicians.

== Discography ==
Studio albums

● If There's a Heaven (Self-released; September 13, 2024)

No.	Title	Length
1.	"Fake Romantic"	4:42
2.	"Plant the Garden"	3:42
3.	"Your Name"	3:04
4.	"The Door"	3:56
5.	"Heaven"	3:16
6.	"Happy to Be Here"	2:34
7.	"Through the Wall"	3:03
8.	"Better Without You"	3:20
9.	"The Idiot"	3:07
10.	"Veronica's Apology"	3:25
11.	"Communion"	3:02
Total length:		37:16

Extended plays

● West Side Highway (Self-released; February 19, 2021)

No.	Title	Length
1.	"Don't Want Me"	3:33
2.	"Hours"	4:03
3.	"West Side Highway"	2:49
4.	"Never Be Alone"	3:23
5.	"Waves"	3:05
6.	"Brown Eyes"	3:55
Total length:		20:51
