= Geza Schön =

German master perfumer

Geza Schön is a German master perfumer born in Kassel and based in Berlin. He trained at Haarmann & Reimer (now Symrise) and has worked with Diesel, Ormonde Jayne, FCUK, biehl parfumkunstwerke, and Boudicca. Schön founded Escentric Molecules, a perfume line that focuses on single molecules, in 2006. He received the Outstanding Artist Award for Interdisciplinarity in 2016, then, in 2017, the Sadakichi Award for Experimental Work with Scent, together with Wolfgang Georgsdorf for "Osmodrama / Smeller 2.0".

== Creations ==
=== Biehl Parfumkunstwerke ===
- gs01
- gs02
- gs03

=== Boudicca ===
- Wode (2008)
- Wode (paint) - the notes are similar to Wode, but unlike it, Wode (paint) has blue color and is intentionally visible on the skin, therefore the name.

=== Clive Christian ===
- 1872 for Men (2001)
- X for Men (2001)

=== Diesel ===
- Diesel (1996)

=== Escentric Molecules ===
- Escentric 01 (2006, 2011)
- Escentric 02 (2008)
- Escentric 03 (2010)
- Escentric 04 (2017)
- Molecule 01 (2006)
- Molecule 02 (2008)
- Molecule 03 (2010)
- Molecule 04 (2017)
- Molecule 05 (2020)

=== FCUK ===
- Eau de FCUK (1999)

=== Feminista ===
- Feminista (2017)

=== Ormonde Jayne ===
- Ormonde Woman (2002)
- Champaca (2002)
- Tolu (2002)
- Fragipani Absolute (2003)
- Osmanthus (2003)
- Ormonde Man (2004)
- Ta'If (2004)
- Tiare (2009)
- Rose Gold (2016)
- Nawab of Oudh (2012)

=== mare ===
- eau du levant (2018)

== Awards ==
- 2017: Sadakichi Award for Experimental Work with Scent (with Wolfgang Georgsdorf)
