= Stadtwerkstatt =

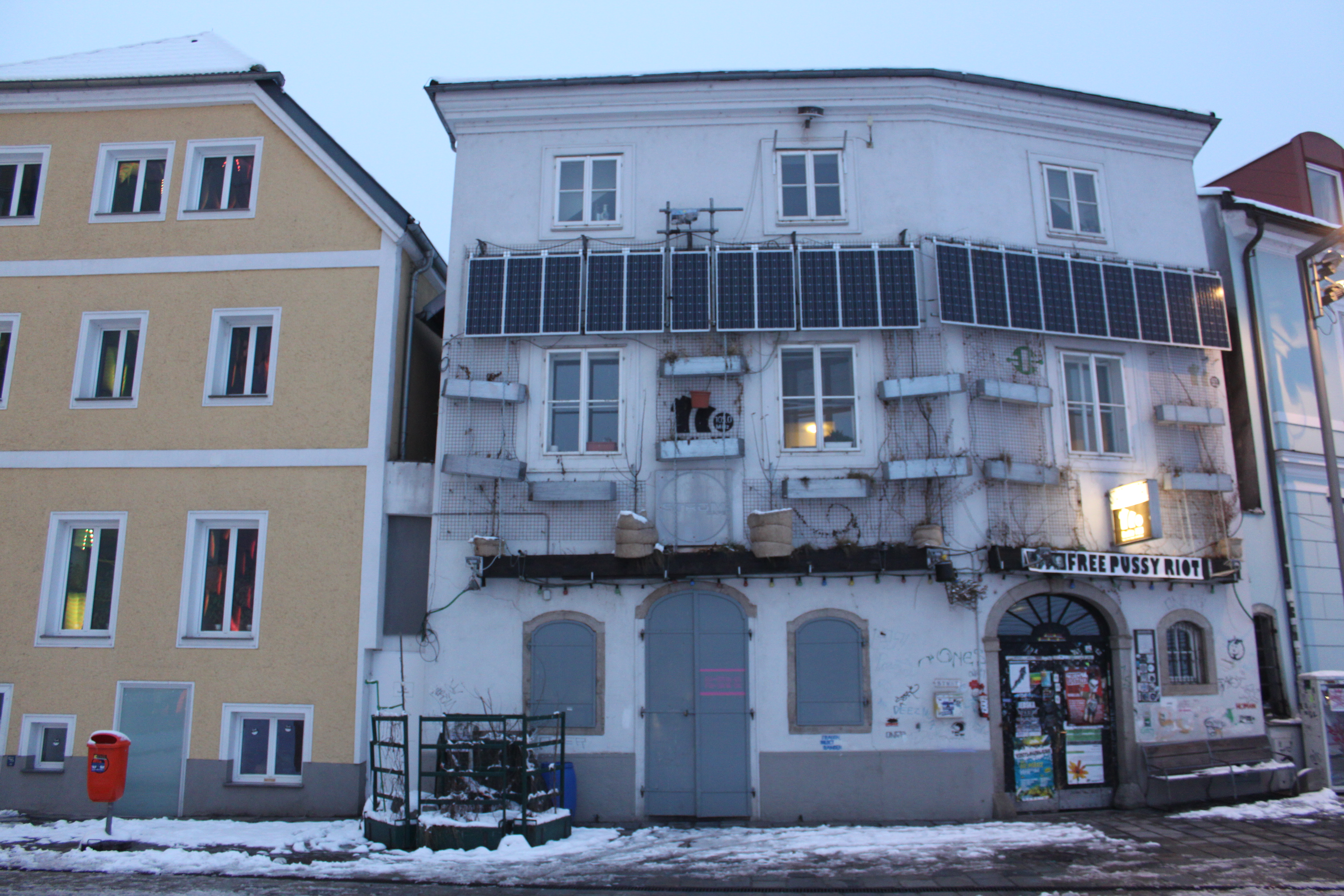
- The Stadtwerkstatt
- Interactive map of the Stadtwerkstatt area

General information
- Type: Center of culture and communication
- Location: Linz, Austria
- Coordinates: 48°18′36″N 14°17′5″E
- Inaugurated: 1979

Website
- Official Homepage of Stadtwerkstatt

The Stadtwerkstatt is an open event and project house in Linz. Founded in 1979 by young activists, it is the city's oldest autonomous cultural center. In addition to several music events each week, other cultural and artistic events are also held regularly. Three different associations operate in the Stadtwerkstatt building: the Friedhofstr 6 association (vulgo Stadtwerkstatt) with its Cafe Strom, art projects and events departments, as well as the non-commercial radio station Radio FRO and the net art and culture initiative servus.at.

== History ==
The Stadtwerkstatt was founded in 1979 as an association in Linz with the "aim of critically examining the conditions of life in the city and promoting cultural initiatives on a popular level."

In 1980, the association moved into a vacant factory building in the Urfahr district of Linz, near the Danube. The building was used for residential purposes as well as for exhibitions and events. Shortly before demolition was threatened in 1983, the association launched the "Sgraffito Alchemia" campaign, in which the entire building facade was designed. Nevertheless, the building was demolished in 1990 in favor of a dormitory, and the association moved to the much smaller building at Kirchengasse 4, which is owned by the municipality of Linz.

From March 2001, the building was fundamentally redesigned and renovated. The offices located in the building, as well as Radio FRO, moved temporarily until the reopening in May 2002. In 2006, the Stadtwerkstatt's events drew about 19,000 visitors.

On a quarterly basis, the Stadtwerkstatt publishes the newspaper Versorgerin, to which one can subscribe free of charge. In 2015, another cooperation with the newspaper die Referentin was started.

In 2010, an annual artists-in-residence program started on a houseboat in Linz's Winter Harbor.

In 2012, the currency Gibling was initiated under the label punkaustria.at. This depreciating currency loses value every year. Every year an artist is invited to design this currency. The artists were Oona Valerie, Leo Schatzl, Deborah Sengl, Michael Aschauer, Judith Fegerl, Julius Deutschbauer, Eva Grün, Peter Weibel, OrtnerSchinko, Shu Lea Cheang and Franz Xaver.

Since 2015, STWST48, an annual 48-hour showcase extravaganza, takes place in September. This international event presents the artistic productions of the Stadtwerkstatt in a concentrated form and also artists working on the respective theme. STWST48 is co-curated by the artist Shu Lea Cheang, among others, and its cooperation partner is Ars Electronica.

== Building ==
The Stadtwerkstatt was founded in a building at Friedhofstraße 6 and since 1990 has been located in the neighboring building at Kirchengasse 4, almost directly on the Danube, the Nibelungen Bridge and next to the Ars Electronica Center. The Stadtwerkstatt building houses the café and pub "Café Strom" on the ground floor, a large hall on the 1st floor as well as the studio of Radio FRO and an adjoining room often used as a bar or DJ room during events.

== Initiatives ==
In accordance with its goal as an association, the Stadtwerkstatt promoted "cultural initiatives" such as the "Independent Filmmakers Linz (ULF)" and participated in exhibitions and the production of plays. But the members and artists of the Stadtwerkstatt also regularly undertook - often unusual - actions themselves, such as an "escalator concert" in the shopping arcade of the Lentia 2000 building complex in 1983 or the "machine room concert" in the Linz "Galerie Hofstöckl" in 1982.

Poster exhibitions such as "4 years of optical megaphone" in 1984, as well as the design of the facade of the old Stadtwerkstatt building in 1983, or the facade painting "Glowing vehicle" in 1986, were also part of the artistic activities of the Stadtwerkstatt.

In 1995 the book for the exhibition of the same name "Stadtwerkstatt in Arbeit 1979-1995" was presented in the Landesgalerie. The artistic examination took place and takes place in all genres above all however in the social plastic and in the range of the new media. This led to the development of the art and culture server servus.at in 1996 and the non-commercial community radio station Radio FRO in 1998. Both initiatives are independent associations and work in the house of the Stadtwerkstatt.

=== STWST-TV ===
Video productions found their way into various film events and since the founding of "STWST-TV", which was rarely actually seen on television, the Stadtwerkstatt has been able to make its own broadcasting concepts accessible to larger groups of viewers on several occasions.

At the Wels Film Festival in 1987, "STWST-TV" presented a five-day live broadcast called "Hoteltelevision", which could be received in a Wels hotel using the hotel's own TV system. In 1989, "STWST-TV" was featured at the "Querspur" video festival, and in 1990, media activists in Buffalo, New York, broadcast a total of 12 hours of live interactive TV called "Shuffle Off To Buffalo" for six consecutive days, which 320,000 households were able to receive via cable. One of these broadcasts was scheduled to air on a date that normally included a weekly broadcast of radical Christians. In order to initially conceal from the viewers the fact that now "STWST-TV" was doing programming instead of the show usually taking place at this time, the broadcast began with Bible texts and a host dressed as a priest. This way, it was possible to reach an audience that would probably not have followed a program created by "STWST-TV" on its own. A total of seven broadcasts were aired, covering a range of topics from religious fanaticism, youth mania, U.S. invasionism, clichés about Austria, the U.S. image of Europe, punk as a concept of art, as well as an entire broadcast without sound.

Some other projects of the media artists:

In 1991 and 1992 "STWST-TV" created broadcasts for Ars Electronica with the mottos "Out Of Control" and "Endo and Nano", which were shown on 3sat and ORF 2. In 1993, a STWST-TV presentation was shown live on Channel 5 on Amsterdam cable. In the same year, the media group presented its program "CBB Por Ejemplo" at various universities in Cochabamba, Bolivia. All of the participants in the exhibition were then actually named honorary citizens of the city of Cochabamba.

All this innovative and creative media work did not go unappreciated, as in 1993 and 1994 there were several awards:

- Landeskulturförderungspreis for video art to Herbert Schager (1993).
- Talent Promotion Award of the Province of Upper Austria for Media Art to Thomas Lehner (1993)
- Provincial prize for initiative cultural work to the Stadtwerkstatt (1993)
- Appreciation Award for Media Art from the Federal Ministry of Science and Art (1994)

== Events ==
From the beginning, the Stadtwerkstatt organized numerous events of various kinds. There were exhibitions, plays, lectures and, of course, numerous concerts. In 1982, for example, Einstürzende Neubauten, Abwärts and also Konstantin Wecker played in the building at Friedhofstraße 6. In 1983, Hermann Nitsch read from his "Orgien-Mysterien-Theater".

In 1998 Black Market International was in Linz and presented performance and action art from November 16 to 20.

In addition to lectures and art events, the Stadtwerkstatt is known to a broad public primarily because of regular concerts by alternative - local and international - bands (rock, punk, electropop, etc.) and DJs (electronic music such as drum and bass and techno, hip-hop, reggae, etc.). In this context, the premises of the Stadtwerkstatt can often be rented by local organizers (mostly DJ collectives). In close cooperation with the Stadtwerkstatt, the organizers work on a smooth realization of the respective event.

For example, in February 2006 a two-day event of experimental electronic music took place, the "Interferenz 06 Extreme Music Meeting", which was organized by "Hirntrust Grind Media" and "Artonal". In addition to local bands, whose playing was accompanied and edited by the Japanese artist KK Null, and DJs from the regional collectives "Chemotaxis" and "Morphed", other experimental musicians and DJs from Germany, Australia, USA, Holland and Belgium (Sickboy) performed.
