= Dahme-Heideseen Nature Park =

Coordinates: 52°13′21″N 13°45′59″E

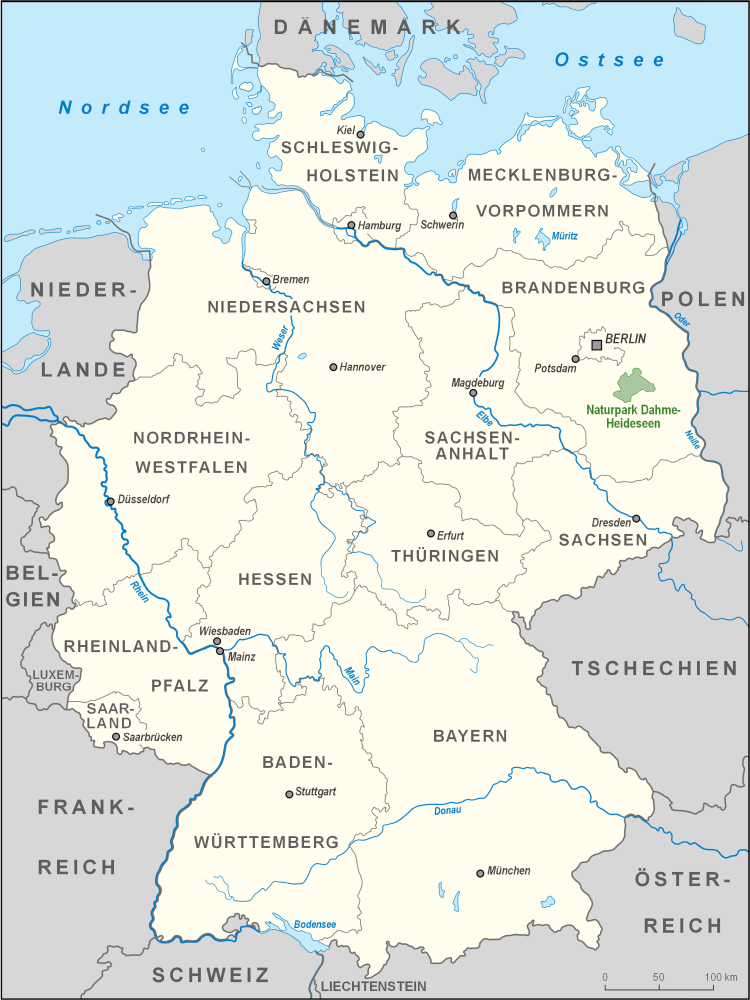

Dahme-Heideseen Nature Park is a nature park and reserve in the state of Brandenburg, Germany. It covers an area of 594 km^{2} (229 sq mi). It was established September 19, 1998 and is located southeast of Berlin.

== Flora and Fauna ==
Luch areas between Kolberg and Storkow, such as the Luchwiesen nature reserve, form a very special geological and botanical feature. Here, salt water rises to the surface through fissures in the bedrock. The beach trident, the Bodden rush (Juncus gerardii) and the beach milkweed (Glaux maritima) have adapted excellently to these unusual conditions. By far the largest populations of the "strictly protected" species great crested newt (Triturus cristatus) and fire-bellied toad (Bombina bombina) in the nature park are found in the Reichardtsluch east of Limsdorf, through which the Schwenowseegraben flows. Due to the representative regional focal occurrences of these species, the luch was included in the 2000s as a supplement to the Schwenower Forst FFH site in the Natura 2000 network (FFH site Schwenower Forst supplement).
