= Smeller (installation) =

Installation by Wolfgang Georgsdorf

Smeller 2.0
- Artist: Wolfgang Georgsdorf
- Year: 2012
- Medium: Installation (scent-based)
- Movement: Osmodrama
- Subject: Olfactory sequences, scent composition, time-based art
- Designation: Installation
- Location: Berlin
- Owner: Wolfgang Georgsdorf
- Preceded by: Smeller (1990)

Smeller (since 2012: Smeller 2.0) is an installation by the Berlin-based artist Wolfgang Georgsdorf, which as an instrument and medium enables the composing and precise broadcasting or performance of complex scent sequences. These can also be synchronized with simultaneously reproduced sounds, films, narrative texts, dance or theatre.

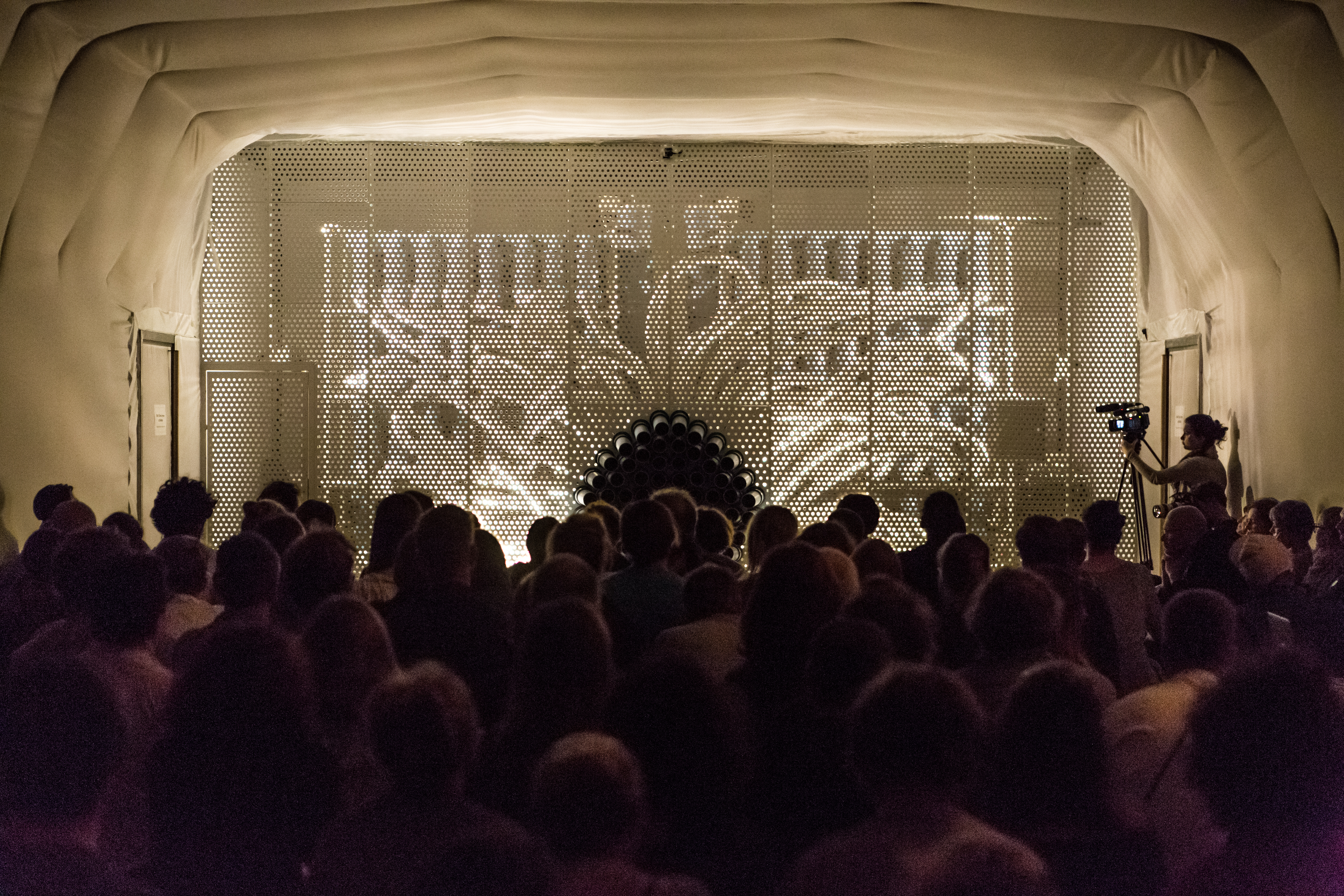
Smeller 2.0

== History ==
The first mechanically controllable prototype of a scent ‘organ’ (in the sense of a musical instrument) was invented by Wolfgang Georgsdorf in 1990 and demonstrated for the first time in the Oberösterreichisches Landesmuseum. Georgsdorf thus realized a time-based art form he called Osmodrama in order to enable the exploration and performance of olfactory sequences and ‘chords’. The instrument is used for staging, programming, recording and playback. Smeller 2.0, which can be played or controlled by MIDI, was first presented to the public in 2012 in the exhibition Sinnesrausch at the OK Center for Contemporary Art in the OÖ Kulturquartier in Linz, Austria. Georgsdorf cooperated with the perfumer Geza Schön for the development of the individual odour components. In the same place one year later, the native scent film "NO(I)SE 1" premiered during the film festival Crossing Europe.

In the same year Georgsdorf received the Austrian award "Outstanding Artist Award for Interdisciplinarity" for the project Smeller 2.0.

In 2016, Georgsdorf presented Smeller 2.0 in the nine-week event Osmodrama Berlin 2016 - Festival für Geruchskunst. In 2017 Wolfgang Georgsdorf received the Art and Olfaction Award for Osmodrama in the category 'Experimental Work with Scent'.

== Structure ==
The Smeller is a kind of musical 'organ' consisting of tubes and chambers. It is equipped with polypropylene pipes and aluminum hoses which deliver precisely dosed scents to a continuously existing air flow; overlays of different fragrances are thus avoided. The Smeller is operated in his current presentation form Smeller 2.0 via computer and/or MIDI keyboard.

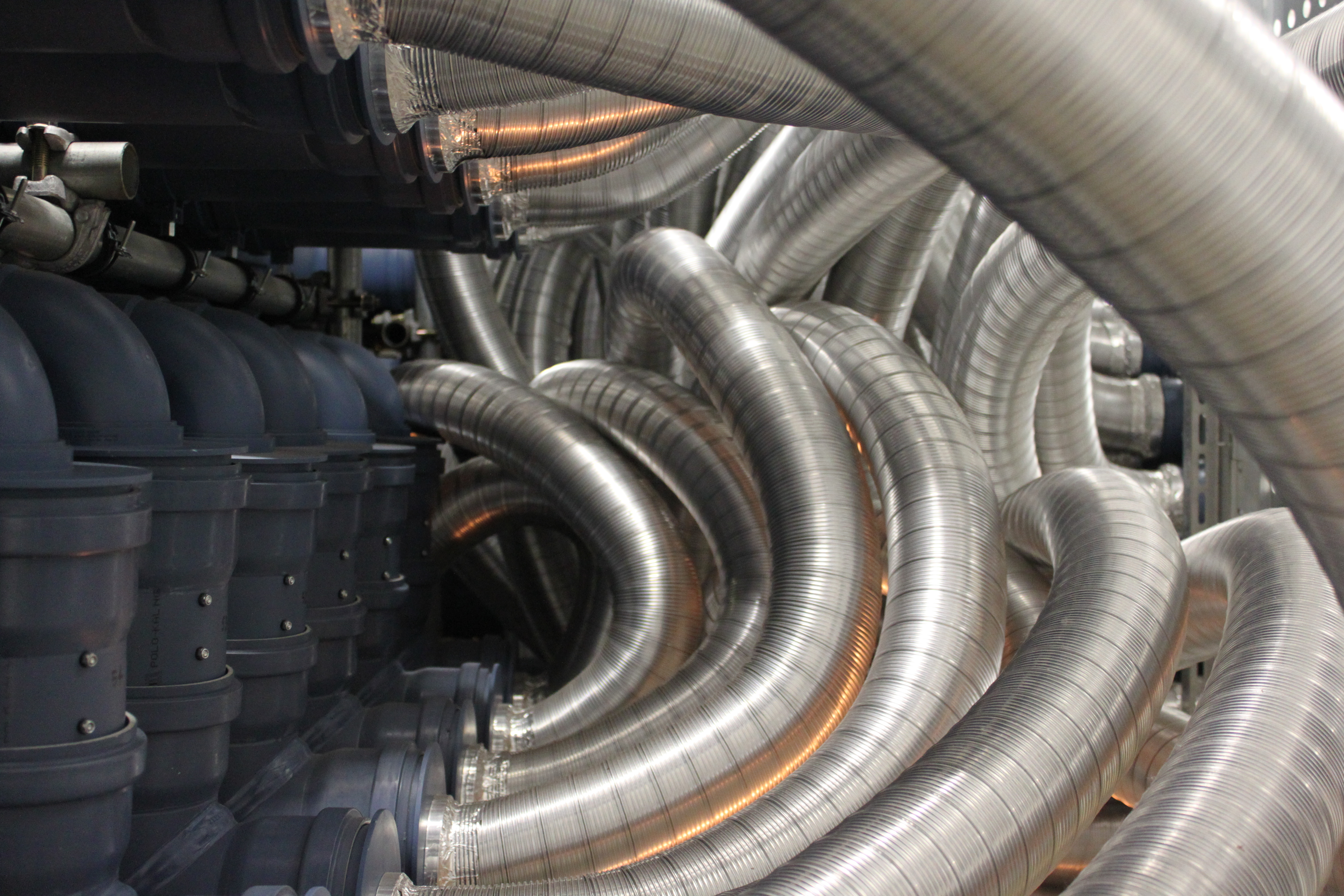
Tubes and chambers of the Smeller 2.0

== Scent Movies ==
- NO(I)SE 1 (2013; Wolfgang Georgsdorf; scent and sound synchronized with image; 24 min. First native Scent Film vor Smeller 2.0 as experimental movie vor Expanded Cinema)
- Edgar Reitz’ „Die andere Heimat“ as Osmodrama (2016; Wolfgang Georgsdorf; scent sequences synchronized to the 2013 Edgar Reitz film)
- Omer Fast's „Continuity“ as Osmodrama (2016; Wolfgang Georgsdorf; 40 min.; scent sequences synchronized to the 2012 Omer Fast Documenta 13 piece Continuity)

== Compositions ==
- „Häuserfugen“ (2012; Wolfgang Georgsdorf; 65 min.; Soundscapes and Scentscapes)
- „Eine Kindheit“ (2012; Wolfgang Georgsdorf; 77 min.; Soundscapes and Scentscapes)
- „Miniaturen“ (2012; Wolfgang Georgsdorf; 55 min.; Soundscapes and Scentscapes)
- „Stille Allee“(2012; Wolfgang Georgsdorf; 12 min.; Smell-sequences)
- „Fünf stumme Stücke“ (2012; Wolfgang Georgsdorf; 21 min.; Smell-sequences)
- Autocomplete (2016; Wolfgang Georgsdorf; 54 min.; Smell-sequences)
- Scenting Phill Niblocks Baobab (2016; Wolfgang Georgsdorf; 27 min.; Smell-sequences as „Scent-Drone“ to Phill Nibblocks minimalistic „Baobab“ of 2013;)
- Orchestral Whifftracks (2016; Wolfgang Georgsdorf; 54 min.; live recorded scent sequences for the W.Georgsdorf conducted live-concert of the Berlin Improvisers Orchestra)
- Neon Lizard (2016; Stephen Crowe / Wolfgang Georgsdorf; 8 min.; Collaboration; Music composition of Stephen Crowe for Violine and Electronics; synchron Smell composition of Wolfgang Georgsdorf; Soloist of the premiere: Aisha Orazbayeva)
- Find Warm Wind Farm (2016; Stephen Crowe / Wolfgang Georgsdorf; 18 min.; Collaboration; Music composition of Stephen Crowe for Clarinet and French horn; synchronous smell composition of Wolfgang Georgsdorf; Musicians at the premiere: Tom Jackson and Samuel Stoll; smell sequences)
- „Osmodrama Versetzter Stein“ (2016; Wolfgang Georgsdorf / Nikola Madzirov; 30 min.; Live Osmdodrama as olfaktive Prologue und Epilogue of Wolfgang Georgsdorf on the Scent organ Smeller 2.0; Nikola Madzirovs read several poems of his children's novel „Geel Gras“, read by the author)
- „Osmodrama Elefantinas Moskauer Jahre“ (2016; Wolfgang Georgsdorf / Julia Kissina; 30 min.; Recorded live osmdodrama synchronized by Wolfgang Georgsdorf on the scent organ Smeller 2.0 to read a chapter of Julia Kissina's novel "Elefantinas Moskauer Jahre", read by the author)
- „Osmodrama Geel Gras“ (2016; Wolfgang Georgsdorf / Simon van der Geest; 30 min.; Recorded live Osmdodrama scene synchronous by Wolfgang Georgsdorf on the scent organ Smeller 2.0 to read several chapters of Simon van der Geest's children's novel "Geel Gras", read by the author)
- „Scentscapes and Soundscapes 1“ (2016; 60 min.; Carl Stone and Wolfgang Georgsdorf; Live concert of Carl Stones Audiocompositions and smell sequences of Wolfgang Georgsdorf on the Smeller 2.0)
- „Scentscapes and Soundscapes 2“ (2016; 45 min.; Sam Auinger and Wolfgang Georgsdorf; Live concert of Sam Auingers Audiocompositionen and smell sequences of Wolfgang Georgsdorf on the Smeller 2.0)

== Neologisms ==
During the emerging practice of Osmodrama, Wolfgang Georgsdorf and his collaborators were obliged to invent terms to describe unprecedented techno-olfactory phenomena:

- Osmodrama: Narrative, time-based, olfactive art form
- Synosmy: longer compositions of smells; designed, structured sequence of olfactive signals
- Smellodies: short sequences or cadences of olfactive signals that make up synosmies
- Whiffmouth: the rosette-shaped ‘mouth’ of the flow guide from Smeller
- Kinetosmy: a changing and moving smell
- Odience: the audience of an Osmodrama performance (in its olfactory dimension)

== Bibliography ==
- Klaus Lüber: The Beginning of a New Paradigm – Wolfgang Georgsdorf interviewed by Klaus Lüber, in ZAPACH: Scent – An Invisible Code, Copernicus Science Centre, 2013/14, ISBN 978-83-919263-4-5, p. 118–125.
- Schmidt, Karlheinz: Der Olfaktorius der Kunst. Karlheinz Schmidt über ein vernachlässigtes Phänomen, in: KUNSTZEITUNG., März 2014, p. 19.
- Egger, Andreas: Kunstparcour der Sinne. Sinnesrausch im OÖ Kulturquartier in Linz, in: kunst:art, Juli 2012, p. 3.
- Düfte auf Knopfdruck in Süddeutsche Zeitung vom 24. Dezember 2014, p. 23 ff.
- So riecht die Zukunft in "So klug sind unsere Sinne" (title story, p. 20 – p. 30) in ZEIT WISSEN, 2016/2, (p. 28. – p. 30).
- Weihser, Rabea in ZEIT ONLINE: Die Wahnsinnlichkeitsmaschine
- Pirich, Caroline in Süddeutsche Zeitung: Das Drama Aroma.
- Danicke, Sandra in ART Magazin: Kunst aus dem Off, September 2016, p. 17.
- Über das Riechen in: Gottfried Hattinger, OÖ Landesmuseum (Hrsg.): Über die Sinne. Bibliothek der Provinz, 2006, ISBN 978-3-85252-731-4, p. 63.
- Bartels, Gunda in Der Tagesspiegel on the 16. August 2016: Hauch mal, Hauchmaul
- Review on Osmdodrama by Sam Johnstone in: THE CUSP
- John Laurenson, Smells -- coming soon to a theater near you?, article in Marketplace
