= Translational drift =

Translational drift also known as melty brain or tornado drive is a form of locomotion, notably found in certain combat robots.

== Principle ==
The principle is applied to spinning robots, where the driving wheels are normally on for the whole revolution, resulting in an increased rotational energy, which is stored for destructive effect, but, given perfect symmetry, no net translational acceleration.

The drive works by modulating the power to the wheel or wheels that spin the robot. The net application of force in one direction results in acceleration in the plane – it can't really be characterised as "forward", "backward" and so forth, as the whole robot is spinning. However, in a standard configuration an accelerometer is used to determine the speed of rotation, and a light emitting diode is turned on once per revolution, to give a nominal forward direction indicator to the operator. The internal controls implement the commands received from the remote control to modulate the drive to the wheels, typically by turning it off for part of a revolution to move in a specific direction.

The benefits of using translational drift include less weight needing to be allocated to a weapon due to it being part of the drive system. Disadvantages include the complexity of design, cost, and reliance on the drive system.

== History ==
In the past, a robot would be classified as a "Sit-and-spin" robot, and would depend on the opponent to engage it to cause damage. As this was deemed less aggressive (which is a common judging criteria) than what could be done by robots armed with a spinning shell mounted on top of their drive, it waned in popularity in most competitions.

The first robot to attempt to use this technology was Blade Runner, a middleweight robot built by Ilya Polyakov for the first five seasons of Comedy Central's Battlebots. Unfortunately, the technology never worked as planned. A lightweight two-wheel drive hammer robot, Herr Gepoünden, implemented the design in their final season of Battlebots. The first symmetrical robot, with a similar in design to a contemporary full-body spinner, to use this technology successfully was CycloneBot, which competed at Steel Conflict 4. The most successful heavyweight competitor, Nuts, relied entirely on translational drift for its weaponry en route to its 3rd place finish in the 10th series of Robot Wars.

== Open Melt ==
Open Melt is an open source implementation of melty brain, the code being licensed under Creative Commons Attribution-Noncommercial-Share Alike licence.

== Rules across competitions ==
Different rules exist for each competition, some of which allow robots that use translational drift to compete. In Battlebots, the use of translational drift does not count towards the active weapon requirement for the primary weapon, as translational drive relies on the entire robot's movement. Conversely, in Robot Wars, there is no such prohibition against using translational drift as a primary, active weapon.
