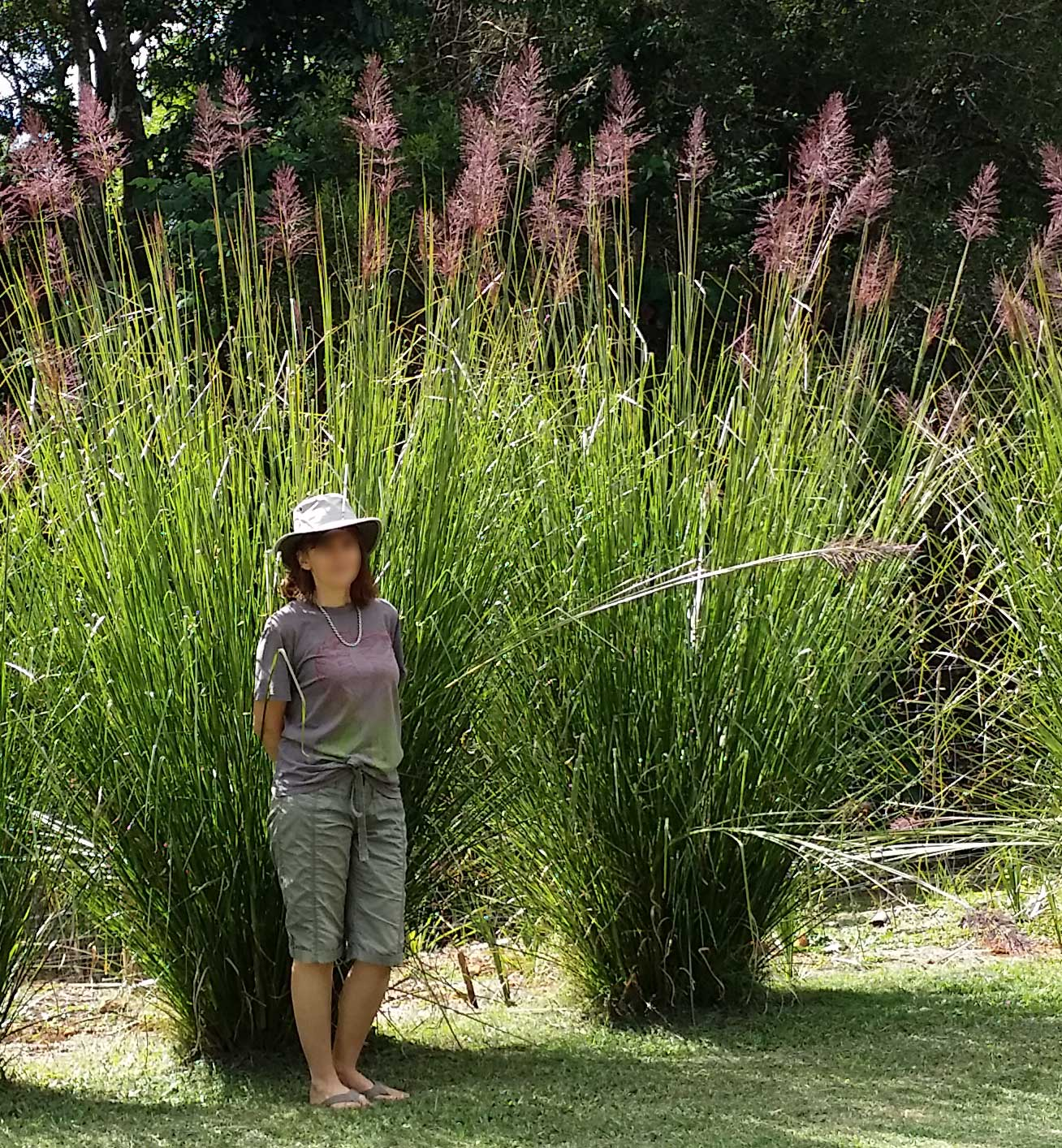

Scientific classification
- Kingdom: Plantae
- Clade: Tracheophytes
- Clade: Angiosperms
- Clade: Monocots
- Clade: Commelinids
- Order: Poales
- Family: Poaceae
- Subfamily: Panicoideae
- Genus: Chrysopogon
- Species: C. zizanioides

Binomial name
- Chrysopogon zizanioides (L.) Roberty

Synonyms
- List: Agrostis verticillata Lam. nom. illeg.; Anatherum muricatum (Retz.) P.Beauv.; Anatherum zizanioides (L.) Hitchc. & Chase; Andropogon aromaticus Roxb. ex Schult. nom. inval.; Andropogon muricatum Retz. [Spelling variant]; Andropogon muricatus Retz.; Andropogon nardus Blanco nom. illeg.; Andropogon odoratus Steud. nom. inval.; Andropogon zizanioides (L.) Urb.; Chamaeraphis muricata (Retz.) Merr.; Holcus zizanioides (L.) Stuck.; Oplismenus abortivus Roem. & Schult. nom. inval.; Phalaris zizanioides L.; Rhaphis muricata (Retz.) Steud. nom. inval.; Rhaphis zizanioides (L.) Roberty; Sorghum zizanioides (L.) Kuntze; Vetiveria arundinacea Griseb.; Vetiveria muricata (Retz.) Griseb.; Vetiveria odorata Virey; Vetiveria odoratissima Lem.-Lis.; Vetiveria zizanioides (L.) Nash

= Chrysopogon zizanioides =

Species of plant

Chrysopogon zizanioides, commonly known as vetiver and khus, is a perennial bunchgrass of the family Poaceae.

Vetiver is most closely related to sorghum while sharing many morphological characteristics with other fragrant grasses, such as lemongrass (Cymbopogon citratus), citronella (Cymbopogon nardus, C. winterianus), and palmarosa (Cymbopogon martinii).

== Etymology ==
Vetiver is derived from the Tamil வெட்டிவேர் (veṭṭivēr) meaning 'root that is dug up', via French vétyver. In Northern India it is also called khus ('grass', not to be confused with khus khus, which refers to poppy seed).

== History ==
During the reign of Harshavardhan, Kannauj became the biggest centre for aromatic trade and for the first time, a vetiver tax was introduced.

Starting in 1990, the World Bank promoted use of vetiver grass by farmers for soil and water management in countries like India, Nepal, Thailand, and Nigeria.

== Description ==
Vetiver grows to 150 centimetres (5 ft) high and forms clumps as wide, and under favorable conditions, the erect culms can reach 3 m (9.8 ft) in height. The stems are tall and the leaves are long, thin, and rather rigid. The flowers are brownish-purple. Unlike most grasses, which form horizontally, spreading mat-like root systems, vetiver's roots grow downward 2–4 m (7–13 ft) in depth.

The vetiver bunch grass has a gregarious habit and grows in tufts. Shoots growing from the underground crown make the plant frost and wildfire resistant, and allow it to survive heavy grazing pressure. The leaves can become up to 300 cm (10 ft) long and 8 mm (3/8 in) wide. The panicles are 15–30 cm (6–12 in) long and have whorled, 25–50 mm (1–2 in) long branches. The spikelets are in pairs, and there are three stamens.

The plant stems are erect and stiff. They can survive deep water flow. Under clear water, the plant can survive up to two months.

The root system of vetiver is finely structured and very strong. It can grow 3–4 m (10–13 ft) deep within the first year. Vetiver has neither stolons nor rhizomes. Because of all these characteristics, the vetiver plant is highly drought-tolerant and can help to protect soil against sheet erosion. In case of sediment deposition, new roots can grow out of buried nodes.

== Cultivation ==
Originally from India, C. zizanioides is widely cultivated in tropical regions. The major vetiver producers include Haiti, India, Indonesia, and Réunion (part of the Mascarene Islands, east of Madagascar).

The most commonly used commercial genotypes of vetiver are sterile, and because vetiver propagates itself by small offsets instead of underground stolons, these genotypes are noninvasive and can easily be controlled by cultivation of the soil at the boundary of the hedge. However, care must be taken, because fertile genotypes of vetiver have become invasive.

Almost all vetiver grown worldwide is vegetatively propagated; bioengineering has shown them as essentially the same nonfertile cultigen by DNA profiling. In the United States the cultivar is named 'Sunshine,' after the town of Sunshine, Louisiana.

== Uses ==
Vetiver grass is grown for many purposes. The plant helps to stabilise soil and protects it against erosion, but it can also protect fields against pests and weeds. Vetiver has favourable qualities for animal feed. From the roots, oil is extracted and used for cosmetics, aromatherapy, herbal skincare and ayurvedic soap. Its fibrous properties make it useful for handicrafts, ropes and more.

=== Skin care ===
Vetiver has been used to produce perfumes, creams and soaps. It is used for its antiseptic properties to treat acne and sores.

=== Soil and water conservation ===
==== Erosion control ====
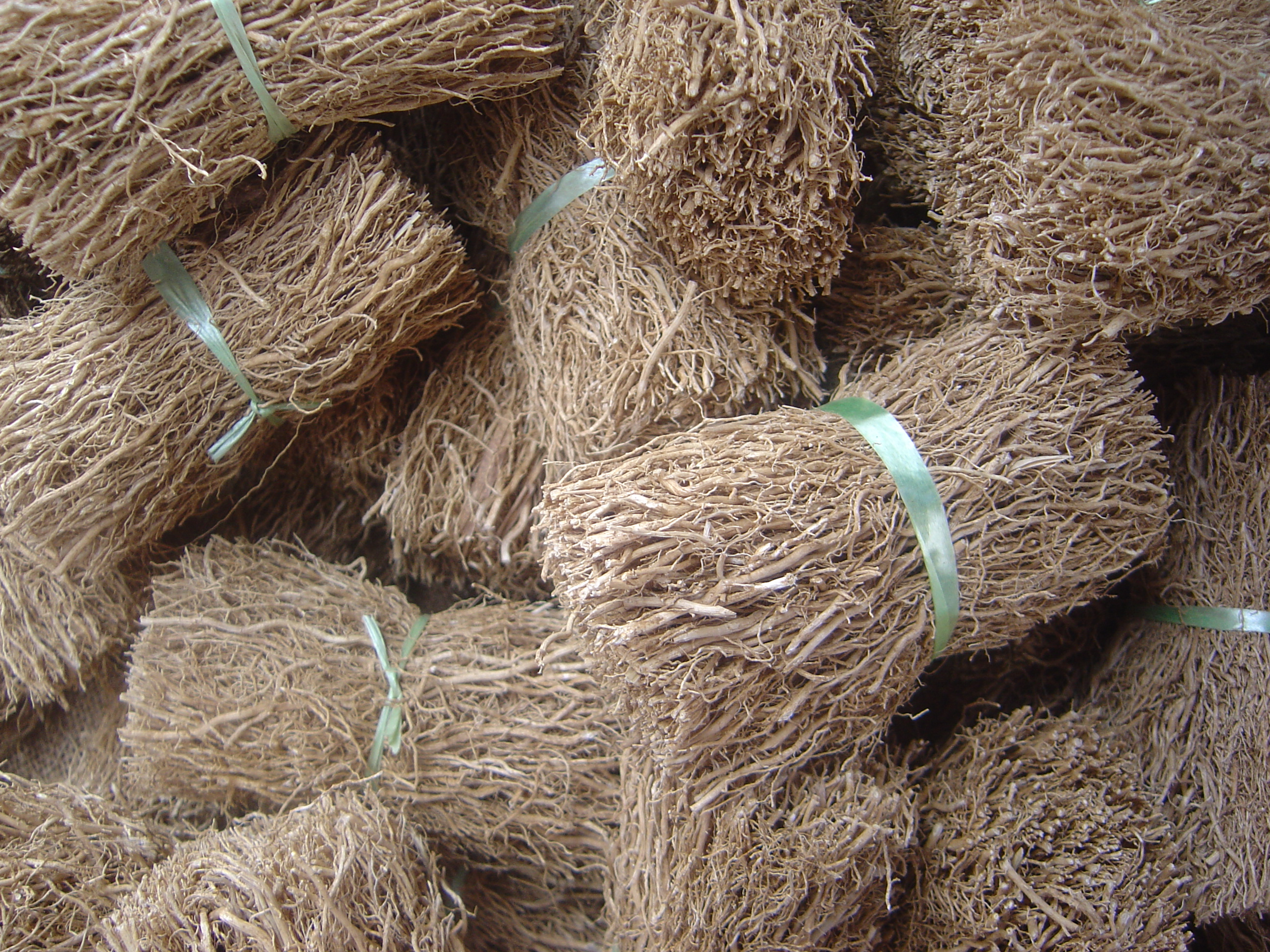
Vetiver roots for sale

Several aspects of vetiver make it an excellent erosion control plant in warmer climates. Vetiver's roots grow almost exclusively downward, 2–4 m (7–13 ft), which is deeper than some tree roots. This makes vetiver an excellent stabilizing hedge for stream banks, terraces and rice paddies, and protects soil from sheet erosion. The roots bind to the soil, therefore the latter can not dislodge. Vetiver has been used to stabilize railway cuttings/embankments in geologically challenging situations in an attempt to prevent mudslides and rockfalls, such as the Konkan railway in western India. The plant also penetrates and loosens compacted soils. Vetiver was advocated for erosion control in Thailand by the late King Bhumibol.

The Vetiver System, a technology of soil conservation and water quality management, is based on the use of the vetiver plant.

==== Runoff mitigation and water conservation ====
The close-growing culms help to block surface water runoff . It slows the water flow and increases the amount absorbed by the soil (infiltration). It can withstand water velocity up to 5 metres per second (16 ft/s).

Vetiver mulch increases water infiltration and reduces evaporation, thus protecting soil moisture under hot and dry conditions. The mulch also protects against splash erosion.

In West African regions, such as Mali and Senegal, vetiver roots were traditionally used to reduce bacteria proliferation in water jugs and jars. In Indonesia, the roots of vetiver are widely used in the production of fragrant mats. In the Philippines and India, the roots are woven to make fragrant-smelling fans called "sandal root fans".

=== Crop protection and pest repellent ===
Vetiver can be used for crop protection. It attracts the stem borer (Chilo partellus), which lays its eggs preferentially on vetiver but whose larvae cannot thrive there, as the plant's hairiness prevents their moving onto the leaves, so that they instead fall to the ground and die.

Vetiver's essential oil has anti-fungal properties against Rhizoctonia solani.

As a mulch, vetiver is used for weed control in coffee, cocoa and tea plantations. It builds a barrier in the form of a thick mat. When the mulch breaks down, soil organic matter is built up and additional crop nutrients become available.

==== Vetiver as a termite repellent ====
Vetiver extracts can repel termites. However, vetiver grass alone, unlike its extracts, cannot be used to repel termites. Unless the roots are damaged, the anti-termite chemicals, such as nootkatone, are not released.

=== Animal feed ===
The leaves of vetiver are a useful byproduct to feed cattle, goats, sheep and horses. The nutritional content depends on season, growth stage and soil fertility. Under most climates, nutritional values and yields are best if vetiver is cut every 1–3 months.

	Young vetiver	Mature vetiver	Old vetiver
Energy [kcal/kg]	522	706	969
Digestibility [%]	51	50	-
Protein [%]	13.1	7.93	6.66
Fat [%]	3.05	1.30	1.40

=== Food and flavorings ===
Vetiver (khus) is also used as a flavoring agent, usually as khus syrup. Khus syrup is made by adding khus essence to sugar, water and citric acid syrup. Khus essence is a dark green thick syrup made from the roots. It has a woody taste and a scent characteristic of khus.

The syrup is used to flavor milkshakes and yogurt drinks like lassi, but can also be used in ice creams, in mixed beverages such as Shirley Temples, and as a dessert topping. Khus syrup does not need to be refrigerated, although khus flavored products may need to be.

=== Perfumery and aromatherapy ===
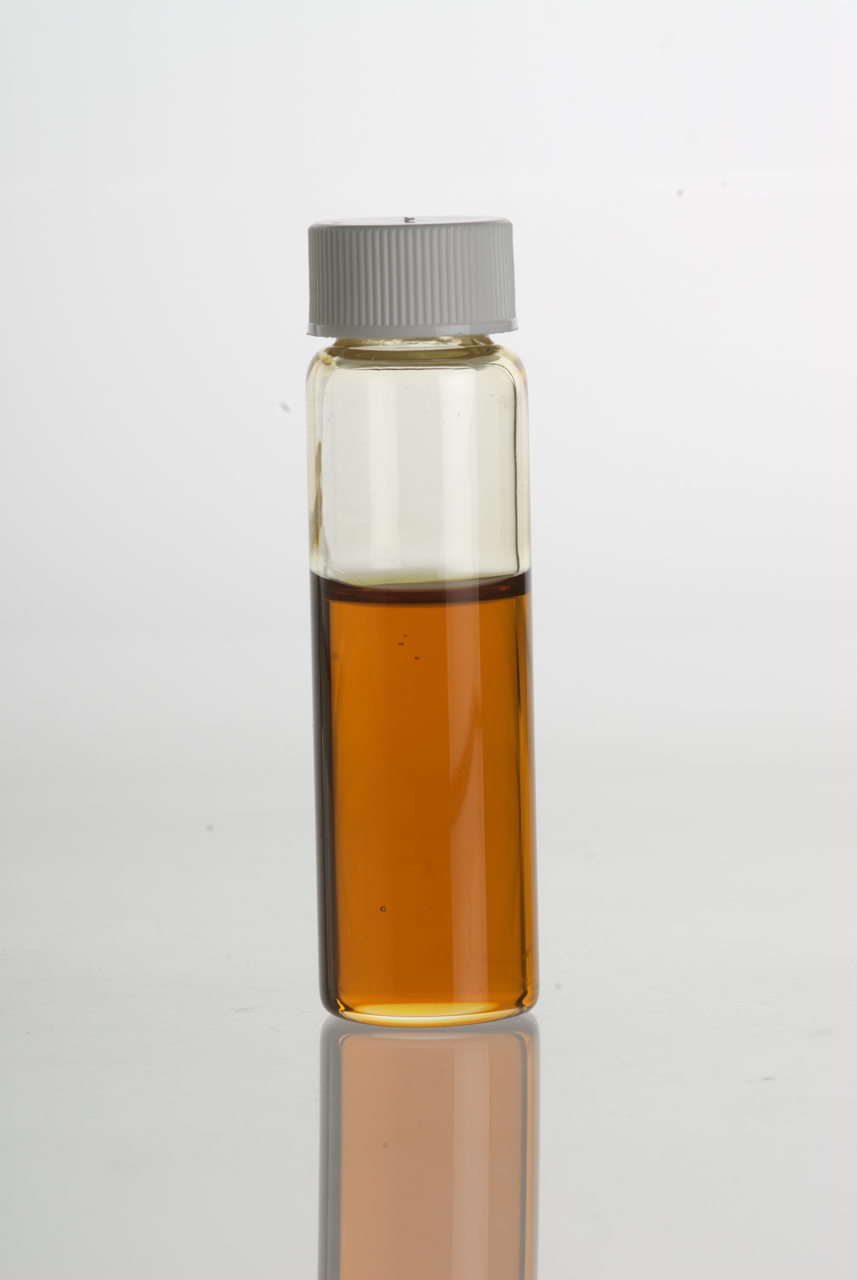
Vetiver (Vetiveria zizanioides= Chrysopogon zizanioides) essential oil in a clear glass vial

Vetiver is mainly cultivated for the fragrant essential oil distilled from its roots. In Cuddalore, farmers grow 400 hectares (1,000 acres) of vetiver for oil extraction with help of marudhamalai groups. In perfumery, the older French spelling, vetyver, is often used. Worldwide production is estimated at about 250 tonnes per annum. Vetiver is used widely in perfumes for its excellent fixative properties. It is contained in 90% of Western perfumes. Vetiver is a more common ingredient in fragrances for men; some notable examples include Dior's Eau Sauvage, Guerlain Vétiver, M. Vétiver by Une Nuit à Bali, Zizan by Ormonde Jayne, Vétiver by L'Occitane en Provence, Encre Noire by Lalique, and Vetiver Root by Korres.

Indonesia, China, and Haiti are major producers. Vetiver processing was introduced to Haiti in the 1940s by Frenchman Lucien Ganot. In 1958, Franck Léger established a plant on the grounds of his father Demetrius Léger's alcohol distillery. The plant was taken over in 1984 by Franck's son, Pierre Léger, who expanded the size of the plant to 44 atmospheric stills, each built to handle one metric ton of vetiver roots. Total production increased in ten years from 20 to 60 tonnes annually, making it the largest producer in the world. The plant extracts vetiver oil by steam distillation. Another major operation in the field is the one owned by the Boucard family. Réunion is considered to produce the highest quality vetiver oil, called "bourbon vetiver", with the next favorable being Haiti and then Java.

The United States, Europe, India, and Japan are the main consumers.

==== Essential oil ====
===== Composition =====
Vetiver oil, or khus oil, is a complex oil, containing over 150 identified components, typically including benzoic acid, furfurol, vetivene, vetivenyl vetivenate, terpinen-4-ol, 5-epiprezizane, khusimene, α-muurolene, khusimone, Calacorene, β-humulene, α-longipinene, γ-selinene, δ-selinene, δ-cadinene, valencene, calarene,-gurjunene, α-amorphene, epizizanal, 3-epizizanol, khusimol, Iso-khusimol, valerenol, β-vetivone, α-vetivone, and vetivazulene.

Structure of α-vetivone, the main fragrant component of the oil of vetiver

Structure of khusimol, another fragrant component of the oil of vetiver

Structure of β-vetivone, another fragrant component of the oil of vetiver

The oil is amber brown and viscous. Its odor is described as deep, sweet, woody, smoky, earthy, amber and balsam. The best quality oil is obtained from 18- to 24-month-old roots. The roots are dug up, cleaned, and then dried. Before distillation, the roots are chopped and soaked in water. The distillation process can take up to 24 hours. After the distillate separates into the essential oil and hydrosol, the oil is skimmed off and allowed to age for a few months to allow some undesirable notes formed during distillation to dissipate. Like patchouli and sandalwood essential oils, vetiver's odor develops and improves with aging. The oil's characteristics can vary significantly depending on where the grass is grown and the climate and soil conditions. The oil distilled in Haiti and Réunion has a more floral quality and is considered of higher quality than the smokier oil from Java. In north India, oil is distilled from wild-growing vetiver. This oil is known as khus or khas, and in India is considered superior to the oil obtained from the cultivated variety. It is rarely found in commerce outside of India, as most of it is consumed within the country.

=== Medicine ===
Vetiver has been used in traditional medicine in South Asia (India, Pakistan, Sri Lanka), Southeast Asia (Malaysia, Indonesia, Thailand), and West Africa.

Old Tamil literature mentions the use of vetiver for medical purposes.

=== In-house ===
In the Indian Subcontinent, khus (vetiver roots) is often used to replace the straw or wood shaving pads in evaporative coolers. When cool water runs for months over wood shavings in evaporative cooler padding, they tend to accumulate algae, bacteria and other microorganisms. This causes the cooler to emit a fishy or seaweed smell. Vetiver root padding counteracts this odor. A cheaper alternative is to add vetiver cooler perfume or even pure khus attar to the tank. Another advantage is that vetiver padding does not catch fire as easily as dry wood shavings.

Mats made by weaving vetiver roots and binding them with ropes or cords are used in India to cool rooms in a house during summer. The mats are typically hung in a doorway and kept moist by spraying with water periodically; they cool the passing air, as well as emitting a fresh aroma.

In the hot summer months in India, sometimes a muslin sachet of vetiver roots is tossed into the earthen pot that keeps a household's drinking water cool. Like a bouquet garni, the bundle lends distinctive flavor and aroma to the water. Khus-scented syrups are also sold.

=== Other uses ===
Vetiver grass is used as roof thatch (it lasts longer than other materials) and in mud brick-making for housing construction (such bricks have lower thermal conductivity). It is also made into strings and ropes, and grown as an ornamental plant (for the light purple flowers).

Garlands made of vetiver grass are used to adorn the murti of Lord Nataraja (Shiva) in Hindu temples. It is a favourite offering to Ganesha.

Vetiver oil has been used in an effort to track where mosquitoes live during dry seasons in Sub-Saharan Africa. Mosquitoes were tagged with strings soaked in vetiver oil then released. Dogs trained to track the scent, not native to Africa, found the marked mosquitoes in such places as holes in trees and in old termite mounds.

== Agricultural aspects ==
=== Environmental requirements ===
Factor	Requirements
Soil type	Sandy loam soils are preferred. Clay loam is acceptable, but clay is not.
Topography	Slightly sloping land avoids waterlogging in case of overwatering. A flat site is acceptable, but watering must be monitored to avoid waterlogging, which stunts the growth of young plants. Mature vetiver, however, thrives under waterlogged conditions.
Nutrition	It absorbs dissolved nutrients, such as nitrogen and phosphorus, and is tolerant to sodicity, magnesium, aluminium and manganese.
pH	Accepts soil pH from 3.3 to 12.5 (?? Implausible. 12.5 is the pH of bleach) (in another publication, 4.3–8.0)
Soil conditions	Tolerant to salinity
Light	Shading affects vetiver growth (C4 plant), but partial shading is acceptable.
Temperature	It is tolerant to temperatures from 15 to 55 °C (59 to 131 °F), depending on growing region. The optimal soil temperature for root growth is 25 °C (77 °F). Root dormancy occurs under a temperature of 5 °C (41 °F). Shoot growth is affected earlier; at 13 °C (55 °F), shoot growth is minimal, but root growth is continued at a rate of 12.6 cm (4 15/16 in) per day. Under frosty conditions, shoots become dormant and purple, or even die, but the underground growing points survive and can regrow quickly if conditions improve.
Water	It is tolerant to drought (because of its deep roots), flood, and submergence; annual precipitation of 64–410 cm (25–161 in) is tolerated, but it has to be at least 22.5 cm (8.9 in).

=== Crop management ===
Vetiver is planted in long, straight rows across the slope for easy mechanical harvesting. The soil should be wet. Trenches are 15–20 cm (6–8 in) deep. A modified seedling planter or mechanical transplanter can plant large numbers of vetiver slips in the nursery. Flowering and nonflowering varieties are used for cultivation. Sandy loam nursery beds ensure easy harvest and minimal damage to plant crowns and roots. Open space is recommended, because shading slows growth.

Overhead irrigation is recommended for the first few months after planting. More mature plants prefer flood irrigation. Weed control may be needed during establishment phase, by using atrazine after planting.

To control termites that attack dead material, hexachlorobenzene, also known as benzene hexachloride-BCH, can be applied to the vetiver hedge. Brown spot seems to have no effect on vetiver growth. Black rust in India is vetiver-specific and does not cross-infect other plants. In China, stemborers (Chilo spp.) have been recognised, but they seem to die once they get into the stems. Further, vetiver is affected by Didymella andropogonis on leaves, Didymosphaeria andropogonis on dead culms, Lulworthia medusa on culms and Ophiosphaerella herpotricha. Only in Malaysia, whiteflies seem to be a problem. Pest management is done by using insecticides and by appropriate cultural management: hedges are cut to 3 cm above ground at the end of the growing season. In general, vetiver is tolerant to herbicides and pesticides.

Harvest of mature plants is performed mechanically or manually. A machine uproots the mature stock 20–25 cm (8–10 in) below ground. To avoid damaging the plant crown, a single-blade mouldboard plough or a disc plough with special adjustment is used.

== General and cited references ==
- E. Guenther, The Essential Oils Vol. 4 (New York: Van Nostrand Company INC, 1990), 178–181, cited in Salvatore Battaglia, The Complete Guide to Aromatherapy (Australia: The Perfect Potion, 1997), 205.
- Other Uses and Utilization of Vetiver: Vetiver Oil - U.C. Lavania - Central Institute of Medicinal and Aromatic Plants, Lucknow-336 015, India
- Veldkamp, J. F. (1999). "A revision of Chrysopogon Trin., including Vetiveria Bory (Poaceae) in Thailand and Malesia with notes on some other species from Africa and Australia". Austrobaileya. 5: 522–523.
