= Vetiver System =

System of soil and water conservation

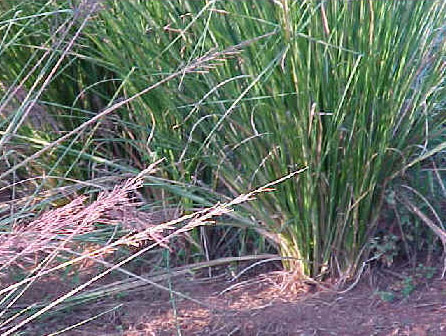
Chrysopogon zizanioides, commonly known as vetiver and khus.

The Vetiver System (VS) is a system of soil and water conservation whose main component is the use of the vetiver plant in hedgerows. It is promoted by the Vetiver Network International (TVNI), an international non-governmental organization.

The Vetiver System is used in more than 100 countries for soil and water conservation, infrastructure stabilization, pollution control, waste water treatment, mitigation and rehabilitation, sediment control, prevention of storm damage and other environmental protection applications (through bioengineering and phytoremediation).

== Utility ==
The vetiver plant, Chrysopogon zizanioides, is the main component to all Vetiver System bioengineering and conservation applications. It can be used in the tropics and semi-tropics, and areas that have a Mediterranean climate where there are hot summers, and winters are temperate.

When Vetiver is planted as a hedgerow across a slope, it forms a dense vegetative barrier that slows and spreads rainfall runoff. Combined with a deep and strong root system, a wide range of pH tolerance (from about pH 3 to pH 11), a high tolerance to most heavy metals, an ability to remove from soil and water large quantities of nitrates, phosphates and farm chemicals, the vetiver plant can be used for soil and water conservation, engineered construction site stabilization, pollution control (constructed wetlands), and other uses where soil and water come together.

The variety of vetiver that is promoted for VS applications originates in south India, is non-fertile and non-invasive, and has to be propagated by clump subdivision. Its massive, finely structured root system can grow fast - in some applications, rooting depth can reach 10–12 ft (3–4 m) in the first year. This deep root system makes the vetiver plant drought-tolerant and difficult to dislodge by strong current. It has stiff and erect stems, which can stand up to relatively deep water flow. New shoots develop from the underground crown, making vetiver resistant to fire, frosts, traffic and heavy grazing pressure. Vetiver grass is not significantly affected by pests and diseases, nor does it act as a host for pests or diseases that might attack crop or garden plants.

== Technique ==
The basic technique of soil stabilization using vetiver consists of one or more hedgerows planted on the contour. Nursery plants or slips (clumps) of about 3 tillers each, are typically planted 4-6 inches (10 – 15 cm) apart on the contour to create, when mature, a barrier of stiff grass that acts as a buffer and spreader of down slope water flow, and a filter to sediment. The development of strong plants and a deep root system requires full sun. Partial shading stunts its growth, and significant shading can eliminate it in the long term by reducing its ability to compete with more shade-tolerant species.

Multiple hedgerows may be required for a secure slope stabilization, in which case the separation between rows depends on the slope, soil condition and composition, and the severity of the problem. Typical distances range between three and six feet. Some published guidelines recommend a distance between rows of about 5.7 ft. (1.7 m) for a 30° slope, and about 3 ft. (1 m) for a 45° slope.

== Impact ==
A good hedge reduces rainfall runoff by as much as 70% and sediment by as much as 90%. A hedgerow stays where it is planted and the sediment that is spread out behind the hedgerow gradually accumulates to form a long-lasting terrace. It is a low-cost, labor-intensive technology claimed to have a high benefit/cost ratio. When used for civil works protection, its cost is claimed to be about 1/20 of traditional engineered systems and designs.

The variety of vetiver used in the Vetiver System does not have stolons or rhizomes and does not produce fertile seed. In some countries vetiver has been used to define property lines.

The Vetiver System is a developing technology. As a soil conservation technique and, more recently, a bioengineering tool, the effective application of the Vetiver System in large-scale projects that involve significant engineering design and construction requires an understanding of biology, soil science, hydraulics, hydrology and geotechnical principles.

== The Vetiver Network International ==
The Vetiver Network International (TVNI) is an international NGO, with members in over 100 countries promoting the Vetiver System (VS) for a sustainable environment particularly in relation to land and water. Its active members include people working in government, research institutions, international development agencies, NGOs and the private sector and farming communities.
