= Mouse ear swelling test =

Toxicological test

The mouse ear swelling test is a toxicological test that aims to mimic human skin reactions to chemicals. It avoids post-mortem examination of tested animals.

== See also ==
- Local lymph node assay
- Draize test
- Freund's Complete Adjuvant
