= Ormonde Jayne =

British perfume house

- Named after: Founder Linda Pilkinton's middle name and the address of a former home.
- Formation: 2000; 26 years ago
- Founder: Linda Pilkington
- Founded at: Mayfair, London
- Location: London, England, United Kingdom
- Products: Perfumes, candles, bath and body products
- Revenue: £5.1 million (2018)
- Website: ormondejayne.com

Ormonde Jayne is a London-based niche perfume house founded by Linda Pilkington in 2000. Begun as a line of scented candles, the house now makes perfumes as well. The perfumes are created by Pilkington and Geza Schoen.

== Background and founding ==
Ormonde Jayne founder Linda Pilkington grew up in a village in Cheshire, England, where she and her sisters often made beeswax candles, selling them to neighbors. She later lived in Brazil and Argentina, where she became an ice cream vendor, before moving to London in 1992.

Her first commission came from a friend who knew of her fondness for making candles and asked her to create a set for the launch of his Chanel fine jewellery boutique. Thinking she might like to pursue the enterprise further, Pilkington invested £1000 in the business and next went to France to study candle-making. The brand grew rapidly, eventually exceeding Pilkington's capacity to keep up with demand. In 2001 she left the wholesale market and opened her own retail shop instead. She began web sales in 2002, accommodating international customers.

The brand's name derives from Pilkington's middle name and the address of a former family home. The business is wholly owned by Pilkington and her husband, a banker.

== Products ==
Ormonde Jayne has since grown from candles to include perfumes, other home scents like reed diffusers, and bath and body products, though the bath and body products were later discontinued. Perfumer Geza Schoen has worked with Pilkington on perfumes for the line. Reviewing the line in 2009, New York Times perfume critic Chandler Burr wrote, "The Ormonde Jayne collection has managed to bottle mesmerizing strangeness that stays, just barely at times, this side of unwearable art scents."

In Luca Turin and Tania Sanchez’s Perfumes: The Guide, the line’s titular fragrances Ormonde Man and Ormonde Woman both received five-star reviews. Both fragrances are based on hemlock; Ormonde Man also has notes of juniper berries and oud. Turin and Sanchez also included the pair in their book of 100 “classics” in perfumery.

Other notable Ormonde Jayne fragrances include Orris Noir, based on purple-black iris, pink pepper and pimento berries; Champaca, an orange wildflower from India mixed with green tea, basmati rice and myrrh; Sampaquita, named after a species of jasmine that is also the national flower of the Philippines; Ta’if, a rose and saffron fragrance named for the city in Saudi Arabia where the rose ingredient is grown; Tolu, a resin mixed with rose; Vanille d’Iris, vanilla and iris as well as carrot seed, coriander seed, bergamot and musk; Montabaco, with orange absolute, tobacco and leather; and Nawab of Oudh, a blend of ambers, oud and musk.

Pilkington also develops Ormonde Jayne fragrances for individual clients, in a six-month process. Pilkington personally oversees every stage of perfume production.

== Expansion ==
Eventually Pilkington decided to expand the business again, in part necessitated by the rising rent at her shop in Mayfair. She signed a deal with Saks Fifth Avenue to sell her fragrances in their New York City store, launching in May 2018. Pilkington estimates 2018 sales at £5.1 million.

== See also ==
- Jo Loves
- Jo Malone London
- Miller Harris
- Penhaligon's
