= Fahrenheit (perfume) =

Perfume by Christian Dior

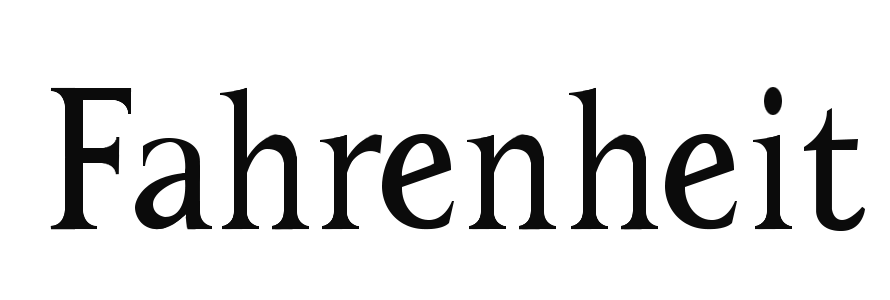

Fragrance by Christian Dior
- Released: 1988
- Label: Parfums Christian Dior
- Tagline: L'homme infiniment
- Website: Fahrenheit

Fahrenheit is a perfume for men produced by Parfums Christian Dior. The fragrance was introduced in 1988. It was created by the perfumers Maurice Roger and Jean-Louis Sieuzac.
