= Smell =

Smell may refer to:

- Odor, airborne molecules perceived as a scent or aroma
- Sense of smell, the scent also known scientifically as olfaction
- "Smells" (Bottom), an episode of Bottom
- The Smell, a music venue in Los Angeles, California
- Code smell, any characteristic of a program that possibly indicates a deeper problem
