= OECD Guidelines for the Testing of Chemicals =

Set of accepted specifications

OECD Guidelines for the Testing of Chemicals (OECD TG) are a set of internationally accepted specifications for the testing of chemicals decided on by the Organisation for Economic Co-operation and Development (OECD). They were first published in 1981. They are split into five sections:

- Section 1: Physical Chemical Properties
- Section 2: Effects on Biotic Systems
- Section 3: Environmental Fate and Behaviour
- Section 4: Health Effects
- Section 5: Other Test Guidelines

Guidelines are numbered with three digit numbers, the section number being the first number. Sometimes guidelines are suffixed with a letter.

Guidelines are under constant review, with guidelines being periodically updated, new guidelines being adopted, and guidelines being withdrawn. Previous guidelines are maintained on the website for reference purposes. Animal welfare concerns are dealt with by ensuring that animal tests are only permitted where necessary. An OECD Directive obligates a national regulator to use TG studies performed in another member country (Mutual Acceptance of Data, ‘MAD’ (enacting the OECD's mission of reducing non-tariff trade barriers), and the OECD reaches out to non-OECD countries to use the TG when those countries regulate chemicals.

Many of the TG for health effects (toxicity tests) function together, in a process called ‘dose-ranging’; lowering doses while extending exposure period. The in vitro effects of a chemical are quickly discovered using a wide range of doses, which sets the doses for acute in vivo tests; next a semi-chronic exposure tests in vertebrates, whose purpose is to find the ‘Maximally Tolerated Dose’ (MTD)–the dose that the animals are likely to tolerate for the duration of the final TG—a chronic test of typically one to two years exposure (to mimic a lifetime of human exposure). The MTD becomes the highest dose in the chronic exposure test, and typically one to three more lower dose levels are added (typically spanning about 20 to 100-fold), often in the ‘mg/kg per day’ range (e.g., 400, 150 & 50 mg/kg d-). See the TG 453 (Combined Chronic Toxicity/Carcinogenicity) for more on dose ranging.

At these high chronic exposure doses, toxicity is likely in some but not all animals, allowing a small, affordable number of animals. The risk assessment is finished by taking the TG's no- or the lowest-effect dose, dividing it by a safety factor (e.g. 100-fold) and comparing that 'safe dose' to the anticipated exposures.

It has been observed that these chronic TG doses are unrealistically high (close to the poisonous doses) for determining effects from our actual exposures–i.e. they do not actually test their hypothesis. Academic researchers in contrast are interested in the hypothesis, ‘what effects from our actual exposures?’, and to date have published at least 20,000 findings of chemicals' toxicity at low doses in vertebrate animals, at the rate of about 3 or 4 every day. The chronic TG have further insensitivities to find toxicity: they sacrifice the animals at the human equivalent of the early sixties of age–before most chronic diseases even manifest. Effects are detected only with visible light microscopes. Finally, they are performed by the party with a huge financial interest in the chemical being shown to be safe enough to market. Nevertheless, regulators, politicians and other stakeholders believe the TG are reliable to determine risks with.

The guidelines are available in both English and French.

== List of guidelines ==
=== Section 1: Physical Chemical Properties ===
Number	Title
101	UV-VIS absorption spectra
102	Melting point/Melting range
103	Boiling point
104	Vapour pressure
105	Water solubility
106	Adsorption – Desorption Using a Batch Equilibrium Method
107	Partition coefficient (n-octanol/water): Shake Flask Method
108	Complex formation ability in water
109	Density of liquids and solids
110	Particle size distribution/ fibre length and diameter distributions
111	Hydrolysis as a function of pH
112	Dissociation constants in water
113	Screening test for thermal stability and stability in air
114	Viscosity of liquids
115	Surface tension of aqueous solutions
116	Fat solubility of solid and liquid substances
117	Partition coefficient (n-octanol/water), HPLC Method
118	Determination of the Number-Average molecular weight and the molecular weight distribution of polymers using Gel Permeation Chromatography
119	Determination of the Low Molecular Weight Content of a Polymer Using Gel Permeation Chromatography
120	Solution/Extraction Behaviour of Polymers in Water
121	Estimation of the adsorption coefficient (K_{OC}) on Soil and on sewage sludge using High Performance Liquid Chromatography (HPLC)
122	Determination of pH, Acidity and Alkalinity
123	Partition coefficient (1-Octanol/Water): Slow-Stirring Method

=== Section 2: Effects on Biotic Systems ===
Number	Title
201	Freshwater Alga and Cyanobacteria, Growth Inhibition Test
202	Daphnia sp. Acute Immobilisation Test
203	Fish, Acute Toxicity Test
204	Fish, Prolonged Toxicity Test: 14-Day Study
205	Avian Dietary Toxicity Test
206	Avian Reproduction Test
207	Earthworm, Acute Toxicity Tests
208	Terrestrial Plant Test: Seedling Emergence and Seedling Growth Test
209	Activated Sludge, Respiration Inhibition Test (Carbon and Ammonium Oxidation)
210	Fish, Early-life Stage Toxicity Test
211	Daphnia magna Reproduction Test
212	Fish, Short-term Toxicity Test on Embryo and Sac-Fry Stages
213	Honeybees, Acute Oral Toxicity Test
214	Honeybees, Acute Contact Toxicity Test
215	Fish, Juvenile Growth Test
216	Soil Microorganisms: Nitrogen Transformation Test
217	Soil Microorganisms: Carbon Transformation Test
218	Sediment-Water Chironomid Toxicity Using Spiked Sediment
219	Sediment-Water Chironomid Toxicity Using Spiked Water
220	Enchytraeid Reproduction Test
221	Lemna sp. Growth Inhibition Test
222	Earthworm Reproduction Test (Eisenia fetida/Eisenia andrei)
223	Avian Acute Oral Toxicity Test
224	Determination of the Inhibition of the Activity of Anaerobic Bacteria
225	Sediment-Water Lumbriculus Toxicity Test Using Spiked Sediment
226	Predatory mite (Hypoaspis (Geolaelaps) aculeifer) reproduction test in soil
227	Terrestrial Plant Test: Vegetative Vigour Test
228	Determination of Developmental Toxicity of a Test Chemical to Dipteran Dung Flies (Scathophaga stercoraria L. (Scathophagidae), Musca autumnalis De Geer (Muscidae))
229	Fish Short Term Reproduction Assay
230	21-day Fish Assay
231	Amphibian Metamorphosis Assay
232	Collembolan Reproduction Test in Soil
233	Sediment-Water Chironomid Life-Cycle Toxicity Test Using Spiked Water or Spiked Sediment
234	Fish Sexual Development Test
235	Chironomus sp., Acute Immobilisation Test
236	Fish Embryo Acute Toxicity (FET) Test
237	Honey Bee (Apis Mellifera) Larval Toxicity Test, Single Exposure
238	Sediment-Free Myriophyllum Spicatum Toxicity Test
239	Water-Sediment Myriophyllum Spicatum Toxicity Test
240	Medaka Extended One Generation Reproduction Test (MEOGRT)
241	The Larval Amphibian Growth and Development Assay (LAGDA)

=== Section 3: Environmental Fate and Behaviour ===
Number	Title
301	Ready Biodegradability
302A	Inherent Biodegradability: Modified SCAS Test
302B	Inherent Biodegradability: Zahn-Wellens/ EVPA Test
302C	Inherent Biodegradability: Modified MITI Test (II)
303	Simulation Test – Aerobic Sewage Treatment – A: Activated Sludge Units; B: Biofilms
304A	Inherent Biodegradability in Soil
305	Bioaccumulation in Fish: Aqueous and Dietary Exposure
306	Biodegradability in Seawater
307	Aerobic and Anaerobic Transformation in Soil
308	Aerobic and Anaerobic Transformation in Aquatic Sediment Systems
309	Aerobic Mineralisation in Surface Water – Simulation Biodegradation Test
310	Ready Biodegradability – CO_{2} in sealed vessels (Headspace Test)
311	Anaerobic Biodegradability of Organic Compounds in Digested Sludge: by Measurement of Gas Production
312	Leaching in Soil Columns
313	Estimation of Emissions from Preservative – Treated Wood to the Environment
314	Simulation Tests to Assess the Biodegradability of Chemicals Discharged in Wastewater
315	Bioaccumulation in Sediment-dwelling Benthic Oligochaetes
316	Phototransformation of Chemicals in Water – Direct Photolysis
317	Bioaccumulation in Terrestrial Oligochaetes

=== Section 4: Health Effects ===
Number	Title
401	Acute Oral Toxicity
402	Acute Dermal Toxicity
403	Acute Inhalation Toxicity
404	Acute Dermal Irritation/Corrosion
405	Acute Eye Irritation/Corrosion
406	Skin Sensitisation
407	Repeated Dose 28-day Oral Toxicity Study in Rodents
408	Repeated Dose 90-Day Oral Toxicity Study in Rodents
409	Repeated Dose 90-Day Oral Toxicity Study in Non-Rodents
410	Repeated Dose Dermal Toxicity: 21/28-day Study
411	Subchronic Dermal Toxicity: 90-day Study
412	Subacute Inhalation Toxicity: 28-Day Study
413	Subchronic Inhalation Toxicity: 90-day Study
414	Prenatal Development Toxicity Study
415	One-Generation Reproduction Toxicity Study
416	Two-Generation Reproduction Toxicity
417	Toxicokinetics
418	Delayed Neurotoxicity of Organophosphorus Substances Following Acute Exposure
419	Delayed Neurotoxicity of Organophosphorus Substances: 28-day Repeated Dose Study
420	Acute Oral Toxicity – Fixed Dose Procedure
421	Reproduction/Developmental Toxicity Screening Test
422	Combined Repeated Dose Toxicity Study with the Reproduction/Developmental Toxicity Screening Test
423	Acute Oral toxicity – Acute Toxic Class Method
424	Neurotoxicity Study in Rodents
425	Acute Oral Toxicity: Up-and-Down Procedure
426	Developmental Neurotoxicity Study
427	Skin Absorption: In Vivo Method
428	Skin Absorption: In Vitro Method
429	Skin Sensitisation
430	In Vitro Skin Corrosion: Transcutaneous Electrical Resistance Test Method (TER)
431	In Vitro Skin Corrosion: Reconstructed Human Epidermis (RHE) Test Method
432	In Vitro 3T3 NRU Phototoxicity Test
435	In Vitro Membrane Barrier Test Method for Skin Corrosion
436	Acute Inhalation Toxicity – Acute Toxic Class Method
437	Bovine Corneal Opacity and Permeability Test Method for Identifying i) Chemicals Inducing Serious Eye Damage and ii) Chemicals Not Requiring Classification for Eye Irritation or Serious Eye Damage
438	Isolated Chicken Eye Test Method for Identifying i) Chemicals Inducing Serious Eye Damage and ii) Chemicals Not Requiring Classification for Eye Irritation or Serious Eye Damage
439	In Vitro Skin Irritation: Reconstructed Human Epidermis Test Method
440	Uterotrophic Bioassay in Rodents
441	Hershberger Bioassay in Rats
442A	Skin Sensitization
442B	Skin Sensitization
442C	In Chemico Skin Sensitisation
442D	In Vitro Skin Sensitisation
443	Extended One-Generation Reproductive Toxicity Study
451	Carcinogenicity Studies
452	Chronic Toxicity Studies
453	Combined Chronic Toxicity/Carcinogenicity Studies
455	Draft Performance-Based Test Guideline for Stably Transfected Transactivation In Vitro Assays to Detect Estrogen Receptor Agonists and Antagonists
456	H295R Steroidogenesis Assay
457	BG1Luc Estrogen Receptor Transactivation Test Method for Identifying Estrogen Receptor Agonists and Antagonists
460	Fluorescein Leakage Test Method for Identifying Ocular Corrosives and Severe Irritants
471	Bacterial Reverse Mutation Test
473	In Vitro Mammalian Chromosomal Aberration Test
474	Mammalian Erythrocyte Micronucleus Test
475	Mammalian Bone Marrow Chromosomal Aberration Test
476	In Vitro Mammalian Cell Gene Mutation Tests using the Hprt and xprt genes
477	Genetic Toxicology: Sex-Linked Recessive Lethal Test in Drosophila melanogaster
478	Rodent Dominant Lethal Test
479	Genetic Toxicology: In vitro Sister Chromatid Exchange Assay in Mammalian Cells
480	Genetic Toxicology: Saccharomyces cerevisiae, Gene Mutation Assay
481	Genetic Toxicology: Saacharomyces cerevisiae, Miotic Recombination Assay
482	Genetic Toxicology: DNA Damage and Repair, Unscheduled DNA Synthesis in Mammalian Cells in vitro
483	Mammalian Spermatogonial Chromosomal Aberration Test
484	Genetic Toxicology: Mouse Spot Test
485	Genetic toxicology, Mouse Heritable Translocation Assay
486	Unscheduled DNA Synthesis (UDS) Test with Mammalian Liver Cells in vivo
487	In Vitro Mammalian Cell Micronucleus Test
488	Transgenic Rodent Somatic and Germ Cell Gene Mutation Assays
489	In Vivo Mammalian Alkaline Comet Assay
490	In Vitro Mammalian Cell Gene Mutation Tests Using the Thymidine Kinase Gene
491	Short Time Exposure In Vitro Test Method for Identifying i) Chemicals Inducing Serious Eye Damage and ii) Chemicals Not Requiring Classification for Eye Irritation or Serious Eye Damage
492	Reconstructed human Cornea-like Epithelium (RhCE) test method for identifying chemicals not requiring classification and labelling for eye irritation or serious eye damage
493	Performance-Based Test Guideline for Human Recombinant Estrogen Receptor (hrER) In Vitro Assays to Detect Chemicals with ER Binding Affinity

=== Section 5: Other Test Guidelines ===
Number	Title
501	Metabolism in Crops
502	Metabolism in Rotational Crops
503	Metabolism in Livestock
504	Residues in Rotational Crops (Limited Field Studies)
505	Residues in Livestock
506	Stability of Pesticide Residues in Stored Commodities
507	Nature of the Pesticide Residues in Processed Commodities – High Temperature Hydrolysis
508	Magnitude of the Pesticide Residues in Processed Commodities
509	Crop Field Trial
