= List of fragrance compounds =

The following is a list providing an overview of fragrance compounds with key information regarding them.

Name	Scent	Natural occurrence	Chemical structure	Chemical compound type
1-Hexanol	herbaceous, woody	Grass		Alcohol
2-Acetyl-1-pyrroline	fresh bread, rice	tiger, Indian leopard		Acetyl
6-Acetyl-2,3,4,5-tetrahydropyridine	fresh bread, tortillas, popcorn	baked goods		Ketone
Cis-3-Hexen-1-ol	fresh cut grass	most plants		Alcohol
Cis-3-Hexenal	green tomatoes	tomatoes		Aldehyde
Amber Xtreme				
Ambermor				
Ambermor Ketal Crystal				
Ambermor Ketal IPM				
Ambermor-Ex				
Ambrinol 95				
Bornafix				
Cashmeran				
Cetalor				
Grisalva				
Operanide				
Trisamber				
Bergamal				
Citral Dimethyl Acetal				
Citrolate				
Clonal				
Dimyrcetol				
Dipentene 5100				
Herbalime				
Hypo-LEM				
Limoxal				
Myrcenol Super				
Myrcenyl Acetate				
Nootkatone Crystals				
Nootkatone Natural Crystals				
Octacetal				
Orange Flower Ether				
Pamplefleur				
Terpinolene 20				
Terpinolene 90				
Terpinolene 90 PQ				
Terpinolene Rectified				
Tetrahydro Myrcenol				
Valencene				
Verbenal				
Anisimea				
Aquaflora				
Auralva				
Citronellol 700				
Citronellol 950				
Citronellyl Propionate				
Cyclemax				
Damascenone 93% Min.				
Damascenone 98% Min.				
Damascol				
Dihydro Terpineol				
Dimethyl Octanol				
Dimethyl Phenyl Ethyl Carbinyl Acetate				
Fleuramone				
Floral Super				
Floralozone				
Gelsone				
Geraniol 600				
Geraniol 7030				
Geraniol 950 SG				
Geraniol 980 Pure				
Geranyl Formate				
Geranyl Propionate				
Helional				
Hyacinth Body				
Hyacinth Body No. 3				
Hydratropic Aldehyde DMA				
Hydroxyol				
Indolene 50% BB				
Jasmal				
Jessemal				
Kharismal				
Kharismal Super				
Lavonax				
Lilianth				
Lindenol				
Lyral				
Lyrame Super				
Meijiff				
Melafleur				
Methyl Lavender Ketone				
Muguesia				
Muguet Ald 50% BB				
Nerol 900				
Peomosa				
Phenafleur				
Phenoxanol				
Phenyl Acetaldehyde Glycerine Acetal				
Phenyl Ethyl Benzoate				
Phenyl Ethyl Phenyl Acetate				
Pseudo Linalyl Acetate				
Reseda Body				
Rosalva				
Rosethyl				
Starfleur				
Terpineol 900				
Terpineol Alpha JAX				
Terpineol AP				
Terpineol Extra				
Terpinol				
Tetrahydro Muguol				
Violiff				
Ylanganate				
Intreleven Aldehyde				
Intreleven Aldehyde Special				
Maritima				
Myrac aldehyde				
Oceanol				
Ozofleur				
Pino Acetaldehyde				
Precyclemone B				
Beta Naphtyl Isobutyl Ether				
Cassiffix				
Citronellyl Acetate				
Citronellyl Formate				
CP Formate Aphermate				
Cuminyl Acetate				
Cyclabute				
Cyclemone A				
Damascone Alpha				
Damascone Beta				
Damascone Delta				
Dulcinyl Recrystallized				
Ethyl Phenyl Glycidate				
Fraistone				
Fructone				
Geranyl acetate A				
Geranyl Acetate Extra				
Geranyl Acetate Pure				
Geranyl Iso Butyrate				
Hexalon				
Hexyl acetate				
Iso Amyl Butyrate				
Nectarate				
Neryl Acetate JAX				
Prenyl Acetate				
Terpinyl Acet Jax				
Terpinyl Acetate				
Terpinyl Acetate Extra				
Tropicalia				
Undecalactone Gamma Coeur				
Vanoris				
Galbascone 95				
Cortex Aldehyde 50% TEC				
Galbascone				
Galbascone High Alpha				
Hexenyl Salicylate CIS-3				
Iso Cyclo Citral				
Liffarome				
Melozone				
Montaverdi				
Syvertal				
Vertoliff				
Vivaldie				
Canthoxal				
Dihydro Cyclacet				
Dihydro Terpinyl Acetate				
Fleuranil				
Herbac				
Ocimene				
Ocimenyl Acetate				
Oxaspirane-819				
Pinane				
Salicynalva				
Unipine 60				
Unipine 85				
Verdol				
Verdone				
Iso Butyl Quinoline				
Ambrettolide				
Celestolide				
Edenolide				
Galaxolide				
Galaxolide 50% BB				
Galaxolide 50% DEP				
Galaxolide 50% DPG				
Galaxolide 50% IPM				
Galaxolide Undiluted				
Hexadecanolide				
Luminide				
Muscemor				
Musk Z 4				
Zenolide				
Bicyclononalactone				
Cinnamalva				
Cuminyl Alcohol				
Iso Cyclo Geraniol				
Prismantol				
Veraspice				
Andrane				
Bacdanol				
Cupressus funebris wood oil				
Cedrafix				
Cedramber				
Cedryl Acetate				
Coniferan Pure				
Hexenyl Benzoate CIS-3				
Hexyl benzoate				
Tetramethyl acetyloctahydronaphthalenes				
Karmawood				
Koavone				
Kohinool				
MCK Chinese				
MCK SG				
Meth Ionone Alpha Extra				
Meth Ionone Beta Coeur				
Meth Ionone Gamma A Tocopherol				
Meth Ionone Gamma Coeur				
Meth Ionone Gamma Pure				
Mysantol				
Orivone				
Piconia				
Sanjinol				
Santaliff				
Timbersilk				
Tobacarol				
Trimofix				
Veramoss				
Vertofix Coeur				
(E,Z)-2,6-Nonadien-1-ol acetate				

== See also ==
- List of compounds
- Stench compound
