= White Linen =

1978 fragrance

Fragrance by Estée Lauder
- Category: Aldehydic Floral
- Designed for: Women
- Top notes: Primarily aldehydes
- Heart notes: Primarily Bulgarian rose, Moroccan rose, and lily of the valley
- Base notes: Primarily amber and cedarwood
- Released: 1978
- Perfumer(s): Ernest Shiftan and Sophia Grojsman
- Tagline: "Three incredibly pretty fragrances designed to interact with each other. Wear one. Wear two. Wear all three together."
- Flanker(s): White Linen Breeze (1995)
- Successor: Pure White Linen (2006); White Linen Legacy (2024)
- Awards: FiFi Awards 2002 Fragrance Hall of Fame

White Linen is an aldehydic floral fragrance released in 1978 by Estée Lauder alongside Celadon (a green floral with notes of jonquil) and Pavilion (a white floral amber). The three were Lauder's New Romantics collection, marketed as fragrances that were designed to be worn alone or layered.

== Fragrance ==
Ernest Shiftan at International Flavors & Fragrances began the creation of this fragrance; he died during its development, and the work was carried on by Sophia Grojsman.

Grojsman created a rose accord inspired by Jean Patou Joy (1929). The rose note comes from an unusually high proportion of nerol, which Calkin and Jellinek compare to the rose note in Paco Rabanne Calandre (1969). A natural rose oil adds complexity. Dimethyl benzyl carbinyl acetate (DMBCA) links the rose and woody notes. Liffarome and acetaldehyde phenyl ethyl acetal contribute a lily-of-the-valley note.

Shiftan added to it an aldehydic accord he made that was inspired by Nina Ricci Capricci (1961). After many revisions before and after Shiftan's death, White Linen was almost one percent aldehydes, 20 percent Vertofix for woody notes, 20 percent Galaxolide for the dominant musk note, combined with musk ketone, cyclopentadecanolide, and ethylene brassylate. This combination of musks from three chemically distinct families reflects a general practice of blending musk types to avoid smell blindness in consumers.

These, together with vetiver, hedione, and hydroxycitronellal, made up roughly 75 percent of the formula, along with a lot of rich Bulgarian rose oil.

The fragrance has sparkling, fruity top notes; floral middle notes; and powdery base notes:

Top notes
Primarily aldehydes; also bergamot and peach
Middle notes
Primarily Bulgarian rose, Moroccan rose, and lily of the valley; also iris, jasmine, lilac, allspice, and violet
Base notes
Primarily amber and cedarwood; also moss, sandalwood, and vetiver

=== Reception and influence ===
Calkin and Jellinek place White Linen as a further evolution of the classic floral aldehydic genre after Yves Saint Laurent Rive Gauche (1971). They also link it to Rochas Madame Rochas (1960) and Calandre, and to the aldehydic Chanel No. 5 (1921).

White Linen inspired Jacques Polge when he reformulated Chanel No. 22 in 1989.

Galaxolide belongs to the polycyclic musk family, which has strong scents that cling well to fabric, making these compounds widely used in soaps, laundry detergents, and fabric softeners. As a result, for many people in the 1960s it was the "smell of clean". White Linen was not the first popular fragrance to use Galaxolide: it featured prominently in Kiehl's Original Musk (1963), which was 92.8 percent Galaxolide, and Jōvan Musk (1972). Polycyclic musks were also prominent in a number of other best-selling fragrances of the 1980s, including Yves Saint Laurent Paris (1983), Calvin Klein Obsession (1985), and Dior's Poison (1985) and Fahrenheit (1988).

== The "New Romantics" collection and the perfume wardrobe ==
By 1978, Estée Lauder had launched five main fragrances, each purposefully representing different families and building toward the novel marketing of a "perfume wardrobe": a soft amber (Youth-Dew (1953)), a floral (Estée (1968)), a dry woody (Azurée (1969)), a crisp green (Aliage (1972)), and rich green floral (Private Collection (1973)).

White Linen was released as one of a trio of fragrances named the New Romantics collection: White Linen was positioned as a fresh and lighter scent, Celadon a greener and mid-weight scent, and Pavilion a spicy, heavier evening scent. It was the first large commercial campaigns for layering fragrances that were designed to be worn together. The company recommended that women wear the fragrances on different body parts (White Linen near the neck, Celadon mid-body, and Pavilion behind the knees) so that heavier notes would rise to meet the lighter ones; and also recommended that women could choose to apply them at different times of the day (White Linen in the morning, Celadon mid-day, and Pavilion in the evening).

Celadon and Pavilion did not sell as well as White Linen. By 1979, Estée Lauder vice president Ida Stewart began promoting the idea of having a wardrobe of fragrances to layer or wear at different times of the day, but notably not mentioning the New Romantics collection. In 1980 and 1981 interviews, founder Estée Lauder mentioned White Linen and recommended applying different fragrances throughout the day, but also without mentioning Pavilion and Celadon.

In 1980, Lauder said, "White Linen was supposed to be alone." Eight years later, then-corporate vice president Evelyn Lauder explained, "Of the three, [Celadon and Pavilion] were very popular but didn't sell as much as White Linen. The company made the decision not to promote, and the two fragrances died."

== Fragrance line extensions ==
The Estée Lauder company introduced new fragrances in the spring (in time for Mother's Day) and then relaunched them in the fall (in time for Christmas) with gift-for-purchase promotions, to maximize sales during these two seasons, which were enough to support the company for the year. If they did not have a new product to launch, they would create extensions, refreshing a mature fragrance, cosmetic, or skin treatment with new variants to gain a sales bump. This was the case, for example, with White Linen Breeze (1995).

- White Linen Breeze (1995)
- Pure White Linen (2006): a softer, modern interpretation of the 1978 fragrance
  - Pure White Light Breeze (2007): a flanker
  - Pure Whte Linen Summer Fun (2008): a limited edition
  - Pure White Linen Pink Coral (2009): a flanker
  - Pure White Linen Limited Edition (2009): a limited edition
- White Linen Legacy (2024): The Legacy Collection is five Lauder fragrances that were reinterpreted by Frédéric Malle and a team of perfumers at IFF including Anne Flipo, Carlos Benaïm, and Bruno Jovanovic
  - White Linen Legacy Oud (2025): a flanker to the 2024 Legacy fragrance
