= Beautiful (fragrance) =

1985 fragrance

Fragrance by Estée Lauder
- Category: Floral
- Designed for: Women
- Top notes: Bergamot, green notes, fruity notes, lily of the valley, mandarin, marigold
- Heart notes: Primarily Bulgarian rose and jasmine
- Base notes: Amber, beeswax, cistrus labdanum, frankincense, iris, myrrh, oakmoss, patchouli, sandalwood, tonka bean, vanilla, and vetiver
- Released: 1985
- Perfumer(s): Bernard Chant, Carlos Benaïm, Nicholas Calderone, Max Gavarry, and Sophia Grojsman
- Tagline: "This Is Your Moment to Be Beautiful"
- Flanker(s): Beautiful Sheer (2003); Beautiful Love (2006)
- Awards: FiFi Awards, 2001 Fragrance Hall of Fame

Beautiful is a classic floral bouquet fragrance that was released in 1985 by Estée Lauder. This was the last creation by Bernard Chant and the last fragrance the company founder Estée Lauder personally worked on, with Evelyn Lauder helping set the final direction.

== Fragrance ==
Bernard Chant, Carlos Benaïm, Nicholas Calderone, Max Gavarry, and Sophia Grojsman at International Flavors & Fragrances created this fragrance. The final formula includes hundreds of ingredients. Karyn Khoury described it as a blend of five different fragrances that took seven years to create:

- Chant started with the chypre accord in Dior's Diorella (1972).
- Grojsman worked on the rose part of the fragrance, with inspiration from the powdery rose in Guerlain Nahéma (1979). The final formula of Beautiful centers around Bulgarian rose, as rose oil was Lauder's favorite raw material. Bulgarian rose is also a prominent note in Private Collection (1973) and White Linen (1978).
- Calderon contributed an accord of green and iris notes, which were influenced by Chanel No. 19 (1970).
- Benaïm created two bases, one powdery and rose and the other an orange floral, which were mixed in. An overdose of Ambrettolide added fruit and musk scents.
- Gavarry helped bring all the parts from the other perfumers together and added a French sensibility to the composition.

The fragrance has green, fruity top notes; flowery middle notes; and spicy, woody base notes:

Top notes
Bergamot, green notes, fruity notes, lily of the valley, mandarin orange, and marigold
Middle notes
Primarily Bulgarian rose and jasmine; also carnation, clary sage, lily, orange blossom, thyme, tuberose, and ylang-ylang
Base notes
Amber, beeswax, cistus labdanum, frankincense, iris, myrrh, oakmoss, patchouli, sandalwood, tonka bean, vanilla, and vetiver

== Cross-selling strategy ==
According to Leonard Lauder, the company built its business on three pillars—fragrance, skin treatment, and makeup—each drawing a different segment of customers. A customer drawn in by one product could be introduced by sales staff to others in the line, broadening the company's sales beyond the original purchase.

Beautiful extended this cross-selling to a younger customer. Company research had found that women often chose a fragrance as an act of self-expression and then bought makeup and other cosmetics from that same brand. Where Estée Lauder's existing cosmetics line skewed toward women 35 and older, Beautiful was marketed to women in their late twenties, giving the flagship brand an entry point with a segment it had not previously targeted.

The same logic extended across product lines: Beautiful launched simultaneously with Lauder for Men (1985), sharing a coordinated visual identity of gold-accented packaging, with pink for Beautiful and green for Lauder for Men.

Lauder for Men had itself begun the previous year as a men's skincare line under the flagship Estée Lauder brand, launching eight products in October 1984 even though the company already sold men's skincare through its Aramis and Clinique divisions. The company placed the line under its flagship women's brand after finding that women accounted for an estimated 80 percent of the household shopping; introducing men's products through a brand already trusted by the women making those purchases made the new line easier to sell. With men's skincare now offered across all three divisions, the company captured roughly 75 percent of that market. A men's fragrance to accompany the skincare line had been planned from the start rather than added as an afterthought, and its 1985 release made Lauder for Men the first men's fragrance sold under the Estée Lauder brand itself, rather than through Aramis.

== Initial marketing ==
The company chose a romantic marketing theme of a bride, with pink and gold packaging supporting the "romantic" theme. This stood in contrast to some of the popular fragrances of the time which had marketing themes that were overtly sexual and risqué, like Calvin Klein Obsession (1985), Dior Poison (1985), and Yves Saint Laurent Opium (1977).

The name of the fragrance, too, was meant to lean toward romantic rather than sexy. In interviews, Lauder said, "I think woman are more old-fashioned than others think. Who needs sexy? Wouldn't you rather be told you look beautiful than you look sexy?" While Estée Lauder and Evelyn Lauder often claimed that the product name was chosen from exclamations of friends, then-president and CEO Leonard Lauder admitted that it came from Carol Phillips, who was then president of Clinique.

Previous marketing campaigns made extensive use of in-store promotions and print advertising. For Beautiful, they added television ads. The first ad featured Willow Bay wearing a lavish wedding gown, with Marc Cohn singing Joe Cocker's "You Are So Beautiful" in the background and the tagline "This is your moment to be Beautiful." The launch had local print advertisements in September and October that were jointly funded by Estee Lauder Inc. and the department stores, to complement the national print ads in magazines and the television ads, and Estee and Evelyn both made appearances at some store locations.

== Fragrance line extensions ==
Flankers:

- Beautiful Sheer (2003): An airy version
- Beautiful Love (2006): A lighter, more modern reinterpretation

Seasonal and limited editions:

- Beautiful Summer Bouquet (2006)
- Beautiful Summer Fun (2007)
- Beautiful Summer Fun (2008)
- Beautiful Spring Veil (2009)
- Beautiful Absolu (2020): 35th anniversary limited edition parfum

New fragrances with shared branding:

- Beautiful Belle (2018): A floral amber
  - Beautiful Belle Love (2019): Flanker
- Beautiful Magnolia (2021): A magnolia-centered fragrance
  - Beautiful Magnolia Intense (2022): Flanker
  - Beautiful Magnolia Wonderland Edition (2022)
  - Beautiful Magnolia L'Eau (2023): Flanker
  - Beautiful Magnolia Holiday Limited Edition (2023)
  - Beautiful Magnolia Fleur (2025): Flanker
