= C13H22O2 =

The molecular formula C_{13}H_{22}O_{2} (molar mass: 210.317 g/mol) may refer to:

- Geranyl propionate
- Hydroxymethylpentylcyclohexenecarboxaldehyde
