= Karyn Khoury =

American perfumer

Karyn Khoury is an American perfumer. She is Senior Vice President of Fragrance Development Worldwide for The Estée Lauder Companies. In 2012, Khoury was honored as one of the most influential fragrance developers of our time at the Visionaries Gala and Awards Ceremony by the Museum of Arts and Design in New York along with Sophia Grosjman.

== Early life and career ==
Karyn is a second generation American, and is of Syrian and Italian ancestry. She began her fragrance career at Norda (now part of Givaudan). Five years later she joined The Estée Lauder Companies where she became the manager for Aramis men’s brands. She was appointed to her current position as Senior Vice President of Corporate Fragrance Development Worldwide in 1998.

At The Estée Lauder, Khoury started working personally first with Mrs. Estée Lauder and then with Evelyn Lauder and Leonard Lauder on new fragrance creations and products

== Fragrances ==
As a creative director and olfactory evaluator, Khoury oversaw the development of:

- Estée Lauder Beautiful
- Estée Lauder Knowing
- Estée Lauder Pleasures (1996 FiFi Awards winner)
- Estée Lauder The Private Collection in collaboration with Aerin Lauder
- Estée Lauder Sensuous line
- Estée Lauder Wood Mystique
- Estée Lauder Amber Mystique
- Sean John Unforgivable Men and Unforgivable Women
- Sean John I Am King (2009 FiFi Awards winner)
- Clinique Calyx
- DKNY Be Delicious
- American Beauty Wonderful Indulgence
- Coach Coach Signature and Coach Poppy
- Tom Ford Black Orchid
- American Beauty Beloved (2009 FiFi Awards winner)
- Tommy Hilfiger Tommy and Tommy Girl
- Tom Ford Grey Vetiver (2010 FiFi Awards winner)
- Tom Ford Private Blend Collection
- Tory Burch Eau de Parfum
- Daisy Fuentes Dianoche Love
- Estée Lauder Modern Muse (2016 FiFi Awards winner)
