= Antonia's Flowers =

1984 fragrance

Fragrance by Antonia's Flowers
- Category: Floral
- Designed for: Women
- Top notes: Primarily freesia accord
- Heart notes: Primarily freesia accord
- Base notes: Primarily freesia accord
- Released: 1984
- Perfumer(s): Bernard Chant and Joséphine Catapano

Antonia's Flowers was released in 1984 by Antonia Bellanca. It was the first fragrance to use headspace technology on living flowers as part of its creation.

== History ==
Throughout the late 1970s, Antonia Bellanca worked at various flower shops. In 1981, at the age of 24, she opened her own flower shop in East Hampton, New York, which was very seasonal work. She decided to sell a fragrance to increase revenue, so when she was delivering flowers to an Estée Lauder Companies sales conference she asked who made their fragrances and got a referral to International Flavors & Fragrances (IFF). IFF agreed to create perfume samples for her, for no initial cost. She requested a fresh freesia scent similar to her flower shop. Bellanca and IFF worked on the formula for over 18 months. In 1983, after either 30 or 150 submissions, she approved one of the formulas they created.

She packaged her eau de toilette in plain bottles, and sold them from her flower shop. A pizza parlor near her flower shop had lines of people waiting outside, and she would spray her fragrance on the outside of her shop windows to promote store traffic and the fragrance. Also on the same street, her friend Ina Garten had a specialty food store and would cater Hampton parties; Bellanca would provide flower arrangements and wear her fragrance. She sold the fragrance for $15 per bottle, and sold out of her first 1,000 bottles in a single summer.

In 1984, she began selling the fragrance at Bergdorf Goodman. In 1989, after increasing distribution to other stores such as Neiman Marcus and Saks Fifth Avenue, she closed her flower shop and began working with IFF to develop more fragrances. In 1991, Antonia's Flowers, Inc., was an international fragrance business that grossed $1.2 million that year.

== Fragrance ==
Bernard Chant and Joséphine Catapano at International Flavors & Fragrances (IFF) created this fragrance.

In the early 1980s, Braja Mookherjee and other chemists at IFF were working on a headspace technology that IFF would later name "Living Flower". Headspace technology helps researchers analyze an object's scent. The object is placed in a sealed container and when it releases aroma molecules in the air, the molecules are collected and then analyzed for its chemical composition. With this information, scientists can create a copy of the scent without physically extracting it. IFF's "Living Flower" technology was able to capture the headspace of living flowers. The first perfume to use this technology was Antonia's Flowers, for which they analyzed living freesia.

The "Living Flower" technology was especially useful for the requested fragrance, which was to smell like freesia in a flower shop. Fragrance cannot be extracted from freesia flowers with a solvent, and the freshness of living flowers is different than the smell of picked flowers.

Comparison of headspace constituents for freesia
Compound	Living flower (%)	Picked flower (%)
Linalool oxides (4)	1.0	—
Linalool	78.0	91.0
cis-3-Hexenyl butyrate	0.2	trace
α-Terpineol	4.0	10.0
β-Cyclocitral	0.1	—
Nerol/geraniol	0.2	—
Dihydro-β-ionone	3.7	trace
β-Ionone	3.0	trace
4-Oxo-β-ionone	5.4	—
4-Oxo-β-ionol	2.2	—
Ethyl dimethyl pyrazine	—	0.1
Ethyl trimethyl pyrazine	—	0.2

Bernard Chant used the analysis of fresh freesia flowers to create Antonia's Flowers, adding to it only a few other notes to provide some balance. It has notes of the freesia accord throughout:

Top notes
Primarily freesia accord; also bergamot
Middle notes
Primarily freesia accord; also jasmine and magnolia
Base notes
Primarily freesia accord; also lily and sandalwood

The sales success of Antonia's Flowers led other fragrance companies to use headspace technology on fresh flowers, such as Prescriptives/Clinique Calyx (1986), Calvin Klein Eternity (1989), and Frédéric Malle Carnal Flower (2005).

== Ownership timeline ==
- 1984–2019: Owned and controlled by Antonia Bellanca through Antonia's Flowers, Inc.
- 2025–present: Production essentially ceased around 2020; the brand relaunched in 2025 but sales of Antonia's Flowers had not resumed.
