= Jōvan Musk =

1972 fragrance

Fragrance by Jōvan
- Category: Woody Floral Musk
- Designed for: Unisex
- Top notes: Primarily aldehydes
- Heart notes: Primarily musk
- Base notes: Musk
- Released: 1972
- Label: Jōvan
- Perfumer(s): Denis McAdam / Murray Moscona
- Tagline: "Drop for drop, Jovan Musk Oil works with your body’s chemistry to create a personal scent that’s yours alone.... It releases the animal instinct."

Jōvan Musk started as a fragrance oil named Jōvan Musk Oil, which had a small release in 1972 and was quickly followed by Jōvan Musk Cologne the same year. At that time, synthetic musk oils and fragrances were increasingly popular with hippies who bought them at head shops when they found that it masked the smell of cannabis.

Three men in the fragrance and cosmetics field (Bob Elias, and Richard Solomon and Herb Wilson of RH Cosmetics) noted the musk trend and decided to invest in the creation and marketing of a new musk fragrance. Denis MacAdams joined them as the perfumer. Jōvan, then a small company of two people (Barry Shipp and Bernard Mitchell) selling a single product (Mink and Pearls bath oil beads) agreed to add the new musk oil to their line. The fragrance's success spurred many other companies to launch their own musk scents.

In 1981, Jōvan signed a contract with the Rolling Stones for marketing tie-in. For $3 million, it became the exclusive sponsor of their 1981 American Tour.

== Fragrance ==
Denis McAdam created Jōvan Musk Oil. At the time one synthetic musk in particular, Galaxolide, was added in great quantities to laundry detergent and fabric softener. The oil's final formula used Galaxolide and ethylene brassylate, diluted in dipropylene glycol instead of the alcohol that perfumes would have. McAdam would later join Belle-Aire Fragrances (now Givaudan).

Jōvan then brought in Murray Moscona at International Flavors & Fragrances (IFF) to create a cologne. He created a musk accord with Galaxolide and ethylene brassylate and kept this accord at about 80% of the formula, added a No. 5 floral aldehyde top note, and finished with amber and wood notes. With this final fragrance, IFF then sold a formula that Jovan could mix with Denis's oil to become Jovan Musk Cologne.

The cologne has sparkling, floral top notes; musky floral middle notes; and powdery, musky base notes:

- Top notes: Primarily aldehydes; also bergamot, jasmine, and neroli
- Middle notes: Primarily musk; also patchouli, sandalwood, and ylang-ylang
- Base notes: Musk

Today there are also Jōvan Musk varieties of aftershave and deodorant, as well as a Musk Oil Gold for women. The fragrance is commonly sold at drug store and superstore chains.

=== Ownership timeline ===
- 1972: Jōvan fragrances launched by Jōvan.
- 1979: Beecham Group bought Jōvan for $85 million (equivalent to $391 million in 2026).
- 1988: Jōvan was sold in a leveraged buyout. The company was renamed Quintessence Incorporated and the fragrance was still marketed as Jōvan.
- 1992: Benckiser Consumer Products acquired Quintessence, and then merged it into Coty.
