= C15H14O2 =

The molecular formula C_{15}H_{14}O_{2} (molar mass : 226.27 g/mol, exact mass: 226.0994 u) may refer to:

- Flavan-3-ol
- Flavan-4-ol
- Phenethyl benzoate
