= IFRA =

IFRA may refer to:

- INCA-FIEJ Research Association or IFRA (publishing), a former international publishing industry organisation, formed from the merger of the International Newspaper Colour Association (INCA) and Federation Internationale des Editeurs de Journaux et Publications (FIEJ), IFRA merged with the World Association of Newspapers (WAN) to form WAN-IFRA
- International Fragrance Association
