= C12H18O =

The molecular formula C_{12}H_{18}O (molar mass: 178.27 g/mol, exact mass: 178.1358 u) may refer to:

- Amylmetacresol (AMC)
- 2,4-Dimethyl-6-tert-butylphenol
- Phenylisohexanol
- Propofol
