= C14H26O2 =

The molecular formula C_{14}H_{26}O_{2} (molar mass: 226.36 g/mol) may refer to:

- Myristoleic acid
- Bornafix
