= OR10J5 =

Protein-coding gene in humans

Identifiers
- Aliases: OR10J5, OR1-28, olfactory receptor family 10 subfamily J member 5, OLFR16, MOR23
- External IDs: MGI: 106648; GeneCards: OR10J5

Gene location (Human)
Chr.	Chromosome 1 (human)
Band	1q23.2	Start	159,535,078 bp
Band	1q23.2	End	159,536,007 bp

Gene location (Mouse)
Chr.	Chromosome 1 (mouse)
Band	1|1 H3	Start	172,777,976 bp
Band	1|1 H3	End	172,785,924 bp
RNA expression pattern
Bgee	Human / Mouse (ortholog); Top expressed in: testicle; gonad; liver / Top expressed in: spermatid; respiratory epithelium; nasal epithelium; olfactory epithelium; spermatocyte; gastrula; gland; endocrine gland; abdominal segment of trunk; choroid plexus of fourth ventricle; More reference expression data
BioGPS	n/a
Gene ontology
Molecular function	G protein-coupled receptor activity; olfactory receptor activity; signal transducer activity; neurotransmitter receptor activity; G protein-coupled serotonin receptor activity
Cellular component	integral component of membrane; plasma membrane; membrane; integral component of plasma membrane; dendrite
Biological process	sensory perception of smell; detection of chemical stimulus involved in sensory perception of smell; signal transduction; response to stimulus; G protein-coupled serotonin receptor signaling pathway; G protein-coupled receptor signaling pathway; G protein-coupled receptor signaling pathway, coupled to cyclic nucleotide second messenger; chemical synaptic transmission
Sources:Amigo / QuickGO
Orthologs
Databases	NCBI: entry; OMA: entry
Species	Human	Mouse
Entrez	127385	18313
Ensembl	ENSG00000184155	ENSMUSG00000037924
UniProt	Q8NHC4	Q62007
RefSeq (mRNA)	NM_001004469	NM_008763
RefSeq (protein)	NP_001004469	NP_032789
Location (UCSC)	Chr 1: 159.54 – 159.54 Mb	Chr 1: 172.78 – 172.79 Mb
PubMed search
- Wikidata
View/Edit Human	View/Edit Mouse

Olfactory receptor 10J5 is a protein that in humans is encoded by the OR10J5 gene.

Olfactory receptors interact with odorant molecules in the nose, to initiate a neuronal response that triggers the perception of a smell. The olfactory receptor proteins are members of a large family of G-protein-coupled receptors (GPCR) arising from single coding-exon genes. Olfactory receptors share a 7-transmembrane domain structure with many neurotransmitter and hormone receptors and are responsible for the recognition and G protein-mediated transduction of odorant signals. The olfactory receptor gene family is the largest in the genome. The nomenclature assigned to the olfactory receptor genes and proteins for this organism is independent of other organisms.

== Ligands ==
OR10J5 is a relatively narrowly tuned receptor, meaning it responds only to a relatively small set of related odorants.

Ligands include Lyral, an aldehyde with a soft floral scent.
