= C17H30O =

The molecular formula C_{17}H_{30}O (molar mass: 250.426 g/mol) may refer to:

- Grisalva
- Civetone
