= David Michael =

David Michael may refer to:

- David Michael (politician) (born 1980), member of the Western Australian Legislative Assembly
- David Tibet (David Michael Bunting, born 1960), British poet and artist
- David Moritz Michael (1751–1827), composer
- David Michael & Co., an American food science company
- David Michael (rugby league) (born 1958)
