= Amber Xtreme =

Names
- IUPAC name 2,2,6,6,7,8,8-Heptamethyl-3,3a,4,5,5a,7,8a,8b-octahydrocyclopenta[g][1]benzofuran

Identifiers
CAS Number	476332-65-7
3D model (JSmol)	Interactive image
ChemSpider	57523118
ECHA InfoCard	100.104.188
EC Number	449-360-4
PubChem CID	92030006
UNII	89ZYZ7YI66
CompTox Dashboard (EPA)	DTXSID9051379
- InChI: InChI=1S/C18H32O/c1-11-17(4,5)13-9-8-12-10-16(2,3)19-15(12)14(13)18(11,6)7/h11-15H,8-10H2,1-7H3 Key: HUYXPANWJVOYCI-UHFFFAOYSA-N
- SMILES: CC1C(C2CCC3CC(OC3C2C1(C)C)(C)C)(C)C

Properties
Chemical formula	C_{18}H_{32}O
Molar mass	264.453 g·mol^{−1}
- Except where otherwise noted, data are given for materials in their standard state (at 25 °C [77 °F], 100 kPa). Infobox references

Amber Xtreme is a fragrance compound with the molecular formula C_{18}H_{32}O. According to International Flavors & Fragrances Inc., it has an "amber, woody" scent.

== See also ==
- List of fragrance compounds
