= Oscar (fragrance) =

1977 fragrance

Fragrance by Oscar de la Renta
- Category: Floral Amber
- Designed for: Women
- Top notes: Primarily orange blossom
- Heart notes: Primarily tuberose and ylang-ylang
- Base notes: Primarily vanilla
- Released: 1977
- Perfumer(s): Jean-Louis Sieuzac
- Tagline: "Oscar knows what makes a woman beautiful"
- Flanker(s): Oscar Tropical (2002); Esprit d'Oscar (2011); Oscar Flor (2015); Oscar Velvet (2016); Oscar Velvet Noir (2016)
- Awards: FiFi Awards 1978 Women's Fragrance of the Year–Prestige

Oscar de la Renta, later renamed Oscar, is a floral amber fragrance that was released in 1977 by Oscar de la Renta. It helped revive an older floral amber tradition which had few major representations in the prior decades. Its success helped establish the floral amber style within the major designer-fragrance boom of the late 1970s and 1980s.

In 1978, it won a FiFi award. Twenty years after it launched, it continued to be one of the 20 top-selling fragrances.

== Fragrance ==
Jean-Louis Sieuzac at Roure Bertrand Dupont created this fragrance.

De la Renta was from the Dominican Republic. When a perfumer asked about his favorite flowers, he named several including the ylang-ylang from his native country. He also wanted to create a fragrance evocative of an earlier era; his wife Françoise de Langlade wore Guerlain L'Heure Bleue (1914) which reflected the romantic sensibility he sought. With that brief, Sieuzac started with an accord based on Guerlain Vol de Nuit (1933), then started anew with an accord based on L'Heure Bleue.

The fragrance has a carnation accord developed with eugenol, and the orange blossom note comes from Schiff bases of methyl anthranilate; Calkin and Jellinek identify these two elements as the most important constituents shaping the perfume's character. Hedione and Jessemal contribute more floral notes, and Vertofix adding a woody note.

The fragrance has fresh top notes; floral middle notes; and spicy base notes:

Top notes
Primarily orange blossom; also basil, bergamot, cascarilla, and coriander
Middle notes
Primarily tuberose and ylang-ylang; also Bulgarian rose, coumarin, genet (broom), heliotrope, iris, jasmine, and vetiver
Base notes
Primarily vanilla; also amber, benzoin, castoreum, clove, musk, myrrh, patchouli, opopanax, and sandalwood

=== Genealogy ===
Calkin and Jellinek place Oscar within a wider family of "floral sweet" perfumes descended from Coty L'Origan (1905) and Guerlain L'Heure Bleue (1912), sharing a characteristic accord of ylang-ylang and eugenol (carnation), Schiff bases producing an orange blossom or tuberose note, methyl ionone, and vanillin with heliotropin and coumarin; this lineage continues through Oscar to Poison (1985) and Cacharel LouLou (1987). Calkin and Jellinek do not specify which aldehyde was used to form Oscar's Schiff base; by contrast, in Poison, which placed even greater emphasis on methyl anthranilate, they note the use of named aldehydes including Lyral, Canthoxal, and Lilial to form comparable Schiff bases.

== Fragrance line extensions ==
Oscar de la Renta introduced many fragrances marketed under the Oscar name, including limited, seasonal, and special editions, and a separate line of men's fragrances, but few are explicitly flankers despite sharing the Oscar name.

Rebranding:

- Oscar (1999): became the new name for the former Oscar de la Renta (1977).

Flankers and reinterpretations:

- Oscar Tropical (2002): a floral-fruity interpretation
- Esprit d'Oscar (2011): a modern reinterpretation, not to be confused with Oscar Esprit de Parfum (1987) or Oscar Esprit (1977)
- Oscar Flor (2015)
- Oscar Velvet (2016) and Oscar Velvet Noir (2016)

Oscar-branded limited/special editions, not necessarily olfactorily descended from Oscar (1977):

- Oscar Summer Dew (2004)
- Oscar Citrus (2005)
- Oscar Marine Spirit (2005)
- Oscar Violet (2005)
- Oscar (2006)
- Oscar Bamboo (2006)
- Oscar Gold (2006)
- Oscar Island Flowers (2006)
- Oscar Tropical Flowers (2006)
- Oscar Celebration (2007)
- Oscar Limited Edition (2007)
- Oscar Pink Lily (2007)
- Oscar Red Orchid (2007)
- Oscar Red Satin (2007)
- Oscar Summer Dew (2007)
- Oscar Summer Tropical Colors (2007)
- Oscar Fresh Vanilla (2008): not to be confused with their Fresh Vanilla (2007) created by Sonia Constant
- Oscar Soft Amber (2008)
- Oscar Summer (2008)
- Oscar Sheer Freesia (2009)
- Oscar Blue Velvet (2019)

Separate fragrances sharing the Oscar name:

- Oscar for Men (1980/2000 relaunch) and Oscar de la Renta pour Lui (1980/1982)
- Oscar Latin Light (2003)

== Ownership timeline ==
The Oscar de la Renta fashion company retained ownership of the brand but the license to manufacture and sell the perfume itself changed over time:

- 1977: Milton Stern partnered with Oscar de la Renta to create this fragrance, and Stern Fragrances (Parfums Stern) was a license holder that manufactured the fragrance.
- 1987: Avon Products bought Stern Fragrances (Parfums Stern) for $160 million, and thus became the license holder to make and market Oscar.
- 1989: Sanofi bought the Parfums Stern fragrance unit of Avon Products for $210 million, and thus became Oscar's license holder.
- 1999: Groupe Artémis bought Sanofi Beauté, and renames it YSL Beauté. A few months later, Gucci Group bought it for about $1 billion.
- 2008: L’Oréal bought YSL Beauté Holding (then part of Gucci Group, which was a subsidiary of PPR) for $1.68 billion.
- 2009: Oscar de la Renta, led by then-CEO Alex Bolen, regained the fragrance license after a dispute with L’Oréal about Oscar fragrances being sold via L’Oréal's Elizabeth Arden division in lower-end outlets and with less expensive packaging.
- 2009–2013: The Oscar fragrances were manufactured and sold by Oscar de La Renta, LLC, with no licensing deals in place.
- 2013–present: Inter Parfums gained the license to manufacture and sell Oscar, and this license is extended to 2031 with an option to extend to 2036.
