= Grisalva =

Names
- IUPAC name 3a-Ethyl-6,6,9a-trimethyl-3,4,5,5a,7,8,9,9b-octahydro-1H-benzo[e][2]benzofuran
- Other names Amber furan

Identifiers
| CAS Number | 217816-75-6 |
| 3D model (JSmol) | Interactive image |
| PubChem CID | 90474858 |
- InChI: InChI=1S/C17H30O/c1-5-17-10-11-18-16(17,4)9-6-13-12-15(2,3)8-7-14(13)17/h13-14H,5-12H2,1-4H3 Key: AYHBUKCLFLUGTA-UHFFFAOYSA-N
- SMILES: CCC12CCC3C(CCCC3(C1COC2)C)(C)C

Properties
| Chemical formula | C_{17}H_{30}O |
| Molar mass | 250.426 g·mol^{−1} |

Related compounds
| Related compounds | Cetalor |
- Except where otherwise noted, data are given for materials in their standard state (at 25 °C [77 °F], 100 kPa). Infobox references

Grisalva is a fragrance compound with the molecular formula C_{17}H_{30}O. According to International Flavors & Fragrances Inc., it has an "ambergris" scent "of remarkable strength". It has also been described to have an "ambergris, animal(-like), dry, amber, fresh, (and) metallic" scent.

== See also ==
- List of fragrance compounds
