= Jon Erik Fyrwald =

American businessman, former Chief Executive Officer of Syngenta Group

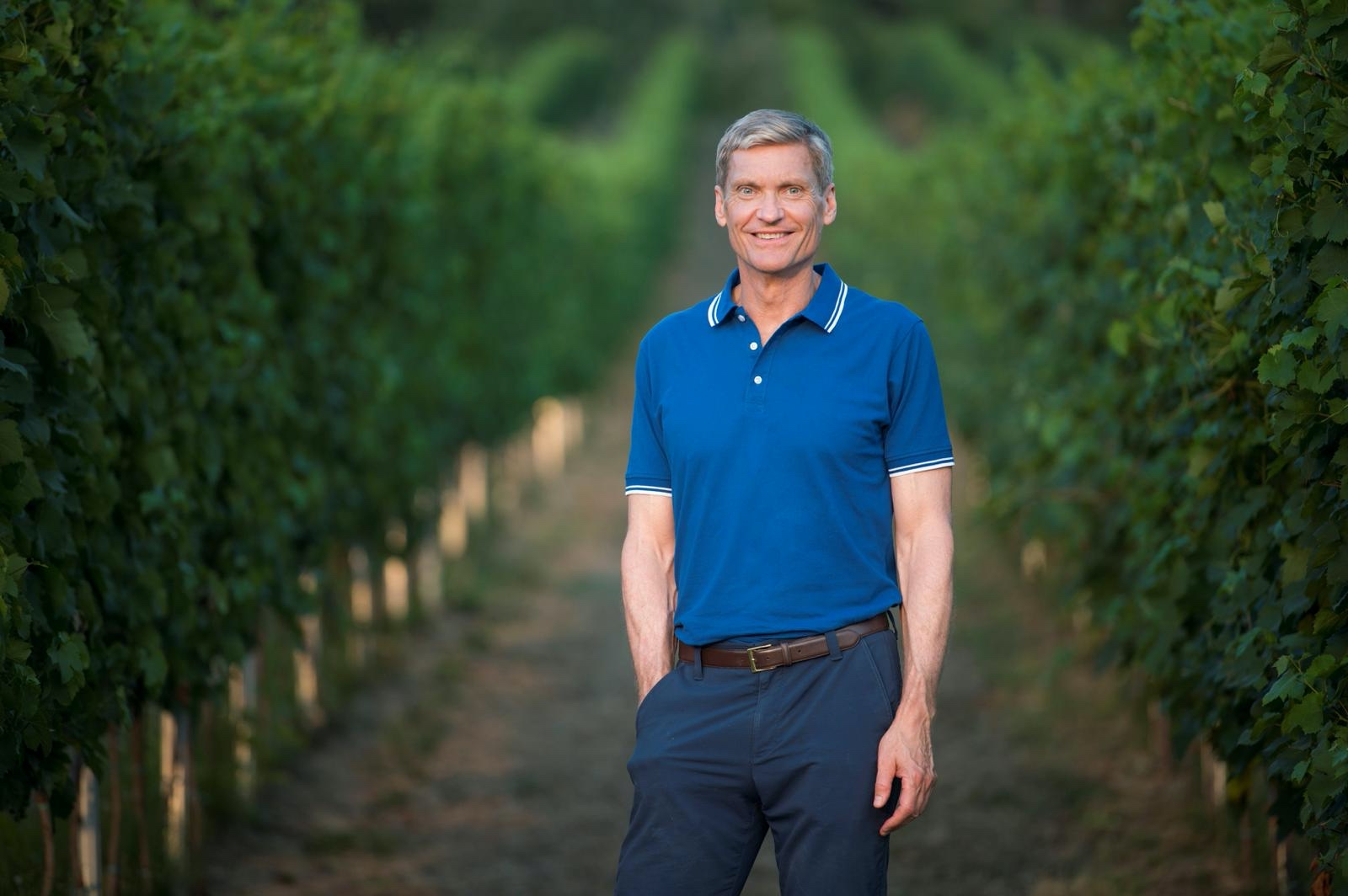
- J. Erik Fyrwald
- Born: July 29, 1959 (age 67); West Virginia, U.S.
- Education: University of Delaware; Harvard Business School
- Occupation: Manager
- Employer: International Flavors & Fragrances
- Title: Chief executive officer; executive director
- Board member of: Eli Lilly and Company

J. Erik Fyrwald (born July 29, 1959) is an American businessman. He is chief executive officer of International Flavors & Fragrances and member of the IFF Board of Directors. He is the former chief executive officer of the Syngenta Group and served as executive director of the board of directors and chairman of the Syngenta Foundation. He is a member of the Eli Lilly Board of Directors since 2005.

== Early life ==
Fyrwald was born in the United States in 1959, where he spent much of his childhood. Fyrwald's parents are originally from Norway, where he also lived. After school, he attended the University of Delaware, where he received a bachelor of science in chemical engineering. He also completed the advanced management program at the Harvard Business School.

== Career ==
Fyrwald began his professional career at the chemical company DuPont. He held various management positions in production, sales, and marketing, for example. In 2003, he assumed responsibility for the entire agriculture and nutrition division. Alongside, Fyrwald was also appointed to the board of directors of CropLife International. In 2008, Fyrwald was appointed chief executive officer and chairman of the board of directors of Nalco, a water treatment provider. Following the acquisition by EcoLab in 2011, he served as president at the parent company. In 2012, Fyrwald became president and chief executive officer of Univar, a distributor of chemistry and related products.

In 2016, Fyrwald was appointed chief executive officer of Syngenta, mainly because of his long experience in the chemical industry. A year later, Syngenta was acquired by the state-owned China National Chemical Corporation (ChemChina) and delisted from the stock exchange. Fyrwald expressly supported the takeover by ChemChina, as he considered the acquisition an important step with regards to growth prospects, especially in China. To date, the transaction has been the largest acquisition of a Chinese company abroad. In 2020, the Syngenta merged with Sinochem and Adama to create the Syngenta Group.

Syngenta was accused of selling highly toxic pesticides as part of its business. Fyrwald addressed this by aligning the company to digital innovation and new agricultural technologies in the combat against climate change. After President Joe Biden recommitted the United States to the Paris Accord, Fyrwald wrote an op-ed calling for the US to embrace regenerative agriculture.

In 2023, it was announced that Fyrwald would retire at the end of the year as Chief Executive Officer of the Syngenta Group. He was succeeded by Jeff Rowe, who transitioned from his role as President of Syngenta Crop Protection, Syngenta Group’s largest business unit. Fyrwald continues to serve as an advisor to the Chairman of Syngenta Group and remains on the Board of Directors.

In January 2024, IFF appointed Fyrwald as Chief Executive Officer and Board Director.

== Memberships ==
Fyrwald is a member of the board of directors of Eli Lilly and Company, the Swiss-American Chamber of Commerce and Breakthrough, a community service organization in East Garfield Park, Chicago.
