= International Fragrance Association =

Fragrance industry organization

The International Fragrance Association (IFRA) is the global representative body of the fragrance industry. It seeks to represent the collective interests of the industry and promote the safe use of fragrances through regulation.

The association was founded in 1973 and has its head office in Geneva, Switzerland, and its operations centre in Brussels, Belgium. Its membership includes multinational companies (known as 'Regular Members'), national associations, and supporting members from countries where IFRA does not have a national association. As of October 2022, its membership includes seven multinational companies (known as 'Regular Members') and 23 national associations. There are twelve 'Supporting Members'.

IFRA is led by a president, Alexander Mohr PhD, and by a Board headed by its chairman, Paul Andersson.

== History ==
In 2020, in response to the ongoing and increasing focus on sustainability in the beauty and fragrance sectors, IFRA, in association with the International Organization of the Flavor Industry (IOFI), launched the "IFRA-IOFI Sustainability Charter." This charter has subsequently been updated with a second edition launched in 2023, with a third planned for 2025.

== Objectives and roles ==
IFRA is the official self-regulatory representative body of the fragrance industry worldwide. Its main purpose is to ensure the safety of fragrance materials through a dedicated science program. IFRA publishes a list of usage standards for fragrance materials, limiting or prohibiting the use of ingredients, based on the findings of the Research Institute for Fragrance Materials (RIFM), which gathers data regarding the safety of fragrance materials. Concerns have been raised about RIFM and IFRA's process, lack of transparency, and effectiveness as a safeguard. RIFM's list of restricted and prohibited ingredients is only available through subscription and may offer little guidance to manufacturers.

=== IFRA Standards ===
The most recent iteration of the IFRA standards was published in January 2022, integrating all foregoing standards up to and including the "50th Amendment." Within the standards, included ingredients are prohibited (disallowed as a fragrance ingredient), restricted (allowed as fragrance ingredient only in prescribed quantities), or have accompanying specifications regarding their use (such ingredients are only allowed if they comply with specific criteria outlined in the Standard).

== People and structure ==
IFRA's day-to-day operations are led by its president. Since 2024, this role has been occupied by Alexander Mohr, heading a team of more than ten staff members based principally in Brussels.

IFRA's main decision-making body is its Board, headed by the IFRA Chairman, Paul Andersson. The Board has twelve voting members: eight representing the Regular Members, and four regional representatives of national associations.

== Membership as of October 2022 ==
=== Regular Members ===
- Robertet
- Symrise
- Takasago
- BASF
- dsm-Firmenich
- Givaudan
- International Flavors & Fragrances

=== National Associations ===
- Argentine Chamber of Manufacturers of Aromatic Products (CAFEPA)
- Flavour & Fragrance Association of Australia & New Zealand (FFAANZ)
- Brazilian Association of the Essential Oils, Fragrances and Aromas Industries (ABIFRA)
- Bulgarian National Association Essential Oils, Perfumery and Cosmetics (BNAEOPC)
- Fragrance Creators Association (FCA; Canada)
- Fragrance Science & Advocacy Council (FSAC; Canada)
- Chilean Association of Flavors and Fragrances (ACHISAF)
- China Association of Flavor, Fragrance & Cosmetic Industries (CAFFCI)
- Chamber of the Flavor and Fragrance Industry (CISF; Colombia)
- National Union of Manufacturers of Aromatic Products (Prodarom; France)
- German Association of Fragrance Manufacturers (DVRH)
- Indonesian Flavor and Fragrance Association (AFFI)
- National Association of Fine Chemicals Companies and Specialist Sectors (AISPEC; Italy)
- Japan Flavor & Fragrance Materials Association (JFFMA)
- Korea Flavor & Fragrance Association (KFFA)
- National Association of Manufacturers of Aromatic Products (ANFPA; Mexico)
- Association of Fragrance & Flavoring Manufacturers (NEA; Netherlands)
- Flavor & Fragrance Association Singapore (FFAS)
- South African Association of the Flavour & Fragrance Industry (SAAFFI)
- Spanish Association of Fragrances and Food Aromas (AEFAA)
- Swiss Flavour and Fragrance Industry Association (SFFIA)
- Food Flavors and Fragrance Oils Manufacturers Association (AREP; Turkey)
- IFRA United Kingdom (IFRA UK)
- Fragrance Creators Association (FCA; USA)
- Fragrance Science & Advocacy Council (FASC; USA)
