= Ambrinol 95 =

Names
- IUPAC name 2,5,5-Trimethyl-1,2,3,4,4a,5,6,7-octahydronaphthalen-2-ol
- Other names: alpha-ambrinol; 1,2,3,4,4a,5,6,7-octahydro-2,2,5-trimethyl-2-naphthalenol

Identifiers
CAS Number	41199-19-3
3D model (JSmol)	Interactive image
ChemSpider	142636
ECHA InfoCard	100.050.216
EC Number	255-256-8
PubChem CID	162452
CompTox Dashboard (EPA)	DTXSID1052084
- InChI: InChI=1S/C13H22O/c1-12(2)7-4-5-10-9-13(3,14)8-6-11(10)12/h5,11,14H,4,6-9H2,1-3H3 Key: GPVOTKFXWGURGP-UHFFFAOYSA-N
- SMILES: CC1(CCC=C2C1CCC(C2)(C)O)C

Properties
Chemical formula	C_{13}H_{22}O
Molar mass	194.318 g·mol^{−1}

Hazards
- GHS labelling
Pictograms	(GHS07: Exclamation mark)
Signal word	Warning
Hazard statements	H315, H412
Precautionary statements	P264, P273, P280, P302+P352, P321, P332+P317, P362+P364, P501
- Except where otherwise noted, data are given for materials in their standard state (at 25 °C [77 °F], 100 kPa). Infobox references

Ambrinol 95 is a fragrance compound with the molecular formula C_{13}H_{22}O. According to International Flavors & Fragrances Inc., it has an "ambergris, tobacco, leathery, and seaweed" scent. It has also been described to have an "amber, woody, arthy, rooty, herbal, animal(-like), old, wood, humus, tea(-like)" scent.

== See also ==
- List of fragrance compounds
