= Joséphine Catapano =

American perfumer (1918-2012)

Joséphine Catapano (December 29, 1918 – May 14, 2012) was an American perfumer.

== Biography ==
Joséphine Catapano studied at Hunter High School and Hunter College before starting a career in the perfume industry. In 1953, she created Estée Lauder's first fragrance and perennial best-seller, Youth Dew, a bath oil that also functioned as a perfume.

Catapano is cited as a mentor and influence to Sophia Grosjman. She worked as an executive at International Flavors and Fragrances.

== Awards and recognition ==
Catapano received the Cosmetic Career Women's Award in 1980. In 1993, Catapano received the Lifetime Achievement Award by the American Society of Perfumers.

== Creations ==
- Estée Lauder Youth-Dew (1953)—Perfumer and author Victoria Belim notes that many sources name Shiftan as a co-creator of Estee Lauder's Youth-Dew and White Linen but that this is incorrect: Shiftan was a vice-president at IFF, so he name was automatically attached to fragrances created at that time.
- Shiseido Zen (1964)
- Guy Laroche Fidji (1966)
- Norell Norell (1968)
- Estée Lauder Cinnabar (1978) (with Bernard Chant)
- Ralph Lauren Chaps (1979)
- Aramis JHL (1982) (with Bernard Chant)
- Antonia's Flowers Antonia's Flowers (1984) (with Bernard Chant)

== Personal life ==
She died on May 14, 2012.

== External References ==
- Edwards, Michael. Perfume Legends: French Feminine Fragrances. 1996.
