= Robert Amen =

American businessman

Robert M. Amen (born 1950) served as president of International Paper from 2003 to 2006. He served as the chairman and CEO of International Flavors and Fragrances from 2006 to 2009. He is Chairman of the Deming Center Advisory Board at Columbia University. He is chairman of Verso Paper.

== Early life and education ==
He was born in Manhattan, New York City in 1949. He has a bachelor's degree in economics from Boston College and an M.B.A. from Columbia Business School, where he graduated in 1973.

== Career ==
Amen joined International Paper in 1980 as an assistant treasurer. From 1996 to 2000, he served as the president of International Paper, Europe, residing in Belgium. He was an executive vice president from 2000 to 2003 and was president of International Paper from 2003 to March 2006.

He served as the chairman and CEO of International Flavors and Fragrances from July 1, 2006, to September 30, 2009. He was replaced by Douglas Tough.

He served as a director of Wyeth starting on October 1, 2007, until it was acquired by Pfizer in October 2009.

He served as the non-executive director of Balfour Beatty from June 10, 2010, to December 31, 2015.

He became chairman of the board of Verso Paper on August 31, 2016. Under his tenure the corporate headquarters were moved from Tennessee to Miami Township, Montgomery County, Ohio.
