= Cassiffix =

Names
- Other names: 3-Cyclohexene-1-methanol, 3(or 4)-methyl-1-(2,2,3-trimethyl-3-cyclopenten-1-yl)-, acid-isomerized; Trimethylcyclopentenylmethyloxabicyclooctane

Identifiers
CAS Number	426218-78-2; 139539-66-5; 139539-67-6

Properties
Chemical formula	C_{16}H_{26}O
Molar mass	234.383 g·mol^{−1}
Appearance	colourless liquid
Odor	fruity
Density	0.9800 - 0.9880 g/cm^{3}
Melting point	−25.00 °C (−13.00 °F; 248.15 K)
Boiling point	301.5 °C (574.7 °F; 574.6 K)
Solubility in water	0.0111 g/L (20 °C)
log P	4

Hazards
- GHS labelling
Pictograms	(GHS07: Exclamation mark)
Signal word	Warning
Hazard statements	H315, H319
Precautionary statements	P280, P302+P352, P305+P351+P338
Flash point	144.50 °C (292.10 °F; 417.65 K)
Autoignition temperature	240 °C (464 °F; 513 K)
- Except where otherwise noted, data are given for materials in their standard state (at 25 °C [77 °F], 100 kPa). Infobox references

Cassiffix is a fragrance compound with the molecular formula C_{16}H_{26}O. According to International Flavors & Fragrances Inc., it has a "fruity, green, cassis note."

== See also ==
- List of fragrance compounds
