= Amberketal =

Names
- IUPAC name 5,5,9,13-tetramethyl-14,16-dioxatetracyclo[11.2.1.0^{1,10}.0^{4,9}]hexadecane
- Other names: Ambermor Ketal Crystal

Identifiers
CAS Number	57345-19-4
3D model (JSmol)	Interactive image; Interactive image
ChemSpider	84526
EC Number	260-686-4
PubChem CID	93639
- InChI: InChI=1S/C18H30O2/c1-15(2)8-5-9-16(3)13(15)7-11-18-12-19-17(4,20-18)10-6-14(16)18/h13-14H,5-12H2,1-4H3 Key: PHNCACYNYORRNS-UHFFFAOYSA-N
- SMILES: CC1(CCCC2(C1CCC34C2CCC(O3)(OC4)C)C)C; CC12CCC3C(O1)(CO2)CCC4(C)C3(C)CCCC4(C)(C)

Properties
Chemical formula	C_{18}H_{30}O_{2}
Molar mass	278.436 g·mol^{−1}
- Except where otherwise noted, data are given for materials in their standard state (at 25 °C [77 °F], 100 kPa). Infobox references

Amberketal or, commercially, Ambermor Ketal Crystal is a fragrance compound. It has a molecular formula C_{18}H_{30}O_{2}. According to International Flavors & Fragrances Inc., it has an "extremely powerful woody" scent.

== Ambermor Ketal IPM ==
Ambermor Ketal IPM is a mixture of amberketal in isopropyl myristate.

== See also ==
- List of fragrance compounds
