= Cedramber =

Names
- IUPAC name (8α)-8-Methoxycedrane
- Other names: octahydro-6-methoxy-3,6,8,8-tetramethyl-(3R,3aS,6R,7R,8aS)-1H-3a,7-Methanoazulene; Cedryl methyl ether; Methyl Cedryl Ether; (1S,2R,5S,7R,8R)-8-methoxy-2,6,6,8-tetramethyltricyclo[5.3.1.0^{1,5}]undecane

Identifiers
CAS Number	67874-81-1
3D model (JSmol)	Interactive image
ChemSpider	9260942
ECHA InfoCard	100.061.354
EC Number	267-510-5
PubChem CID	11085796
UNII	84S7T555CV
CompTox Dashboard (EPA)	DTXSID90886996
- InChI: InChI=1S/C16H28O/c1-11-6-7-12-14(2,3)13-10-16(11,12)9-8-15(13,4)17-5/h11-13H,6-10H2,1-5H3/t11-,12+,13-,15-,16+/m1/s1 Key: HRGPYCVTDOECMG-RHBQXOTJSA-N
- SMILES: C[C@@H]1CC[C@@H]2[C@]13CC[C@@]([C@H](C3)C2(C)C)(C)OC

Properties
Chemical formula	C_{16}H_{28}O
Molar mass	236.399 g/mol
Appearance	Colourless liquid
Odor	woody
Density	1.0±0.1 g/cm^{3}
Boiling point	259 °C (498 °F; 532 K)
Vapor pressure	0.0±0.5 kPa (20 °C)
Refractive index (n_{D})	1.496 (10.5 °C)

Hazards
- GHS labelling
Pictograms	(GHS07: Exclamation mark) (GHS09: Environmental hazard)
Signal word	Warning
Hazard statements	H315, H317, H319, H332, H410
Precautionary statements	P261, P264, P264+P265, P271, P272, P273, P280, P302+P352, P304+P340, P305+P351+P338, P317, P321, P333+P317, P337+P317, P362+P364, P391, P501
- Except where otherwise noted, data are given for materials in their standard state (at 25 °C [77 °F], 100 kPa). Infobox references

(8α)-8-Methoxycedrane (also called Cedramber) is a fragrance compound. According to International Flavors & Fragrances Inc., it has a woody, ambergris odor.

== Preparation ==
Cedryl methyl ether can be prepared from cedrol. Cedrol reacts with sodium hydride to form the sodium salt, which can be methylated by dimethyl sulfate.

== Safety ==
All endpoints were cleared in a safety assessment by the Research Institute for Fragrance Materials.
