= Frutarom =

Flavor and fragrance company

Frutarom Industries Ltd.
- Industry: Chemicals, food
- Founded: 1933; 93 years ago
- Founder: Yehuda Araten, Maurice Gerzon
- Headquarters: Haifa, Israel
- Key people: Ori Yehudai, President and CEO; Dr. John J. Farber, Chairman
- Products: Flavors and fragrances
- Revenue: US$ 872.8 million (2015)
- Operating income: US$ 130.25 million (2015)
- Net income: US$ 96.08 million (2015)
- Total assets: US$ 1,318.48 million (2015)
- Total equity: US$ 551.68 million (2015)
- Number of employees: 2,700
- Parent: International Flavors and Fragrances

Frutarom Industries Ltd. (Hebrew: פרוטרום תעשיות בע"מ) is an Israeli-based company that specializes in the production and distribution of extracts for flavor and fragrance. In 2015 it recorded sales of over $872 million.

Shares of the company traded on the London Stock Exchange and the Tel Aviv Stock Exchange until it was acquired by International Flavors & Fragrances in 2018.

The company is traded in the Tel Aviv Stock Exchange under the symbol FRUTF, and is part of the Tel Aviv 35 Index.

== Overview ==
The Frutarom Group is a flavor and ingredients company based in Haifa, Israel. The company develops, manufactures, and markets an extensive variety of flavors and ingredients catered to customers in a range of industries around the world. Frutarom operates through flavors and fine ingredients divisions.

== History ==
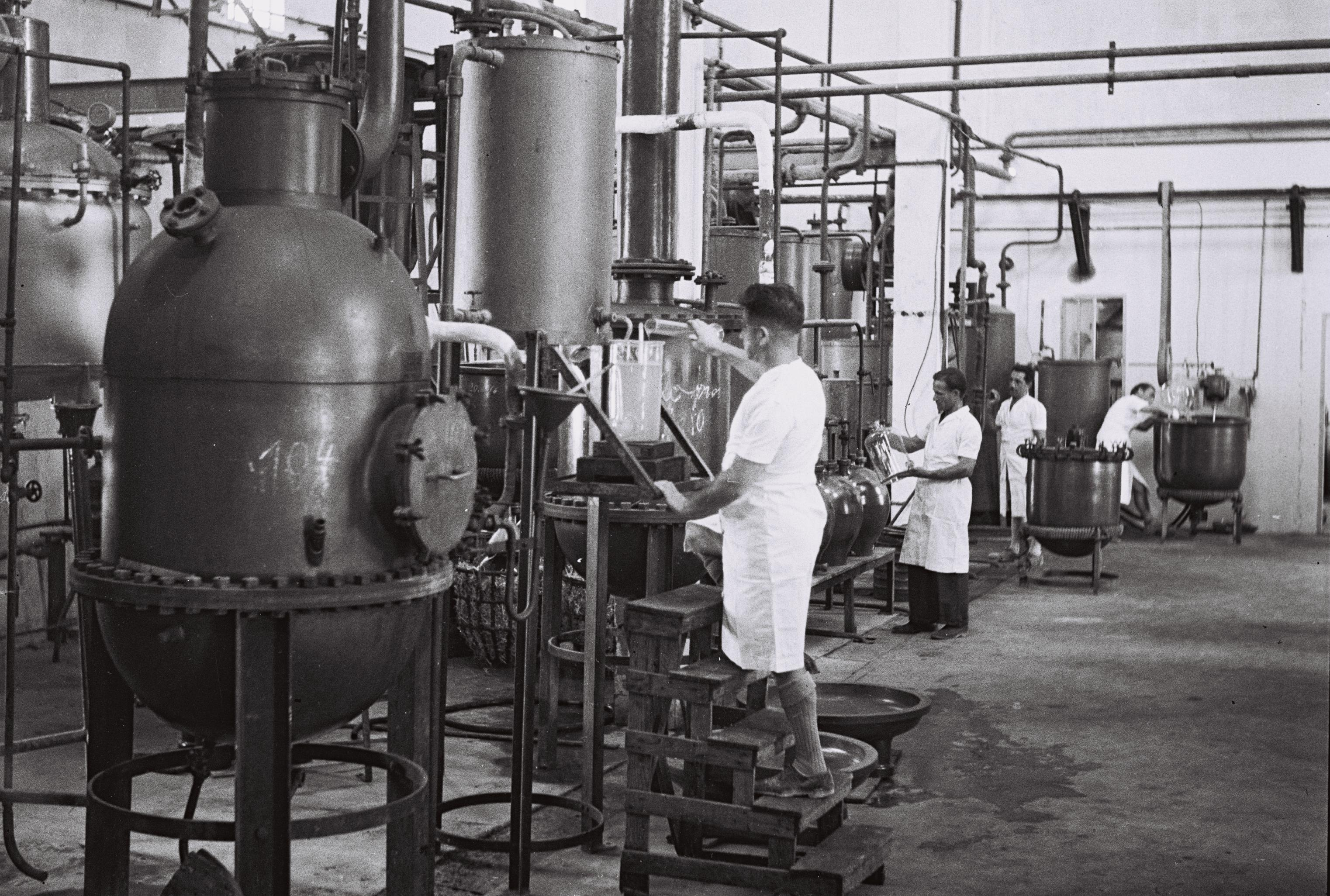
The main hall at the "FRUTAROM"

Frutarom was established by Yehuda Araten and Maurice Gerzon, two industrialists from the Netherlands in 1933. They chose to build their first plant in an almost desert-like area between Haifa and Acco in Israel, making Frutarom one of Israel's earliest industrial enterprises. In 1952, Frutarom became a subsidiary of the newly established Electrochemical Industries (Frutarom) Ltd (EIF). By 1973 ICC Industries, owned by Dr. John J. Farber, became the controlling party of EIF and Frutarom. Since the 1990s, Frutarom has expanded by establishing itself overseas beginning with the acquisition of a small US company in 1990. Frutarom now has subsidiaries in Israel, the United States, the UK, Switzerland, Russia, Turkey, China, Ukraine, Kazakhstan, Peru and Germany, plus marketing offices in France, Romania, India, and Hong Kong.

In 1996 Frutarom was listed on the Tel Aviv Stock Exchange. The company was formerly known as Frutarom NewCo (1995) Ltd but changed its name to Frutarom Industries Ltd. in 1996.

On 22 February 2005, Frutarom raised approximately US$71 million by listing 10,000,000 global depository receipts on the London Stock Exchange's main market.

On February 5, 2009, New York City Mayor Michael Bloomberg identified a Hudson County Frutarom facility that processes fenugreek seeds as the source of a mysterious maple syrup smell that had periodically filled the city since October 2005. The most recent "maple syrup event" occurred January 29, 2009. While numerous calls were placed to the city's 311 non-emergency complaint hotline on days when the odor was noticed by New Yorkers, the mayor and the New York City Department of Environmental Protection determined that the smell is not harmful.

It was announced in November 2013 that Frutarom would acquire 75% of Russia’s Protein Technologies Ingredients for $50.3 million, with an option to acquire the remaining quarter stake, held by the Cyprus-based firm, Vantodio Holdings, within three years. In May 2015, the company announced it had signed a deal to acquire 95 percent of Investissements BSA, a flavourings producer based in Montreal, for a fee of $35.6 million, as part of its expansion plans into the North American region, as well as India. In August 2016, Frutarom acquired the Irish company Redbrook for 40 million euros.

On May 8, 2018, International Flavors & Fragrances acquired Frutarom for $7.1 billion.

== External ==
- Official website
