= Maple syrup mystery smell =

Late 2000s event in New York City

From 2005 to 2009, residents of New York City sporadically detected a mysterious sweet smell likened to maple syrup in the air, which was subsequently reported on by local blogs as well as The New York Times. The source was eventually found to be a Frutarom Industries Ltd. factory in neighboring New Jersey, which was processing fenugreek seeds, commonly used in maple syrup substitutes. The incidents were alluded to in a 2007 episode of the television show 30 Rock.

== History ==
The smell was first reported on by the blog Gothamist in the fall of 2005 and continued sporadically into early 2009.

Some New Yorkers feared the sweet smell was a form of chemical warfare. The scent was eventually traced to its source, a Frutarom Industries Ltd. factory in northern New Jersey, which was processing fenugreek seeds, commonly used in maple syrup substitutes. This source was traced through a collaborative process between the citizens of New York City, the city's 311 system, the New York City Office of Emergency Management, the New York City Department of Environmental Protection, and a working group which gathered and analyzed atmospheric data.

== Cultural references ==
The incidents were alluded to in an episode of the TV series 30 Rock that aired in 2007 ("Somebody to Love"). The episode begins with multiple characters (Liz, Tracy and Jack) smelling maple syrup. Jack likens the smell to a chemical weapon called "Northrax" that he says smells like maple syrup.
