= Polysantol =

Names
- IUPAC name 3,3-Dimethyl-5-(2,2,3-trimethyl-3-cyclopenten-1-yl)-4-penten-2-ol
- Other names: Mysantol; megasantol; polysanthanol; santol pentenol; polysandalwood alcohol; 3,3-Dimethyl-5-(2,2,3-trimethyl-3-cyclopenten-1-yl; 4-Penten-2-ol-3,3-dimethyl-5-(2,2,3-trimethyl-3-cyclopenten-1-yl); 3,3-dimethyl-5-(2,2,3-trimethylcyclopent-3-en-1-yl)pent-4-en-2-ol; (+/-) trans-3,3-dimethyl-5-(2,2,3-trimethyl-cyclopent-3-en-1-yl)-pent-4-en-2-ol

Identifiers
CAS Number	107898-54-4
3D model (JSmol)	Interactive image
EC Number	600-853-4
PubChem CID	53425103
CompTox Dashboard (EPA)	DTXSID7051551
- InChI: InChI=1S/C15H26O/c1-11-7-8-13(15(11,5)6)9-10-14(3,4)12(2)16/h7,9-10,12-13,16H,8H2,1-6H3 Key: QZFSNJAQFWEXEA-UHFFFAOYSA-N
- SMILES: CC1=CCC(C1(C)C)C=CC(C)(C)C(C)O

Properties
Chemical formula	C_{15}H_{26}O
Molar mass	222.372 g·mol^{−1}
Appearance	colourless liquid
Odor	woody
Density	0.933 g/cm^{3}
Boiling point	300.0 °C (572.0 °F; 573.1 K)
log P	4.33
- Except where otherwise noted, data are given for materials in their standard state (at 25 °C [77 °F], 100 kPa). Infobox references

Polysantol, or, commercially, Mysantol, is a fragrance compound. According to International Flavors & Fragrances Inc., it has a "sandalwood" scent. It is one of the compounds used in counterfeit sandalwood oils.

Some derivatives of polysantol also have a sandalwood scent.
