= Research Institute for Fragrance Materials =

Global scientific institute on fragrance safety

- Abbreviation: RIFM
- Formation: 1966
- Founder: Thomas Parks
- Type: Non-profit
- Purpose: Fragrance safety research
- Headquarters: Mahwah, New Jersey
- President: Anne Marie Api, PhD
- Website: www.rifm.org

The Research Institute for Fragrance Materials (RIFM) is a global non-profit scientific organization dedicated to the systematic assessment of fragrance ingredients to ensure their safe use in consumer products. Founded in 1966, RIFM conducts and evaluates research in toxicology, dermatology, environmental science, and other fields related to fragrance safety. It provides the scientific foundation for the standards of the International Fragrance Association (IFRA).

== History ==
RIFM was established in 1966 by Thomas Parks in response to growing scientific and public interest in the safety of fragrance materials used in consumer products. The Expert Panel for Fragrance Safety, RIFM's independent scientific review board, was formed in 1967. In 1973, RIFM began publishing safety monographs on fragrance ingredients.

== Overview ==
RIFM supports the fragrance industry by developing safety assessments for materials used in personal care products, household products, and cosmetics. These assessments are published in peer-reviewed journals and form the basis for IFRA Standards. As of 2025, over 2,000 fragrance ingredient assessments are publicly accessible via the Fragrance Material Safety Resource Center (FMSRC), an Elsevier-managed platform.

== Structure and Governance ==
RIFM is a 501(c)(3) organization headquartered in New Jersey, governed by a Board of Directors from fragrance industry member companies. The Board does not influence scientific assessments, which are conducted independently and reviewed by an Expert Panel.

== Database ==
Since 1984, RIFM has maintained a proprietary database of over 80,000 references and approximately 200,000 studies on fragrance safety. The database includes toxicology, clinical, regulatory, and environmental data, and is accessible to regulators, researchers, and industry scientists.

== Safety Assessment Methodology ==
=== Assessment Process ===
RIFM’s methodology includes data gathering, quality evaluation, data gap analysis, exposure and risk assessment, peer review, and publication.

=== New Approach Methodologies ===
RIFM uses NAMs—non-animal testing strategies—including in vitro, in silico, PBPK modeling, chemical grouping, and high-throughput screening.

=== Safety Endpoints ===
Seven endpoints are evaluated:

- Genotoxicity
- Repeated dose toxicity
- Reproductive toxicity
- Skin sensitization
- Photoirritation/photoallergenicity
- Respiratory toxicity
- Environmental toxicity

== Expert Panel ==
Established in 1967, the Expert Panel for Fragrance Safety includes scientists in toxicology, dermatology, and related fields. Members rotate regularly and are independent of the fragrance industry.

== Research Programs ==
=== Environmental Research ===
Studies focus on aquatic ecosystems, bioaccumulation, biodegradation, and wastewater monitoring.

=== Human Health Research ===
Clinical studies address skin sensitization and dermal absorption. RIFM pioneered the QRA (Quantitative Risk Assessment) model for allergen safety.

=== Exposure Science ===
RIFM develops realistic exposure models based on consumer habits across product categories.

== Collaborations and Transparency ==
RIFM collaborates with the European Chemicals Agency, FDA, and EPA. It participates in global forums such as the OECD and ICCR. RIFM has published over 1,700 safety assessments covering more than 2,000 ingredients in the peer0reviewed literature.

== Regulatory Impact ==
RIFM science underpins IFRA Standards and is used by regulators such as the EU SCCS and U.S. EPA and FDA. In the United Arab Emirates, manufacturers are required to follow IFRA's regulations regarding banned, restricted, or specified substances, based on RIFM's research.

== Leadership ==
- Thomas Parks, PhD (1966–1970)
- Donald Opdyke, PhD (1970–1983)
- Richard Ford, PhD (1983–1995)
- Emil Pfitzer, PhD (1995–1998)
- Ladd Smith, PhD (1998–2012)
- David K. Wilcox (2012–2015)
- James C. Romine, PhD (2015–2023)
- Anne Marie Api, PhD (2023–present)

== Challenges and Controversies ==
RIFM has faced scrutiny over industry funding. In response, it promotes transparency, peer-reviewed publications, and independent reviews.

Environmental groups have also raised concerns about persistent synthetic musks. RIFM has expanded its research in response.

== Future Directions ==
RIFM is advancing computational toxicology, AI-based hazard prediction, and aggregate exposure assessment.

== See also ==
- International Fragrance Association
- Toxicology
- Perfume
- Personal care
- Environmental toxicology
- Risk assessment
