= Β-Cyclocitral =

β-Cyclocitral

Names
- IUPAC name 2,6,6-Trimethylcyclohexene-1-carbaldehyde
- Other names 1-Formyl-2,6,6-trimethyl-1-cyclohexene

Identifiers
| CAS Number | 432-25-7 |
| 3D model (JSmol) | Interactive image |
| Beilstein Reference | 2042086 |
| ChEBI | CHEBI:53177 |
| ChEMBL | ChEMBL1952257 |
| ChemSpider | 9511 |
| ECHA InfoCard | 100.006.439 |
| EC Number | 207-081-3 |
| PubChem CID | 9895 |
| UNII | 77Y0U2X29G |
| CompTox Dashboard (EPA) | DTXSID7047142 |
- InChI: InChI=1S/C10H16O/c1-8-5-4-6-10(2,3)9(8)7-11/h7H,4-6H2,1-3H3 Key: MOQGCGNUWBPGTQ-UHFFFAOYSA-N
- SMILES: CC1=C(C(CCC1)(C)C)C=O

Properties
| Chemical formula | C_{10}H_{16}O |
| Molar mass | 152.237 g·mol^{−1} |
| Boiling point | 62–63 °C (144–145 °F; 335–336 K) |
| Solubility in water | 86.14 mg/L |

Hazards
- GHS labelling
| Pictograms | (GHS07: Exclamation mark) |
| Signal word | Warning |
| Hazard statements | H302, H312, H315, H319, H332, H335 |
| Precautionary statements | P261, P264, P264+P265, P270, P271, P280, P301+P317, P302+P352, P304+P340, P305+P351+P338, P317, P319, P321, P330, P332+P317, P337+P317, P362+P364, P403+P233, P405, P501 |
- Except where otherwise noted, data are given for materials in their standard state (at 25 °C [77 °F], 100 kPa). Infobox references

β-Cyclocitral (beta-cyclocitral) is an apocarotenoid derived from the C7 oxidation of β-carotene. This apocarotenoid has revived interest due to its roles in plant development. β-cyclocitral has been found endogenously in a variety of organisms including plants, cyanobacteria, fungi and animals. β-Cyclocitral is a volatile compound that contributes to the aroma of various fruits, vegetables and ornamental plants. In plants, β-cyclocitral was found to be an important regulator in root development.

== Application ==
β-Cyclocitral is used as an analytical standard for the determination of volatile organic compounds in saffron due to its analog structure to safranal.

Because β-cyclocitral is associated with cyanobacteria death, it is an analyte that can be tracked in bodies of water to monitor cyanobacteria blooms.

It has also been found to promote the growth of roots in rice, prompting its consideration as a potential agricultural tool.

== Biosynthesis ==
The biosynthesis of β-cyclocitral relies on the formation of β-carotene through the isoprenoid biosynthetic pathway underpinning carotenoid formation. Similar to other apocarotenoids, the formation of β-cyclocitral can occur via the enzymatic and non-enzymatic oxidative cleavage of double bonds in β-carotene. For β-cyclocitral to form, the cleavage of C7-C8 double bonds are needed. While no enzyme has been identified to have high specificity for the production of β-cyclocitral, a carotenoid cleavage dioxygenase (CCD4) has been identified as being capable of cleaving β-carotene at the needed position. 13-lipoxygenase (LOX2) has also been identified to cleave β-carotene at the C7 position. β-cyclocitral can also be formed from the direct oxidation of β-carotene by reactive oxygen species, especially singlet oxygen (^{1}O_{2}). In plants, ^{1}O_{2} is mainly produced from excited chlorophylls in the reaction center of PSII where β-carotene serves to quench the reactive oxygen species.

β-Cyclocitral biosynthesis
