= Sophia Grojsman =

Belarus-born American perfumer (born 1945)

- Сафія Гройсман
- Born: Sophia Piatrouna Khodash; March 8, 1945 (age 81); Lyubcha, Belarusian SSR, Soviet Union (now Belarus)
- Occupation: Perfumer

Sophia Grojsman (Note: Belarusian: Сафія Гройсман, romanized: Sophia Grojsman) (born Sophia Piatrouna Khodash; (Note: Belarusian: Сафія Пятроўна Ходаш, romanized: Safiya Pyatrowna Khodash) March 8, 1945) is a Belarus-born American perfumer. Grojsman is a Vice President of International Flavors and Fragrances, a perfume and scent company.

== Early years and education ==
Sophia Grojsman was born in Lyubcha, Belarusian SSR, Soviet Union (now Belarus). She received a Bachelor of Science degree in analytical chemistry in Poland (Gliwice).

In 1965, Grojsman immigrated to the United States and soon later began to work at International Flavors and Fragrances as a lab technician.

== Honours ==
In 1994, Sophia Grojsman received the Cosmetic Executive Women's Achiever Award for her lifetime contributions to perfumery. She received the Living Legend Award from the American Society of Perfumers in 1996, In 1999 Grojsman was honored by the Cosmetic Executive Women for her lifetime achievements in the fragrance industry. In 2016, Grojsman received the Perfumer of Year, Lifetime Achievement Award by the Fragrance Foundation.

== Creations ==
These are some fragrances that Grojsman has created.

Year	House	Fragrance
1978	Estée Lauder	White Linen
1982	Gloria Vanderbilt	Vanderbilt
1983	Yves Saint Laurent	Paris
1985	Estée Lauder	Beautiful
1987	Prescriptives	Calyx
1988	Calvin Klein	Eternity
1988	Coty, Inc.	Ex'cla-ma'tion
1990	Bill Blass	Nude
1990	Lancôme	Trésor
1991	Estée Lauder	Spellbound
1992	Lalique	Lalique
1992	Oscar De La Renta	Volupté
1992	Perry Ellis	360°
1993	Elizabeth Taylor	Diamonds and Rubies
1993	Yves Saint Laurent	Yvresse
1994	Boucheron	Jaipur
1994	Bvlgari	Bvlgari Pour Femme
1994	Karl Lagerfeld	Sun Moon Stars
1994	Kenzo	Kashaya
1994	Michel Germain	Séxūal
1996	Celine	Magic
1996	Laura Biagiotti	Sotto Voce
1996	Paloma Picasso	Tentations
1999	Christian Lacroix	Christian Lacroix
2000	Yves Rocher	Neblina
2002	Calvin Klein	Eternity Purple Orchid
2002	HRH Princess Elizabeth	E
2002	HRH Princess Elizabeth	Jelisaveta
2003	S-Perfume	100% Love
2003	Yves Saint Laurent	Paris Premieres Roses
2007	Frédéric Malle	Outrageous!
2007	Lancôme	Trésor Sparkling
2009	Yves Saint Laurent	Parisienne
2012	IVS Elite Group	Désir Coulant
