= Bornafix =

Names
- IUPAC name 2-Methyl-3-[[(1S,2R,4S)-1,7,7-trimethyl-2-bicyclo[2.2.1]heptanyl]oxy]propan-1-ol
- Other names Woody propanol

Identifiers
| CAS Number | 916676-29-4 |
| 3D model (JSmol) | Interactive image |
| PubChem CID | 154926039 |
| UNII | GZ7ZFZ1ZUT |
- InChI: InChI=1S/C14H26O2/c1-10(8-15)9-16-12-7-11-5-6-14(12,4)13(11,2)3/h10-12,15H,5-9H2,1-4H3/t10?,11-,12+,14+/m0/s1 Key: YCOHHRPARVZBHK-JOEFCEOISA-N
- SMILES: CC(CO)CO[C@@H]1C[C@@H]2CC[C@]1(C2(C)C)C

Properties
| Chemical formula | C_{14}H_{26}O_{2} |
| Molar mass | 226.360 g·mol^{−1} |
- Except where otherwise noted, data are given for materials in their standard state (at 25 °C [77 °F], 100 kPa). Infobox references

Bornafix is a fragrance compound with the molecular formula C_{14}H_{26}O_{2}. According to International Flavors & Fragrances Inc., it has a "warm woody, dry amber, (and) cedarwood" scent. It has also been described to have a "warm, woody, dry, amber, powdery" scent.

== See also ==
- list of fragrance compounds
