= Estée (fragrance) =

1968 perfume by Estée Lauder Companies

Fragrance by Estée Lauder Companies
- Category: Floral
- Designed for: Women
- Top notes: Primarily aldehydes
- Heart notes: Primarily carnation, coriander, and raspberry
- Base notes: Primarily musk and tree moss
- Released: 1968
- Label: Estée Lauder Companies
- Perfumer(s): Bethy Bussé
- Tagline: "Estee is the first super perfume. And only one woman could have created it."
- Flanker(s): Very Estée (2012)
- Successor: Estée Legacy (2024)

Estée is a bright floral fragrance that was released in 1968 by Estée Lauder. It was marketed as the first "super" perfume because it had three times more essential oils than other perfumes of the time, and the high concentration gave it longevity. The fragrance came in different strengths but each had the word "super":

- Super Perfume (pure perfume/extrait)
- Super Cologne Spray (sometimes sold as Super Eau de Parfum)

== The marketing of "Super" ==
"Super" was not a new classification in the fragrance industry. It was a brand and marketing term used to indicate that the products had a higher oil concentration than standard European ones within the same type. There are three general classifications of fragrance for women:

- Perfume: 15% to 30% perfume concentrate, mixed with 96° alcohol for a carrier; lasts on skin for about 4 hours
- Eau de Toilette: 5% to 15% perfume concentrate, mixed with 80° or 90° alcohol; lasts on skin for about 2 hours
- Eau de Cologne: 2% to 10% perfume concentrate, mixed with 50° to 75° alcohol; sometimes concentrate has additional citrus notes. Blakely notes that when the concentrate approaches 10% in this category (which is more common in American fragrances), it may be named "concentrated cologne" or "super cologne", however whether "super cologne" existed as an informal trade term before Estée was released, or whether Estée's own naming later became genericized as informal trade language is unclear.

Articles and advertisements announcing the launch of Estée Super Perfume explained that it has "three to five times the lasting power" or that it "lasts three times longer" than other perfumes sold at the time. Super Perfume and Super Cologne were sold at the same time, both touted as having three times the oils or longevity as fragrances in the perfume or cologne categories.

== Fragrance ==
Bethy Bussé (also spelled Betty Busse) at International Flavors & Fragrances created this fragrance with guidance from their chief perfumer, Ernest Shiftan. Lauder had been inspired by seeing light reflected off glasses of champagne under crystal chandeliers, and requested a fragrance that would match that image. Frambinone gives a synthetic raspberry note in a raspberry, rose, and carnation accord; the carnation is evident in the top notes, but remains through the drydown. Bussé added a high concentration of aldehydes, and macrocyclic musks for some of the base notes. Benzyl salicylate gives a diffusing effect for the floral bouquet.

The fragrance has sparkling, floral top notes; floral middle notes; and powdery, woody base notes:

Top notes
Primarily aldehydes; also bergamot, lily of the valley, and peach
Middle notes
Primarily carnation, coriander, and raspberry; also honey, jasmine, iris, lilac, Moroccan rose, tuberose, violet, and ylang-ylang
Base notes
Primarily musk and tree moss; also cedarwood, sandalwood, and styrax

== Fragrance line extensions ==
- Very Estée (2012)
- Estée Legacy (2024): The Legacy Collection is five Lauder fragrances that were reinterpreted by Frédéric Malle and a team of perfumers at IFF including Anne Flipo, Carlos Benaïm, and Bruno Jovanovic
