= Youth-Dew =

1953 perfume by Estée Lauder Companies

Fragrance by Estée Lauder Companies
- Category: Amber
- Designed for: Women
- Top notes: Aldehydes, bergamot, chamomile, rose, jonquil, lavender, orange, peach, and spices
- Heart notes: Primarily eugenol
- Base notes: Primarily benzoin and patchouli
- Released: 1953
- Label: Estée Lauder Companies
- Perfumer(s): Joséphine Catapano
- Tagline: "Romance begins at bath time"
- Flanker(s): Soft Youth Dew (1977); Cinnabar (1978); Youth-Dew Amber Nude (2005)

Youth-Dew (also written Youth Dew) is a powdery amber fragrance that was released in 1953 by Estée Lauder. It began as a perfumed bath oil in the Estoderme toiletry line.

At the time, American women didn't buy fragrances for themselves, but they would buy toiletries like bath oil and a highly fragrant bath oil functioned like a long-lasting perfume.

== Fragrance ==
Joséphine Catapano at International Flavors & Fragrances created this fragrance. She used a high percentage (30%) of essential oils to make it very long-lasting, and mixed the perfume oil with isopropyl myristate instead of water so it would float on the surface of bath water.

Calkin and Jellinek distinguish two lineages within fragrances that are classified as "amber" (formerly "oriental"): an ambreine accord, associated with Guerlain Shalimar (1925) and its descendants, and a mellis accord, from which Youth-Dew and its stylistic successors Yves Saint Laurent Opium (1977) and Chanel Coco (1984) evolved. Youth-Dew's mellis (or, "honey") accord combines coumarin (for hay-like sweetness), eugenol (for clove spice), and benzyl salicylate (for balsamic notes) gives the fragrance its underlying structure, in combination with patchouli (an earthy woody scent), cedryl acetate (a powdery cedar scent), and hydroxycitronellal (a fresh lily-of-the-valley note). Amyl salicylate, cedryl acetate and nitromusks were also characteristic of 1950s perfumery materials, as exemplified by Youth-Dew.

The fragrance has spicy, citrus top notes; spicy, floral middle notes; and warm base notes:

- Top notes: Aldehydes, bergamot, chamomile, Bulgarian rose, jonquil, lavender, orange, peach, and spices
- Middle notes: Primarily the carnation/clove scent of eugenol; also cassie, cinnamon, geranium, jasmine, and lily of the valley
- Base notes: Primarily benzoin and patchouli; also labdanum, musk, oakmoss, Tolu balsam, sandalwood, vanillin, and vetiver

== Relationship with International Flavors & Fragrances ==
Lauder and International Flavors & Fragrances (IFF) has a strong partnership, and IFF (or its predecessors) created all the Estée Lauder fragrances from the first, Youth-Dew, until Knowing (1995), and IFF continues to create fragrances for them.

Lauder became friends with Arnold Lewis (A.L.) van Ameringen in about 1940, before her company had really taken off and when he was president of a fragrance house whose largest account was Chanel. Reportedly, van Ameringen's company extended Lauder credit and other small help during these early, leaner years. Dr. Herman (Jerry) Amsterdam (1905–1966) worked at van Ameringen-Haebler and created Estoderme Youth-Dew Creme while working there.

When Lauder wanted to add a fragrance to the Estoderme Youth-Dew Creme line, naturally van Ameringen's company was involved: Joséphine Catapano created the fragrance. Ernest Shiftan (1903–1976) was a chief perfumer at IFF for many years. Perfumer and author Victoria Belim notes that many sources name Shiftan as a co-creator of Estee Lauder's Youth-Dew and White Linen but that this is incorrect: Shiftan was a vice-president at IFF, so his name was automatically attached to fragrances created at that time.

Five years after Youth-Dew launched, van Ameringen's company merged with another fragrance house, and together they became IFF.

== Pricing and marketing strategy ==
Youth-Dew was a financially strategic offering. At a counter that sold fragrances, skincare, and makeup, fragrances carried the highest gross profit margin, and a customer who came to buy the fragrance could be cross-sold other Estée Lauder items.

With only $50,000 budgeted for advertising—far less than competitors such as Revlon, which spent $22 million that year—Lauder relied on several novel, low-cost marketing tactics instead. Customers received free samples; some stores enclosed scented blotters with customers' monthly bills; when a new counter opened, a local news reporter would be invited to receive a free makeover or product to try; and free samples eventually evolved into the gift-with-purchase model (Youth-Dew was free with the purchase of a less-popular item).

The product itself reinforced this strategy: bottles were left unsealed, so at the counter women could smell the oil, and its scent would linger on their hands. The bath oil offered a high concentration of fragrance at a low price point, in a format that had a higher consumption rate than perfume. It sold for substantially less than prestige fragrances: $5 per bottle, compared with Rochas Femme (1944) at $40 per ounce (equivalent to $63 and $500, respectively, in 2026).

Youth-Dew proved foundational to the growth of Estée Lauder's other products, and of the company itself.

== Marketing war with Yves Saint Laurent ==
In July 1977, Yves Saint Laurent (YSL) released his "Les Chinoises" haute couture collection in Paris. In October, YSL released Opium in Paris to coincide with the collection. Opium is so similar to Youth-Dew that Lauder considered suing Yves Saint Laurent and Roure, later saying in an interview, "When I saw Opium, I almost passed out.... Opium is my Youth-Dew but with a tassel." By November 1977, advertisements for a subtler flanker, Soft Youth Dew, were published in newspapers.

In mid-August 1978, Lauder announced a new fragrance named Cinnabar would be launched the next month. The company gave various comments: Estée said she began working on Cinnabar in 1976; Ronald Lauder (vice president of marketing and sales) said Cinnabar was a Youth-Dew product available in new packaging for Christmas in response to Estee's new interest in Chinese laquerware. In September 1978, YSL launched Opium in the US, with a lavish party in New York City, and Estée Lauder launched Cinnabar. Cinnabar was launched so quickly that there were problems getting bottles for the fragrance, so some Cinnabar was sold in bottles with Soft Youth-Dew printed on them.

By October 1978, they advertised Cinnabar as 'The 1980s version of Soft Youth Dew'. When asked about customer confusion over Soft Youth-Dew and Cinnabar, they explained that they would wait to see how each performed during the Christmas sales season before making any decision about the two similar fragrances.

Opium was built on the same mellis-accord skeleton as Youth-Dew, but at a higher concentration: Calkin and Jellinek's breakdown of the formula puts benzyl salicylate at around 12%, hydroxycitronellal around 10%, patchouli around 8%, and coumarin around 2.5%. To that base, Opium added a developed rose complex and an aldehydic note not present in Youth-Dew, giving it a brighter, more resinous character overall.

== Fragrance line extensions ==
- Soft Youth Dew (1977)
- Cinnabar (1978): Often compared with Yves Saint Laurent Opium (1977), but perfume historian Octavian Sever Coifan names this as a Youth-Dew flanker.
- Youth-Dew Amber Nude (2005): Designed by Tom Ford as a softer and sweeter reinterpretation of the original.
