= Well Living Lab =

- Motto: Indoor Health Begins Here
- Established: 2014; 12 years ago
- Field of research: Health, Wellness, Design, Real Estate, Technology
- Director: Barbara Spurrier, MHA
- Location: Rochester, Minnesota, Minnesota, United States
- Affiliations: Mayo Clinic, Delos Living
- Website: welllivinglab.com

The Well Living Lab is a scientific research center that uses exclusively human-centered research to understand the interaction between health and well-being and indoor environments. Its design incorporates a large degree of control over research variables through a modular, reconfigurable space that simulates real-world environments. The Well Living Lab was founded a collaboration between real estate firm Delos Living LLC and Mayo Clinic. It is located in Rochester, Minnesota.

== History ==
The Well Living Lab was first announced on September 9, 2014, at Mayo Clinic's Transform 2014 conference. The official launch of the Well Living Lab occurred on September 30, 2015, at Mayo Clinic's Transform 2015 conference.

== Lab Facility and Capabilities ==
The Well Living Lab comprises 5,500 square feet of research space that is designed to accurately simulate real-world environments while also being embedded with a wide array of environmental and biometric sensors. The lab's facility is also highly modular, allowing for rapid reconfiguration between studies. This allows researchers to specify exactly the environment they wish to study. The lab's control center is designed to allow researchers to view and analyze data in real time during a study and to conduct real time analytics.

== Research Agenda ==
The Well Living Lab's research agenda is focused on studying the effect that buildings, and the things in them, have on human health. This will include environmental factors such as lighting, temperature, air quality, furniture, design, and more. Health outcomes that the lab will study include sleep quality, productivity, stress levels, cardiovascular health, and more. Mayo Clinic researchers from many disciplines will serve as the principal investigators in these studies. Researchers intend to combine environmental sensors, wearable and other biometric sensors, as well as observation.
