= Private Collection (fragrance) =

1973 fragrance

Fragrance by Estée Lauder Companies
- Category: Green Floral
- Designed for: Women
- Top notes: Primarily jasmine
- Heart notes: Primarily Bulgarian rose and galbanum
- Base notes: Primarily patchouli and musk
- Released: 1973
- Perfumer(s): Vincent Marcello
- Tagline: "A rare and precious fragrance worn only by Estée Lauder herself, until now."
- Flanker(s): Private Collection Tuberose Gardenia (2007); Private Collection Amber Ylang Ylang (2008); Private Collection Jasmine White Moss (2009)
- Successor: Private Collection Legacy (2024)

Private Collection is a green floral fragrance that was released in 1973 by Estée Lauder. It was positioned as a fragrance made of the most expensive ingredients.

== Marketing ==
While Estée (1968) was named after Lauder, giving the mass-prestige fragrance an instant brand identity, Private Collection was marketed as an elite and bespoke fragrance. As Lauder told it, she personally worked for years on a fragrance with rare oils, extracts, and essences. When people asked what she was wearing, she would say it was from her "private collection". She shared a few bottles with Princess Grace of Monaco before it was manufactured for sale. Eventually people began calling department stores asking for the Private Collection perfume, and Lauder gave into popular demand for a public release. It was launched at a higher price point ($70 per ounce, equivalent to $526 in 2026) and its packaging looked like her personal stationery. This marketing approach came on the heels of Chanel No. 19 (1970), which was marketed as Coco Chanel's personal fragrance (although this was unlikely because it was created only a year before she died). It also used galbanum for green notes.

== Fragrance ==
Vincent Marcello at International Flavors & Fragrances (IFF) created this fragrance, and his wife wore it before Lauder began selling it. His mentor and manager, Ernest Shiftan, challenged the team at IFF to modernize Guerlain Vol de Nuit (1933). Shiftan wanted clear green notes and an amber drydown. Marcello won the challenge by increased the green notes with galbanum oil for a top note of sliced green stems and crushed grass, and galbanum resinoid (a thicker fixative) with amber, sandalwood, and musk for base notes.

The fragrance has green, floral top notes; spicy, floral middle notes; and musky, woody base notes:

Top notes
Primarily jasmine; also bergamot, clary sage, green notes, honeysuckle, and hyacinth
Middle notes
Primarily Bulgarian rose and galbanum; also coriander, orange blossom, and ylang-ylang
Base notes
Primarily patchouli and musk; also amber, oakmoss, and sandalwood

Frederic Malle Synthetic Nature (2024), formerly named Synthetic Jungle (2021), was influenced by Private Collection and No. 19.

== Fragrance line extensions ==
- Private Collection Tuberose Gardenia (2007)
- Private Collection Amber Ylang Ylang (2008)
- Private Collection Jasmine White Moss (2009)
- Private Collection Legacy (2024): The Legacy Collection is five Lauder fragrances that were reinterpreted by Frédéric Malle and a team of perfumers at IFF including Anne Flipo, Carlos Benaïm, and Bruno Jovanovic
