= Cetalor =

Names
- IUPAC name 3a,6,6,9a-Tetramethyl-2,4,5,5a,7,8,9,9b-octahydro-1H-benzo[e][1]benzofuran
- Other names Amber naphthofuran

Identifiers
CAS Number	3738-00-9
3D model (JSmol)	Interactive image
ChEBI	CHEBI:171882
ChEMBL	ChEMBL3728760
ChemSpider	96437
EC Number	223-118-6
PubChem CID	107166
UNII	K60YJF1E9A
CompTox Dashboard (EPA)	DTXSID2048119
- InChI: InChI=1S/C16H28O/c1-14(2)8-5-9-15(3)12(14)6-10-16(4)13(15)7-11-17-16/h12-13H,5-11H2,1-4H3 Key: YPZUZOLGGMJZJO-UHFFFAOYSA-N
- SMILES: CC1(CCCC2(C1CCC3(C2CCO3)C)C)C

Properties
Chemical formula	C_{16}H_{28}O
Molar mass	236.399 g·mol^{−1}
- Except where otherwise noted, data are given for materials in their standard state (at 25 °C [77 °F], 100 kPa). Infobox references

Cetalor is a fragrance compound with the molecular formula C_{16}H_{28}O. According to International Flavors & Fragrances Inc., it has an "ambergris, powerful amber, (and) woody" scent. It has also been described to have a "dry, woody, amber, ambergris, musk(y), (and) sweet" scent.

== See also ==
- List of fragrance compounds
