= 8,9-Epoxycedrane =

Names
- IUPAC name Andrane
- Other names: octahydro-3,6,6,7a-tetramethyl-2H-2a,7-Methanoazuleno[5,6-b]oxirene; 2,6,6,8-tetramethyl-9-oxatetracyclo[5.4.1.0^{1,5}.0^{8,10}]dodecane; α-Cedrene epoxide

Identifiers
CAS Number	29597-36-2
3D model (JSmol)	Interactive image
ChEBI	CHEBI:167349
ChemSpider	109230
ECHA InfoCard	100.045.183
EC Number	249-717-2
PubChem CID	122510
CompTox Dashboard (EPA)	DTXSID30860119
- InChI: InChI=1S/C15H24O/c1-9-5-6-10-13(2,3)11-7-15(9,10)8-12-14(11,4)16-12/h9-12H,5-8H2,1-4H3 Key: HZRFVTRTTXBHSE-UHFFFAOYSA-N
- SMILES: CC1CCC2C13CC(C2(C)C)C4(C(C3)O4)C

Properties
Chemical formula	C_{15}H_{24}O
Molar mass	220.356 g·mol^{−1}
Odor	woody
- Except where otherwise noted, data are given for materials in their standard state (at 25 °C [77 °F], 100 kPa). Infobox references

8,9-Epoxycedrane (also called Andrane) is a fragrance compound. According to International Flavors & Fragrances Inc., it has a woody, ambergris, tobacco, cedarwood, and sandalwood odor.
