= Citronellyl propionate =

Names
- IUPAC name 3,7-dimethyloct-6-enyl propanoate

Identifiers
CAS Number	141-14-0
3D model (JSmol)	Interactive image
ChEBI	CHEBI:171788
ChEMBL	ChEMBL3185956
ChemSpider	8502
ECHA InfoCard	100.004.966
EC Number	205-461-3
PubChem CID	8834
UNII	87R1092U7J
CompTox Dashboard (EPA)	DTXSID8047187
- InChI: InChI=1S/C13H24O2/c1-5-13(14)15-10-9-12(4)8-6-7-11(2)3/h7,12H,5-6,8-10H2,1-4H3 Key: POPNTVRHTZDEBW-UHFFFAOYSA-N
- SMILES: CCC(=O)OCCC(C)CCC=C(C)C

Properties
Chemical formula	C_{13}H_{24}O_{2}
Molar mass	212.333 g·mol^{−1}
Appearance	colorless
Odor	fruity-rosy
Density	0.895 g/cm^{3}
Boiling point	242 °C (468 °F; 515 K)
Solubility in water	insoluble
Solubility	miscible with alcohol, most fixed oils
Refractive index (n_{D})	1.443-1.449
- Except where otherwise noted, data are given for materials in their standard state (at 25 °C [77 °F], 100 kPa). Infobox references

Citronellyl propionate is a synthetically made and naturally occurring organic compound from the group of the unsaturated esters. Citronellyl propionate occurs naturally, for example, in tomatoes.

== Properties ==
At room temperature, citronellyl propionate is a colorless liquid with a sweet, fruity or rose-like odor. It tastes like plums. The compound is practically insoluble in water, but is soluble in ethanol, among other solvents.

== Synthesis ==
Citronellyl propionate is produced by the esterification reaction between citronellol and propanoic acid.

== Usage ==
Citronellyl propionate is used as an ingredient in floral fragrances and cleaning products. It can also be used as a flavoring agent.
