= Geranyl formate =

Names
- IUPAC name Geranyl formate

Identifiers
CAS Number	105-86-2
3D model (JSmol)	Interactive image
ChEBI	CHEBI:31648
ChEMBL	ChEMBL3182514
ChemSpider	4445318
ECHA InfoCard	100.003.037
EC Number	203-339-4
KEGG	C12294
PubChem CID	5282109
UNII	72O586X6ZI
CompTox Dashboard (EPA)	DTXSID0047614
- InChI: InChI=1S/C11H18O2/c1-10(2)5-4-6-11(3)7-8-13-9-12/h5,7,9H,4,6,8H2,1-3H3/b11-7+ Key: FQMZVFJYMPNUCT-YRNVUSSQSA-N
- SMILES: CC(=CCC/C(=C/COC=O)/C)C

Properties
Chemical formula	C_{11}H_{18}O_{2}
Molar mass	182.263 g·mol^{−1}
Appearance	colorless to pale yellow
Density	0.906-0.920 g/cm^{3}
Boiling point	216 °C (421 °F; 489 K)
Solubility in water	insoluble
Solubility	soluble in alcohol, most fixed oils insoluble in glycerol, propylene glycol
Refractive index (n_{D})	1.457-1.466

Hazards
- GHS labelling
Pictograms	(GHS07: Exclamation mark)
Signal word	Warning
Hazard statements	H317
Precautionary statements	P261, P272, P280, P302+P352, P321, P333+P317, P362+P364, P501
- Except where otherwise noted, data are given for materials in their standard state (at 25 °C [77 °F], 100 kPa). Infobox references

Geranyl formate is an organic compound from the group of terpenoid esters, derived from geraniol and formic acid.

== Presence ==
Geranyl formate is found in geranium oil from Pelargonium graveolens. The proportion varies depending on the source; in one study, the content in the essential oil ranged from less than 1% to almost 9%, with an average of about 5%. In another study, the content was between 4.1% and 4.7%. In a third study, the composition of geranium oil was determined depending on the harvest time. In this case, the proportion of geranyl formate varied between 3.8% and 6.2%. It is also found in annatto seeds and is also produced during the autoxidation of geraniol.

== Usage ==
Geranyl formate is approved in the European Union under FL number 09.076 as a general food flavoring. Geranyl formate is also used as a fragrance. As of 2024, the worldwide usage in this area is in the range of 10 to 100 tonnes per year.
