= Phenylisohexanol =

Names
- IUPAC name 3-methyl-5-phenylpentan-1-ol
- Other names: Phenoxanol; Mefrosol; Phenoxanol; Phenylhexanol

Identifiers
CAS Number	55066-48-3
3D model (JSmol)	Interactive image
ChEMBL	ChEMBL3185293
ChemSpider	97376
ECHA InfoCard	100.054.038
EC Number	259-461-3
PubChem CID	108312
UNII	M56178H183
CompTox Dashboard (EPA)	DTXSID4044822
- InChI: InChI=1S/C12H18O/c1-11(9-10-13)7-8-12-5-3-2-4-6-12/h2-6,11,13H,7-10H2,1H3 Key: OXYRENDGHPGWKV-UHFFFAOYSA-N
- SMILES: CC(CCC1=CC=CC=C1)CCO

Properties
Chemical formula	C_{12}H_{18}O
Molar mass	178.275 g·mol^{−1}
Density	0.955-0.963 g/cm^{3}
Boiling point	260–261 °C (500–502 °F; 533–534 K)

Hazards
- GHS labelling
Pictograms	(GHS05: Corrosive) (GHS07: Exclamation mark)
Signal word	Danger
Hazard statements	H302, H318
Precautionary statements	P264, P264+P265, P270, P280, P301+P317, P305+P354+P338, P317, P330, P501
- Except where otherwise noted, data are given for materials in their standard state (at 25 °C [77 °F], 100 kPa). Infobox references

Phenylisohexanol is a synthetically made organic compound, used as a rose smell fragrance at industrial scale. The substance is also known under the brand names: phenoxanol (International Flavors & Fragrances), mefrosol (Givaudan, formerly Quest International), and phenylhexanol (Firmenich).

== Properties ==
Phenylisohexanol occurs as a clear, colorless to light yellow liquid and has a fresh rose oil scent that lingers long after use. Phenylisohexanol is a primary alkyl aryl alcohol and is chemically related to citronellol. However, the isobutenyl group from citronellol is replaced by a phenyl group. The odor detection threshold of phenylisohexanol is approximately 0.8 µg/m³, ten times lower than that of citronellol.

== Synthesis ==
The starting materials for the synthesis of phenylisohexanol are isoprene and benzaldehyde. The oxo-Diels–Alder reaction between the two components forms 2-phenyl-4-methyl-3,6-dihydropyrane (CAS number 60335-71-9), also known as rosyran. Ring opening by hydrogenolysis in acidic center of the dihydropyrane ring yields racemic phenylisohexanol.

The commercial product is a racemic mixture of the two stereoisomers, (R)-(+)- and (S)-(-)-phenylisohexanol. With asymmetric synthesis, it is possible to produce the R- or S- isomer separately.

== Usage ==
Phenylisohexanol is used in cosmetics, perfumes, and deodorants, among other applications.
