= David Michael & Co. =

- Type: Private
- Industry: Food Development
- Founder: David Michael and Herman Hertz
- Headquarters: Philadelphia, Pennsylvania, United States
- Area served: Worldwide
- Products: Custom Food Flavors; Organic Flavors; Flavor Modifiers; Texture Modifiers
- Number of employees: 250
- Website: www.dmflavors.com

David Michael & Co. is an American food flavor company. It produces more than 40,000 flavors, stabilizers and natural colors for customers worldwide. Founded and based in Philadelphia, the company has facilities in Illinois and California, as well as operations in Mexico, France and China.

== History ==
David Michael & Co. was started in 1896 by Herman Hertz (an Atlantic City bar owner) and David Michael (a salesman for the Fleer Chewing Gum Company), in Philadelphia, Pennsylvania.

Contemporaneously, brothers Eli and Robert Rosenbaum, with Walter Rosskam, formed the R&R Chemical Company, which made cigar wrappers and cigar binding fluids.

In 1920, they approached the David Michael company to purchase some gums for their cigar wrapping base. David Michael had developed a product called “Michael’s Mixevan,” a vanilla powder to sell to the ice cream industry. David Michael proposed that he, Rosskam and the Rosenbaums become partners.

Michael died in 1935, and ownership of David Michael & Co. passed to Rosskam and the Rosenbaum brothers. Throughout the 20th Century, the company expanded its product line, moved from Center City Philadelphia to the city’s Northeast, and opened operations overseas.

After World War II, Walter Rosskam's sons George and Bill completed their military service and joined the business. George focused on operations, and Bill on sales; both became Vice Presidents. Robert's son Edward joined after college; he would later became President, and eventually Chairman.

David Michael & Co. remained a family-owned business, with members of the Rosskam and Rosenbaum families in control of operations until 2016, when no one in the fourth generation of the families was interested in continuing the company and the third generation decided it was time to sell.

The last original Rosskam descendants to run David Michael & Co. were Skip Rosskam (President and Chief Operations Officer), George Rosskam (Executive Vice President, Operations), Stuart Rosenbaum (Executive Vice President and Chief Information Officer), and Steve Rosskam (Executive Vice President).

== Successor company ==
David Michael & Co.was privately owned and led by two families and their descendants from its founding until its sale to International Flavors & Fragrances in 2016. IFF also acquired Ottens Flavors at about the same time (also a Philadelphia-based company) which they then merged with David, Michael & Company to create a new division called Tastepoint by IFF.

== Brands & innovations ==
David Michael & Co.'s first product, Old Time Body and Age, is a flavor used to give an aged, mellow taste to newly distilled whiskey. Developed in 1896, this product is still being sold today.

In 1965, the company developed Vanguard, a mix smoothener originally created in response to a worldwide vanilla shortage.

In 1971, they developed Butter Plus, a natural liquid replacement for butter. One pound of butter plus equals 50 pounds of actual butter.

In 2003, David Michael & Co. launched both Cocoa-Mate and Honey-Mate, designed to offer savings in times of high cocoa or honey prices.

The company’s other brands included Biovan, Supervan, DMChoice, Mixevan, Michtex, MichaelLite and Michaelcap.
