= Galaxolide =

Chemical compound

Names
- IUPAC name 4,6,6,7,8,8-Hexamethyl-1,3,4,6,7,8-hexahydrocyclopenta[g]isochromene
- Other names Hexahydrohexamethyl cyclopentabenzopyran Hexamethylindanopyran; HHCB

Identifiers
CAS Number	1222-05-5
3D model (JSmol)	Interactive image
ChEBI	CHEBI:83784
ChemSpider	82618
ECHA InfoCard	100.013.588
EC Number	214-946-9
PubChem CID	91497
UNII	14170060AT
CompTox Dashboard (EPA)	DTXSID8027373
- InChI: InChI=1S/C18H26O/c1-11-9-19-10-13-7-15-16(8-14(11)13)18(5,6)12(2)17(15,3)4/h7-8,11-12H,9-10H2,1-6H3 Key: ONKNPOPIGWHAQC-UHFFFAOYSA-N; InChI=1/C18H26O/c1-11-9-19-10-13-7-15-16(8-14(11)13)18(5,6)12(2)17(15,3)4/h7-8,11-12H,9-10H2,1-6H3 Key: ONKNPOPIGWHAQC-UHFFFAOYAG
- SMILES: O3Cc1c(cc2c(c1)C(C)(C)C(C2(C)C)C)C(C3)C

Properties
Chemical formula	C_{18}H_{26}O
Molar mass	258.405 g·mol^{−1}
Density	1.0054 g/cm^{3}
Boiling point	304 °C (579 °F; 577 K)

Hazards
- GHS labelling
Pictograms	(GHS09: Environmental hazard)
Signal word	Warning
Hazard statements	H410
Precautionary statements	P273, P391, P501
- Except where otherwise noted, data are given for materials in their standard state (at 25 °C [77 °F], 100 kPa). Infobox references

Galaxolide (trade name; also known as Abbalide, Pearlide, Astrolide, Musk 50, Polarlide; chemical name 1,3,4,6,7,8-hexahydro-4,6,6,7,8,8,-hexamethyl-cyclopenta[g]benzopyran or HHCB, hexamethylindanopyran) is a synthetic musk with a clean sweet musky floral woody odor used in fragrances. It is one of the musk components that perfume and cologne manufacturers use to add a musk odor to their products. Galaxolide was first synthesized in 1956, and used in the late 1960s in some fabric softeners and detergents. High concentrations were also incorporated in fine fragrances.

== Chemistry ==
Galaxolide is the trade name from International Flavors & Fragrances (IFF) for the fragrance material with CAS Registry Number 1222-05-5 and CAS chemical name 1,3,4,6,7,8-hexahydro-4,6,6,7,8,8-hexamethyl-cyclopenta[g]-2-benzopyran.

Galaxolide is also known by its IUPAC name 4,6,6,7,8,8-hexamethyl-1,3,4,6,7,8-hexahydro-cyclopenta[g]-isochromene and the more commonly used acronym of the chemical name 1,3,4,6,7,8-hexahydro-4,6,6,7,8,8,-hexamethyl-cyclopenta[g]benzopyran (HHCB). The abbreviation for this chemical name, HHCB, is commonly used for galaxolide in various publications. Galaxolide may also be known as hexamethylindanopyran under the International Nomenclature of Cosmetic Ingredients (INCI).

== Physical-chemical properties ==
Galaxolide is a mixture of isomers. It has chiral centers at carbon atom 4 and 7. The isomers are (4R,7R), (4R,7S), (4S,7S) and (4S, 7R). Galaxolide has a molecular formula of C_{18}H_{26}O and a molecular weight of 258.4 g/mol. At room temperature, it occurs as a highly viscous liquid. Its melting point is -20 °C and its boiling point is estimated to be 330 °C based on a boiling point of 160 °C at 4 hPa.

== History ==
Galaxolide was discovered at IFF in the 1960s, by Heeringa and Beets.

It was first synthesized in 1965 and its discovery was mainly due to the work by Beets on the osmophoric group of the polycyclic musks, where they tried to improve existing synthetic musks by making them more stable and hydrophobic.

== Odor ==
Galaxolide has become the key synthetic musk ingredient belonging to the polycyclic musk group as defined by the International Fragrance Association (IFRA). Its odor is described as a “clean”, sweet, floral, woody musk. Galaxolide is a mixture of stereoisomers and research has shown that it is in particular the (4S,7R) and (4S, 7S) forms that are the most powerful musk notes, with odor thresholds of 1 ng/L or less.

== Environmental data ==
Galaxolide has a measured bioconcentration factor (BCF) in fish in a range of 600-1600 and a log octanol-water partition coefficient (Log K_{ow}) of around 5.5 (5.3 – 5.9).

Given its lack of bioaccumulation and toxicity, the EU determined that galaxolide does not meet the criteria for being a substance classified as Persistent, Bioaccumulative and Toxic (PBT) to the environment. However, the EPA's assessment of galaxolide found it to be moderately persistent and bioaccumulative and highly toxic to aquatic organisms. The EPA's PBT Profiler also finds Galaxolide to exceed the EPA's criteria as a PBT.

Galaxolide degrades in the environment to primary degradants with log K_{ow} < 4 and further to more hydrophilic products with log K_{ow} of < 1.

Galaxolide is classified as H410: "Very toxic to aquatic life with long lasting effects." under EU CLP classification rules.

Although there have been reports of galaxolide in environmental compartments, these studies have been made part of galaxolide's environmental safety reviews by various authorities, who have deemed that there is no need for risk reduction measures.

Galaxolide contamination has been detected in the Great Lakes. In a study of lake sediment in Lake Erie found galaxolide levels to be doubling every 8–16 years, raising question of its bioaccumulative properties. Galaxolide was detected in 92% of water samples from Lake Michigan.

In 2015 a GreenScreen for Safer Chemicals assessment of Galaxolide assigned Galaxolide a score of Benchmark 1. Benchmark 1 is assigned to chemicals of highest concern whose use is recommended to be avoided. Specifically, the GreenScreen assigned the Benchmark 1 score due to Galaxolide's high persistent, bioaccumulative and aquatic toxicity properties.

Galaxolide has been shown to be removed by ozonation in wastewaters treatment plants. Yet, studies show, it is commonly detected in rivers, drinking water, lake sediment and fish tissue.

== Human health ==
Galaxolide is not an irritant, not toxic, not a CMR substance nor a sensitizer. Based on test data, the EU Scientific Committee for Consumer Safety included galaxolide in their proposal for extending the allergen information on cosmetic products as it claims to have seen only up to 100 individual cases worldwide in the last several decades who have reported irritation or allergic reactions to galaxolide through the use of cosmetic products.

Galaxolide has been reported to be found in human biomonitoring studies and its presence in human tissue has been evaluated by several scientific authorities. For example, Galaxolide was detected in 97% of breast milk samples in mothers from Massachusetts in a 2004 study. A 2009 study detected Galaxolide in the blood plasma of 91% of the study participants.

Extensive investigations into the presence of galaxolide in biomonitoring studies, have been completed and evaluated by various regulatory authorities. The outcome of all those studies is that galaxolide is safe for use in consumer products.

== Regulatory and safety status ==
In 2002, The Scientific Committee on Cosmetics and Non-Food Products (SCCNFP), the expert scientific board that advises the European Commission on human health issues, reviewed the human safety of galaxolide, when used in cosmetic products, and issued a final opinion on 17 September 2002. The SCCNFP stated that "...HHCB [galaxolide] can be safely used as a fragrance ingredient in cosmetic products without any restriction for its use."

In March 2003, the European Chemicals Bureau (ECB) concluded that galaxolide is not a persistent, bioaccumulative and toxic substance (PBT) according to the ECB criteria and removed galaxolide from their draft list of PBTs.

Under the EU Existing Substances Directive, galaxolide is listed in the 4th Priority List of Substances for review by the EU. This Priority List was the 4th list compiled by the EU of high volume substances that were to be evaluated by the Member States’ Competent Authorities, as part of the requirements of EU Council regulation 793/93 “On the Evaluation and Control of the risk of existing substances”. The EU published the final report for this study in 2008 and concluded that for all human health and environmental endpoints, "There is at present no need for further information and/or testing and no need for risk reduction measures".

Additionally the European Union Scientific Committee for Health and Environmental Risks (SCHER), an advisory body to the European Commission, independently reviewed the environmental, human health, and indirect exposure risk assessment, and agreed with all of the conclusions from the EU experts on the outcome that, "There is at present no need for further information and/or testing and no need for risk reduction measures". The SCHER opinions for galaxolide are available for the environment, for human health and for human health though indirect exposure.

As part of the obligations under the EU's Registration, Evaluation and Authorization of Chemicals (REACH), the producers and importers of galaxolide on the EU market have registered galaxolide in December 2010 with the European Chemicals Agency in Helsinki.

In 2010, the state of Oregon added galaxolide to its Priority Persistent Pollutants (P3) list. This is a list of persistent, bioaccumulative toxics that have a documented effect on human health, wildlife and aquatic life.

On June 22, 2016, the Frank R. Lautenberg Chemical Safety for the 21st Century Act (Lautenberg Chemical Safety Act) was signed into law in the United States. The Lautenberg Chemical Safety Act amends the Toxic Substances Control Act of 1976 (TSCA), the nation's primary chemicals management law. On December 20, 2019, EPA finalized the designation of 20 chemical substances as a high-priority for risk evaluation under TSCA, Galaxolide is one of these high-priority chemicals being evaluated for risk.
