= Geranyl propionate =

Names
- IUPAC name (2E)-3,7-Dimethyl-2,6-octadien-1-ylpropionate

Identifiers
CAS Number	105-90-8
3D model (JSmol)	Interactive image
ChemSpider	4511742
ECHA InfoCard	100.003.041
EC Number	203-344-1
PubChem CID	5355853
UNII	U9F1RPB24G
CompTox Dashboard (EPA)	DTXSID8051540
- InChI: InChI=1S/C13H22O2/c1-5-13(14)15-10-9-12(4)8-6-7-11(2)3/h7,9H,5-6,8,10H2,1-4H3/b12-9+ Key: BYCHQEILESTMQU-FMIVXFBMSA-N
- SMILES: CCC(=O)OCC=C(C)CCC=C(C)C

Properties
Chemical formula	C_{13}H_{22}O_{2}
Molar mass	210.317 g·mol^{−1}
Density	0.899 g/cm^{3}
Boiling point	252 °C (486 °F; 525 K)
- Except where otherwise noted, data are given for materials in their standard state (at 25 °C [77 °F], 100 kPa). Infobox references

Geranyl propionate is an organic compound from the group of propionates.

== Presence ==
Geranyl propionate occurs naturally in Artemisia, lemon peel oil, kumquat peel oil, hops essential oil and green cardamom.

== Synthesis ==
Geranylpropionate can be prepared by enzymatic esterification of geraniol and propionic acid in a solvent-free system.

== Properties ==
Geranyl propionate is a colorless liquid. The compound has a fruity odor and a bitter taste.

== Usage ==
In European Union, geranyl propionate is authorized for use as a feed additive for all animal species indefinitely according to Directive 70/524/EEC. It is also used as a flavoring agent.
