= Phenethyl benzoate =

Names
- IUPAC name 2-Phenylethyl benzoate
- Other names: Benzylcarbinyl benzoate

Identifiers
CAS Number	94-47-3
3D model (JSmol)	Interactive image
ChEBI	CHEBI:156233
ChEMBL	ChEMBL2252208
ChemSpider	6926
ECHA InfoCard	100.002.124
EC Number	202-336-5
PubChem CID	7194
UNII	0C143929GK
CompTox Dashboard (EPA)	DTXSID9047590
- InChI: InChI=1S/C15H14O2/c16-15(14-9-5-2-6-10-14)17-12-11-13-7-3-1-4-8-13/h1-10H,11-12H2 Key: OSORMYZMWHVFOZ-UHFFFAOYSA-N
- SMILES: C1=CC=C(C=C1)CCOC(=O)C2=CC=CC=C2

Properties
Chemical formula	C_{15}H_{14}O_{2}
Molar mass	226.275 g·mol^{−1}
Appearance	colorless to yellowish
Odor	floral, rose, honey
Density	1.092 g/cm^{3}
Boiling point	329 °C (624 °F; 602 K)
Solubility in water	sparingly soluble
Solubility	soluble in ethanol, diethyl ether, chloroform and most organic solvents
log P	4.01

Hazards
- GHS labelling
Pictograms	(GHS09: Environmental hazard)
Signal word	Warning
Hazard statements	H411
Precautionary statements	P273, P391, P501
- Except where otherwise noted, data are given for materials in their standard state (at 25 °C [77 °F], 100 kPa). Infobox references

Phenethyl benzoate is an organic compound, an ester of benzoic acid and phenethyl alcohol.

== Ocurrence ==
Phenethyl benzoate is found naturally in several plants, including bilberry (Vaccinium myrtillus), cinnamon leaf (Cinnamomum zeylancium), cassia leaf (Cinnamomum cassia), and sea buckthorn (Hippophae rhamnoides). It is also found in essential oil from flowers of rose and orange.

== Synthesis ==
Phenethyl benzoate can be obtained by the Schotten–Baumann reaction of phenethyl alcohol and benzoyl chloride in the presence of NaOH, transesterification of phenethyl alcohol and methyl benzoate, or acid-catalyzed Fischer–Speier esterification of phenethyl alcohol with benzoic acid.

== Usage ==
Phenethyl benzoate is used as a fragrance agent in the manufacture of perfumes and cosmetics.
