= Hydroxymethylpentylcyclohexenecarboxaldehyde =

Names
- Preferred IUPAC name 4-(4-Hydroxy-4-methylpentyl)cyclohex-3-ene-1-carbaldehyde
- Other names Lyral, Kovanol, Mugonal, Landolal

Identifiers
CAS Number	31906-04-4
3D model (JSmol)	Interactive image
ChemSpider	82714
ECHA InfoCard	100.046.225
EC Number	250-863-4
PubChem CID	91604
UNII	QUE43B9Z2Q
CompTox Dashboard (EPA)	DTXSID1027970
- InChI: InChI=1S/C13H22O2/c1-13(2,15)9-3-4-11-5-7-12(10-14)8-6-11/h5,10,12,15H,3-4,6-9H2,1-2H3 Key: ORMHZBNNECIKOH-UHFFFAOYSA-N; InChI=1/C13H22O2/c1-13(2,15)9-3-4-11-5-7-12(10-14)8-6-11/h5,10,12,15H,3-4,6-9H2,1-2H3 Key: ORMHZBNNECIKOH-UHFFFAOYAY
- SMILES: O=CC1C/C=C(/CCCC(O)(C)C)CC1

Properties
Chemical formula	C_{13}H_{22}O_{2}
Molar mass	210.317 g·mol^{−1}
Density	0.995 g/mL at 20 °C
- Except where otherwise noted, data are given for materials in their standard state (at 25 °C [77 °F], 100 kPa). verify (what is ?) Infobox references

Hydroxymethylpentylcyclohexenecarboxaldehyde (HMPCC) is a synthetic fragrance known by the trade names Lyral, Kovanol, Mugonal, Landolal. It is found in some soaps, eau de toilettes, aftershaves and deodorants. Notable fine fragrances that have it are Norell Norell (1979) and Oscar de la Renta Oscar (1977).

== Synthesis ==
Typical synthesis starts from myrcene and involves a Diels–Alder reaction with acrolein to produce the cyclohexenecarbaldehyde group, this species is marketed as a fragrance in its own right, most commonly under the name 'myrac aldehyde'. Acid-catalyzed hydration of this completes the synthesis by forming the tertiary alcohol.

== Safety ==
Lyral is known to act as a skin allergen and is listed as such in EU Directive 76/768/EEC. It is commonly tested for in patients undergoing patch testing.
