= Synthetic musk =

Type of synthetic scents

Synthetic musks are a class of synthetic aroma compounds to emulate the scent of deer musk and other animal musks (castoreum and civet). Synthetic musks have a clean, smooth and sweet scent lacking the fecal notes of animal musks. They are used as flavorings and fixatives in cosmetics, detergents, perfumes and foods, supplying the base note of many perfume formulas. Most musk fragrance used in perfumery today is synthetic.

Synthetic musks in a narrower sense are chemicals modeled after the main odorants in animal musk: muscone in deer musk, and civetone in civet. Muscone and civetone are macrocyclic ketones. Other structurally distinct compounds with similar odors are also known as musks.

== Nitro musks ==
Musk xylene

An artificial musk was obtained by Albert Baur in 1888 by condensing toluene with isobutyl bromide in the presence of aluminium chloride, and nitrating the product. It was discovered accidentally as a result of Baur's attempts at producing a more effective form of trinitrotoluene (TNT). It appears that the odour depends upon the symmetry of the three nitro groups.

- Musk xylene (1-tert-Butyl-3,5-dimethyl-2,4,6-trinitrobenzene)
- Musk ketone (4'-tert-Butyl-2',6'-dimethyl-3',5'-dinitroacetophenone)
- Musk ambrette (4-tert-butyl-3-methoxy-2,6-dinitrotoluene)

== (Hydrated) indanes ==
Cashmeran

- 6-Acetyl-1,1,2,3,3,5-hexamethylindane
  - Phantolide (Haarmann & Reimer)
- 4-Acetyl-1,1-dimethyl-6-tert-butylindane
  - Celestolide (IFF)
  - Crysolide (Givaudan Roure)
- 5-Acetyl-1,1,2,6-tetramethyl-3-isopropylindane
  - Traseolide (Quest)
- 1,2,3,5,6,7-Hexahydro-1,1,2,3,3-pentamethyl-4H-inden-4-one
  - Cashmeran, not a true musk but with musk odor (IFF)

== Cyclic ethers ==
Ambroxide

Galaxolide

The creation of this class of musks was largely prompted through the need for eliminating the nitro functional group from nitro-musks due to their photochemical reactivity and their instability in alkaline media. This was shown to be possible through the discovery of ambroxide, a non-nitro aromatic musk, which promoted research in the development of nitro-free musks. This led to the eventual discovery of phantolide, so named due to its commercialization by Givaudan without initial knowledge of its chemical structure (elucidated 4 years later). While poorer in smell strength, the performance and stability of this compound class in harsh detergents led to its common use, which spurred further development of other polycyclic musks including Galaxolide.

- 3a,6,6,9a-Tetramethyldodecahydronaphtho-[2,1-b]furan
- 4,6,6,7,8,8-Hexamethyl-1,3,4,6,7,8-hexahydrocyclopenta[g]benzopyrane
  - Galaxolide (IFF)

== Macrocyclic ketones ==
Muscone

A class of artificial musk consisting of a single ring composed of more than 6 carbons (often 10–15). Of all artificial musks, these most resemble the primary odoriferous compound from Tonkin musk in its "large ringed" structure. While the macrocyclic musks extracted from plants consists of large ringed lactones, all animal derived macrocyclic musks are ketones.

Although muscone, the primary macrocyclic compound of musk was long known, it was only in 1926 that Leopold Ruzicka was able to synthesize this compound in very small quantities. Despite this discovery and the discovery of other pathways for synthesis of macrocyclic musks, compounds of this class were not commercially produced and commonly utilized until the late 1990s due to difficulties in their synthesis and consequently higher price.

- (R)-3-Methylcyclopentadecanone
  - Muscone
- (Z)-9-Cycloheptadecen-1-one
  - Civetone
- Cyclopentadecanone
  - Exaltone (Firmenich)
- 3-Methylcyclopentadec-4/5-en-1-one
  - Muscenone (Firmenich)
- 5-Cyclohexadecen-1-one
  - TM II SP (Soda Aromatic)
  - Ambretone (Takasago)

== Macrocyclic lactones ==
Cyclopentadecanolide

- 15-Pentadecanolide
  - Cyclopentadecanolide (Haarmann & Reimer)
  - Exaltolide (Firmenich)
  - Pentalide (Soda Aromatic)
- Oxacyclohexadec-12/13-en-2-one
  - Habanolide (Firmenich)
  - Globalide (Haarmann & Reimer)
- 12-Oxa-16-hexadecanolide
  - Musk R 1 (Quest)
- α,ω-Dodecanedioic acid ethylene ester
  - Arova 16 (Degussa)
- α,ω-Tridecanedioic acid ethylene ester
  - Musk T (Takasago)
  - Ethylene Brassylate (Degussa)
- (10Z)-13-methyl-1-oxacyclopentadec-10-en-2-one
  - Nirvanolide (Givaudan Roure)
- ω-6-Hexadecenlactone
  - Ambrettolide (found in Ambrette seed oil)
- 14-Methylpentadecano-15-lactone
  - Muscolide (found in Angelica seed oil)

== Hydronaphthalenes ==
- 1-(1,2,3,4,5,6,7,8-octahydro-2,3,8,8,-tetramethyl-2-naphthyl)ethan-1-one
- (-)-(6S,7S)-3,5,5,6,7,8,8-heptamethyl-5,6,7,8-tetrahydronaphthalene-2-carbaldehyde
  - Vulcanolide (Firmenich)
- 6-Acetyl-1,1,2,4,4,7-hexamethyltetraline (AHTN)
  - Fixolide (Givaudan Roure)
  - Tonalide (Haarmann & Reimer)
  - Tetralide (Bush Boake Allen)

== Alicyclic musks ==
Helvetolide

Alicyclic musks, otherwise known as cycloalkyl ester or linear musks, are a relatively novel class of musk compounds. The first compound of this class was introduced 1975 with Cyclomusk, though similar structures were noted earlier in citronellyl oxalate and Rosamusk. Alicyclic musks are dramatically different in structure than previous musks (aromatic, polycyclic, macrocyclic) in that they are modified alkyl esters. Although they were discovered prior to 1980, it was only in 1990 with the discovery and introduction of Helvetolide at Firmenich that a compound of this class was produced at a commercial scale. Romandolide, a more ambrette and less fruity alicyclic musk compared to Helvetolide, was introduced ten years later.

== Environmental and health issues ==
Synthetic musks are lipophilic compounds and tend to deposit and persist in fat tissues. Nitromusks and polycyclic musks – having been used for 100 years – have low biodegradability and accumulate in the environment.
