= FiFi Awards =

Fragrance industry awards

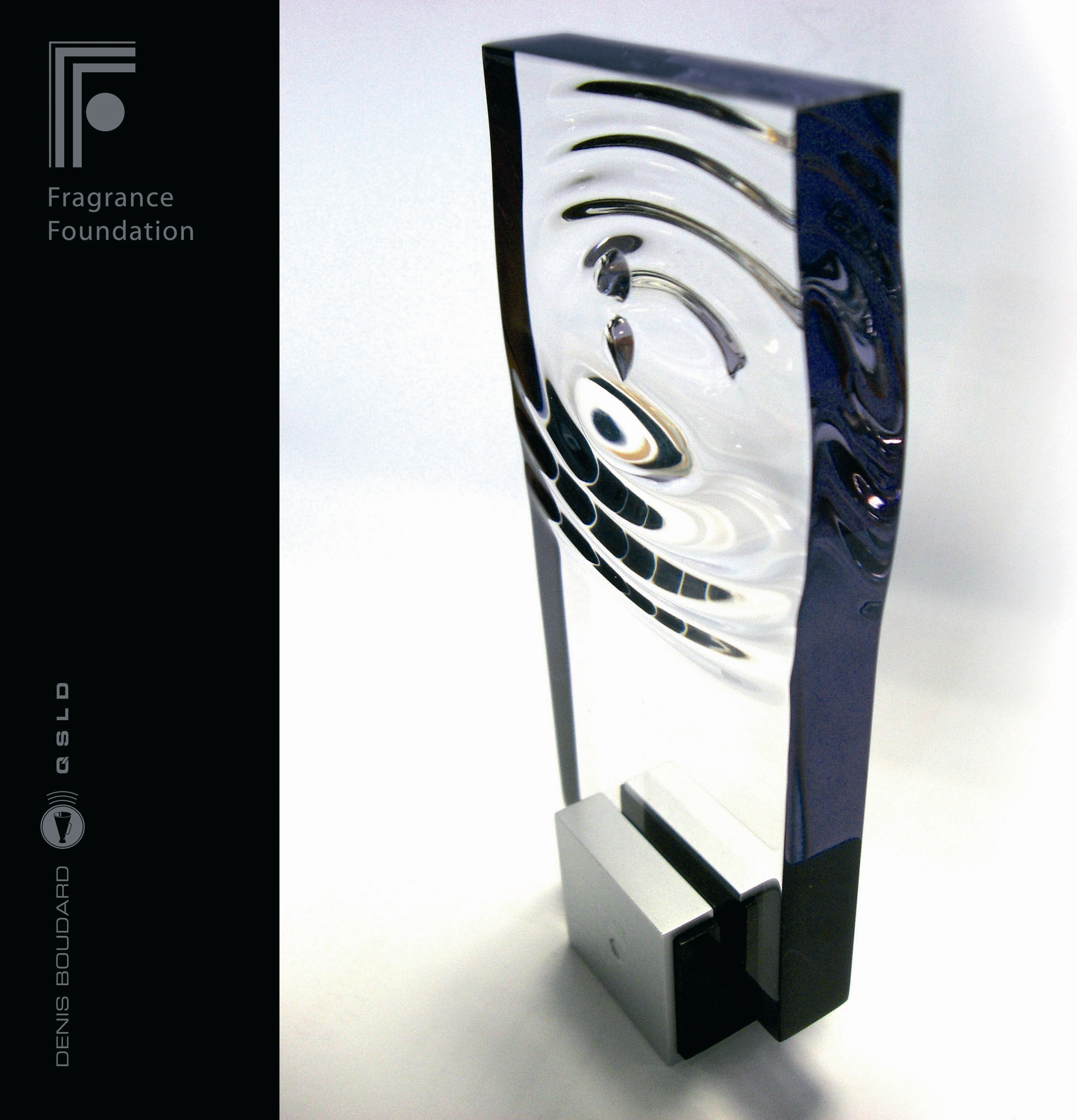
- Website: www.fragrance.org

The FiFi Awards are an annual event sponsored by The Fragrance Foundation which honor the fragrance industry's creative achievements. Known as the "Oscars of the fragrance industry", the awards ceremony was conceived by the former president of The Fragrance Foundation, Annette Green. The event has been held annually in New York City since 1973. The FiFi Awards are attended by around 1,000 members of the international fragrance community, designers and celebrities from the fashion, theater, film, and television industries.

== Current awards ==
=== Fragrance of the Year ===
==== Women's Fragrance of the Year - Prestige ====
2025	Kayali Vanilla Candy Rock Sugar | 42	dsm-firmenich
2023	Prada Paradoxe EDP	Prada
2022	Flora Gorgeous Gardenia EDP	Gucci
2021	My Way	Giorgio Armani
2020	Idôle	Lancôme
2019	Jo Malone Honeysuckle & Davana Cologne	IFF
2018	Gucci Bloom	Coty
2017	Mon Paris	Yves Saint Laurent
2016	Marc Jacobs Decadence	Coty, Inc.
2015	Giorgio Armani Sì EDP	L'Oréal
2014	Modern Muse EDP	Estée Lauder
2013	DOT Marc Jacobs	Coty Prestige
2012	Violet Blonde	Tom Ford Beauty
2011	Gucci Guilty	P&G Prestige
2010	Lola Marc Jacobs	Coty Prestige
2009	Harajuku Lovers Fragrance: Love, Lil’Angel, Music, Baby, “G”	Coty Prestige
2008	Daisy Marc Jacobs	Coty Prestige
2007	Juicy Couture	Liz Claiborne Cosmetics
2006	1.Narciso Rodriguez 'For Her' EDP 2.Euphoria Calvin Klein	1.Beauté Prestige International 2.Coty Prestige
2005	Prada Fragrance	Puig Prestige Beauty
2004	1.Pure Tiffany 2.Burberry Brit	1.Tiffany & Co 2.Burberry Fragrances/ Cosmopolitan Cosmetics
2003	Chance	Chanel
2002	Coco Medemoiselle	Chanel
2001	J'adore	Christian Dior Perfumes
2000	Gucci Rush	Gucci Parfums
1999	Ralph Lauren Romance	Ralph Lauren Fragrances Division
1998	Clinique Happy	Clinique
1997	Allure	Chanel
1996	Acqua Di Gio De Giorgio Armani	European Designer Fragrance Division, Cosmair
1992	Escape	Calvin Klein Cosmetics
1991	Safari	Ralph Lauren Fragrances
1990	Eternity	Calvin Klein Cosmetics
1989	Boss	Prestige Fragrances
1988	Elizabeth Taylor's Passion	Parfums International
1987	Deneuve	Parfums Stern
1986	Obsession	Calvin Klein Cosmetics
1985	Paris	Yves Saint Laurent
1984	Kl	Karl Lagerfeld
1983	Raffinée	Houbigant Paris
1982	Anaïs Anaïs	Cacharel
1981	Flora Danica	Royal Copenhagen
1980	Galanos	Parfums Galanos
1979	Opium	Yves Saint Laurent
1978	Oscar De La Renta	Parfums Stern
1977	Blazer	Anne Klein by Helena Rubinstein
1976	Halston	Halston Fragrances

==== Men's Fragrance of the Year - Prestige ====
2025	Ralph Lauren Polo ’67 EDT	L’Oréal/dsm-firmenich
2024	Yves Saint Laurent Myslf Eau De Parfum	L'Oréal/dsm-firmenich
2023	Terre d'Hermès Eau Givrée	Hermès
2022	H24 EDT	Hermès
2021	Dior Homme 2020	Parfums Christian Dior
2020	Dior Sauvage Parfum	Parfums Christian Dior
2019	Dior Sauvage EDP	Parfums Christian Dior
2018	Y	Yves Saint Laurent
2017	John Varvatos Artisan Blu	Elizabeth Arden
2016	Dior Sauvage EDT	Parfums Christian Dior
2015	Dior Homme Eau	Parfums Christian Dior
2014	Polo Red	L'Oréal/ Ralph Lauren Parfums
2013	Tom Ford Noir	Tom Ford Beauty
2012	Gucci Guilty Pour Homme	P&G Prestige
2011	Bleu De Chanel	Chanel
2010	Tom Ford Grey Vetiver	The Estée Lauder Companies
2009	I Am King	Sean John Fragrances
2008	Dolce & Gabbana Light Blue Pour Homme	P&G Prestige Products
2007	(TIE) Terre d'Hermès/Unforgivable	Hermès/Sean John Fragrances
2006	Armani Code	Giorgio Armani Parfums
2005	Burberry Brit for Men	Cosmopolitan Cosmetics/ Burberry Fragrance
2004	Black Kenneth Cole	Lancaster Group
2003	Ralph Lauren Blue	Ralph Lauren Fragrances
2002	Higher	Christian Dior Perfumes Inc.
2001	Gucci Rush for Men	Gucci Parfums
2000	Ralph Lauren Romance Men	Ralph Lauren Fragrances
1999	Allure Homme	Chanel
1998	Acqua di Gio pour home	Giorgio Armani
1997	Michael Jordan Cologne	Bijan Fragrances
1996	Tommy by Tommy Hilfiger	Aramis
1992	Davidoff Cool Water	Lancaster Group USA
1991	Ricci Club	Parfums Nina Ricci
1990	Eternity	Calvin Klein Cosmetics
1989	Jazz	Yves Saint Laurent
1988	Metropolis	Estee Lauder
1987	Obsession for Men	Calvin Klein Cosmetics
1986	Perry Ellis	Parfums Stern
1985	Drakkar Noir	Guy Laroche
1984	Halston 101	Halston Fragrances
1983	J.H.L.	Aramis
1982	Kouros	Yves Saint Laurent
1981	Oscar De La Renta Pour Lui	Oscar de la Renta
1980	Lamborghini	Parfums Lamborghini
1979	Polo	Warner/Lauren
1978	Devin	Aramis
1977	Halston	Halston Fragrances
1976	Grey Flannel	Geoffrey Beene
1975	Paco Pour Homme	Paco Rabanne
1974	YSL for Men	Yves Saint Laurent

==== Men's Fragrance of the Year - the Luxury range ====
2025	Tom Ford Bois Pacifique	Estée Lauder Companies/Givaudan
2024	Armani Acqua Di Gio Parfum	L'Oreal/dsm-firmenich
2023	Tom Ford Noir Extreme Parfum	Estee Lauder Companies
2022	Sauvage Elixir	Parfums Christian Dior
2021	Essenze Roman Wood EDP	Estée Lauder Cos. ERMENEGILDO ZEGNA
2020	Sauvage Parfum	Parfums Christian Dior
2019	Bleu de Chanel	Parfum Chanel
2018	Tom Ford Oud Minérale	Tom Ford Beauty
2017	Tom Ford Vert D'Encens	Tom Ford Beauty
2016	Tom Ford Venetian Bergamot	Tom Ford Beauty
2015	Tom Ford Mandarino Di Amalfi	Tom Ford Beauty
2014	Tom Ford Rive D'Ambre	Tom Ford Beauty
2013	Colonia Intensa Oud	Acqua Di Parma
2012	Tom Ford Jasmin Rouge Private Blend	Tom Ford Beauty
2011	Tom Ford Azure Lime	Tom Ford Beauty
2010	Tom Ford White Suede	The Estée Lauder Companies
2009	Burberry The Beat for Men	P&G Prestige Products Inc.
2008	Armani Privé Vetiver Babylone	Giorgio Armani Beauty
2007	Terre d'Hermès	Hermès
2006	Armani Privé	Giorgio Armani Parfums
2005	Paul Smith London for Men	Cosmopolitan Cosmetics/ Inter Parfums
2004	Purple Label	Ralph Lauren Fragrances
2003	Marc Jacobs Men	American Designer Fragrances LLC and Parfums Givenchy Inc.
2002	Michael for Men by Michael Kors	American Designer Fragrances LLC and Parfums Givenchy Inc.
2001	Burberry Touch for Men	AdiPar
2000	Salvatore Ferragamo Pour Homme	Fragrances Exclusive
1999	Bulgari Black	Bulgari Parfums
1998	A Men	Thierry Mugler Parfums
1997	Bvlgari Pour Homme	Fragrances Exclusive
1996	L’eau D’Issey pour homme	Mode et parfums
1992	Egoiste	Chanel
1991	Lagerfeld Photo	Parfums Lagerfeld
1990	Tiffany for men	Tiffany & Company
1989	Boss	Hugo Boss, Prestige Fragrances
1988	Bijan For Men	Bijan Fragrances

==== Women's Fragrance of the Year - Popular ====
2019	Ariana Grande Cloud	LUXE Brands Firmenich
2018	At The Beach	Bath & Body Works
2017	Sweet Like Candy by Ariana Grande	Luxe Brands
2016	Victoria's Secret Forever Sexy	Victoria's Secret
2015	Taylor Swift Incredible Things	Elizabeth Arden
2014	Victoria by Victoria's Secret	Victoria's Secret
2013	Justin Bieber's Girlfriend	Elizabeth Arden
2012	1. Heidi Klum Shine; 2. Anthropologie 1922 Lily Sanguine Eau De Parfum	1.Coty Inc 2.Inter Parfums USA
2011	My Life by Mary J. Blige	Carol's Daughter
2010	Halle by Halle Berry	Coty Prestige
2009	1.American Beauty Beloved 2.Victoria's Secret Sexy Little Things Noir EDP	1.BeautyBank 2.Victoria's Secret Beauty
2008	Intimately Beckham Women	Coty Inc
2006	1.Spirit Antonio Banderas for Women 2.So In Love	1.Puig Fragrances & Personal Care Inc. 2.Victoria's Secret Beauty
2005	1.The Healing Garden In Bloom 2.Today Tomorrow Always EDP	1.Coty Beauty US 2.Avon Products Inc.
2004	Celine Dion Parfums	Celine Dion Parfums
2003	The Healing Garden Waters Sheer Passion	Coty Beauty US
2002	1.The Healing Garden Waters 2.Little Black Dress 3.Pink	1.Coty US LLC 2.Avan Products 3.Victoria's Secret Beauty
2001	1.Adidas Moves 2.Demeter Sugar Cane 3.Dream Angels Divine	1.Coty Prestige 2.The Demeter Fragrance Library 3.Victoria's Secret Beauty
2000	1.April Fields 2.Snow 3.Dream Angels Heavenly	1.Coty Prestige 2.Demeter Fragrances 3.Victoria's Secret
1999	1.Dark Vanilla 2.Women of Earth 3.Ann	1.Coty Prestige 2.Avon Products 3.Ann Taylor
1998	1.Fetish 2.Tova Nights 3.Modern	1.Dana Perfumes 2.Tova Beverly Hills 3.The Gap Inc
1997	1.Celebrate 2.Millennia 3.Om	1.Coty Prestige 2.Avan Products 3.GapScents
1996	1.Estée Lauder Pleasures 2.Ghost Myst 3.Dream	1.Estée Lauder USA 2.Coty Prestige 3.GapScents
1992	1.Tribe 2.Elizabeth Taylor White Diamonds	1.Coty 2.Parfums International
1991	Realities	Liz Claiborne Cosmetics
1990	Jaclyn Smith's California	Max Factor
1989	!Ex'cla.ma'tion	Coty Prestige
1988	Glorious	Gloria Vanderbilt
1987	Lady Stetson	Coty Prestige
1986	Maroc	Revlon
1985	Forever Krystle	Charles of the Ritz
1984	Le Jardin De Max Factor	Max Factor
1983	Vanderbilt	Gloria Vanderbilt, Warner Cosmetics
1982	Senchal	Charles of the Ritz
1981	Sophia	Coty Prestige
1980	Chimère	Prince Matchabelli
1979	Enjoli	Charles of the Ritz
1978	Woman	Jovan
1977	Babe	Fabergé
1976	Aviance	Prince Matchabelli
1974	Charlie	Revlon

==== Women's Fragrance of the Year - Luxury ====
Year	Fragrance	Company
2025	Kilian Paris Sunkissed Goddess	Estée Lauder Companies/Givaudan
2019	Tom Ford Lost Cherry	Tom Ford Beauty
2018	Tom Ford Fabulous	Tom Ford Beauty
2017	Tom Ford Soleil Blanc	Tom Ford Beauty
2016	Tom Ford Noir Pour Femme	Tom Ford Beauty
2015	Tom Ford Velvet Orchid	Tom Ford Beauty
2014	Privé Rose D'Arabie	Giorgio Armani
2013	Florabotanica Balenciaga Paris	Coty Prestige
2011	Balenciaga Paris	Coty Prestige
2010	Bond No. 9 Astor Place	Bond No. 9 New York
2009	1.Chloé Eau de Parfum 2.Tom Ford Private Blend Champaca Absolute	1.Coty Prestige 2.Tom Ford Beauty
2008	Prada Infusion D'Iris	Puig Beauty & Fashion Group
2007	KenzoAmour	Kenzo Parfums
2005	Burberry Brit Red	Cosmopolitan Cosmetics/ Burberry Fragrance
2004	Narciso Rodriguez For Her	Beauté Prestige International
2003	Vera Wang	Unilever Prestige
2002	Flower By Kenzo	Parfums Kenzo
2001	Michael	Michael Kors Fragrances
2000	Baby Doll	Yves Saint Laurent
1999	Lolita Lempicka	Gary Farn
1998	1.Contradiction 2.Obsession	1.Calvin Klein Cosmetics 2.Calvin Klein Cosmetics
1997	24 Faubourg	Parfums Hermès
1996	So Pretty De Cartier	Parfums Cartier Paris
1992	Society By Burberry	Royal Brands International
1991	Escada	Escada Beauté
1990	Samsara	Guerlain
1989	Boucheron	Parfums Boucheron
1988	1Tiffany 2.Fendi	1.Tiffany & Company 2.Parfums Fendi
1987	Poison	Christian Dior
1975	Farouche	Nina Ricci
1973	Chanel #19	Chanel

==== Men's Fragrance of the Year - Popular ====
Year	Fragrance	Company
2019	Hollister Togetherness	Batallure Beauty
2018	Coach for men	Interparfums
2017	Original Penguin Premium Blend	Falic Fashion Group
2016	Nautica Life Energy	Coty, Inc
2015	Modern Banana Republic Man	Inter Parfums USA, LLC
2014	Victoria's Secret Very Sexy Platinum for Him	Victoria's Secret
2013	James Bond 007	P&G Prestige Products
2012	1.Curve Appeal for Men 2.Comme Une Evidence Green	1.Elizabeth Arden 2.Yves Rocher North America Inc.
2011	1.Herve Leger Homme 2.Banana Republic of Men Essence EDT	1.Avon Products Inc. 2.Inter Parfums USA
2010	1.Love Rocks 2.Seduction in Black, Antonio Banderas	1.Victoria's Secret 2.Puig USA, Inc.
2009	McGraw by Tim McGraw	Coty Prestige
2008	1.Intimately Beckham Men 2.Derek Jeter Driven Black	1.Coty 2.Avon Products Inc.
2006	1.Stetson Black 2.Today. Tomorrow. Always. for Men	1.Coty Beauty US 2.Avon Products Inc.
2005	1.Spirit Antonio Banderas 2.Liquid Karl by Karl Lagerfeld for H&M	1.PUIG Fragrances & Personal Care Inc. 2.Unilever Cosmetics International
2004	Very Sexy for Him2	Victoria's Secret Beauty
2003	Club Med My Ocean for Him	Coty Beauty US
2002	1.Adidas Team 2.001 Coty 3.Very Sexy for Him	1.Coty US LLC 2.Coty Prestige 3. Victoria's Secret Beauty
2001	1.Aspen Discovery 2.Demeter Sugar Cane	1.Coty Prestige 2.The Demeter Fragrance Library
2000	1.Adidas Moves 2.Modern for Men	1.Coty Prestige 2.Banana Republic
1999	Stetson Country	Coty US
1998	Avatar	Coty US
1997	Raw Vanilla for Men	Coty
1996	1. Hugo by Hugo Boss, 2. Banana Republic M	1. Giorgio Beverly Hills, 2. Banana Republic
1995	1. CK One, 2. Brut Actif Blue	1. Calvin Klein Cosmetics, 2. Fabergé
1994	Stetson Sierra	Coty
1993	Gravity	Coty
1992	Polo Crest	Ralph Lauren Fragrances
1991	1. Navy, 2. California for Men	1. Procter & Gamble Noxell Division, 2. Max Factor
1990	Aspen	Quintessence
1989	Hero	Prince Matchabelli
1988	Iron	Coty
1987	Pierre Cardin Man's Musk	Pierre Cardin
1986	Carrington	Charles of the Ritz
1985	Feraud Pour Homme	Avon Products
1984	Gambler	Jovan
1983	Turbo	Fabergé
1982	Stetson	Coty
1981	Matchabelli	Prince Matchabelli
1980	Chaps	Warner Western
1979	Sport Scent for Men	Jovan
1978	Man	Jovan
1977	Macho	Fabergé
1976	Chaz	Revlon

=== Consumer Choice ===
==== Women's ====
2017	Victoria's Secret Crush	Victoria's Secret

==== Men's ====
2017	Ralph Lauren Polo Blue Eau de Parfum	Ralph Lauren Fragrances

=== Fragrance Hall of Fame ===
Year	Fragrance	Company
2025	Rabanne 1 Million Eau de Toilette	Puig/Givaudan
2023	Viktor & Rolf Flowerbomb	L'Oréal Group
2019	Donna Karan Cashmere Mist	The Estée Lauder Companies
2018	Cucumber Melon	Bath & Body Works
2017	Heavenly	Victoria's Secret
2016	Dolce & Gabbana Light Blue	P&G Prestige
2015	J'Adore	Parfums Christian Dior
2014	Clinique Happy	Clinique
2013	Red Door	Elizabeth Arden
2012	1.24 Faubourg (women) 2.Acqua Di Gio (men)	1. Hermès Parfums; 2.Acqua Di Gio
2011	1. Issey Miyake L'Eau D'Issey (women); 2. Jean Paul Gaultier 'Le Male' (men)	1.Beauté Prestige International 2.Beauté Prestige International
2010	ckONE	Calvin Klein Cosmetics/ Coty Prestige Michael Kors
2009	1. White Diamonds Elizabeth Taylor (women); 2. Davidoff Cool Water (men)	1. Elizabeth Arden; 2. Coty Prestige
2008	Annick Goutal Eau D'Hadrien	Gary Farn Ltd.
2007	Angel by Thierry Mugler	Clarins Fragrance Group
2006	Fracas De Robert Piguet	Fashion Fragrances & Cosmetics Ltd
2005	Arpège	Lanvin Paris
2004	Polo Ralph Lauren	Ralph Lauren Fragrances
2003	Eternity	Calvin Klein Cosmetics
2002	White Linen	Estée Lauder
2001	Beautiful	Estée Lauder
2000	Poison	Christian Dior Perfumes
1999	First	Van Cleef & Arpels
1998	Paco Rabanne Pour Homme	Paco Rabanne
1997	1.Giorgio (women) 2.Canoe (men)	1. Giorgio Beverly Hills; 2. Dana Perfumes
1996	1.Coco (women) 2.Drakkar Noir (men)	1.Chanel 2.European Designer Fragrance Division, Cosmair
1992	Oscar De La Renta	Parfums Oscar De La Renta
1991	Old Spice	Procter & Gamble Noxell Division
1990	Joy	Jean Patou
1989	Shalimar	Guerlain
1988	L'Air Du Temps	Parfums Nina Ricci
1987	Chanel No. 5	Chanel

=== Bath & Body Line of the Year ===
Year	Fragrance	Company
2016	Mimosa and Cardamom Body Crème and Body & Hand Wash	Jo Malone London
2015	Hermès Le Bain	Beauté Prestige International
2014	Peony & Blush Body Créme and Body & Hand Wash	Jo Malone London
2013	Crabtree & Evelyn West Indian Lime	Crabtree & Evelyn
2012	Acqua Di Gioia	Giorgio Armani Beauty
2011	Coco Medemoiselle Bath Essentials	Chanel
2010	Couture Couture by Juicy Couture	Elizabeth Arden
2009	Angel Les Parfums Corps by Thierry Mugler	Clarins Fragrance Group
2008	Origins Organics	Origins Natural Resources
2007	Juicy Couture	Liz Claiborne Cosmetics
2006	Island Michael Kors	Michael Kors Beauty
2005	Chanel No 5 Seduction Collection	Chanel
2004	1.Calm To Your Senses Collection (Prestige) 2.Avon Planet Spa	1.Origins Natural Resources 2.Avon Planet Spa
2002	Peace of Mind Sensory Therapy Collection	Origins Natural Resources
2001	Truth Calvin Klein	Calvin Klein Cosmetics
2000	Origins Sensory Therapy Sleep Collection	Origins
1999	Relaxing Bath Essence	Shiseido Cosmetics Ltd.
1998	Allure Bath and Body Collection	Chanel
1973	Azuree	Estée Lauder

==== Interior Scent Collection of the Year ====
Year	Fragrance	Company
2014	Passion Collection	Nest Fragrances
2013	Aerin Collection	Nest Fragrances
2012	34 Boulevard Saint Germain	Diptyque
2011	Happy Chic	Jonathan Adler by The Maesa Group
2010	Scentbug Diffuser	Slatkin & Co.
2009	Nest Fragrances Collection Candles	Candela Group
2008	Gump's San Francisco Home Collection (Majestic Range, Treasured Range & Opulent Range)	Latitudes International
2007	Banana Republic Chilled Sangria Candle	Inter Parfums USA
2006	Apothia Aromatic Collection Candles	Latitudes International For Apothia
2005	1. Prestige: Scented Candle, 2. Specialty: Gap Scents Color Block Candles	1. Prestige: Cartier, 2. Specialty: GAP, Inc.
2004	1. Prestige: Slatkin & Co. - Elton Rocks, 2. Specialty: Latitudes International for Space.Nk Home London	1. Prestige: Elton John (Crystal Potpourri), 2. Specialty: Potpourri & Passive Diffuser
2003	Tiffany Scented Candle Prism Crystal Votive, Single and Mini Collection	Tiffany & Co.

==== Best New Celebrity Fragrance of the Year - Private Label/Direct Sell ====
Year	Fragrance	Company
2012	Justin Bieber	
2011	Katy Perry Purr	
2010		
2009	Katie Price Stunning	

=== Bottle Design ===
==== Women's Best Packaging of the Year - Prestige ====
Year	Fragrance	Company
2013	Florabotanica Balenciaga Paris	Coty Prestige
2012	Prada Candy EDP	PUIG USA
2011	Gucci Guilty	Gucci
2010	Life Threads Collection	La Prairie
2009	1. Harajuku Lovers Fragrances, 2. Jean Paul Gaultier Ma Dame	1. Coty Prestige, 2. Beauté Prestige
2008	Marc Jacobs Daisy	Coty Prestige
2007	1. Armani Privé Cuir Amethyst (Unisex), 2. Kenzoamour	1. Giorgio Armani Beauty, 2. Kenzo Parfums
2006	Armani Privé (Ambre Soie/Bois D'encens/Eau De Jade/Pierre De Lune)	Giorgio Armani Parfums
2005	Shanghai	Horizon Beauty/Gary Farn, Ltd.
2004	Flowerbykenzo Le Parfum	Kenzo Parfums
2003	Vera Wang	Unilever Prestige
2002	Flower by Kenzo	Parfums Kenzo
2001	Mania	Giorgio Armani Parfums
2000	Gucci Rush	Gucci Parfums (Intercosmetics)
1999	Flirt	Prescriptives
1998	Relaxing Fragrance	Shiseido Cosmetics
1997	24, Faubourg	Parfums Hermès
1996	Cheap and Chic	Moschino
1995	Jaipur Boucheron	Parfums Boucheron
1994	L'eau d'Issey	Beaute Prestige International
1993	Volupte	Oscar de la Renta, Sanofi Beaute
1992	Ungaro	Fragrances Exclusive
1991	Romeo Gigli	H. Alpert & Co.
1990	Montana	Revlon
1989	Boucheron	Parfums Boucheron
1988	Bijan for Women	Bijan Fragrances
1987	Liz Claiborne	Liz Claiborne Cosmetics
1986	Coco	Chanel
1985	Paloma Picasso	Warner Cosmetics
1984	Kl	Karl Lagerfeld
1983	Armani	Parlux
1982	Missoni	Missoni Profumi
1981	Kif	Parfums Lamborghini
1980	Tuxedo	Warner/Lauren
1979	J'ai Ose	Lancôme
1978	Oscar De La Renta	Parfums Stern
1977	Red	Geoffrey Beene
1976	Chloe	Parfums Lagerfeld
1975	Farouche	Nina Ricci
1974	Trigere	Pauline Trigère
1973	Audace	Parfums Rochas

==== Women's Best Packaging of the Year - Popular Appeal ====
Year	Fragrance	Company
2012	Victoria's Secret Angel	Victoria's Secret Beauty
2011	Bombshell	Victoria's Secret
2010	PS I Love You EdT	Bath & Body Works
2009	Avon Bond Girl 007	Avon Products, Inc.
2008	Christian Lacroix Rouge	Avon Products, Inc.
2007	Secrets D'essences Voile D'ambre	Yves Rocher
2006	Celine Dion Belong	Coty Beauty US
2005	The Healing Garden in Bloom	Coty Beauty US
2004	Illusion	Le Club des Créateurs De Beauté (CCB-Paris)
2002	Comédie by Michel Klein	Le Club des Créateurs De Beauté, USA, LLC (CCB-Paris)
2001	Annam by Tan Giudicelli	CCB Paris
2000	Neblina	Yves Rocher
1999	Believe Inspired by Christie Brinkley	Nu Skin
1998	Josie	Avon Products
1997	Celebrate	Coty
1996	Estée Lauder Pleasures	Estée Lauder USA
1995	CK One	Calvin Klein Cosmetics
1994	360° Perry Ellis	Perry Ellis
1991	Realities	Liz Claiborne Cosmetics
1990	Red Door	Elizabeth Arden
1989	!EX'CLA.MA'TION	Coty
1986	Imari	Avon Products
1985	Forever Krystle	Charles of the Ritz Group
1984	Le Jardin De Max Factor	Max Factor
1983	Fantasque	Louis Féraud, Avon
1982	Sculptura	Jovan
1981	Sophia	Coty
1980	Oleg Cassini for Women	Jovan
1979	Tempo	Avon Products
1978	Man and Woman	Jovan

==== Men's Best Packaging of the Year - Prestige ====
Year	Fragrance	Company
2013	Montblanc Legend	Interparfums Luxury Brands
2012	John Varvatos USA	Elizabeth Arden
2011	Marc Jacobs Bang	Coty Prestige
2010	John Varvatos Artisan	Shiseido
2009	Rocawear 91X	Elizabeth Arden
2008	Attitude by Giorgio Armani	Giorgio Armani Parfums
2007	1. Armani Privé Cuir Amethyst (Unisex), 2. Viktor & Rolf Antidote	1. Giorgio Armani Beauty, 2. L'Oréal USA
2006	Armani Privé (Ambre Soie/Bois D'encens/Eau De Jade/Pierre De Lune)	Giorgio Armani Parfums
2005	L'eau Bleue D'issey Pour Homme	Beauté Prestige International
2004	Dunhill	Cosmopolitan Cosmetics
2003	Marc Jacobs Men	American Designer Fragrances LLC, Parfums Givenchy, Inc.
2002	Bvlgari Blv Pour Homme	Fragrances Exclusive
2001	Burberry Touch for Men	AdiPar
2000	1. Sander for Men Jil Sander, 2. Yohji Homme	1. Gary Farn, 2. Yohji Yamamoto Parfums
1999	Bvlgari Black	Bulgari Parfums
1998	Swiss Army Fragrance	Precise International
1997	Bvlgari Pour Homme	Fragrances Exclusive
1996	Tommy by Tommy Hilfiger	Aramis
1995	Catalyst for Men	Halston Borghese
1994	Vendetta Pour Homme	Elizabeth Arden Specialty Group
1993	Jil Sander's Feeling Man	Lancaster Group USA
1992	Boucheron Men's	Parfums Boucheron
1991	Lagerfeld Photo	Parfums Lagerfeld
1990	Fahrenheit	Christian Dior
1989	Jazz	Yves Saint Laurent
1988	Bowling Green	Geoffrey Beene
1987	American Classic	Avon Products
1986	Perry Ellis	Parfums Stern
1985	Krizia Uomo	Parfums Pantene
1984	L'homme	Roger & Gallet
1983	Quorum	PUIG of Barcelona
1982	Calvin	Calvin Klein Cosmetics
1981	Jacomo De Jacomo	Jacomo Parfums
1980	Lanvin for Men	Parfums Lanvin
1979	Van Cleef & Arpels Pour Homme	Van Cleef & Arpels
1978	Devin	Aramis
1977	Halston	Halston Fragrances
1976	Grey Flannel	Geoffrey Beene
1975	Paco Pour Homme	Paco Rabanne
1974	Lucarelli	Frances Denney

==== Men's Best Packaging of the Year - Popular Appeal ====
Year	Fragrance	Company
2012	Curve Appeal for Men	Elizabeth Arden
2011	Herve Leger Homme	Avon Products
2010	Comme une Evidence	Yves Rocher
2009	McGraw by Tim McGraw	Coty
2008	Intimately Beckham Men	Coty
2007	Driven - Derek Jeter	Avon Products
2006	Today. Tomorrow. Always for Men	Avon Products
2005	Spirit Antonio Banderas	PUIG Fragrances & Personal Care, Incorporated
2004	Adidas Adrenaline Man	Coty Beauty US
2002	001 Coty	Coty
2001	Perceive for Men	Avon Products
2000	Homme Nature	Yves Rocher
1999	Stetson Country	Coty US
1998	Cold by Benetton	French Fragrances
1997	1. Navigator for Men, 2. Raw Vanilla for Men	1. Dana Perfumes, 2. Coty
1996	Hugo by Hugo Boss	Giorgio Beverly Hills
1995	CK One	Calvin Klein Cosmetics
1994	Stetson Sierra	Coty
1991	California for Men	Max Factor
1990	Claiborne for Men	Liz Claiborne Cosmetics
1989	Colors Uomo	Benetton
1986	Imperial Musk	Speidel
1985	Feraud Pour Homme	Avon Products
1984	Gambler	Jovan
1983	Turbo	Fabergé
1982	Andron Masculine	Jovan
1981	Matchabelli	Prince Matchabelli
1980	Oleg Cassini for Men	Jovan
1979	Sport Scent for Men	Jovan

=== Advertising ===
==== Editorial Excellence in Fragrance Coverage - Women's Scent Feature ====
Year	Feature
2008	Allure
2007	Elle - "Making Scents, Shop Talk" - December 2006
2006	Elle Magazine - "Modern Vintage" - November 2005 Issue

==== Editorial Excellence in Fragrance Coverage - Women's Scent Bite ====
Year	Feature
2008	Marie Claire
2007	Elle - "Vision Quest" - September 2006
2006	1. Elle Magazine - "Star Maps" - September 2005, 2. Elegant Bride -"Scents of Style" - Fall 2005

==== Editorial Excellence in Fragrance Coverage - Men's Scent Feature ====
Year	Feature
2008	Elle magazine - "BestLife"
2007	GQ - "Stop And Smell…Haitian Vetiver?" - December 2006
2006	Elle Magazine - "The Man Show" - October 2005

==== Best National Advertising Campaign - Print ====
Year	Fragrance	Company
2008	Kelly Calèche	Hermès
2007	Juicy Couture	Liz Claiborne Cosmetics
2006	Flowerbomb by Viktor & Rolf	L'Oréal Designer Fragrances
2005	Burberry Brit - "A New Fragrance for Men"	Cosmopolitan Cosmetics/Burberry Fragrance
2004	Ralph Lauren Blue	Ralph Lauren Fragrances
2000		Allure
1999		Glamour
1998		Glamour And Harper's Bazaar
1997		Marie Claire
1996		Elle
1995		Bride's And Your New Home
1994		Mirabella
1993		Vogue
1992		Allure
1991		Elle
1990		Health
1989		Elle
1988		GQ
1987		Connoisseur
1986		Glamour
1985		Harper's Bazaar
1984		Vogue
1983		Self
1982		Vogue
1981		Harper's Bazaar
1980		Town & Country
1979		Town & Country
1978		L'Officiel, USA
1977		Co-Ed
1976		Vogue
1975		Town & Country

=== Other Awards ===
==== Retailer of the Year ====
Year	Retailer
2008	Bloomingdale's
2007	1. Macy's, 2. Sephora
2006	Nordstrom
1995	1. Saks Fifth Avenue, 2. Sears Roebuck
1994	1. Saks Fifth Avenue, 2. Cosmetics Plus
1993	1. Bloomingdale's, 2. Wal-Mart
1992	1. Dillard's, 2. Genovese
1991	The May Department Stores Company
1990	JC Penney
1989	1. Belks, 2. Long Drug Stores
1988	1. Marshall Field, 2. Osco Drug
1987	Nordstrom
1986	1. Dillard's, 2. Walgreens
1985	1. May Company, 2. JC Penney, 3. Wal-Mart
1984	1. Neiman Marcus, 2. Walgreens, 3, Mervyn's
1983	1. Macy's New York, 2. Eckerd Drug Stores, 3. JC Penney
1982	1. J. W. Robinson's, 2. Walgreens, 3. Mervyn's
1981	1. Neiman Marcus, 2. Sav-On Drug
1980	1. Bloomingdale's, New York, 2. Belk
1979	1. Saks Fifth Avenue, New York, 2. Genovese
1978	1. R. H. Macy, New York, 2. Sears Roebuck
1977	1. R. H. Macy, 2. Longs Drug Stores
1976	1. Bloomingdale's, 2. Eckerd Drug Stores
1975	1. Marshall Field, 2. J.C. Penney
1974	Saks Fifth Avenue

==== Technological Breakthrough of the Year ====
Year	Technology
2008	Certified Organic Preservation - The Estée Lauder Companies
2007	Crescent House Publishing - Scentsa Fragrance Finder, Expert Content by Jan Moran and Michael Edwards
2006	Valois Group for Imagin
2005	International Flavors & Fragrances - Sensory Perception
2004	Michael Edwards & Co. - Fragrance Database: Fragrances of the World.Info.
2003	Risdon-Ams Delivery System: Crave, A Completely New Side-Actuated Spray Package
2002	Givaudan Access
2001	Virtual Aroma Synthesizer - Givaudan Delivery Systems
2000	Techpack America for Jean Paul Gaultier Fragile
1999	Avon Products - Women of Earth (Créme to Powder Parfum)
1996	Givaudan Roure

== Discontinued awards ==
=== Fragrance of the Year ===
==== Women's Fragrance of the Year - European ====
Year	Fragrance	Company
2004	Chance	Chanel
2002	Coco Mademoiselle	Chanel
2001	Flower	Kenzo
2000	J'Adore	Christian Dior Perfumes
1999	Noa	Cacharel
1998	Lolita Lempicka	Parfums Lolita Lempicka
1997	Allure	Chanel
1996	Dolce Vita	Parfums Christian Dior
1995	Tocade	Parfums Rochas
1994	Jean Paul Gaultier	Parfums Jean Paul Gaultier
1993	L'eau D'issey, Issey Miyake	Beauté Prestige International

==== Women's Fragrance of the Year - Specialized ====
Year	Fragrance	Company
2002	Coco Mademoiselle	Chanel
2001	J'Adore	Christian Dior Perfumes
2000	Gucci Rush	Gucci Parfums (Intercosmetics)
1999	Ralph Lauren Romance	Ralph Lauren Fragrances
1998	Clinique Happy	Clinique
1997	Allure	Chanel
1988	Tiffany	Tiffany & Company
1987	Deneuve	Parfums Stern

==== Women's Fragrance of the Year - Mass Appeal ====
Year	Fragrance	Company
2002	The Healing Garden Waters	Coty US
2001	Adidas Moves	Coty US
2000	April Fields	Coty US
1999	Dark Vanilla	Coty US
1998	Fetish	Dana Perfumes
1997	Celebrate	Coty
1996	1. Ghost Myst, 2. Dream	1. Coty, 2. GapScents
1995	Vanilla Musk	Coty
1994	Vanilla Fields	Coty
1993	Incognito	Procter & Gamble Cosmetic and Fragrance Products
1992	Tribe	Coty

==== Men's Fragrance of the Year - European ====
Year	Fragrance	Company
2004	Gucci Pour Homme	Cosmopolitan Cosmetics
2002	Bvlgari Blv Pour Homme	Fragrances Exclusive
2001	Paul Smith Men	Paul Smith
2000	Allure Homme	Chanel
1999	Emporio Armani for Him	Giorgio Armani Parfums
1998	A Men	Thierry Mugler Parfums
1997	Acqua Di Gio Pour Homme	Giorgio Armani Parfums
1996	CK One	Calvin Klein Cosmetics
1995	L'eau d'Issey Pour Homme	Beauté Prestige International
1994	XS	Paco Rabanne
1993	Heritage	Guerlain

==== Men's Fragrance of the Year - Non-Store Venues ====
Year	Fragrance	Company
2002	001 Coty	Coty
2001	Demeter Sugar Cane	The Demeter Fragrance Library
2000	Snow	Demeter Fragrances
1999	Starring for Men	Avon Products

=== Advertising ===
==== Best National Advertising Campaign for a Women's Fragrance ====
Year	Fragrance	Company
2003	Chanel No. 5	Chanel
2002	Marc Jacobs Perfume	American Designer Fragrances LLC, Division of Parfums Givenchy, Inc.
2001	DKNY Women	Donna Karan Cosmetics
2000	Gucci Rush	Gucci Parfums (Intercosmetics)
1999	Ralph Lauren Romance	Ralph Lauren Fragrances
1998	212	Carolina Herrera Perfumes
1997	Ralph Lauren Polo Sport Woman	Ralph Lauren Fragrances
1986	Obsession	Calvin Klein Cosmetics
1985	Paloma Picasso	Warner Cosmetics
1984	Le Jardin De Max Factor	Max Factor
1983	Vanderbilt	Gloria Vanderbilt, Warner Cosmetics
1982	Anais Anais	Cacharel
1981	Sophia	Coty
1980	Chimere	Prince Matchabelli
1979	Opium	Yves Saint Laurent
1978	Woman	Jovan
1977	Babe	Fabergé

==== Best National Print Campaign for a Women's Fragrance ====
Year	Fragrance	Company
1996	1. Established: Jean Paul Gaultier, 2. Introduction: Acqua Di Gio De Giorgio Armani	1. Established: Mode Et Parfums, 2. Introduction: European Designer Fragrance Division, Cosmair
1995	Jean Paul Gaultier	Mode et Parfums
1994	Feminite Du Bois	Shiseido Cosmetics
1993	Donna Karan New York	The Donna Karan Beauty Company
1992	Escape	Calvin Klein Cosmetics
1991	Realities	Liz Claiborne Cosmetics
1990	Red Door	Elizabeth Arden
1989	Loulou	Cacharel
1988	Fendi	Parfums Fendi
1987	Deneuve	Parfums Stern

==== Best National Advertising TV Campaign for a Women's Fragrance ====
Year	Fragrance	Company
1996	1. Established: Chanel No 5, 2. Introduction: Deci Dela	1. Established: Chanel, 2. Introduction: Parfums Nina Ricci
1995	Jean Paul Gaultier	Mode et Parfums
1994	Tribu	Benetton Cosmetics
1993	Caliente	Quintessence
1992	Elizabeth Taylor's White Diamonds	Parfums International
1991	Safari	Ralph Lauren Fragrances
1990	Red Door	Elizabeth Arden
1989	!EX'CLA.MA'TION	Coty
1988	Fendi	Parfums Fendi
1987	Liz Claiborne	Liz Claiborne Cosmetics

==== Best National Advertising Campaign for a Men's Fragrance ====
Year	Fragrance	Company
2003	Ralph Lauren Romance Men	Ralph Lauren Fragrances
2002	Michael for Men, Michael Kors	American Designer Fragrances LLC, Division of Parfums Givenchy, Inc.
2001	DKNY Men	Donna Karan Cosmetics
2000	Ralph Lauren Romance Men	Ralph Lauren Fragrances
1999	Contradiction for Men	Calvin Klein Cosmetics
1998	1. Acqua Di Gio Pour Homme, 2. Cosmair and Diesel	1. European Designer Fragrance Division, 2. Exotic Fragrances
1997	Michael Jordan Cologne	Bijan Fragrances, Inc.
1986	Chaps Musk	Ralph Lauren
1985	Drakkar Noir	Guy Laroche
1984	Halston 101	Halston Fragrances
1983	J.H.L.	Aramis
1982	Kouros	Yves Saint Laurent
1981	Matchabelli	Prince Matchabelli
1980	Chaps	Warner Western
1979	Polo	Warner/Lauren
1978	Devin	Aramis
1977	Halston	Halston Fragrances

==== Best National Print Campaign for a Men's Fragrance ====
Year	Fragrance	Company
1996	1. Established: Tsar, 2. Introduction: A. Tommy by Tommy Hilfiger, B. Hugo by Hugo Boss	1. Established: Van Cleef & Arpels, 2. Introduction: a. Aramis, b. Giorgio Beverly Hills
1995	Catalyst for Men	Halston Borghese
1994	Escape for Men	Calvin Klein Cosmetics
1993	Safari for Men	Ralph Lauren Fragrances
1992	Davidoff Cool Water	Lancaster Group USA
1991	Lagerfeld Photo	Parfums Lagerfeld
1990	Eternity for Men	Calvin Klein Cosmetics
1989	Jazz	Yves Saint Laurent
1988	Halston	Prestige Fragrance
1987	Obsession for Men	Calvin Klein Cosmetics

==== Best National Advertising TV Campaign for a Men's Fragrance ====
Year	Fragrance	Company
1996	1. Established: Stetson, 2. Introduction: Tommy by Tommy Hilfiger	1. Established: Coty, 2. Introduction: Aramis
1995	XS	Paco Rabanne
1994	Escape for Men	Calvin Klein Cosmetics
1993	Safari for Men	Ralph Lauren Fragrances
1992	Egoiste	Chanel
1991		1. Lagerfeld Photo, 2. Versace L'homme
1990	Claiborne for Men	Liz Claiborne Cosmetics
1989	New West	Aramis
1988	Night Spice	Shulton
1987	Obsession for Men	Calvin Klein Cosmetics

==== Other Advertising Awards ====
Year	Award	Fragrance	Company
2007	Best National Advertising Campaign - TV	J'Adore	Dior Beauty
2006	Best National Advertising Campaign - TV	Lovely Sarah Jessica Parker	Coty Prestige
2005	Best National Advertising Campaign - TV	True Star	Tommy Hilfiger Toiletries
2004	Best National Advertising Campaign - TV	Very Irresistible Givenchy	Parfums Givenchy
1978	Best Continuous Fragrance Coverage by a Magazine		Glamour
1977	Best Continuous Fragrance Coverage by a Magazine		Seventeen
1976	Best Continuous Fragrance Coverage by a Magazine		Mademoiselle
1975	Best Continuous Fragrance Coverage by a Magazine		Mademoiselle
2005	Editorial Excellence In Fragrance Coverage - Scent Feature		Allure
2004	Editorial Excellence In Fragrance Coverage - Scent Feature		Allure
2003	Editorial Excellence In Fragrance Coverage - Scent Feature		Allure
2005	Editorial Excellence In Fragrance Coverage - Scent Bite	Elegant Bride	Elle
2004	Editorial Excellence In Fragrance Coverage - Scent Bite		1. Allure, 2. Modern Bride
2002	Best Marketing Innovation of the Year	A Perfect World White Tea Skin Guardian	Origins Natural Resources
2001	Best Marketing Innovation of the Year	Ralph	Ralph Lauren Fragrances
2000	Best Marketing Innovation of the Year	Tommy Hilfiger	Toiletries for tommy's (American running series)
1999	Best Marketing Innovation of the Year	Thierry Mugler Parfums	Angel Source
1976	Best National Advertising Campaign	Aviance	Prince Matchabelli
1975	Best National Advertising Campaign	Jovan	Coty
1974	Best National Advertising Campaign	Charlie	Revlon
1973	Best National Advertising Campaign		Chanel
2002	Most Original Feature By A Magazine	Allure (September)	Scents of Style
2001	Most Original Fragrance Feature By A Magazine		Allure
1998	Environmental Fragrance Introduction of the Year	The Healing Garden	Coty US
1975	Most Exciting In-Store Promotion	Charlie	Revlon
1974	Best In-Store Display	Diorella	Christian Dior
1974	Best In-Store Promotion	Aliage	Estée Lauder
1974	Best Publicity Campaign	Charlie	Revlon
1974	Best Sales Promotion Aid	Charlie	Revlon
1973	Best Promotion	Norell	Revlon

=== Other Awards ===
==== Hall of Fame ====
Year	Person	Company
2008	Vera Wang	
2006	Evelyn H. Lauder	Estée Lauder
2005	1. Arie L. Kopelman, 2. Carolina Herrera	1. Chanel, 2. Carolina Herrera
2004	Oscar de la Renta	
2002	Jeanette S. Wagner	Former Vice Chairman - The Estée Lauder Companies Inc.
2001	Gary Farn, Founder	Gary Farn, Ltd.
2000	Geoffrey R. Webster	Former President Worldwide, Givaudan Roure Fragrances
1998	Jerry L. Abernathy	Former Chairman, Coty
1997	Dr. Fernando Aleu	Compar, Inc.
1996	James E. Preston	Chairman Of The Board & CEO, Avon Products, Inc.
1992	Alvin F. Lindsay	Former President Of Roure Bertrand Dupont, Former Treasurer Of The Fragrance Foundation
1990	Leonard Lauder	President & Ceo, Estée Lauder, Inc.
1988	Jean Pierre Guerlain	Chairman Of The Supervisory Board, Guerlain S.A. Paris
1987	Enrico Donati	Chairman, President And Chief Executive Officer, Houbigant
1986	Francois Dalle	President Of The Strategic Committee, L'Oreal
1985	Milton Stern	Founder and Chairman, Visions Stern
1984	Henry G. Walter Jr.	Former Chairman and Chief Executive Officer, International Flavors and Fragrances
1983	Helen Blake	Former Vice President Of Customer Relations, Charles of the Ritz
1982	Robert Ricci	President, Nina Ricci, Paris
1981	Bernard A. Mitchell	Former Chairman and Founder, Jovan, Inc.
1980	Dr. Walter Langer	Former President And Founder, Evyan Perfumes
1979	Oscar Kolin	Chairman Of The Board, Helena Rubinstein
1978	Richard Salomon	Former Chairman Of The Board, Charles Of The Ritz Group, Ltd.
1977	Jean Despres	Former Executive Vice President, Coty
1976	H. Gregory Thomas	Former Chairman Of The Board, Chanel
1975	Charles Revson	Founder And Former Chairman Of The Board, Revlon
1974	Estée Lauder	Chairman Of The Board, Estée Lauder

==== Other Person Awards ====
Year	Award	Person
1977	The Year's Outstanding Person	Diane Von Furstenberg
1976	The Year's Outstanding Person	Leonard Lauder, President, Estée Lauder
1975	The Year's Outstanding Person	Bernard Mitchell, President, Jovan
1978	The President's Award	1. Van Venneri, Vice President, 2. Divisional Merchandise Manager, I. Magnin
1977	The President's Award	Ernest Shifton, Senior Vice President, Head of Worldwide Perfumery, International Flavors and Fragrances (Posthumously)
1991	Special Military Salute of the Retailer of the Year	Army And Air Force Exchange Service
1984	Special Recognition Award	Parfums Giorgio

==== Innovation of the Year ====
Year	Fragrance	Company
2005		Bath & Body Works
2004		Nordstrom
1998		Givaudan Roure
1997		Quest International
1996	Chanel No 5 Voile Parfumé	Chanel
1974	Musk Oil for Men	Jovan
1973	Cachet	Prince Matchabelli

==== Miscellaneous Awards ====
Year	Award	Fragrance	Company
2005	Consumer's Choice Awards (by CosmoGirl! Magazine) - Women's	Curious Britney Spears	Elizabeth Arden
2005	Consumer's Choice Awards (by Cosmopolitan Magazine) - Women's	1. DKNY Be Delicious, 2. Ralph Cool	1. Donna Karan Cosmetics, 2. Ralph Lauren Fragrances
2004	Consumer's Choice Awards (by CosmoGIRL! Magazine) - Women's	Ralph Lauren Blue	Ralph Lauren Fragrances
2004	Consumer's Choice Awards (by Cosmopolitan Magazine) - Women's	1. Beyond Paradise, 2. Ralph Lauren Blue	1. Estée Lauder, 2. Ralph Lauren Fragrances
2005	Consumer's Choice Awards (by CosmoGirl! Magazine) - Men's	Adidas Moves Fresh for Him	Coty Beauty US
2005	Consumer's Choice Award (by Cosmopolitan Magazine) - Men's		Romance Silver - Ralph Lauren Fragrances
2004	Consumer's Choice Awards (by CosmoGIRL! Magazine) - Men's	Adidas Adrenaline Man	Coty Beauty US
2004	Consumer's Choice Awards (by Cosmopolitan Magazine) - Men's	Very Sexy for Him^{2}	Victoria's Secret Beauty
2003	Celebrity Fragrance Star of the Year		Jennifer Lopez
2013	Certified Fragrance Sales Specialist of the Year	Caroline Hallereau-Williams	Parfums Christian Dior (Dillard's Wilmington, NC)
2005	Certified Fragrance Sales Specialist of the Year		1. Sephora Sales Specialists - Joel Robbins, Beachwood, OH Store, 2. Diane Scagnelli, Manhasset, NY Store
2004	Certified Fragrance Sales Specialist of the Year		Jayne Williams - Marshall Field's Oakland (Troy, MI)
2003	Certified Sales Specialist Top Scorer		Carman Ferraioli, Nordstrom, Paramus, NJ
1977	Most Effective Sales Training		Estée Lauder
1976	Most Effective Sales Training		Revlon
1975	Most Effective Sales Training		Estée Lauder
1974	Most Effective Sales Training		Revlon
1973	Most Effective Sales Training		Chanel
