= Charlie (fragrance) =

1973 fragrance

Fragrance by Revlon
- Category: Floral Aldehyde
- Designed for: Women
- Top notes: Primarily aldehydes, hyacinth, and green leaf
- Heart notes: Primarily jasmine and rose
- Base notes: Primarily oakmoss and sandalwood
- Released: 1973
- Perfumer(s): Francis Camail and Harry A. Cuttler
- Tagline: "A Most Original Fragrance"
- Awards: 1974 FiFi Awards, Best National Advertising Campaign; 1974 FiFi Awards, Women's Fragrance of the Year–Popular; 1974 FiFi Awards, Best Publicity Campaign; 1974 FiFi Awards, Best Sales Promotion Aid; 1975 FiFi Awards, Most Exciting In-Store Promotion

Charlie (later named Charlie Blue) is a floral aldehyde fragrance that was released in 1973 by Revlon. It was the first American fragrance to become an international bestseller. Charlie has since grown into a line of fragrances and related products.

== Fragrance composition ==
The original Charlie was created by perfumers at Florasynth, with perfumers Francis Camail and Harry A. Cuttler, with executive Jack Friedman specifically named.

In 1968, International Flavors & Fragrances (IFF) created Norell for Revlon, a green floral with hyacinth top note that sold well. Revlon approached IFF to make a similar, new fragrance, but with a very high concentration of essential oils. To control costs, Revson (Revlon's founder) asked to see IFF's actual formula and pay on a cost-plus basis; IFF refused to disclose this. Revson then turned to Jack Friedman at Florasynth, and they were willing to share formulas.

Earlier, Florasynth made a floral trial in the Madame Rochas style and they tried to sell it to Dior as a possible scent for Diorella. Dior passed on the formula. Francis Camail, at Florasynth, took the Madame Rochas-style trial scent and reworked it to include Norell-like fresh green top notes. The perfumer for Norell, Joséphine Catapano, noted, "Charlie was the daughter of Norell. In other words, it was not Norell, but it had the greenness, the freshness and the flowery notes, with something new added." Also like Norell, the fragrance uses benzyl salicylate for a diffusing effect of the floral bouquet. Charlie's notable mossy base note even originally came from synthetic Evernyl and thus avoided the allergenic compounds found in other perfumes with oakmoss notes.

The original Charlie (now named Charlie Blue) is classified as a floral-aldehyde fragrance.

- Top notes: hyacinth, citrus oils and bergamot orange, green leaf, tarragon, peach, aldehyde
- Heart notes: jasmine, cyclamen, carnation, orris root, lily of the valley, rose
- Base notes: oakmoss, cedar wood, sandalwood, musk, vanilla

== History and marketing of the Charlie line ==
Charlie is a brand of fragrances that includes the first release (Charlie, now called Charlie Blue) and many other fragrances and related products all with the name "Charlie" in them.

=== Launch and the Charlie universe (1973–1975) ===
Charlie's initial marketing campaign is often studied because it was extremely successful and it changed American consumer habits. Before the 1970s, fragrance usually was marketed as something that would make women more pleasing to men. Charlie and a few other fragrances launched at that time were marketed as identity‐oriented fragrances: they were a way for the wearer to affirm their own personality or position in society.

Charlie was the first to be marketed as a perfume that a woman could buy for herself, rather than something a man bought for a woman and it was marketed as an everyday fragrance for younger women, instead of a luxurious and glamorous evening scent for women in the 35-plus age bracket. The bottle also was designed to convey this difference: plain glass, a functional cap instead of a stopper, and a casually-styled Charlie logo. Critically, the advertisements showed a woman wearing a tailored pantsuit striding confidently across the page, with no man in the photo.

Among the original Charlie models were Ingmari "Charly" Gustavsson (later Stember), and Naomi Sims. Television ads featured Shelley Hack at the Hippopotamus nightclub, with Bobby Short singing the jingle, and in later commercials with Mel Tormé singing the jingle.

During the women's liberation movement, some businesses used the dialogue of the moment to sell their products. In this vein, Revlon tied the Charlie product to the concept of an independent, confident, chic, assertive, modern woman, and the "Charlie Girl" became a personification of the fragrance. Revlon's marketing team developed a 20-point profile of the Charlie Girl—the person they were marketing to—and some of her characteristics emphasized a feeling of independence: 'Wears pants to work even though it's against the rules,' 'Can be tough, believes rules are secondary,' 'Can be very soft, but is never passive', and 'Has her own integrity based on her own standards'. This positioned the Charlie Girl within the larger "New Woman" marketing in the US that used the language of the women's liberation movement: women who wanted equal pay and reproduction rights, without the positioning of women shown only as wives and mothers, and women who importantly (for marketing) were consumers who purchased for themselves and their households. The year Charlie launched, there had been a 21% increase in representation of working women in advertisements.

Revlon launched Charlie in February; this, too, was unusual because new scents traditionally were introduced just before Christmas as gift items. A February roll-out allowed them to have a month without competition, and underscored the marketing message that it was an everyday scent. In its first year, Revlon sold $10 million of Charlie. In 1974, Charlie won multiple FiFi Awards from The Fragrance Foundation: Best National Advertising Campaign; Women's Fragrance of the Year–Popular; Best Publicity Campaign; and Best Sales Promotion Aid. In 1975, Charlie won another FiFi Award: Most Exciting In-Store Promotion. Charlie was the first American fragrance to become an international bestseller and was the world's best-selling fragrance within three years. At its peak in the 1970s, Charlie had wholesale revenues of about $85 million.

Charlie's success led to similar marketing: the Enjoli fragrance marketed to the "superwoman" using a jingle riffing off the popular song, I'm a Woman ("I can bring home the bacon, fry it up in a pan and never, ever let you forget you're a man. Enjoli."); the Aviance fragrance also appealed to the "superwoman" archetype; and the Rive Gauche fragrance asked, "What do you give an independent woman" who is "having too much fun to marry"?

==== Charlie Men and Chaz ====
Revlon's Charlie division released Charlie Men in 1974 and Chaz in 1975, later merging the two under the Chaz name (marketed as Ciaz in Italy). Chaz is an aromatic fougère; Tom Selleck was its face. Charlie and Chaz were marketed together, and originally Chaz was only sold at the women's Revlon counter in department stores.

Chaz won a FiFi award in 1976. In 1986, Chaz Musk for Men and a Chaz body spray were added to the line. Chaz was later made by Jean Philippe, who also launched Chaz Sport for Women. Chaz is now discontinued.

=== The Charlie Girl evolves (mid–1980s to early 1990s) ===
In 1975 there were important leadership changes. Revlon's founder Charles Revson, the brand's namesake, died and two months later so did Revlon's Creative Director, a woman named Kay Daly who did all of Charlie's initial advertising and promotion.

With both the brand's founder and its creative architect gone, Revlon's new leadership began reassessing Charlie's direction. The marketing shifted noticeably: she no longer wore trousers, and she had male partners. Revlon's executive vice president Lawrence Wechsler explained, "We had gone a little too far with the whole women's liberation thing" and that a more important issue was "the biological clock". Revlon's approach was informed by research from Yankelovich, Skelly and White which said young women were again interested in marriage and starting families.

The original Charlie fragrance freshened their marketing campaign by including other models and actresses as the Charlie Girl, including Darnella Thomas, Susan Hess, and Sharon Stone. It's also at this time that Charlie released a controversial TV commercial which showed vignettes of "Charlie Girl" women including one patting a man on the backside as they walk down the sidewalk of a city's business area. While some praised the ad as being "playful" and representing "female self-sufficiency," others called it "sexist" and "in poor taste."

In 1985, Revlon was sold in a highly-leveraged buyout to Pantry Pride, a subsidiary of Ronald Perelman's holding company. Perelman returned Revlon's focus to its beauty brands. The next year, the Charlie Naturals collection is released with the tagline "A whole new species of fragrance. For a whole new species of woman." The print ads continued the appeal to the independent, modern woman. The marketing targeted younger females, who could later "graduate" to the original Charlie scents. The bottles had a ribbed woodgrain texture with only color differentiating the three scents:

- Charlie Naturals Herbal Forest
- Charlie Naturals Fresh Flowers
- Charlie Naturals Rare Musk

Charlie Oriental was released in 1989 with the tagline "Eastern spice meets Western spirit." It featured a green jade-style bottle and was an amber chypre. Some packaging described it as part of a "Charlie World Collection," though this branding was subsequently dropped.

=== Line extension and the "wardrobe" strategy (1993 to late 1990s) ===
In 1993, Revlon introduced the concept of a Charlie "wardrobe"—a range of fragrances for different occasions and seasons, a collection that a person could rotate through instead of having a single signature scent. The campaign for the first wardrobe fragrance released used the tagline "Is there room in this town for two Charlies?" With the addition of Charlie Red, the original Charlie was rebranded as Charlie Blue. (The original Charlie had always come in a blue box, and a few years prior the blue had been made even darker.) The marketing campaign shifted to glamour and pop culture, bringing in supermodels to be the face of each fragrance.

- For Charlie Blue, TV commercials included one spot with Cindy Crawford and Little Richard singing a jingle that riffed on his Good Golly, Miss Molly. Linda Evangelista appeared in print ads and commercials.
- Charlie Red (1993) is a floral-amber scent with fruity and floral notes, and an amber and tonka bean base. Claudia Schiffer was the face for Charlie Red, and advertisements paired her with Brooke Shields.
- Charlie White (1994) is an aquatic-floral with notes of watermelon, lily of the valley, and peach. When it was released, similar TV commercials with Karen Duffy promoted Charlie Red and Charlie White.
- Charlie Gold (1995) is a gourmand with notes of apricot, caramel, and cinnamon. Claudia Schiffer returned to be the face of this fragrance in print ads.

By 1994, wholesale volume had fallen to about $45 million, but was still one of the top-five best-selling fragrances in the mass fragrance market.

=== Later years (2000–present) ===
By the turn of the century onward, Charlie's story became increasingly tied to Revlon's own corporate fortunes.

Charlie had lost significant ground and the line was mostly competing with products in the body spray category, especially with Fabergé's Impulse (body mist) that targeted the younger Millennials. Charlie eventually created a campaign built around an animated brand character, though the line continued to rely primarily on body sprays and fruity florals targeting younger buyers.

Revlon struggled for most of the years after Perelman's 1985 hostile takeover. There were many reasons for this, but industry outsiders point to one contributing problem within their fragrances division: they didn't build upon Charlie, which had been a profit producer. Another industry expert suggested Gen-Z's affinity for nostalgia could make Charlie ripe for a come-back.

Revlon filed for bankruptcy in 2022, and emerged from bankruptcy as a private company with several in-house fragrance brands like Revlon Charlie and Elizabeth Arden Red Door, and fragrance licenses for Halston, Curve, and others. In 2026, fragrance sales made up about 25% of Revlon's sales. An interview with the CEO revealed plans for several of the fragrance lines, but no mention of plans for Charlie.

== List of Charlie products ==
- Charlie (later named Charlie Blue) (1973)
- Charlie Men (1974) / Charlie Chaz (1975)
- Charlie Splash-On Talc (date unknown)
- Charlie Moisture Mist Spray and Moisture Bubble Cologne (date unknown)
- Charlie Body Silk (date unknown), bath line including after-bath tonic, lotion, bubble bath, soap, and powder
- Charlie cosmetics (date unknown), including lipstick, eye shadow, and mascara
- Charlie Madison Avenue (1981), a fresh floral
- Charlie Go-Lightly (1986), bath and body line with chypre notes
- Charlie Naturals Herbal Forest (1986)
- Charlie Naturals Fresh Flowers (1986)
- Charlie Naturals Rare Musk (1986)
- Charlie Oriental (1989), an amber chypre
- Charlie Express! (1991), a green floral with herbal notes
- Charlie Red (1993), a floral-amber scent with fruity and floral notes, and an amber and tonka bean base
- Charlie White (1994), an aquatic-floral with notes of watermelon, lily of the valley, and peach
- Charlie Gold (1995), a gourmand with notes of apricot, caramel, and cinnamon
- Charlie Sunshine (1997), a citrus floral with citrus, green, and freesia notes
- Charlie White Musk (1997), a fruity floral with base notes of musk, sandalwood, and amber
- Charlie Silver (1998), a fruity floral with notes of lime, pear, magnolia, and lily of the valley
- Charlie Urban Energy (2000), a citrus floral with citrus, tomato leaf, pineapple, and jasmine notes
- Charlie Instinct (2001), a fruity floral with pink peppercorns, citrus, and marigold notes
- Charlie Blushed (2006), a floral with bergamot, peach, and rose notes
- Charlie Breeze (2006), a floral aquatic with citrus and white flower notes
- Charlie Crystal Chic (2008) body spray
- Charlie Little Secrets (2008), a limited-edition EDT
- Charlie Pink Sparkle (2008), a fruity floral with freesia and pomegranate notes
- Charlie Violet Dream (2008), a floral with violet notes
- Charlie White Blossom (2008), a floral with white flower notes
- Charlie Black (2009), an amber vanilla with orange, cherry, almond, caramel, amber, and vanilla notes
- Charlie Chic (2009), an amber floral with sandalwood, amber, spice, and patchouli notes
- Charlie Passion (2009) body spray
- Charlie Pink (2009), a fruity floral with tangerine, red berry, vanilla, and floral notes
- Charlie Secret (2009) body spray
- Charlie Touch (2010), a floral with rose, vanilla, and musk notes
- Charlie Essence (estimated 2011)
- Charlie Enchant (2012) body spray
- Charlie Shimmer (2013) body spray
- Charlie Divine (2015) body spray
- Charlie Rio Rebel (2016), limited edition body spray
- Charlie Sexy (2018) body spray
- Charlie Glam (date unknown) body spray
- Charlie Independent (date unknown), cucumber body mist
- Charlie Bold (date unknown), coconut body mist
- Charlie Fearless (date unknown), citrus body mist
- Charlie Fun (date unknown), floral body mist
