= Bijan (designer) =

Iranian fashion designer (1940–2011)

Bijan Pakzad
- Born: 4 April 1940; Tehran, Imperial State of Iran
- Died: 16 April 2011 (aged 71); Beverly Hills, California, U.S.
- Occupation: Fashion Designer
- Known for: The most expensive menswear store in the world
- Label: Bijan
- Spouses: Sigi Pakzad (divorced) Tracy Hayakawa (divorced)
- Children: 3
- Awards: FiFi Most Successful Men's Fragrance 1988; FiFi Best Women's Fragrance Package 1988; FiFi Men's Fragrance Star of the Year Specialty/ Department Stores 1997; FiFi Best National Advertising Campaign – Men's 1997; 1995 Ig Nobel Chemistry Prize; 2010 Otis College of Art and Design Otis Design Legend Award; 2011 Oxford University "Entrepreneur of the Year"
- Website: bijan.com

Bijan Pakzad (/biːˌʒæn ˈpɑːkzɑːd/ bee-ZHAN PAHK-zahd; Persian: بیژن پاکزاد, pronounced [biːˈʒæn pɒːkˈzɒːd]; 4 April 1940 – 16 April 2011), generally known mononymously as Bijan, was an Iranian designer of menswear and fragrances.

== Biography ==
Bijan was born in Tehran, Iran in either 1940 or 1944. He was the son of a wealthy businessman. He attended Institut Le Rosey, and studied design in Switzerland and Italy. Bijan's career began in Iran with the Pink Panther Boutique in Tehran.

Upon immigrating to the United States in 1973, Bijan settled in Los Angeles and established his exclusive boutique on Rodeo Drive in Beverly Hills in 1976. He had initially purchased a parking lot that he turned into a building store, and was confident his business in L.A. would take off because "I saw brilliant men earning $100,000 a year dressed in the most ridiculous clothes".

In 1984, he opened a second store on Fifth Avenue and 55th Street in New York (which closed in 2000). By 1985, he had claimed 15,000 customers, including four kings and sixteen presidents. In his first ten years of business, he claimed a $150 million revenue. He owned a textile factory in Italy, where he manufactured his custom-made clothing In 1989, the Bijan NY store was hit by the 2-year, $50-million renovation of the adjacent St. Regis Hotel, and launched litigation against its then-owner, Sheraton.

In 2000, Bijan generated controversy when he published advertisements featuring a nude "rotund model named Bella", which were rejected by many New York magazines before being accepted by Tina Brown's Talk. He said the ads were an homage to painters Peter Paul Rubens, Henri Matisse, and Fernando Botero, whose art has featured full-figured women, and said "I embrace the beauty of all women". Once they were published in Talk, the ads were accepted by several of the publications that had previously rejected them.

He launched the Michael Jordan fragrance in 1996. According to the 2001 Los Angeles Times Calendar Section, the Bijan Perfume and Fashion Business has brought in an estimated $3.2 billion in sales worldwide. In November 1997, two executives of Bijan were robbed of $3 million worth of jewelry in London in a very elaborate heist.

On April 14, 2011, Bijan suffered a stroke and was rushed to Cedars-Sinai Medical Center in Los Angeles. He had brain surgery, but never recovered and died two days later on April 16, 2011 at 8:05 am. Public records indicate he was 71. Bijan's boutique on Rodeo Drive was sold to LVMH for US$122 million in August 2016. The boutique moved across the street in 2020.

== Work ==
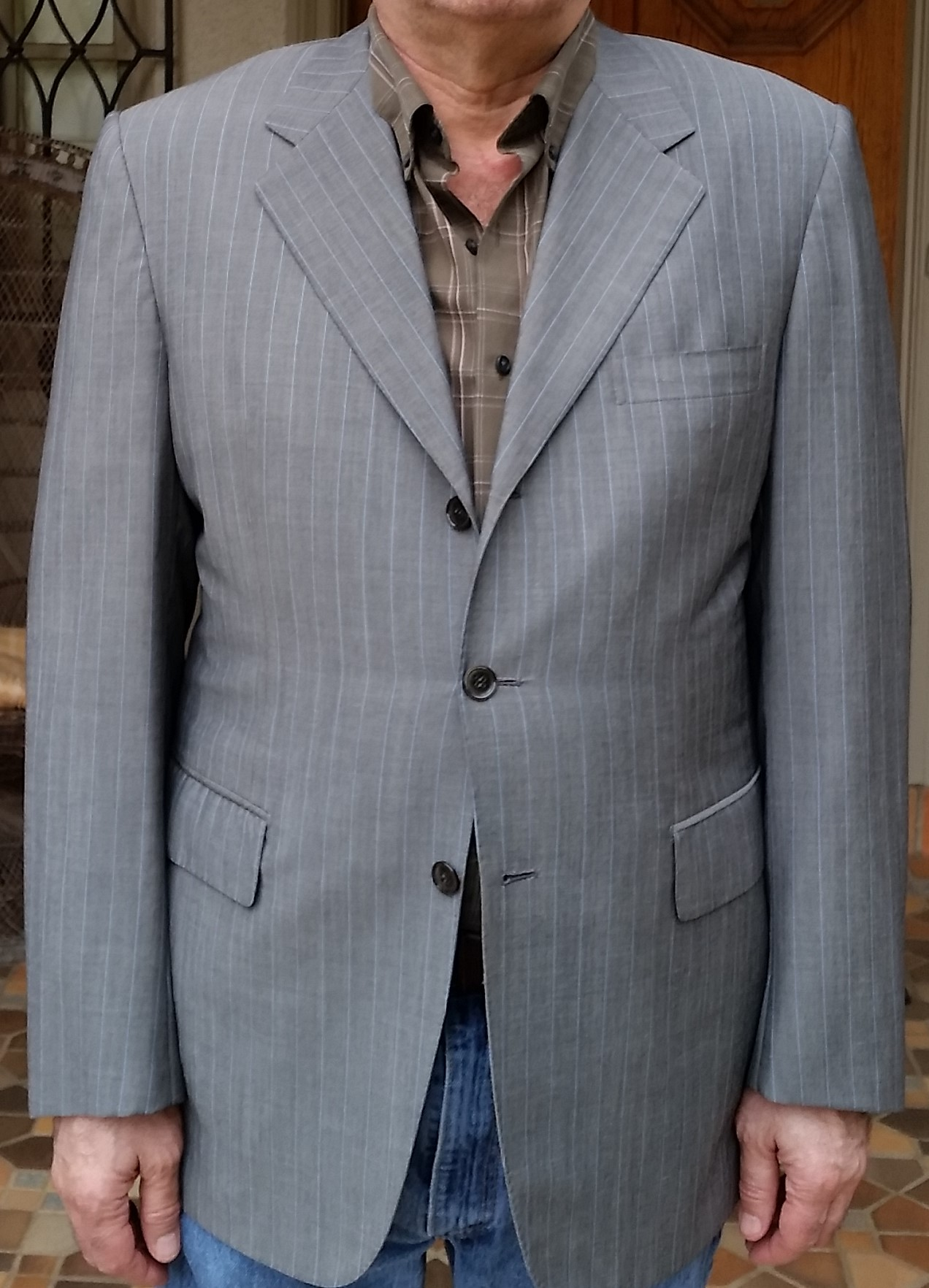
A Bijan suit jacket

Bijan specialized in exclusive high-fashion designs. He never held a fashion show to exhibit his creations. His New York Times store was a curiosity in the city as it was by appointment only, to ward off the "untasty people." He once said "I do not want to sound snobby, but I have power, I have connections with all those people, I have homes all over the world, all you want for a 45-year-old man. I am a multimillionaire myself." One of his advertising slogan was "The costliest men's wear in the world". He designed a $10,000, 24-karat (parts), .38 caliber Colt automatic pistol ("Now you tell me, is this something a murderer would buy?") and a line of bulletproof clothing launched after the attempted assassination of Ronald Reagan in 1981 (a saleswoman claimed Bijan was the first fashion designer to make bullet resistant clothing). In 2010, he designed a limited edition Rolls-Royce coupé with a price tag of $1 million.

Bijan's fragrances for both men and women are known for their distinctive circular glass flacon with an open center and a dividing web. When half full, the fragrance fills two separate chambers, seemingly defying the law of gravity that liquid seeks its own level. One of these perfume bottles is featured in the permanent exhibit of the Smithsonian Institution.

Among his clients, Bijan claimed to count five U.S. presidents – both George H. W. Bush and his son, Barack Obama, Ronald Reagan, and Bill Clinton – as well as politicians such as Tony Blair, Vladimir Putin, Najib Razak, Nechirvan Barzani, Farah Pahlavi and Mohammad Reza Pahlavi. He also dressed other fashion designers such as Oscar de la Renta, Tom Ford, and Giorgio Armani, actors such as Tom Cruise and Anthony Hopkins, and professional footballers including Mick McCarthy and Liam Brady. He claimed to foster very special relationships with his customers, a key quality to know how to dress them best. Each purchase came with a notebook detailing how to wear it best.

== Personal life ==
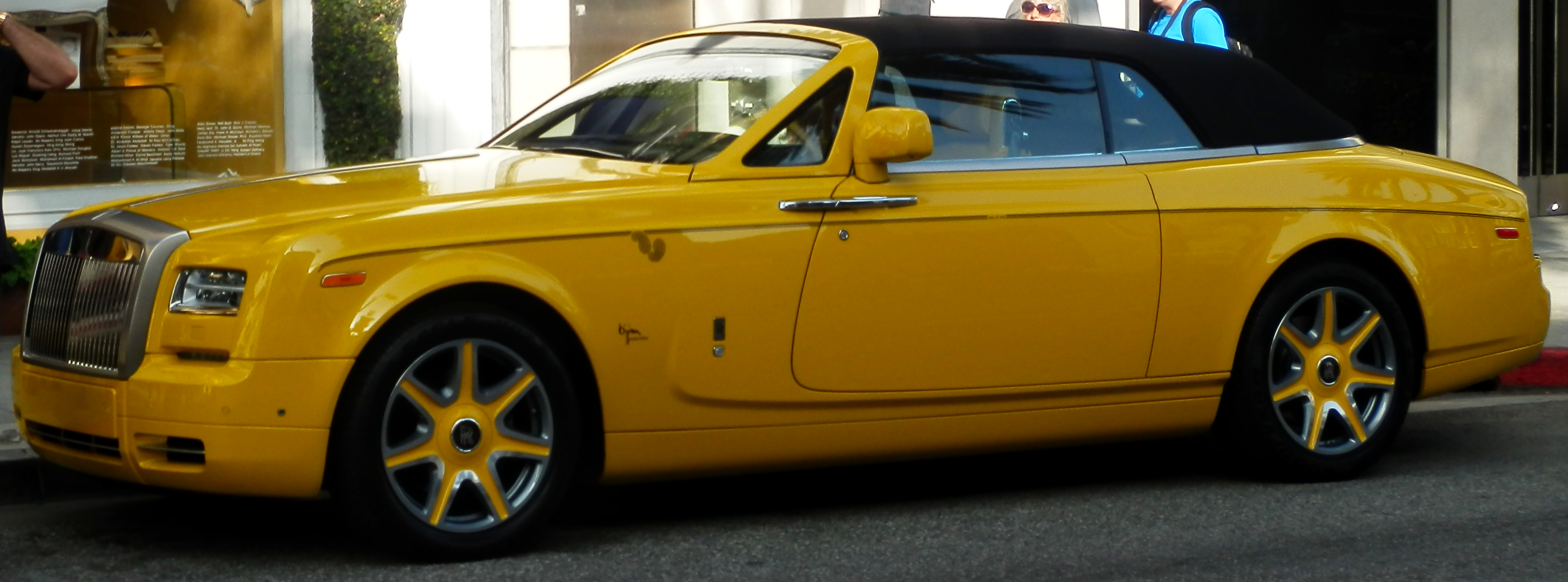
Bijan's custom Rolls-Royce Phantom Drophead Coupé, commissioned shortly before his death

Bijan was married twice. His first wife of eighteen years was Sigi Pakzad a Swiss-German whom he met while living in Europe in the 1960s; they had one daughter, Daniela Pakzad. His second wife was Irish-Japanese interior designer and model Tracy Hayakawa; they married in 1986 and divorced in 1995. They had two children together: Alexandra and Nicolas.

He was the owner of a 23-car garage filled with luxury custom-made vehicles.

== Bijan Bugatti Veyron 16.4 ==
Bijan is most associated with the Bijan Bugatti Veyron 16.4, a custom-made Veyron. Created as a collaboration between Bijan and Bugatti, the Bijan Bugatti Veyron prominently features Bijan's signature yellow. The vehicle is generally regarded as a Beverly Hills landmark.

Since Bijan's death, the Bugatti, along with various other custom vehicles Bijan owned, such as his Rolls-Royce Phantom Drophead Coupé, has been parked outside the Bijan boutique on Rodeo Drive in Beverly Hills, purportedly the last place he left it before his death.

The Bugatti was vandalized in July 2011, when a local transient broke the passenger-side window. The vandal was arrested by Beverly Hills Police Department officers shortly afterwards. The vehicle was soon repaired. In early 2017, the Veyron was sold to a client in Dubai. The new owner has since sold it to another collector in Dubai.

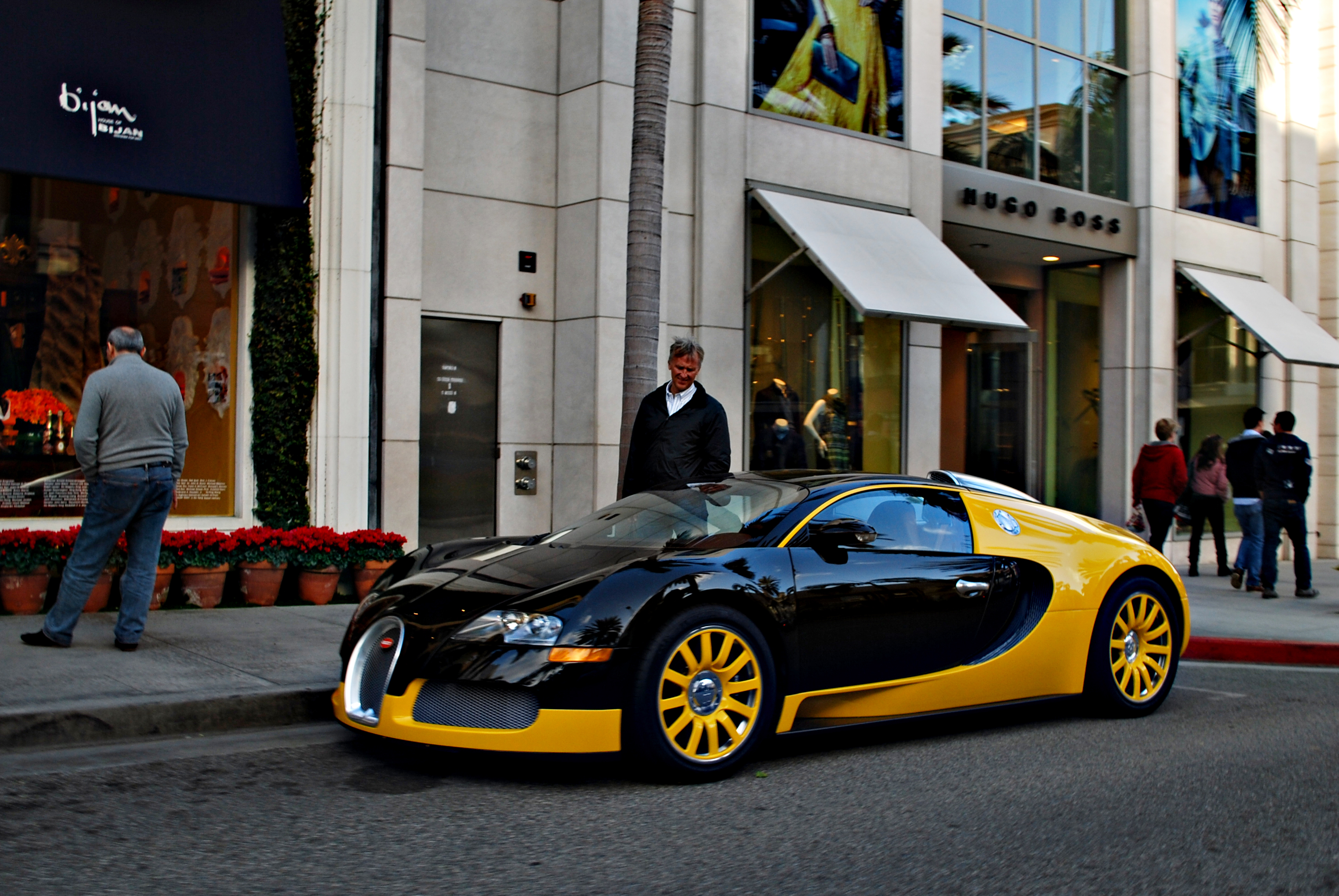

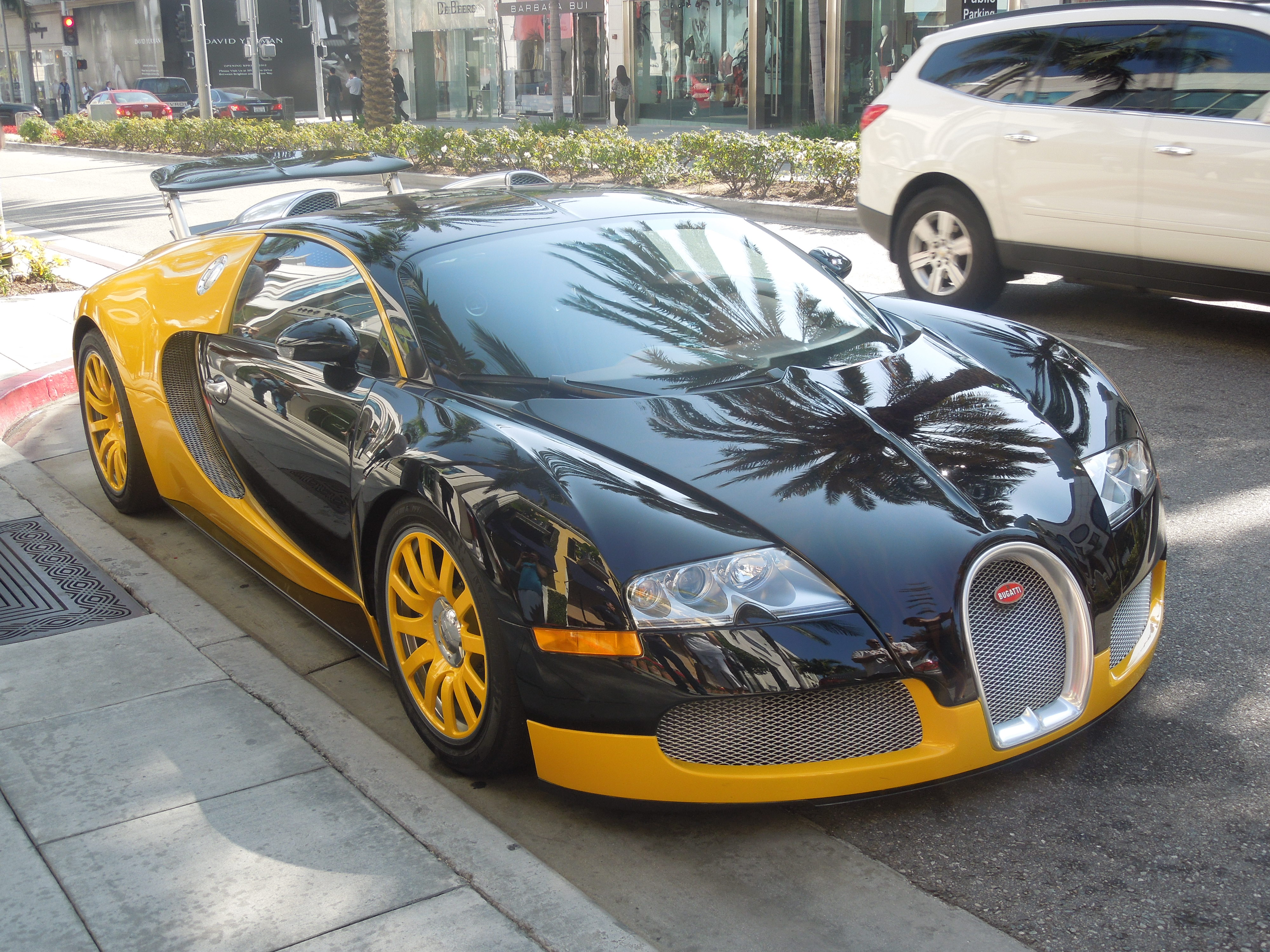

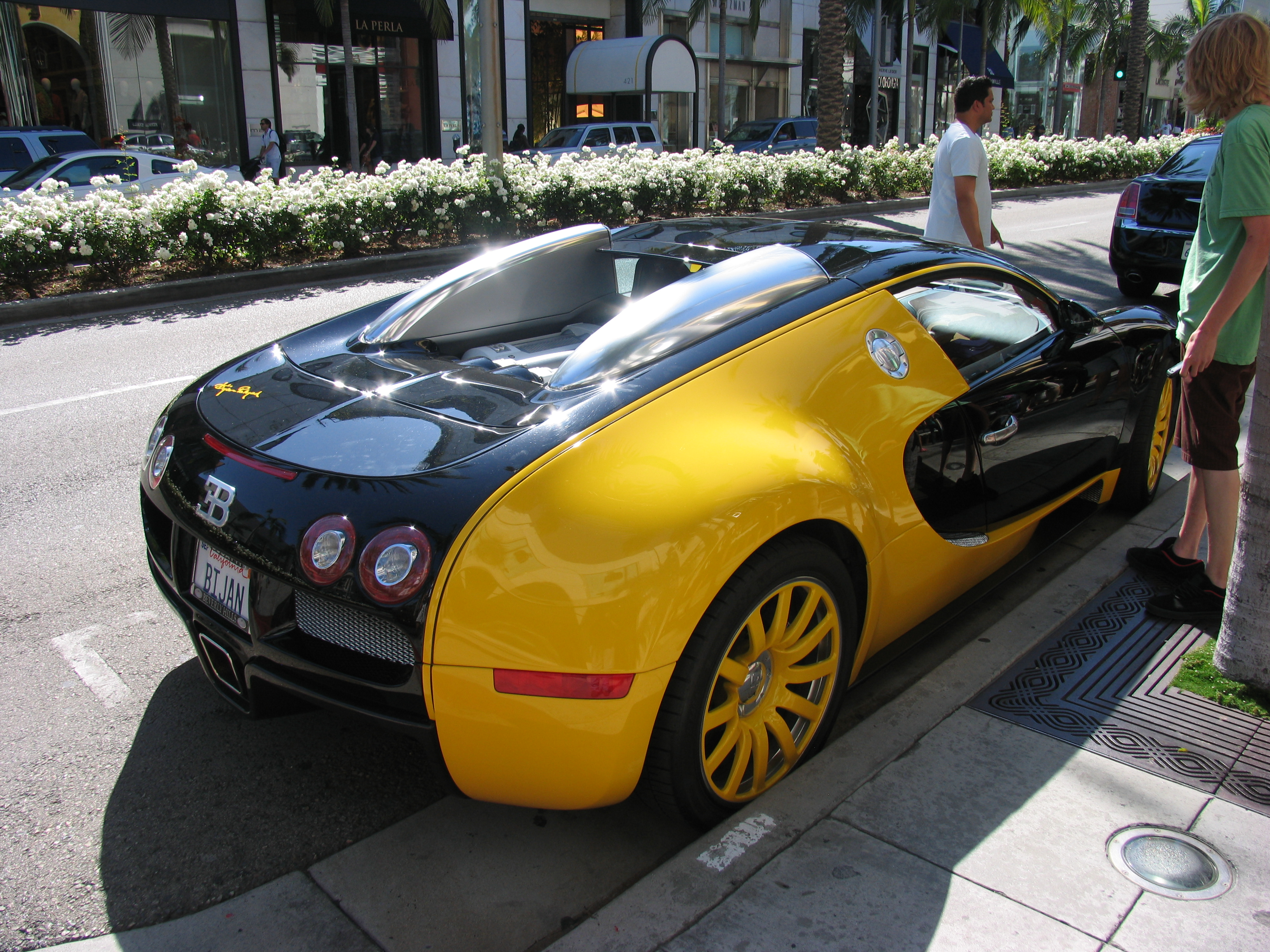

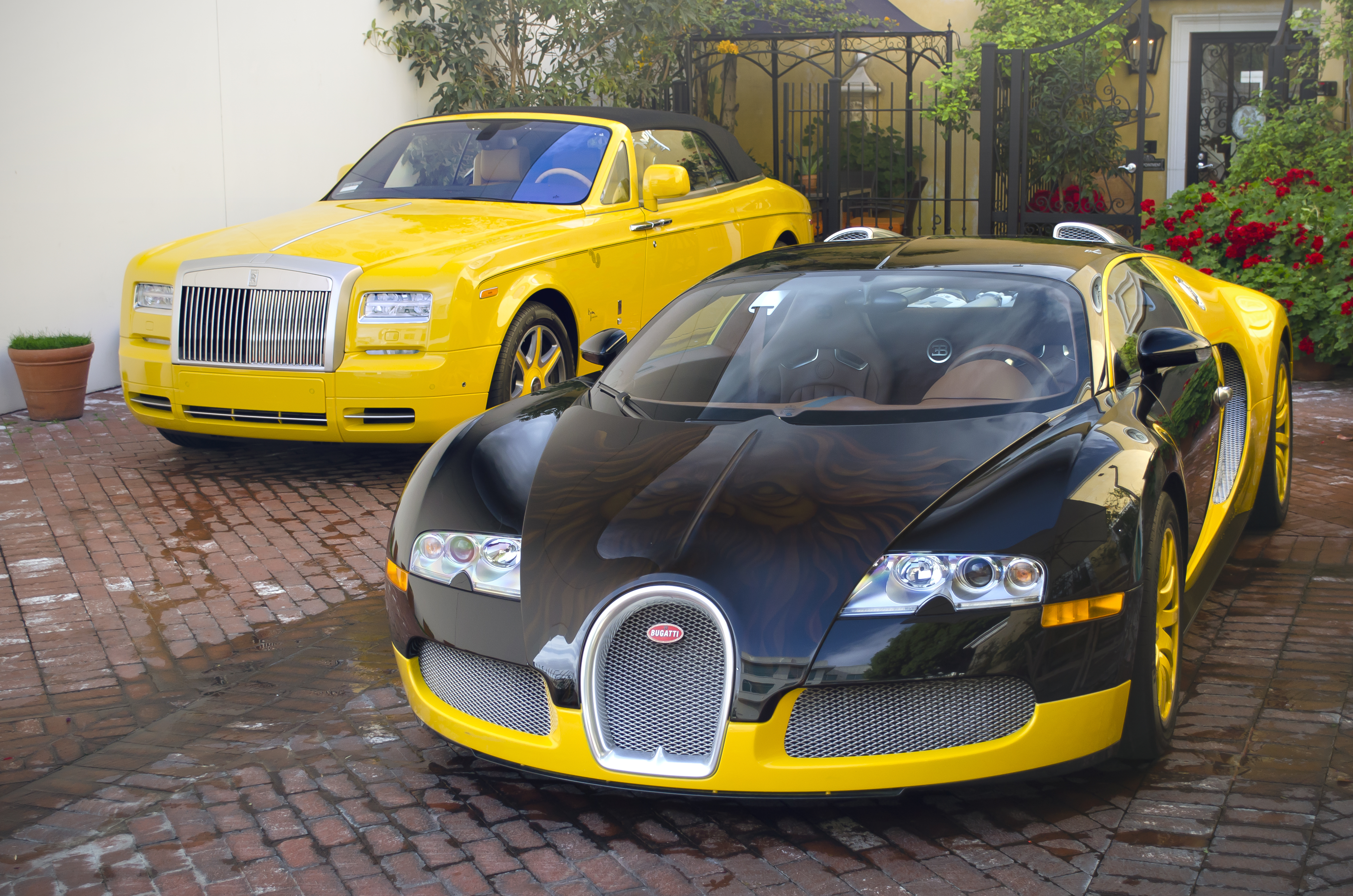

== See also ==
- List of Ig Nobel Prize winners
