= Charles Jundt =

American hairdresser and buisnessman

- Born: 1880; Alsace-Lorraine, German Empire
- Died: 1945 (aged 64–65)
- Citizenship: American
- Occupation: Coiffeur
- Employer: Ritz-Carlton
- Spouse: Anna

Charles Jundt (1880 in Alsace-Lorraine – 1945) was a New York City coiffeur who founded the Charles of the Ritz line of cosmetics products.

== Biography ==
Jundt came to New York in 1916 via Paris and London and took over the beauty salon of the Ritz-Carlton Hotel. He became an American citizen in 1921. By 1926, he was marketing beauty products under the name Charles of the Ritz. He had a wife, Anna, and a daughter, Ethel.

In 1932, Adeita de Beaumont Fisher, the estranged wife of cartoonist Bud Fisher, was awarded $5,000 damages after Jundt burned Fisher's ear while styling her hair.
