= White Diamond =

White diamond may refer to:

- a white diamond

== Entertainment ==
- White Diamond: A Personal Portrait of Kylie Minogue, a 2007 documentary film directed by fashion designer William Baker
- The White Diamond, a 2004 documentary film by Werner Herzog
- "White Diamond" a song recorded by Kylie Minogue from her 2007 album X (Kylie Minogue album)
- White Diamond (a hard rock/heavy metal band) with Ian Stuart Donaldson
- White Diamond, a character in the television series Steven Universe

== Other uses ==
- White Diamonds, a fragrance by Elizabeth Taylor
