= Flask =

Flask may refer to:

== Container ==
- Hip flask, a small container used to carry liquid
- Laboratory flask, laboratory glassware for holding larger volumes than simple test tubes
  - Erlenmeyer flask, a common laboratory flask with a flat bottom, a conical body, and a cylindrical neck
- Vacuum flask, a container designed to keep warm drinks warm and refrigerated drinks cold

== Other ==
- Flask (metal casting), a containing frame without a top or bottom, with sides only, used to hold molding sand
- Flask (web framework), a web framework for the Python programming language
- Powder flask, a small container for gunpowder
- FLASK, the Flux Advanced Security Kernel, an operating system security architecture
- Flask (unit), a unit used in UK avoirdupois weight to measure the element mercury
- The Flask, Hampstead, a Grade II listed public house at 14 Flask Walk, Hampstead, London
- The Flask, Highgate, a Grade II listed public house at 74–76 Highgate West Hill, Highgate, London
- Flask Walk, a street in Hampstead, London

== See also ==
- Lagena (disambiguation), a word derived from the Greek meaning flask
