= Way Bandy =

American make-up artist (1941–1986)

- Born: Ronald Duane Wright; August 9, 1941; Birmingham, Alabama, U.S.
- Died: August 13, 1986 (aged 45); New York City, U.S.
- Education: Birmingham–Southern College; Tennessee Technological University
- Occupation: Make-up artist
- Years active: 1966–1986
- Partner: Michael Gardine (1973–1985)

Way Bandy (August 9, 1941 – August 13, 1986) was an American make-up artist. During the 1970s, Bandy became one of the most well known and highest paid make-up artists in the fashion industry. Photographer and frequent collaborator Francesco Scavullo called Bandy "one of the great makeup artists of our time."

== Early life ==
Bandy was born Ronald Duane Wright in Birmingham, Alabama, the second of three sons of a middle-class family. Bandy later admitted that his childhood was difficult as he was not interested in "traditional masculine things—fishing, hunting, baseball" like his brothers. As a child, Bandy preferred to read, sew and take piano lessons. His love of movie magazines and the stars featured in the pages led him to begin portrait paintings. He said, "I would make them up the way I thought they should look. That's how I learned about cosmetics—it's a direct outgrowth of my painting."

After high school, Bandy attended Birmingham–Southern College where he was a member of the Pi Kappa Alpha fraternity. After two years, he dropped out to work as a department store model. He later enrolled in Tennessee Technological University where he earned a degree in education. Upon graduation, he got a job teaching elementary and high school English in Tennessee and then in Maryland. During this period, Bandy got married. In the summer of 1965, he and his wife visited New York City. Bandy later said, "The minute we arrived I knew I would never go back to my former life. This was a new beginning." Bandy quit his teaching job and he and his wife separated.

== Career ==
After moving to New York City in 1966, Bandy enrolled at the Christine Valmy Beauty School. It was there that he learned about proper skin cleansing and structure and became interested in makeup application. Bandy then became the school's "dermaspecialist" and was later assigned to teach makeup application techniques to students. The school was one of the first in New York to offer such a course.

Around this time, Bandy set about reinventing himself. He underwent a nose job and face lift and capped his teeth. He also changed his name to "Way Bandy" explaining, "The name just came into my consciousness." After his reinvention, Bandy never publicly discussed the details of his previous life and refused to reveal his birth name or real age. In 1969, Bandy was hired as the makeup director at Charles of the Ritz where he met photographer Francesco Scavullo. Scavullo was impressed by Bandy's "face designing" techniques and the two became frequent collaborators. In 1971, he left Charles of the Ritz to do makeup for the Broadway show No, No, Nanette. After the show closed, Bandy began working as a freelance makeup artist for print, television and films. Bandy's work was featured in editorials for Vogue, Cosmopolitan, Harper's Bazaar and Rolling Stone. He also worked with several noted photographers including Scavullo, Richard Avedon, Hiro, Horst P. Horst, Helmut Newton, Irving Penn, and Victor Skrebneski.

Bandy's career took off when he and hairstylist Maury Hopson transformed Martha Beall Mitchell, the wife of United States Attorney General John N. Mitchell, during a photo session with Francesco Scavullo for New York magazine. Bandy's emphasis on skin care (he used cold pressed avocado or olive oil to cleanse client's faces) and natural makeup he created and mixed himself made him a favorite among celebrities. Over the course of his career, Bandy was hired by Catherine Deneuve, Farrah Fawcett (Bandy did her makeup for the 1978 film Somebody Killed Her Husband), Elizabeth Taylor, Cher, Diana Ross, Lee Radziwill, Gloria Vanderbilt, Crystal Gayle, Donna Summer and Barbra Streisand. In 1976, Margaux Hemingway requested that he be her personal makeup artist for her film debut in the thriller Lipstick. Bandy also appeared in the film as a makeup artist. Bandy also did work for commercials and television. By the late 1970s, Bandy was charging $2,000 a session for makeup application and earned over $100,000 a year.

In 1977, Random House published Bandy's first book, Designing Your Face: An Illustrated Guide to Using Cosmetics. The book includes step by step techniques that teach Bandy's signature style of heavy, yet clean and all natural makeup application. The book became a best seller. In 1982, Random House released his second book, Styling Your Face: An Illustrated Guide to 15 Cosmetic Face Designs for Women and Men. Four months before his death, he did then First Lady Nancy Reagan's makeup for a photo spread that appeared in the September 1986 edition of Harper's Bazaar.

== Personal life ==
Bandy separated from his wife in 1965, but the two never divorced. He began a long-term relationship with writer and antiques dealer Michael Gardine in 1973. The two shared an apartment in New York City and owned homes in Nantucket and Key West, Florida. They remained together until Gardine's death from AIDS in 1985.

== Illness and death ==
By the mid-1980s, the AIDS epidemic was spreading throughout the United States and would claim the lives of many fashion industry figures. Bandy's friend, hairstylist Maury Hopson, later said that he and Bandy became fearful of contracting the disease after both had what Hobson described as a "running crazy period". The two, who had never been romantically involved, decided to become celibate and adopted a macrobiotic diet to help boost their immune systems. Bandy was already a well known devotee to naturopathy, iridology, and vegetarianism after he contracted pneumonia and pleurisy in 1962. He routinely soaked organic vegetables in a solution of bleach and distilled water (one half teaspoon in a gallon of water) believing that "Clorox raises its energy level and removes insecticides." He also requested bottled water when he was on tour promoting his book as he believed tap water contained impurities.

Intensely private about his personal life, Bandy never publicly revealed that he had contracted AIDS sometime in the early 1980s, fearing the stigma of the disease would cause him to lose work. He and friend Maury Hobson had previously discussed their displeasure with the way that designer Perry Ellis' AIDS-related death had been handled and promised each other that if either died of the disease, their true cause of death would be publicly announced. In June 1986, Bandy developed a persistent cough and sore throat but refused to see a doctor because he did not trust them. He instead opted to treat his ailments with natural remedies which did not help. Bandy's health continued to decline.

On August 6, 1986, Bandy was scheduled to do makeup for a photo shoot at Francesco Scavullo's studio. When he arrived at the studio, he was too exhausted and delirious to work. Concerned about her client's declining health, Bandy's agent Helen Murray called former Vogue editor-in-chief Grace Mirabella for advice. Mirabella contacted her husband, a doctor, who convinced Bandy to check into the hospital. Bandy relented and checked into New York Hospital-Cornell Medical Center the following day.

On August 13, Bandy died of AIDS-related pneumocystis carinii pneumonia at the age of 45. He was cremated and a memorial service was later held in Manhattan. His ashes, along with the ashes of his lover Michael Gardine, were later scattered in a pine forest in Key West, Florida by his friend and estate executor Maury Hobson. Per his request, Bandy's cause of death was identified as AIDS-related in his obituary. He also requested that no survivors be named.

== Legacy ==
Way Bandy has been cited as one of the first well known makeup artists. Hairstylist and friend Maury Hobson noted that before Bandy began his career, models applied their own makeup for photo shoots. Hobson stated, "He put make-up artists into another category. [...] He defined the career." Bandy's signature techniques influenced a generation of makeup artists including Kevyn Aucoin who cited Bandy as his personal hero.

Bandy is commemorated in the AIDS Quilt.

== Bibliography ==
- Designing Your Face: An Illustrated Guide to Using Cosmetics. Random House. 1977. ISBN 0-394-41908-1.
- Styling Your Face: An Illustrated Guide to 15 Cosmetic Face Designs for Women and Men. Random House. 1982. ISBN 0-394-51669-9.
