= Fragrance wheel =

Diagram used in winemaking and perfumery

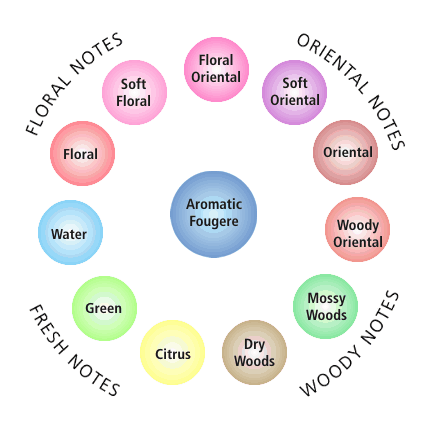
The Fragrance Wheel, ver. 1983

A fragrance wheel also known as aroma wheel, fragrance circle, perfume wheel or smell wheel, is a circular diagram showing the inferred relationships among olfactory groups based upon similarities and differences in their odor. The groups bordering one another are implied to share common olfactory characteristics. Fragrance wheel is frequently used as a classification tool in oenology and perfumery.

The first example of a fragrance wheel was conceived by Austrian perfumer Paul Jellinek and titled the Odor Effects Diagram, published in the original German edition of his book The Practice of Modern Perfumery (1949). Other notable versions include the Fragrance Circle, developed in 1979 by U. Harder at Haarman & Reimer, the Wine Aroma Wheel, from 1984 by sensory chemist Ann C. Noble, and the Fragrance Wheel, created in 1992 by perfumery taxonomist Michael Edwards.

== Fragrance Families and Personality ==
Various suggestions have been put forth about the relationship between a person's favorite scent family and their personality. Stephen V. Dowthwaite, founder of PerfumersWorld, claimed that "Our choices in perfume are influenced by [...] the image we want to portray." According to Dowthwaite, very feminine personalities gravitate toward Florals family while very masculine personalities prefer the Woody family. Young people tend to like fruity, creamy, and vanilla scents, young adults prefer citrus and metallic scents, and mature adults enjoy heavy white flowers and Chypres. Elegant, sophisticated personalities enjoy aldehydes, powdery notes and leathers, while earthy, practical personalities prefer tobacco, spice and green notes.

== Michael Edwards's Fragrance Wheel ==
Developed by a perfume expert to help retailers and consumers, Edwards's wheel consists of a primary scent family (Woody, Floral, Amber, Fresh.), divided into subfamilies (Floral Amber, Soft Amber, Aromatic, Citrus) . Many of the subfamilies were in turn again divided into Fresh, Crisp, Classical, and Rich composition gradings. Prior to 2010 Fougère group was placed at the center of this wheel.

In this classification scheme, Chanel No.5, which is traditionally classified as a "Floral Aldehyde" would be located under Soft Floral sub-group, and "Amber" scents would be placed within the Oriental group. As a class, Chypres are more difficult to place since they would be located under parts of the Oriental and Woody families. For instance, Guerlain Mitsouko, which is classically identified as a chypre will be placed under Mossy Woods, but Hermès Rouge, a chypre with more floral character, would be placed under Floral Oriental. Originally they are:

1983 version
Fougère	Floral	Floral
Fougère	Floral	Soft Floral
Fougère	Floral	Floral Oriental
Fougère	Oriental	Soft Oriental
Fougère	Oriental	Oriental
Fougère	Oriental	Woody Oriental
Fougère	Woody	Mossy Woods
Fougère	Woody	Dry Woods
Fougère	Fresh	Citrus
Fougère	Fresh	Green
Fougère	Fresh	Water

With the publication of Fragrances of the World 2008, two new sub-groups: Woods and Fruity, have been added to the wheel.

2008 version
Fougère	Floral	Floral
Fougère	Floral	Soft Floral
Fougère	Floral	Floral Oriental
Fougère	Oriental	Soft Oriental
Fougère	Oriental	Oriental
Fougère	Oriental	Woody Oriental
Fougère	Woody	Woods
Fougère	Woody	Mossy Woods
Fougère	Woody	Dry Woods
Fougère	Fresh	Citrus
Fougère	Fresh	Fruity
Fougère	Fresh	Green
Fougère	Fresh	Water

The chart was again modified in 2010, moving the Aromatics section to in between Dry Woods and Citrus to synchronize the official chart with recent studies on smell perception. The groupings are rough, and overlapped according to different sources. This chart aims to synthesize those groupings into an organized structural format. There are examples provided for each subfamily for what the scents are similar to.

2010 version
Families	Subfamilies	Examples
Floral	Floral	Fresh cut; flowers
Floral	Soft Floral	Aldehydes; powdery notes
Floral	Floral Amber	Orange blossom; sweet spices
Amber (or previously Oriental)	Soft Amber	Incense; amber
Amber (or previously Oriental)	Amber	Oriental; resins
Amber (or previously Oriental)	Woody Amber	Sandalwood; Patchouli
Woody	Woods	Aromatic woods; vetiver
Woody	Mossy Woods	Oakmoss; amber
Woody	Dry Woods	Dry woods; leather
Fresh	Aromatic	Lavender; aromatic herbs
Fresh	Citrus	Bergamot; citrus oils
Fresh	Water	Marine; aquatic notes
Fresh	Green	Galbanum; green notes
Fresh	Fruity	Berries; fruits

== See also ==
- Perfumes: The Guide
- Gourmand
- Wine tasting
- Electronic nose
