= Fragrances of the World =

1984 publication classifying perfumes

- Fragrances of the World, 2015 edition
- Editor: Michael Edwards
- Original title: The Fragrance Manual
- Language: English, French
- Subject: Fragrance classification
- Genre: Reference guide
- Publisher: Fragrances of the World
- Publication date: 1984 –
- Publication place: Australia
- Media type: Print, Online
- Website: fragrancesoftheworld.com

Fragrances of the World is the largest independent guide to fragrance classification. First published in 1984 by Michael Edwards in Sydney, Australia, the guide was originally named The Fragrance Manual before becoming Fragrances of the World in 2000. It has since been printed annually in a bilingual English-French edition. An online companion, the Fragrances of the World database, was launched in 2004 and, as of 2015, profiles over 16,000 perfumes, updated weekly. Fragrances of the World is considered a standard encyclopedic reference within the fragrance industry, colloquially termed the “Fragrance Bible” (a registered trademark since 2011).

== Entries ==
Some 8,000 perfumes were profiled in the 2015 printed edition of Fragrances of the World, accompanied by brand name, date, fragrance family and gender. The online database, updated weekly, archives profiles of over 17,000 perfumes, listing brand name, corporate group, creative director, gender, perfumer, date, country of origin, bottle designer, fragrance family, an image, an olfactory pyramid and a pronunciation guide.

The Fragrances of the World database attempts to list all perfumes currently on the market, anywhere in the world. Each listing's profile is written by the guide's editorial team, who evaluate the perfume in collaboration with the fragrance's perfumer and house evaluator.

If a mass-market perfume is discontinued, it remains listed in the guide for another two years, excluding fragrances deemed to be of outstanding influence, which are therefore maintained. Over 3,000 discontinued perfumes considered to be of exceptional popularity or historical importance have also been added to the listing.

The guide is independently published by Fragrances of the World, funded by individual subscriptions. In the interest of neutrality, the guide contains no advertising and listings are made free of charge. However, the fragrance houses are not systematically consulted, and the content is often invented.

== History ==
=== Print edition ===
In 1984, Michael Edwards, having left Halston as international marketing director, was aware of the need for a guide to help retailers suggest perfumes to consumers. Though Edwards had previously tried to re-establish Firmenich’s defunct classification Bouquet de la Parfumerie, the leading manual remained Haarmann & Reimer’s Guide to Fragrance Ingredients, an essentially technical genealogy unsuited to retail.

That year in Sydney, Edwards independently published The Fragrance Manual, the first retailer’s guide to fragrance classification, profiling three hundred perfumes. The manual proved a success, going through several editions, and was expanded at the request of Nordstrom, first to include American fragrances, followed by men’s fragrances and niche brands.

The manual’s original linear, sectional layout, traditional to fragrance classifications, presented certain limitations. Consumer preferences, Edwards felt, did not necessarily fall into a particular olfactory group (floral, oriental, woody, etc), and could span two or more groups if linked by similar subgroups (i.e. soft florals being akin to floral orientals). This he addressed in the 1992 edition of The Fragrance Manual, the first to feature an annular taxonomy known as the ‘fragrance wheel’, which organized olfactory groups in relation to one another while showing their interchange. The fragrance wheel proved a major innovation in perfume classification, its design copied widely throughout the fragrance industry.

In 2000, The Fragrance Manual was renamed Fragrances of the World. The printed guide has since been published annually in a bilingual English-French edition.

=== Online database ===
The Fragrances of the World online database was launched in 2004, accessible by paid subscription. Due to its weekly updates and comprehensive scope (profiling over 17,000 perfumes in 2015), the database has largely superseded the guide's printed edition.

== Applications ==
Fragrance Finder, an application based on The Fragrance Manual designed to recommend perfumes according to consumer preferences, was originally developed for Sephora without success. The application was instead sold independently to retailers in 1994 on CD-ROM, before appearing online in 2006.

== Criticisms ==
While Fragrances of the World has largely been adopted as a standard reference in the fragrance industry, the guide has also been subject to criticism. As an independent publication, the guide's fragrance classifications are sometimes discordant with those of the perfume houses, and the creations are sometimes attributed to the wrong perfumer, causing debate. Its simplistic categories, largely devised for retail, differ from the complex subgroups featured in smaller technical manuals such as the Classification officielle des parfums et terminologie (also created in 1984), published by the French Society of Perfumers. Its content is also limited in comparison with free resources such as Basenotes, Fragrantica or Perfume Intelligence, though it is considerably more accurate.

== See also ==
- Michael Edwards (fragrance expert)
- Fragrance wheel
- Perfume
- Perfumer
- Perfumerie
