= Y (fragrance) =

Men's fragrance line by Yves Saint Laurent

Fragrance by Yves Saint Laurent
- Designed for: Men
- Released: 2017
- Label: Yves Saint Laurent
- Perfumer(s): Dominique Ropion
- Concentration: Eau de toilette
- Awards: Fragrance Foundation Award (2018)

Y is a line of men's fragrances by the French fashion house Yves Saint Laurent. The original eau de toilette, composed by Dominique Ropion, was released in August 2017, and an eau de parfum followed in 2018. The eau de parfum won Fragrance of the Year, Men's Prestige, at the 2018 Fragrance Foundation Awards.

== Background ==
Yves Saint Laurent's first fragrance was also called Y, a women's scent launched in 1964. The designer described his intention as creating "a lush, heavy, and languid perfume", conceived as a complement to his couture. The 2017 men's line is a separate product that reuses the name.

== Launch ==
Y was released as an eau de toilette in August 2017. It was composed by Dominique Ropion, with top notes of bergamot, sage and ginger over a base of balsam fir, cedarwood and ambergris. The house presented it around the contrast of a white T-shirt and a black jacket, summarised in the campaign line "Y is Yves. Y is the question. Y is you." The launch campaign was created by the advertising agency BETC.

An eau de parfum concentration followed in 2018.

== Flankers and later releases ==
The line has since been extended with Y Le Parfum and, in 2023, Y Eau de Parfum Intense, which added juniper berries, French lavender, patchouli and cedarwood to the original composition.

== Campaigns ==
The musician Lenny Kravitz became the global ambassador for Y, fronting campaigns for the eau de parfum, the eau de toilette, Le Parfum and, in 2023, the Eau de Parfum Intense. Speaking about the line, Kravitz said that "fragrance is an extension of my surroundings and how I am feeling", and that "reinvention is part of one's evolution".

== Awards ==
Year	Award	Category	Result	Ref.
2018	Fragrance Foundation Awards	Fragrance of the Year – Men's Prestige	Won	
