= Jazz (perfume) =

Men's perfume by Yves Saint Laurent

Jazz is a perfume for men by Yves Saint Laurent introduced in 1988. The black and white packaging and flacon were designed to resemble piano keys. A flanker Live Jazz was introduced in 1998.
