= Lagena =

Lagena, a term derived from the Greek word meaning flask, refer to:

- Lagena (anatomy), a structure of the inner ear in humans and animals
- Lagena (foraminifera), a genus of foraminiferans
- Lagena (oomycete), a genus of oomycetes
