= Lagena radicicola =

Scientific classification
- Domain: Eukaryota
- Clade: Sar
- Clade: Stramenopiles
- Phylum: Oomycota
- Class: Peronosporomycetes
- Order: Peronosporales
- Family: Pythiaceae
- Genus: Lagena; Vanterp. & Ledingham (1930)
- Species: L. radicicola

Binomial name
- Lagena radicicola Vanterp. & Ledingham (1930)

Synonyms
- Lagenocystis radicicola (Vanterp. & Ledingham) H.F. Copel. (1956)

Pathogenic oomycete

Lagena radicicola is an oomycete plant pathogen that was described from the roots of wheat, barley, and rye from a field in Saskatchewan in 1930 by Vanterpool and Ledingham. Thalli grow inside the root cells; they are tubular, unbranched, and highly variable in size. Thalli give rise to sporangia, which either release zoospores into a vesicle exterior to the plant cell or into the plant cell. Zoospores are reniform to pyrifom and biflagellate with an anterior flagellum covered with mastigonemes and a posterior whiplash flagellum.

In 1956, Copeland moved Lagena radicicola to Lagenocystis because of the existence of Lagena Parker & Jones—a name applied to a foraminiferan. However, foraminiferan names are governed by the International Code of Zoological Nomenclature and oomycete names are governed by International Code of Nomenclature for algae, fungi, and plants. Therefore, the move was unnecessary and Lagenocystis (Vanterp. & Ledingham) H. F. Copel. is a superfluous synonym.
