= Michael Edwards (fragrance expert) =

British fragrance taxonomist

- Michael Edwards, 2014
- Born: Michael Anthony Edwards; 10 December 1943 (age 82); Zomba, Nyasaland
- Occupations: Fragrance expert, author, editor
- Writing career
- Notable works: Fragrances of the World; Perfume Legends; Perfume Legends II; American Legends

Michael Anthony Edwards (10 December 1943) is a British fragrance taxonomist, historian, and founding editor of Fragrances of the World, the largest guide to perfume classification. His lectures and writings, including the book Perfume Legends: French Feminine Fragrances, pioneered critical scholarship on the history of perfumery, while his fragrance wheel marked a major innovation in perfume retail. He resides in Australia, France, and the United States.

== Early life and career ==
Michael Edwards was born on 10 December 1943 in Zomba, Nyasaland (present-day Malawi). After attending school in the United Kingdom and Rhodesia, he briefly studied biochemistry at the University of Natal before accepting a marketing job in London at the Beecham Group, specializing in toiletries. Edwards later moved to Paris to join Norton Simon as the international marketing director for Halston.

== Publication of Fragrances of the World ==
By 1984, Michael Edwards, then working in Sydney, was aware of the need for a guide to help retailers suggest perfumes to consumers. That year, Edwards independently published The Fragrance Manual, the first retailer's guide to fragrance classification. The manual proved a success, going through several editions, and was expanded at the request of Nordstrom, first to include American fragrances, followed by men's fragrances and niche brands.

The 1992 edition of The Fragrance Manual was the first to feature a "fragrance wheel". This annular taxonomy organized fragrance families in relation to one another, showing their interchange, a system better suited to retail than the linear, sectional genealogy used in previous editions. It was widely adopted in the industry.

Renamed Fragrances of the World in 2000 and published annually, Edwards’ guide has become an authoritative reference in the fragrance industry, colloquially termed the 'Fragrance Bible'. Its online database, updated weekly, archives profiles of over 16,000 fragrances.

== Publication of Perfume Legends ==
In 1990, Michael Edwards proposed to perfumer Guy Robert, president of the French Society of Perfumers, the creation of a book detailing the history of French feminine perfume, drawing from interviews to be held with famous perfumers. This was to be a novel effort, as perfumers rarely discussed their work publicly, instead preferring the secrecy traditional to the fragrance industry. Robert agreed to lend his support, becoming, alongside perfumer Edmond Roudnitska, a key advocate on Edwards’ behalf.

Over the course of six years, Edwards interviewed some 150 perfumers, couturiers, bottle designers, and industry executives, while gaining unprecedented access to private and corporate archives. The resulting book was titled Perfume Legends: French Feminine Fragrances (1996). This was substantially revised and expanded to create Perfume Legends II in 2019, which was followed by American Legends: The Evolution of American Fragrances in 2024.

== See also ==
- Fragrances of the World
- Fragrance wheel
- Halston
- History of perfume
- Perfume
- Perfumer
- Edmond Roudnitska
- White Africans of European ancestry
