= Stephen Dowthwaite =

Stephen V. Dowthwaite
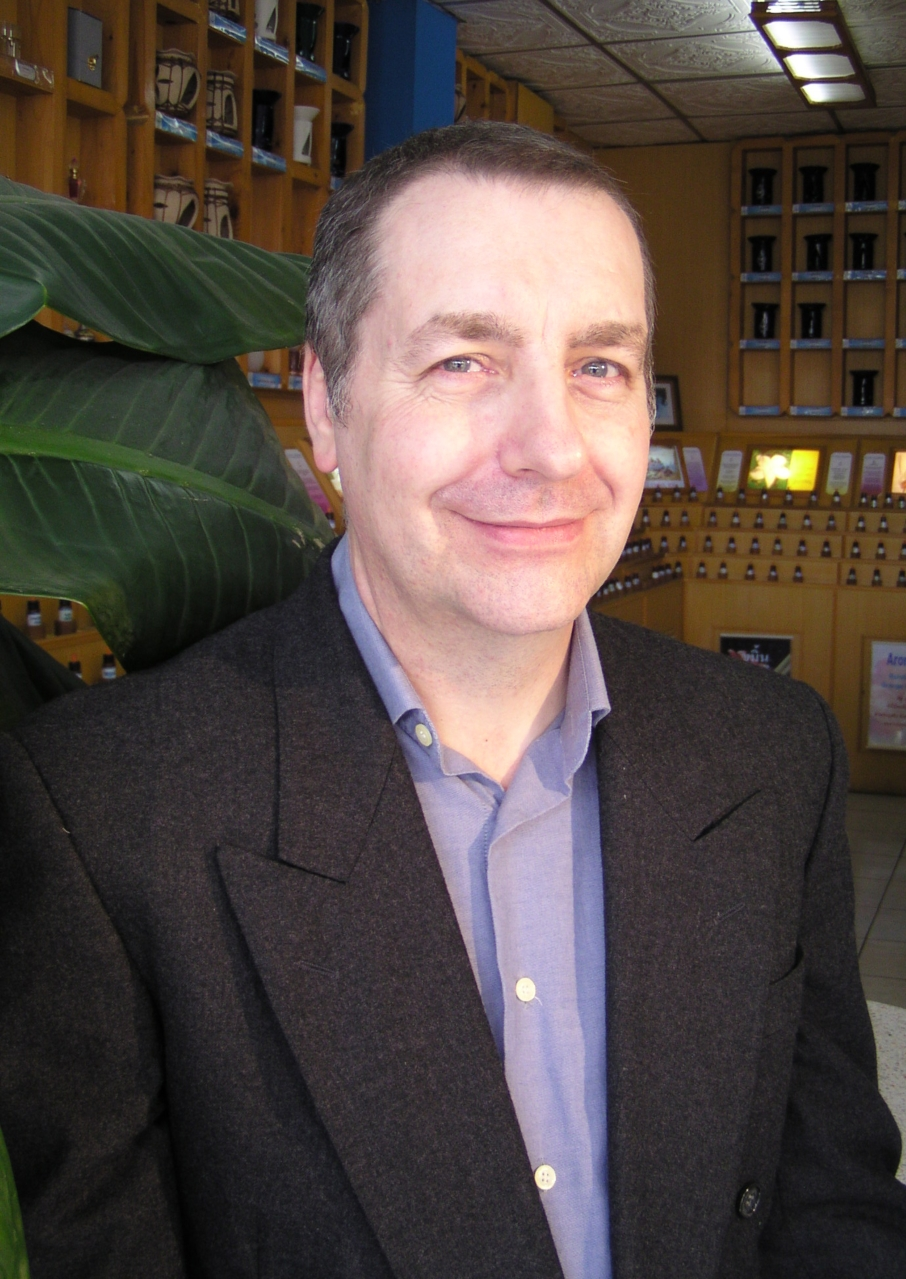
- Born: 1956 (age 69–70); England
- Occupations: perfumer, educator, programmer, writer

Stephen V. Dowthwaite (born 1956) is an English perfumer, perfumery educator, programmer and writer. He is the founder of PerfumersWorld, a resource for professional perfumers. He is known for developing The ABC's of Perfumery, a comprehensive system of odour classification and perfume creation, and a training course in The Art and Technology of Perfumery.

== Background ==
In 1971 Dowthwaite started as an apprentice at Picot Laboratories in London, England. Picot was one of the last perfume houses in the UK to create, compound, package and distribute their own fragrances. He trained under the perfumer Kenneth Burrows, and ex-Guerlain compounder Brian Maquaire. He later worked in milled soap manufacture and became manager of the cosmetic chemistry department of Grossmiths Co. Ltd. From there went on to become a perfumer at R. Sarant & Co. Ltd. and then Norda Schimmel Co. Ltd. Between 1979 and 1988 he had two careers, as a London Metropolitan Police officer and a freelance perfumer working with several companies, notably Quintessence Fragrances Ltd., suppliers to the Body Shop and Cosmetics-To-Go (now Lush).

He states that police training was a major influence on his perfumery career using the systems he had learned as a policeman and applying them to perfumery creation and manufacture. Using a fusion of this systematic approach to perfumery with computer programming wrote the perfume creation software "The Perfumer's Workbook" which generates perfume formulations from odour descriptions.

In 1989, Dowthwaite moved to Bangkok, Thailand and set up agencies for Quintessence Fragrances Ltd., including training the sales staff of agents. In 1991, he set up the fragrance division of Adinop Co. Ltd., the first perfume compounding facility in Thailand, using a forerunner of the ABC's of Perfumery system for creation and manufacture. From 1996 under the sponsorship of The National Science and Technology Development Agency Dowthwaite worked with Thai-China Flavors and Fragrances Co. Ltd. and Guanghouz Baihua Flavours and Fragrances Co. Ltd. as assistant director, perfumer, technical consultant and trainer.

== PerfumersWorld ==
In 1998, he formed PerfumersWorld to distribute the newly launched The Perfumer's Workbook. Due to the high demand for more information about perfumery creation, launched a series of e-learning and university courses and later workshops in The Art and Technology of Perfumery.

As of 2014, Dowthwaite has over 300 fragrances currently on the market, most of which are for toiletries, cosmetics and functional products. He is the creator of the Fleuressence range of speciality bases used in the "iSniffs" 7-step perfume creation system. He is also responsible for many natural aromatherapy blends used in spas and wellness products in over 30 countries.

== Articles ==
- An introduction to the ABC's of Perfumery and The Art and Technology of Perfumery. Stephen V. Dowthwaite. pub. PerfumersWorld Ltd. Partnership 1998. (3rd Edition 2012).
- The Art and Technology of Perfumery. Private Publication 2000–2014. (14th Edition 2014). Stephen V. Dowthwaite. PerfumersWorld
- The Perfumer’s Workbook. Computer Software 1998–2014. (14th Edition 2014). Stephen V. Dowthwaite. perfumersworld.com
- Training the ABC’s of Perfumery. Stephen V. Dowthwaite. Perfumer & Flavorist, Allured Publications, May/June 1999
- The Grammar of Perfumery. Stephen V. Dowthwaite. Perfumer & Flavorist, Allured Publications, 2004
- Solutions – Solutions or Problems. Stephen V. Dowthwaite. Perfumer & Flavorist, Allured Publications. 2000
- Using the Brain (Not the Nose) to Smell. Stephen V. Dowthwaite. Perfumer & Flavorist, Allured Publications Dec. 2009
- Making Sense (and scents) of Aroma Chemical. Names Stephen V. Dowthwaite. Perfumer & Flavorist, Allured Publications, June 2010
- What is perfume? Stephen V. Dowthwaite. Perfumer & Flavorist, Allured Publications, July 2010
- Global Cosmetics Industry Perfume by Stephen Dowthwaite. GCI Magazine, November 2010
