= Flacon =

Small, often decorative, bottle

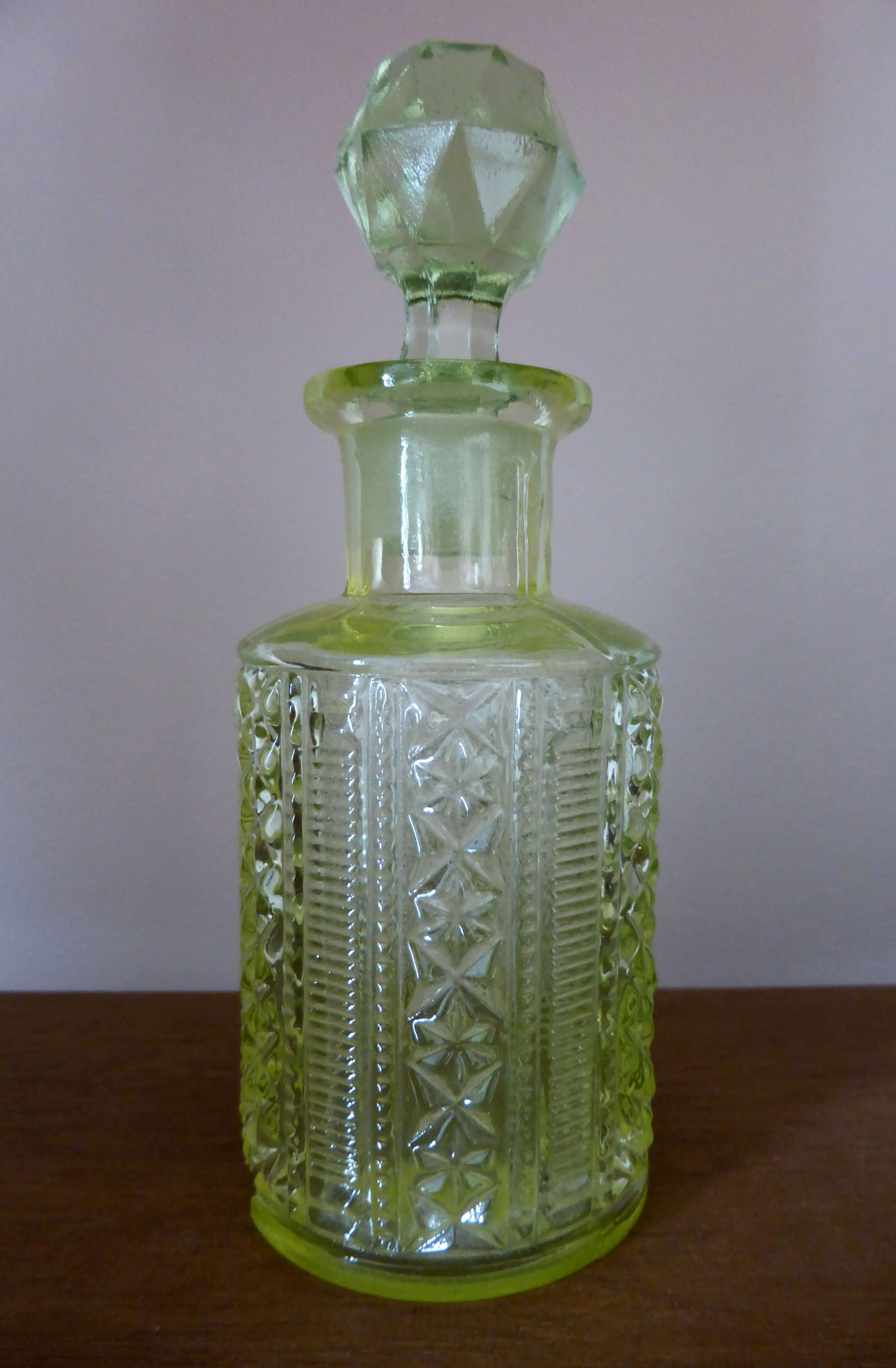
A uranium glass flacon

A flacon (from Late Latin flasco, meaning "bottle"; cf. "flagon") is a small, often decorative, bottle. It has an opening seal or stopper and is designed to hold valuable liquids which may deteriorate upon contact with the air. They are widespread in the food industry, the pharmaceutical industry, and the cosmetics industry. They are generally made of glass for perfumes, but can also be made out of plastics for other uses.

== Manufacturing techniques ==
The plastic bottles can be manufactured using different processes depending on the size and the proposed application (i.e. what the content will be, what the surrounding environment will be etc.). A common technique is blow molding. Like any object made by extrusion, it is possible to produce multilayer plastic bottles. This is called coextrusion. The combination of different materials or colours can be used to produce flacons with different properties, such as: impermeability to light, oxygen, recycled inner layer. The glass bottles are manufactured by blow molding.

== In popular culture ==
Charles Baudelaire wrote a poem about the flacon, entitled Le Flacon (The Perfume Flask).

== See also ==
- Vial

Other words derived from flasco:

- Flagon
- Flask (disambiguation)
