= Demeter Fragrance Library =

American fragrance company

- Trade name: The Library of Fragrance (in Europe)
- Founded: 1993
- Founder: Christopher Brosius; Christopher Gable
- Headquarters: Great Neck, New York, U.S.
- Area served: Worldwide
- Key people: Mark Crames (manager since 2002)
- Products: Colognes, body lotions, shower gels, exfoliant scrubs, room sprays
- Brands: Demeter, The Library of Fragrance, Jelly Belly Collection
- Owner: Freedom Marketing Group (since 2002)

The Demeter Fragrance Library (called The Library of Fragrance in Europe) is a Great Neck, New York company that sells over 200 different fragrances based on "everyday" scents, such as baby powder, dirt, gin & tonic, play-doh and tomato.

== History ==
Demeter was founded by ex-Kiehl's perfumer Christopher Brosius, and Christopher Gable in 1993, as a project to "bottle" everyday odors into wearable personal colognes. The first three colognes that were created – Dirt, Grass and Tomato – were launched at New York department store Henri Bendel in 1996. The three scents sold well, which led to further introductions of fragrances such as Gin & Tonic, Baby Powder and Play-Doh.

Brosius and Gable sold Demeter Fragrance Library in 2002 to the Freedom Marketing Group. Mark Crames became the manager.

In 2007 Demeter introduced the Jelly Belly Collection (based on Jelly Belly jelly bean recipes), Crayon, Pure Soap, and Egg Nog.

In 2015, Demeter launched in the United Kingdom as the Library of Fragrance, because the name "Demeter," which references the ancient Greek goddess of the harvest, was already in use by another company. That year, Demeter/The Library of Fragrance launched Mountain Air, a scent representing the air of Alaska.

Actor Clint Eastwood and supermodel Kate Moss have both claimed to wear Demeter's Dirt, while actress Drew Barrymore wears Gin and Tonic.

In 2016, Demeter products were sold in about 35 countries. In the UK, over 100 fragrances are available from the Library of Fragrance website, and the brand's best-sellers can be found at over 1000 Boots stores across the UK and ROI.

== Product description ==
Demeter fragrances are cologne concentration (2-4% perfume oil within the carrier of alcohol), as opposed to more commonly seen fragrance formats, such as eau de toilette or eau de parfum, which have a higher ratio of perfume oil to alcohol and may therefore last longer on the skin.

Some of the better known fragrances are Angel Food, Baby Powder, Carrot, Cosmopolitan Cocktail, Leather, Paperback, Play-Doh (created in 2006 to mark Play-Doh's 50th anniversary), Riding Crop, Sushi, Pipe Tobacco, Turpentine, Snow, Lime, and Golden Delicious Apple. The fragrances in the line can be combined and layered together so that wearers can create their own fragrances.

Besides its cologne sprays, Demeter Fragrance Library makes other products scented with the same fragrances, including body lotions, shower gels, exfoliant scrubs and room sprays.
