= Prince Matchabelli =

American perfume line

Prince Matchabelli perfume, 1926 design

Prince Matchabelli is a perfume line, first designed by Prince Georges V. Matchabelli who was an amateur chemist. Matchabelli was born in Georgia within the Russian Empire but when the Czarists fell Georgia seceded. From 1918 until 1921 Georgia was an independent country and established diplomatic relations abroad. In 1921 the Russian SFSR invaded Georgia and absorbed it as a Socialist Republic. Georges Matchabelli was a Georgian prince and Georgian ambassador to Italy, but fled the Soviet Union and emigrated to the United States after the Russian Revolution. In New York City he and his wife, Princess Norina Matchabelli (an actress whose stage name was Maria Carmi), opened a small antiques shop, Le Rouge et le Noir, at 545 Madison Avenue. The name came from Stendhal's novel of that name, which they interpreted as the red for the aristocracy for him and black for the religious (The Miracle, a famous religious play in which Norina had starred). (Stendhal's interpretation of the names was somewhat different: the only two choices open to his hero, Julien Sorel, a poor man for career glory and advancement—red for military and black for clergy.) They later established the Prince Matchabelli Perfume Company in 1926. Perfumes were personally blended for clients by Prince Matchabelli. The first three perfumes were Princess Norina, Queen of Georgia and Ave Maria. The company became known for the many color-coded, crown-shaped bottles designed by Norina after the Matchabelli crown and introduced in 1928 with labels on the underside, which were made by another Georgian George Coby.

In 1936 Princess Matchabelli sold the company to perfume manufacturer Saul Ganz for $250,000. Ganz then named his son Paul H. Ganz president of the company. In 1941 Prince Matchabelli was sold to Vicks Chemical Company. In 1958, Vicks sold Prince Matchabelli to Chesebrough–Pond's. Chesebrough-Ponds was acquired by Unilever in 1987. In 1986 the division had annual domestic sales of about $140 million, according to company officials. In 1993 the Chesebrough-Ponds division of Unilever sold the Prince Matchabelli brands to Parfums de Coeur.
