= White Diamonds =

Brand of perfume

- White Diamonds fragrance

Fragrance by Elizabeth Taylor
- Released: 1991
- Label: Elizabeth Arden (IFF)
- Perfumer(s): Carlos Benaim
- Flanker(s): Sparkling White Diamonds; Brilliant White Diamonds; White Diamonds Legacy

White Diamonds is a perfume created in 1991 by the British-American actress Elizabeth Taylor. The perfume, advertised with a cinematic TV commercial starring Taylor, was an enormous and enduring commercial success, with total sales of US$1.5 billion as of 2018. Though not the first celebrity fragrance, the unprecedented success of White Diamonds popularised the trend of celebrity-branded perfumes which accelerated in the following decades.

== Background and development ==
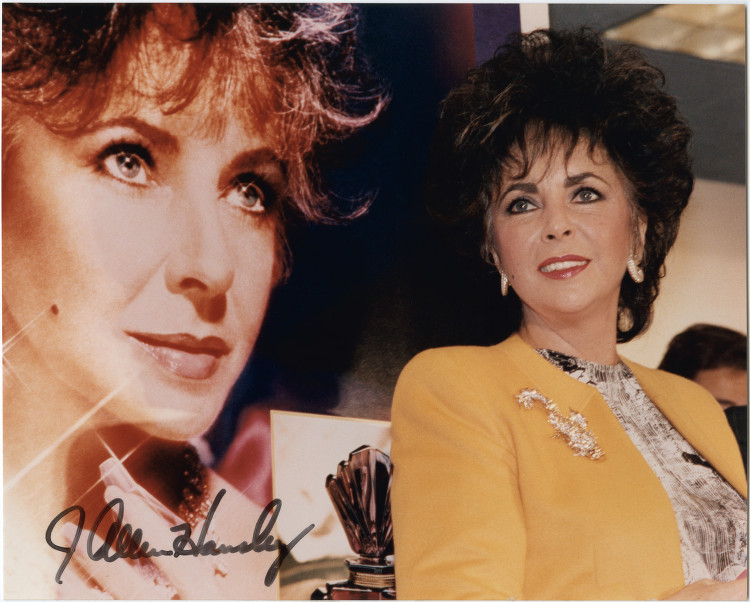
Taylor promoting her first perfume, Passion, at a Neiman Marcus department store in 1987.

White Diamonds was Taylor's second perfume, after Passion, which she introduced in 1987. Other celebrities had previously lent their name to fragrances on occasion, such as Sophia Loren, who released an eponymous perfume in 1981.

White Diamonds was released at a time when Taylor was making a comeback in the public eye. She had recently lost weight and completed a second round of treatment at the Betty Ford Center for substance abuse, where she had met Larry Fortensky, then a construction worker. Taylor would marry Fortensky in October 1991, making him her seventh (and last) husband. Joseph Ronchetti, CEO of Elizabeth Arden, proposed that the resilience Taylor had shown in her personal life made her relatable to the public, stating: "We've all known people with drinking problems, we've all had weight problems, and she's coped so beautifully."

Taylor partnered with Elizabeth Arden Inc., then a division of Parfums International (now owned by International Flavors & Fragrances), to create White Diamonds.

== Description ==
White Diamonds is a floral perfume with notes of rose, jasmine, neroli, narcissus, and Egyptian tuberose. According to an executive at Elizabeth Arden who worked with Taylor on White Diamonds, the perfume used a higher-than-normal concentration of oil (25% rather than the usual 12%) to create a heavier scent.

The perfume is sold in a bottle decorated with small imitation white diamond gemstones.

== Marketing ==
White Diamonds was accompanied by a US$20 million advertising campaign, which included a national tour of department stores by Taylor (beginning September 12, 1991), magazine advertisements, and, most notably, use of a short film.

=== Commercial ===
White Diamonds was marketed with a short film starring Taylor titled White Diamonds Starring Elizabeth Taylor. The full film, with a duration of 2 minutes and 45 seconds, was screened in department stores, which served popcorn to customers to enhance the theatrical effect. It was also played in movie theatres before pre-show trailers. A 60-second cut was shown as a television commercial.

The film was intended to have a cinematic feel, and was shot in black-and-white and in soft focus. It was filmed in Acapulco, Mexico, and directed by Terry Bedford of the production company Epoch Films.

The film begins with Taylor, wearing a great deal of diamond jewelry, sitting in a convertible car, watching a small airplane touch down on the beach. Some well-dressed men exit the plane and begin to play a high-stakes poker game, which Taylor observes. Eventually one of the men finds himself with insufficient funds to call a bet. Taylor tells the man "Not so fast", and removes one of her diamond earrings, tossing it into the pot and adding "These have always brought me luck". Richard Allison provided the voice over.

== Sales ==
As of 2018, total sales of White Diamonds were estimated at US$1.5 billion. Sales in 1993 were estimated at $48 million, and at $60 million in 2010.

Beginning in 2011, Taylor stipulated that 20% of all sales in perpetuity be directed to her charity, the Elizabeth Taylor AIDS Foundation.

The sales of Taylor's perfumes, particularly White Diamonds, were her principal source of income during her later life. She purportedly earned more from White Diamonds than from any of her roles in Hollywood films.

== Legacy ==
White Diamonds was named "Fragrance of the Year" by The Fragrance Foundation in 1992, and inducted in the foundation's Hall of Fame in 2009. Taylor followed up White Diamonds with several other fragrances, including a number of flanker scents such as Sparkling White Diamonds in 1999, and Brilliant White Diamonds in 2001.

In 2021, "White Diamonds Legacy" was released to mark the 30th anniversary of its first release.
