= Charles of the Ritz =

American defunct cosmetics and perfume company

- Product type: Cosmetics, perfume
- Current owner: Revlon (trademarks)
- Country: United States
- Introduced: 1926; 100 years ago
- Discontinued: 2002
- Markets: International
- Previous owners: Charles Jundt (1926–1936); Richard B. Salomon / Salomon family (1936–1971); E.R. Squibb & Sons (1971–1986); Yves Saint Laurent (1986–1987); Revlon (1987–2002)

Charles of the Ritz was an American cosmetics and perfume brand, founded in 1926 by hairdresser Charles Jundt. Once a prestigious name in the luxury beauty market, the brand was known for its individually blended face powders, its Revenescence skincare line, and fragrances including Jean Naté and Enjoli. After passing through several corporate owners, the brand was discontinued by Revlon in 2002.

== History ==
=== Origins ===
In December 1910, hairdresser Charles H. Ritz opened a barber shop and ladies' hairdressing parlour inside the newly opened Ritz-Carlton Hotel on the corner of Madison Avenue and 46th Street in Manhattan. In addition to barbering, hairdressing, and manicuring services, Ritz sold cosmetics and toiletries under his own label, including cold cream, cuticle cream, and hair tonic.

In 1919, Ritz sold his ladies' hairdressing business to his employee Charles Jundt. Jundt was born in Alsace-Lorraine (then part of Germany), later worked as a hairdresser in Paris and London, and emigrated to the United States in 1914, becoming a citizen in 1921. In 1926, Jundt began marketing beauty products under the name "Charles of the Ritz", capitalising on the prestige associated with the Ritz-Carlton Hotel. His first products included rouge and face powder. Fragrance was added to the line in 1927, with the first three perfumes simply named A, B, and C.

In September 1928, the company launched a comprehensive cosmetics line sold through retail outlets and its own salons, supported by a $250,000 advertising campaign. A significant contributor to the company's early growth was Otto J. Cohen (1888–1979), a vice president who joined in 1927. Cohen is credited with developing the Rejuvenescence Cream and the Charles of the Ritz Individual Powder Blending Service, a made-to-order face powder service that became one of the brand's signature offerings in department stores.

=== Under the leadership of Salomon (1936–1971) ===
In 1936, the company was purchased by Benjamin E. Levy and Richard B. Salomon. Salomon, a 1932 graduate of Brown University who had joined the company in 1933, became president at the age of 24.

In 1935, Charles of the Ritz launched the Jean Naté line of body splashes and fragrance, which proved to be one of the company's most enduring products. The company later acquired the cosmetics brand Alexandra de Markoff in 1949.

=== FTC action and the Revenescence rebrand ===
In 1938, the Federal Trade Commission (FTC) issued a cease and desist order against Charles of the Ritz over advertising claims made for several of its products, including the flagship Rejuvenescence Cream. The FTC ruled that the claims - that the cream could rejuvenate the skin and restore a youthful appearance - were false and misleading, as no cosmetic could achieve such results. The company was forced to rebrand the product line from "Rejuvenescence" to "Revenescence".

=== Expansion and distribution ===
Charles of the Ritz expanded its distribution from upscale salons into high-end department stores, including Saks Fifth Avenue and Neiman Marcus. The company also expanded internationally, entering the French market in 1955 and opening a salon at 51 Avenue Montaigne in Paris in 1956.

In 1961, Charles of the Ritz became a publicly traded company. The following year, it secured worldwide rights to Yves Saint Laurent perfumes and cosmetics. In 1963, the company acquired an 80 percent stake in the house of Yves Saint Laurent and launched skincare and makeup under the Yves Saint Laurent Beauté brand.

Ritz launched an entire line of skincare and makeup under the Yves Saint Laurent Beaute brand. In 1964, Charles of the Ritz merged with the Lanvin group. It was from then on known as Lanvin–Charles of the Ritz. In 1969, the makeup artist Way Bandy joined Charles of the Ritz as the salon director of makeup.

=== Ownership changes ===
In 1971, Lanvin-Charles of the Ritz was acquired by pharmaceutical company E.R. Squibb & Sons (later Squibb Corporation). Salomon continued to lead the company until his retirement in 1972. He later served as chancellor of Brown University from 1979 to 1988 and as chairman of the board of the New York Public Library from 1977 to 1981.

In 1977, Yves Saint Laurent Beaute launched Opium. In 1978, Ritz introduced a new women's fragrance, Enjoli, designed (as noted in its television commercials) as "the eight hour perfume for the 24-hour woman"; the commercial's theme song was a remake of Peggy Lee's 1963 hit song "I'm A Woman". In 1984, Charles of the Ritz launched Forever Krystle and Carrington, successful fragrances based on American television drama Dynasty characters.

In 1986, Squibb sold the entire division to the Yves Saint Laurent company for $500 million, which invested heavily in a new men's fragrance called Jazz. Jazz was not particularly successful and, coupled with the October 1987 market crash, Yves Saint Laurent sold Charles of the Ritz Incorporated (excluding Yves Saint Laurent Beaute) to Revlon in 1987. Still reeling from its unsuccessful takeover attempt of Gillette in 1983, Revlon declared it was interested in several acquisitions and also bought Max Factor, Almay, Halston, Borghese, and Germaine Monteil.

Under Revlon, the brand Charles of the Ritz began to slip in image and prestige. In 1991, it launched a line called Express, aimed at a more-savvy customer. The brand became associated with mid-price stores, including J. C. Penney, and maintained a focus on the "mature" customer. After several years of unsuccessful revival attempts (including an endorsement deal with Kathie Lee Gifford for its Timeless line) and facing massive debt, Revlon put (among many others) the line for sale, but had no takers. Analysts suggested the very name – Charles of the Ritz – lacked consumer recognition.

=== Demise ===
Revlon shut down Charles of the Ritz in 2002. Many of the former Ritz fragrances, including Enjoli, are sold today under the Revlon name.

== Fragrances ==
Below is a list of the house fragrances and their year of launch.

Fragrance name	Year of launch
A	1927
B	1927
c	1927
Jean Naté	1935
Spur	1937
Tingle	1938
Summertime	1939
Wintertime	1940
Love Potion	1941
Spring Rain	1941
Flower Show	1942
Jester	1944
Sea Shell	1944
Soignee	1944
Water Sprite	1944
An English Garden	1945
Damask	1945
Little Women	1945
Ritual	1945
Baby Pink	1947
Directoire	1948
French Provincial	1949
Floreal	1950
Country Wedding	1951
Ishah	1954
Simone Mounir	1957
Ritz (Classic)	1972
Charles of the Ritz	1977
Enjoli	1978
Charivari	1978
Aston	1979
Senchal	1981
Forever Krystle	1984
Carrington	1984
Xi'a Xi'ang	1987

== See also ==
- List of companies based in New York City
- List of perfumes
