= Norell (fragrance) =

1968 perfume by Norman Norell and Revlon

Fragrance by Norman Norell and Revlon
- Category: Green Floral
- Designed for: Women
- Top notes: Primarily green hyacinth accord and galbanum
- Heart notes: Primarily the carnation/clove scent of eugenol
- Base notes: Primarily musk and sandalwood
- Released: 1968
- Label: Norman Norell
- Perfumer(s): Joséphine Catapano
- Tagline: "Each Time is the First Time With Norell"
- Flanker(s): Norell II (1979)
- Successor: Norell New York (2015)
- Awards: 1973 FiFi Award for Best Promotion

Norell is a green floral fragrance that was released in 1968 by Norman Norell. It was a first American designer perfume: an early commercial success of a designer fragrance sold in department stores under the name of a fashion designer.

Norman Norell was friends with Revlon founder Charles Revson, and the Norell perfume was a joint venture of the two companies. Its success encouraged Revlon to add a fragrance division to their company, beginning with Charlie (1973), and led to other American fashion labels (such as Ralph Lauren, Halston, and Anne Klein) to release their own fragrances.

== Joint venture between Revlon and Norell ==
International Flavors and Fragrances (IFF) developed this fragrance for Revlon. Charles Revson chose Norman Norell for the joint venture; he and his wife Lyn Fisher Sheresky Revson admired the designer's creations.

Norell was launched with a tremendous party at Bonwit Teller after hours. Over 350 guests arrived for the fashion show, buffet, and supper dance that spilled across multiple floors in the store. The fragrance was like the clothes in at least two aspects: it sported a plain label with just the designer's name in all-capital letters, and it was expensive, at $50 per ounce (equivalent to $480 in 2026).

It grossed $1 million in sales in the first year (equivalent to $9.6 million in 2026).

== Fragrance ==
Joséphine Catapano at International Flavors & Fragrances created this fragrance and said that this was her favorite of the scents she created.

In 1966, she created the spicy green floral fragrance Fidji, which had a structure inspired by Nina Ricci L'Air du Temps (1948). Fidji in turn inspired many later perfumes, including Norell. Both fragrances share a green accord based on cis-3-hexenyl salicylate, and for Norell she added Lyral, which was then a new IFF material with a scent resembling lilac and lily of the valley. Like L'Air du Temps, the fragrance also uses benzyl salicylate for a diffusing effect of the floral bouquet.

The fragrance has fresh, green top notes; spicy, floral middle notes; and mossy, woody base notes with an ambery drydown:

Top notes
Primarily green hyacinth accord and galbanum; also aldehydes, bergamot, cardamom, coriander, lemon, mandarin, and narcissus
Middle notes
Primarily the carnation/clove scent of eugenol; also cinnamon, iris, jasmine, rose, and ylang-ylang
Base notes
Primarily musk and sandalwood; also amber, cedarwood, moss, vetiver, and ylang-ylang

Other fragrances with strong green and hyacinth notes soon followed, including: Azzaro Azzaro (1975), Elizabeth Arden Cabriole (1977), Léonard Tamango (1977), Nicky Verfaillie Grain de Sable (1977), Charles Jourdan Vôtre (1978), Krizia K de Krizia (1981), Giorgio Armani Armani (1982), Nina Ricci Fleur de Fleurs (1982), and Chanel Cristalle (1993).

== Fragrance line extensions ==
- Norell II (1979): A green, woody chypre
- Norell New York (2015): An update to the original fragrance, which kept the galbanum note but added fruity top notes, different floral middle notes, and a new orris butter base note
  - Norell Elixir (2016): Floral, woody flanker to the 2015 reformulation
  - Norell Blushing (2017): Damask rose flanker to the 2015 reformulation

== Ownership timeline ==
- 1968: Launched by Norman Norell and marketed by Revlon.
- 1971: Norell sold their share of the rights to Revlon for about $1.25 million (equivalent to $10.3 million in 2026).
- 1989: Norell was moved to Revlon's Prestige Fragrances division, an umbrella for their luxury and designer fragrances.
- 1995: Norell Fragrance Group, a private investor group led by Dennis Schnur, bought the Norell rights from Revlon.
- 1997: Five Star Fragrance bought the rights from Norell Fragrance Group and reintroduced the fragrance at Neiman Marcus counters with the "Undeniably Glamorous" ad campaign with Faye Dunaway.
- 2015: Parlux Fragrances acquired the Norell fragrances. Perfumer Celine Barel at International Flavors & Fragrances updated the fragrance, which was launched as Norell New York (2015). They would later add flankers: Norell Elixir (2016) and Norell Blushing (2017).
