= Nina Ricci =

Nina Ricci may refer to:

- Nina Ricci (designer) (1883–1970), French designer of Italian origin
- Nina Ricci (brand), a fashion house founded by Nina Ricci and her son Robert in Paris in 1932
