= Lars Nilsson (designer) =

Swedish fashion designer (born 1966)

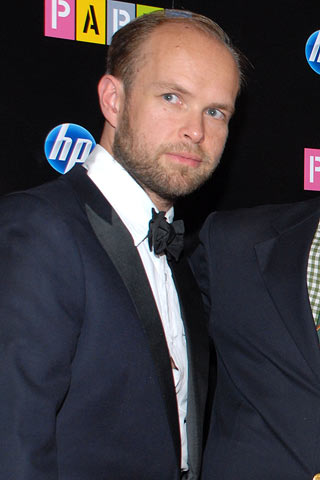
- Born: August 11, 1966 (age 60); Stockholm, Sweden
- Education: Ecole de la Chambre Syndicale de la Couture Parisienne
- Labels: Christian Lacroix, Christian Dior, Ralph Lauren, Nina Ricci, Bill Blass, Mr. Nils

Lars Nilsson (born 1966) is a Swedish fashion designer and member of the Council of Fashion Designers of America who has worked with fashion houses, including Christian Lacroix, Balmain, Christian Dior, Ralph Lauren, Bill Blass, Nina Ricci and his own menswear line, Mr. Nils.

== Career ==
=== Fashion ===
Lars Nilsson graduated from both Virginska Skolan in Sweden and Paris’ Ecole de la Chambre Syndicale de la Couture.

Following fashion school Nilsson held an apprenticeship at the tailoring atelier of Chanel haute couture before joining the fashion house Christian Lacroix. He spent nine years there as both Lacroix's personal assistant and as the senior haute couture designer. He worked directly with Lacroix on a number of books and the production of theatrical pieces.

From 1997 to 1999 Nilsson worked with John Galliano at Christian Dior Couture as Collection Coordinator of both the haute couture studio and the fur collections. Afterwards, Nilsson moved to New York to become the Design Director for the Polo Ralph Lauren women’s wear collection. From 2000 to 2003 he was Creative Director for Bill Blass Collection, designing both womenswear and menswear, and became head designer following Bill Blass's death in 2002. Anna Wintour wore one of his dresses to the Vogue Fashion Awards in October 2001, and he was named Designer of the Year 2001 by New York magazine as well as being elected to the International Best-Dressed List by Eleanor Lambert and Vanity Fair.

In 2003 Nilsson returned to Paris, joining Nina Ricci as their Creative Director of fashion, and perfume and cosmetics. He revitalized Nina Ricci to tap into a clientele of "uptown girls" and "the new generation of socialites“ who included Anne Hathaway, Renée Zellweger, Reese Witherspoon, Kate Beckinsale and Dita Von Teese In 2004 he designed the brand's first ever resort collection and was able to raise attention for the brand through several international runway shows, trunkshows and soirées. He also worked on innovative collaborations, such as with the famous corsetier Mr Pearl.

In 2006 Nilsson was presented with the highest Swedish Fashion Award, the Guldknappen (Swedish for Golden Button).

Nilsson was appointed Creative Director of Gianfranco Ferré following the founder's sudden death on September 25, 2007. However, he left after less than six months.

Starting 2007 he began working on establishing his own furniture and textiles collection.

In September 2009 Nilsson started his menswear label Mr. Nils. He showed his first collection as a special guest of Pitti Uomo in Florence, Italy In 2011, his branding efforts were recognised when he was awarded the Graphis Gold Award for Best Advertisement Campaign.

In January 2014 the Japanese retail giant, Fast Retailing Co. Ltd tapped Lars Nilsson as artistic director of its two European brands, Comptoir des Cotonniers and Princesse Tam Tam, both based in Paris.

Until 2017 Nilsson was also a contributor to several magazines which included Acne Paper and Architectural Digest.

=== Interiors ===
In 2018 it was announced that Lars Nilsson would be collaborating with the iconic Swedish store, Svenskt Tenn, producing a range of luxury interior fabrics and home accessories.

The Capri Collection was inspired by Nilsson's time spent on the Island of Capri, staying at the Villa San Michele, home of Axel Munte and later famed Italian aristocrat Luisa Marchesa Casati.

The Collection consists of woven and printed interior textiles. Through this collaboration Nilsson also worked on a series of rugs with Swedish company Vandra Rugs which were made available exclusively at Svenskt Tenn.

Nilsson's collaboration with Vandra Rugs has since continued and he has produced numerous designs which have also been presented in Stockholm, Paris, London and Milan.

Nilsson has also collaborated with luxury Swedish bed company Hästens. The ongoing collaboration has so far consisted of a range of bed linens.

The Iris Collection got its name from the flower and was inspired by Nilsson's travels in England, notably the gardens of Sissinghurst and Great Dixter in Kent and East Sussex respectively, but also the Jardin des plantes in Paris.

Launch presentations for the Iris Collection took place February 2019 in Stockholm and May 2019 in New York.
