= 2007 in red carpet fashion =

Red carpet fashion in 2007 featured beading and metallic themes at the Golden Globe Awards, dresses with a single shoulder strap at the Oscars, and strong colours or black-and-white at the Emmy Awards.

== Golden Globe Awards (January 15) ==
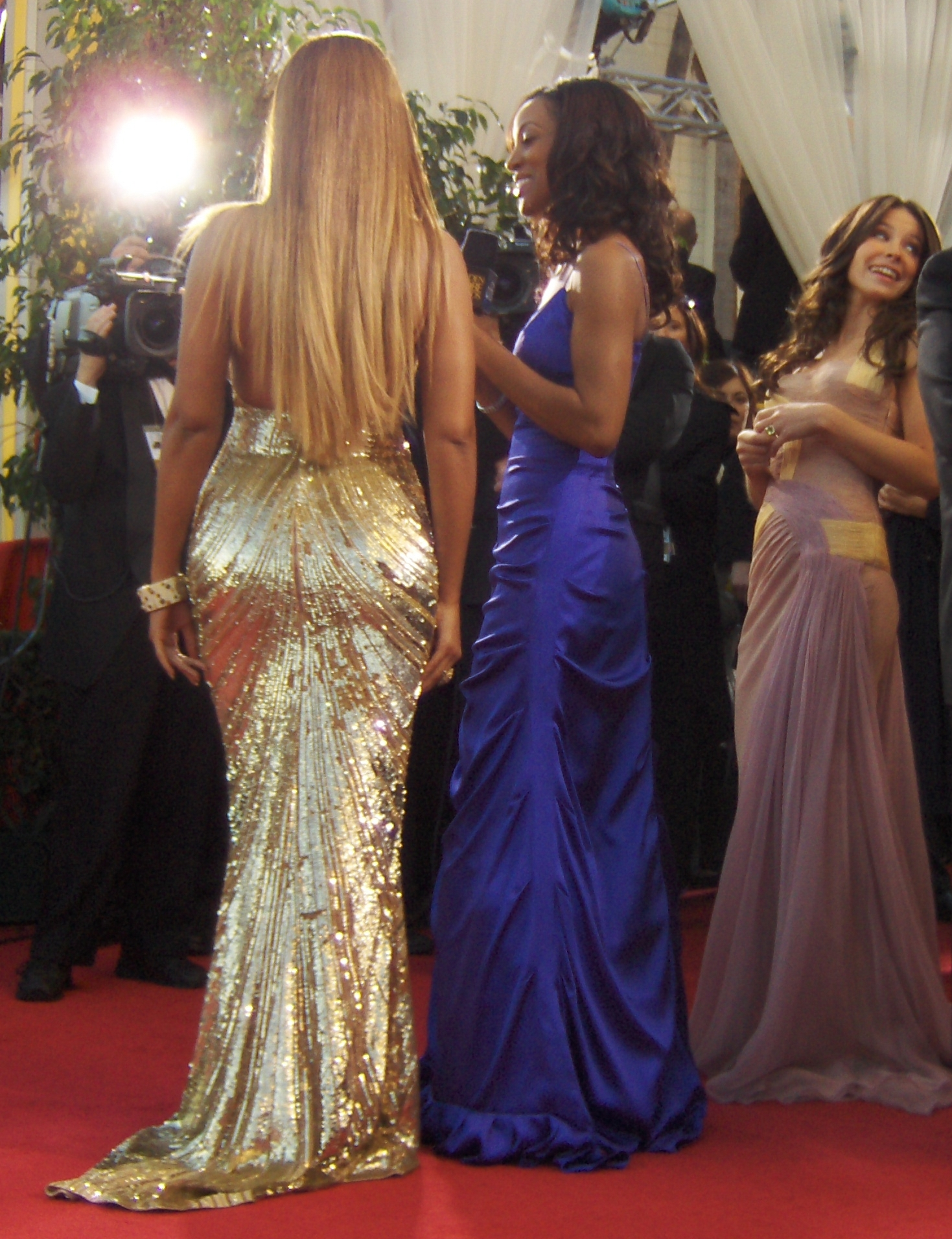
Beyoncé and Evangeline Lilly at the 64th Golden Globe Awards on January 15, 2007

Many of the female attendees at the 64th Golden Globe Awards chose beaded or metallic dresses, such as Beyoncé's solidly sequinned gold Elie Saab gown, with jewellery used sparingly, such as a single large diamond ring or a pair of hoop earrings. White gowns were another trend of the night. The New York Times noted that many stars had chosen big hairstyles, but praised those who wore their hair down.

One of the most-publicised dresses was Reese Witherspoon's atypical (for her) short dress by Olivier Theyskens for Nina Ricci for her first public appearance after her divorce from Ryan Phillippe. The tight, strapless lemon-yellow dress was named 12th best dress of the decade by InStyle and polled 11th in a 2008 Debenhams poll naming the top 20 red carpet dresses up to that year. The dress was remembered years later as a "bold and empowering choice" that gave the newly single Witherspoon "oomph" and made her seem "sexier than ever". InStyle fashion director Hal Rubenstein, who called the dress "a brilliant strategy" for the event, christened it the "Ryan Who?" dress in his 2012 book 100 Unforgettable Dresses.

== Academy Awards (February 25) ==
Oscar fashion at the 2007 ceremony was generally described as tasteful albeit unadventurous, and dominated by "mint green, chic neutrals and shades of blue". Penélope Cruz's rose-beige strapless Versace dress with its voluminously feathered skirt was a highlight, with one reporter proclaiming it "the definition of an Oscar dress: gorgeous color, perfect fit, epic style". It continued to be remembered well after the event, with the fashion journalist, magazine editor and stylist Alexandra Fullerton calling it a "seminal moment in Oscar style" to the BBC. In addition to this, Cruz's dress was rated 15th in the Debenhams poll, named 5th best dress of the decade by InStyle, and Cosmopolitan praised it in their list of best Oscar Dresses as a bold choice that fitted Cruz perfectly. Cosmopolitan also admired Helen Mirren's nude-coloured beaded and lace Christian Lacroix dress, calling it "freaking foxy", and Cate Blanchett's one-shouldered silver and Swarovski crystal mesh dress by Giorgio Armani. Maggie Gyllenhaal, Beyoncé and Kate Winslet also wore one-shouldered dresses. Against the other dresses' neutral and subtle colours, Blanchett's choice of sparkling silver was particularly outstanding, with Cosmopolitan saying, "Cate makes the list (of Best Oscar Dresses) twice because of her consistently impeccable style. This one-shouldered gunmetal gown clings to her fabulous body like it was painted on, and the delicate and elegant hair and makeup complete the look without distracting us from the dress."

Alternative looks worn by the men included a brown tuxedo for Djimon Hounsou and outsize lapels for Clive Owen, whilst Peter O'Toole wore purple brocade and Spike Lee chose white, with a spotted ascot tie and blue beret.

== Emmys (September 16) ==
Gowns worn to the 2007 Emmys followed the contemporary trend for bright colours, mainly in satin, with black-and-white as an alternative. Many guests wore strapless dresses, and trends for upswept hairstyles, bold lipstick, dangling earrings, and large rings were also noted. Although attendees received the customary fashion coverage, very few were singled out for extensive commentary on their wardrobe choices, and InStyle did not choose any dresses from this event for their Top 100 dresses of the decade.

== Other events ==
For the Golden Age of Couture VIP gala at the Victoria and Albert Museum, Kate Moss wore a vintage 1930s wedding dress in gold satin that was rated 10th in the Debenhams poll. The fabric of the dress was very fragile, and it is largely remembered for tearing apart through the course of the evening, exposing Moss's body beneath and leaving her in rags by the time she left for the after-party. Although the dress was often attributed at the time to Christian Dior, subsequent reports do not link Dior to the dress which, in its destroyed state, was later donated to a fundraiser in aid of Cancer Research UK.
