= Frans Molenaar =

Dutch fashion designer

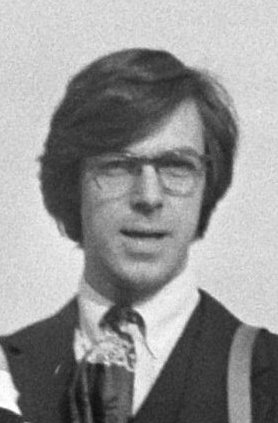
- Molenaar in 1969
- Born: 11 May 1940; Amsterdam, Netherlands
- Died: 9 January 2015 (aged 74); Amsterdam, Netherlands
- Resting place: Zorgvlied, Amsterdam
- Occupation: Fashion designer
- Label: Frans Molenaar Couture

Frans Molenaar (Dutch pronunciation: [frɑns ˈmoːlənaːr]; 11 May 1940 – 9 January 2015) was a Dutch fashion designer.

He studied to become a tailor in Amsterdam from 1955 to 1958. After his studies he did an internship with Charles Montaigne in Paris from 1959 to 1960 and worked for Gérard Pipart at Nina Ricci also in Paris from 1961 to 1964.

In 1967 he started his own business "Frans Molenaar Couture" and he worked as an haute couture designer since.

He initiated the fashion award Frans Molenaar prijs in 1995.

Molenaar died 9 January 2015, aged 74, after suffering injuries from falling down a staircase at his home in December 2014.
