= Benzyl salicylate =

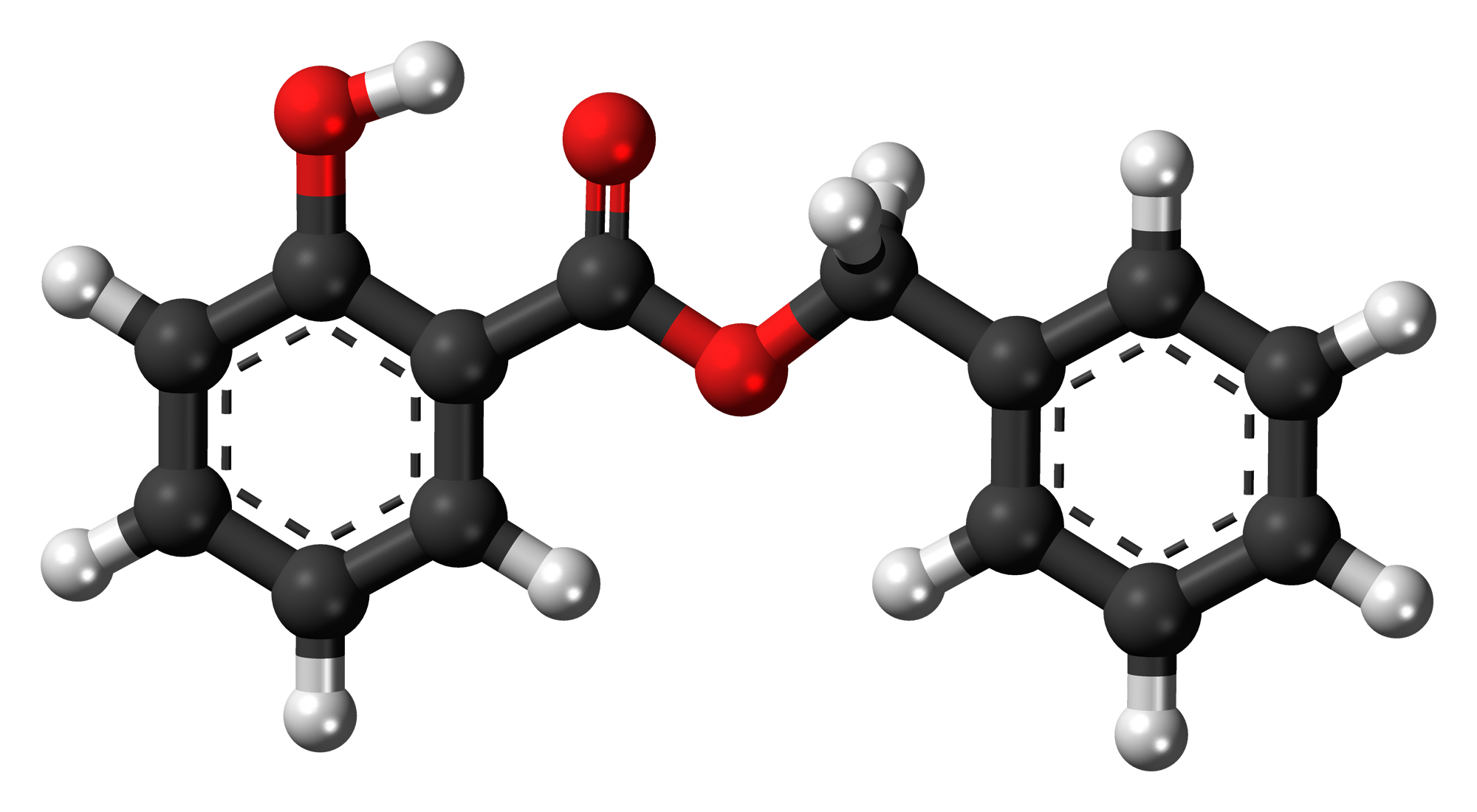

Names
- Preferred IUPAC name Benzyl 2-hydroxybenzoate

Identifiers
CAS Number	118-58-1
3D model (JSmol)	Interactive image
ChEMBL	ChEMBL460124
ChemSpider	8060
ECHA InfoCard	100.003.876
PubChem CID	8363
UNII	WAO5MNK9TU
CompTox Dashboard (EPA)	DTXSID1024598
- InChI: InChI=1S/C14H12O3/c15-13-9-5-4-8-12(13)14(16)17-10-11-6-2-1-3-7-11/h1-9,15H,10H2 Key: ZCTQGTTXIYCGGC-UHFFFAOYSA-N; InChI=1/C14H12O3/c15-13-9-5-4-8-12(13)14(16)17-10-11-6-2-1-3-7-11/h1-9,15H,10H2 Key: ZCTQGTTXIYCGGC-UHFFFAOYAC
- SMILES: O=C(OCc1ccccc1)c2ccccc2O

Properties
Chemical formula	C_{14}H_{12}O_{3}
Molar mass	228.247 g·mol^{−1}
Appearance	Colorless liquid
Density	1.17 g/cm^{3}
Melting point	24 to 25 °C (75 to 77 °F; 297 to 298 K)
Boiling point	318 °C (604 °F; 591 K)
- Except where otherwise noted, data are given for materials in their standard state (at 25 °C [77 °F], 100 kPa). verify (what is ?) Infobox references

Benzyl salicylate is an organic compound with the formula HOC_{6}H_{4}CO_{2}CH_{2}C_{6}H_{5}. it is the benzyl ester of salicylic acid. A colorless oil, it is used in cosmetics as a fragrance additive or UV light absorber.

== Odor ==
It has a mild odor described as "very faint, sweet-floral, slightly balsamic" by some, while others smell nothing at all. There is debate whether the odour is caused solely by impurities or a genetic predisposition. It occurs naturally in a variety of plants and plant extracts and is widely used in blends of fragrance materials. Nina Ricci L'Air du Temps (1948) was the first fragrance to use benzyl salicylate in large quantities; other perfumes that have it include Elizabeth Arden Blue Grass (1934), Prince Matchabelli Wind Song (1953), Estée Lauder Youth-Dew (1953), Norell Norell (1968), Estée Lauder Estée (1968), and Revlon Charlie (1973).

There is some evidence that people may become sensitized to this material and as a result, there is a restriction standard concerning the use of this material in fragrances by the International Fragrance Association.

It is used as a solvent for crystalline synthetic musks and as a component and fixative in floral perfumes such as carnation, jasmine, lilac, and wallflower.

== See also ==
- Oil of wintergreen
