= L'Air du Temps =

L'air du temps is a French expression that roughly translates to "the current trend" or "fashionable at the moment".

L'Air du Temps may refer to:

- L'Air du Temps (perfume) by Nina Ricci
- A song on the Florent Pagny albums Châtelet Les Halles and 2
- A song on the Vanessa Paradis album Bliss
- A non-competition section of the Cannes Film Festival in 1976 and 1977

== See also ==
- Zeitgeist
