= Crahay =

Crahay is a surname. Notable people with the surname include:

- Albert Crahay (1903–1991), Belgian soldier and historian
- Charles Crahay (born 1889), Belgian fencer
- Jules-François Crahay (1917–1988), Belgian fashion designer
