= Museum of Lifestyle & Fashion History =

American non-profit organization and museum

Coordinates: 26.5356°N 80.0957°W

The Museum of Lifestyle & Fashion History is a non-profit organization located in Palm Beach County, Florida. Currently the museum is seeking a permanent location.

Since year 2004, the Museum of Lifestyle & Fashion History has been conducting narrated bus tours of historic Delray Beach, Florida. In October 2011, the Museum of Lifestyle & Fashion History launched the first culinary tours in Palm Beach County.

== History ==
The Museum of Lifestyle & Fashion History was founded in 1999 to showcase "lifestyle, cultures, people, places, fashion trends, clothes, architecture, furnishings, decorative arts, interior designs, locomotives and toys, and information about popular uses of artifacts by people/events of various periods of time".

From 2003 to 2005 the museum was located in the Pineapple Grove Plaza in Delray Beach. In 2005, the plaza was sold and demolished. From 2009 to 2012 the museum relocated to the Boynton Beach Mall in Boynton Beach, Florida. There were two permanent history exhibits: the Fashion Treasures exhibit showcasing fashions from the 1800s to present, and the Barbie Museum gallery chronicling the anthropological impact of this world famous doll.

=== Barbie Museum ===
The Barbie Museum display at the Museum of Lifestyle & Fashion History included hundreds of vintage, original and collector edition Barbie dolls, her family members and friends, and clothes and accessories dating from the doll's beginning in 1959 to the present.

Efforts were started in 1999 to raise monies to establish the non-profit Museum of Lifestyle & Fashion History to feature a permanent gallery for the Barbie doll and the doll's popular culture history. Additionally, to complement the Barbie Museum, the Museum of Lifestyle & Fashion History featured a permanent rotating small-format exhibit about fashion history from the late 1880s to present.

In 1999 the idea developed for this unique museum devoted to Barbie doll history began when then 27-year-old Lori J. Durante conceived, organized and curated an exhibit entitled: "40 Years of the Barbie Doll: In Celebration of Women's History Month". Durante had worked as a fashion stylist for Boca Raton Magazine and Worth Avenue Magazine and also as a fashion writer for other publications. In 1998, Durante came up with a fashion news story idea about Barbie's 39th birthday for a news article she wrote for Jezebel Magazine. The research about the Barbie and the subsequent news story that Durante wrote inspired Durante to create an exhibit display about the doll for her 40th anniversary in 1999 to be located in Delray Beach, Florida.

For this exhibit display, Mattel loaned to Lori J. Durante multi-cultural and collector edition Barbie dolls that came from the Mattel archives in California. This small-format exhibit included a showcase of dolls from both Mattel and private collectors. The Barbie doll show became a blockbuster exhibit with more than 20,000 attendees from all over the State of Florida, the U.S. and from abroad. The exhibit became the number one exhibit in all of Palm Beach County, Florida and that attendance record for a locally created exhibit has not been broken yet.

== Permanent archival and artifact collections ==
The Museum of Lifestyle & Fashion History's permanent archival and artifact collection consists of more than 300 fashion items, clothes, accessories, household products, furnishings, decorative arts, toys and dolls, including ninety couture dresses designed by Arnold Scaasi that were given to the museum from a local historical society. The fashion collection includes clothing by Chester Weinberg, Bill Blass, Hattie Carnegie, Stetson, Lilly Pulitzer and Iris Apfel.
