= Michael Groveman =

American businessman (born 1962)

- Born: 1962 (age 63–64); Paramus, New Jersey, USA
- Education: Long Island University C.W. Post, 1984
- Label: Bill Blass Limited

Michael Groveman (born 1962) is an American businessman who was the CEO of Bill Blass limited from 1990 to 2007. Before moving to Bill Blass, Groveman was a manager in the accounting firm of Ferro, Berdon and Company in New York. He has a B.A. in accounting from Long Island University C.W. Post. Groveman sold Bill Blass to NexCen Brands Inc. in 2007 for $70 million.
