= Jules-François Crahay =

Belgian-born French fashion designer (1917–1988)

- Born: Jules-François Crahay; 21 May 1917; Liège, Belgium
- Died: 5 January 1988 (aged 70); Monte Carlo, Monaco
- Awards: Neiman Marcus Fashion Award, 1962

Jules-François Crahay (1917–1988) was a Belgian fashion designer who worked for the houses of Nina Ricci (1952–1963) and Lanvin as head designer (1963–1983). He won the Neiman Marcus Fashion Award in 1962, and was the only three-time winner of the French fashion award the Dé d'or or Golden Thimble (1977, 1981, 1984).

== Early life ==
Crahay was born in Liège. His mother, Françoise Crahay, was a Belgian dressmaker who gave her son his first experience as a sketcher for her when he was 13. Between 1934 and 1936, he studied art and fashion in Paris before rejoining his mother in the business.

During the Second World War Crahay served as a non-commissioned officer in the Belgian Army, being captured in 1940 and spending five years as a prisoner-of-war in Germany.

== Career ==
After the War, Crahay opened his own haute couture house in Paris in 1951, but it was unsuccessful. In Crahay's words, it was a "financial flop after one year," but he was subsequently employed by Robert Ricci as a designer for his mother's couture house. In 1959, he was made chief designer for Nina Ricci. While at Ricci, his bell-skirted suits and small-waisted dresses were described as having "charm," and described as the "youngest, most feminine thing in Paris."

Crahay moved to the more "select" Lanvin in 1964. Following his first collection, the journalist Eugenia Sheppard declared "Crahay's gay, wisecracking style and Lanvin's elegant workroom get together like bread and butter. Lanvin calms down Crahay and Crahay peps up the conservative old house." She also described how his colours stood out among that season's "terribly washed-out" palette, praised his use of abstract, "unromantic" prints, and noted his inventive coatdresses.

Crahay was known for combining a wide range of influences and sources of inspiration in his designs, rather than focusing on single sources. Two 1971 ensembles called Málaga (after the Spanish municipality) and Djerba (after the North African island) were made up in exclusive fabrics by the Scottish artist Eduardo Paolozzi. A 1977 collection combined references to Russia, Tibet and North Africa.

Crahay's last collection at Lanvin before he retired in 1984 won him his third Golden Thimble award for the season's best couture collection. The former model Jan Strimple commented: "Couture clothes generally don't fit into our way of life. But these were loose and layered and not at all pretentious. We all wanted to have them."

== Later life and death ==
Following his retirement Crahay divided his time between Saint-Raphaël and Monte Carlo, where he died of a heart attack in 1988.

== Retrospective ==
In February 2024 a nine-month exhibition of Crahay's work opened at the Fashion & Lace Museum, Brussels, under the title Jules François Crahay – Back in the Spotlight.
