= Michaele Vollbracht =

American fashion designer

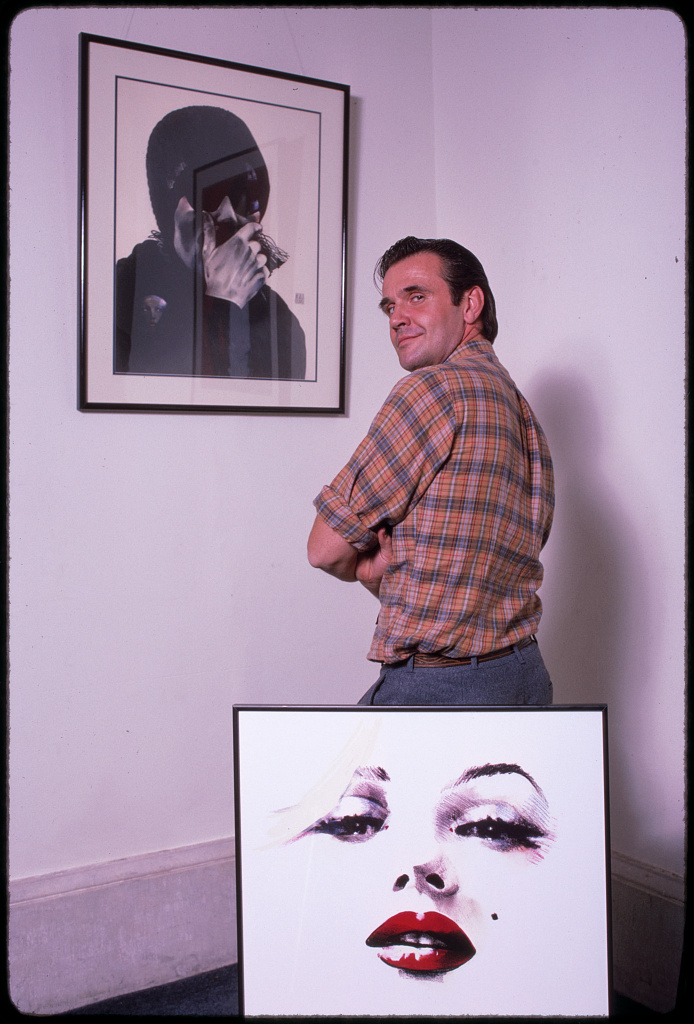
- Born: November 17, 1947; Kansas City, Missouri, U.S.
- Died: June 7, 2018 (aged 70); Safety Harbor, Florida, U.S.
- Education: Parsons The New School for Design, 1969
- Label: Michaele Vollbracht
- Awards: Coty Award, 1980

Michaele Vollbracht (November 17, 1947 – June 7, 2018) was an American fashion designer who worked under his own name and as head designer for Bill Blass Limited from 2003 until his resignation in 2007. He was well known as an illustrator, though he considered himself first and foremost a fashion designer.

== Early career ==
Vollbracht began his career in fashion as a student at what was then Parsons School of Design in 1965. Four years later, Geoffrey Beene hired him as a member of his design team, and Donald Brooks followed suit two years later. In 1973 he went to work for Henri Bendel as their in-house illustrator. He continued in that function when he moved to Bloomingdale's after another two years, but also designed the store's famous Face Bag, carried out daily by thousands of shoppers.

== Career ==
In 1979 he launched his own line, which was received so well that it earned him the Coty Award the very next year. The company folded in 1985 due to Vollbracht having accepted financial backing from Johnny Carson, which was withdrawn during Carson's bitter divorce from his third wife. Afterwards, Vollbracht published Nothing Sacred, a visual diary of his years in New York City and the many people he interacted with, and then moved to Florida to concentrate on his illustrations and art. In 1989, The New Yorker named him one of its top illustrators, and he would produce covers and other art for the next several years.

In 1999, Vollbracht returned to the world of fashion after Bill Blass, a longtime friend and mentor, asked him to design a retrospective on Blass's work for Indiana University's art museum. The retrospective, curated by Kathleen Rowold, opened in 2002 after Blass's death.

In 2003, Vollbracht returned to New York when he was invited to become head designer for Bill Blass Limited. He was the third designer to become head designer for the label. He resigned from the label a few years later in 2007.

In May 1981 he appeared as himself, a top fashion designer, in an episode about a fashion shoot in Hart to Hart.

== Death ==
Vollbracht died on June 7, 2018, at the age of 70.
