= Nina Hyde =

American fashion editor (1932–1990)

- Born: Nina Solomon; 1932; Manhattan, New York City, New York, U.S.
- Died: May 4, 1990 (aged 57–58); U.S.
- Occupations: Editor, writer

Nina Hyde (née Solomon; 1932 – May 4, 1990) was an American fashion editor. Following a stint for Women's Wear Daily, she moved to Washington, D.C. in 1961 and established the fashion page for The Washington Daily News, which became the "Hyde & Chic" column. She joined The Washington Post in 1972, where she remained until her death in 1990. For her contributions to fashion journalism, Hyde was honored with the Eugenia Sheppard Award and was named a Chevalier des Artes et Lettres.

After her death from breast cancer, the Nina Hyde Center for Breast Cancer Research at Georgetown University Hospital was established by Ralph Lauren and sixteen other designers. The fashion industry and The Washington Post continue to fundraise in memory of Hyde.

== Early life ==
Hyde was born Nina Solomon in 1932 in Manhattan, New York City. Her parents were Harry A. Solomon, an internist, and Ruth Solomon. She had one brother, Howard, and a sister, Marquise Sue. She was encouraged to be a doctor but she was upset by illness; a high school yearbook instead predicted that she would become the editor of Vogue. She graduated from Smith College and was accepted to the New York University School of Law, as one of only two women admitted to the class. She dropped out of law school to take a job with McCann-Erickson, an advertising firm, and Maidenform. She married real estate developer Lloyd Hyde in 1961. She had two daughters: Jennifer and Andrea.

== Career ==
Hyde joined Women's Wear Daily as a corset and brassiere editor, guided by the knowledge she had picked up in her role with Maidenform. She later worked for the Tobe Report. In 1961, she moved to Washington, D.C. with her husband and joined The Washington Daily News, where she was tasked with establishing the fashion page. She wrote the column "Hyde & Chic" for the paper, using her own funds to travel abroad to cover European fashion shows. When the newspaper closed in 1972, she joined The Washington Post. She was fashion editor at the newspaper until her death in 1990, when her position was filled by Cathy Horyn., She encouraged Jennifer Brice to enter a modelling contest sponsored by Hecht's department store and introduced her to Oscar de la Renta and Stephen Burrows. Hyde also worked as a freelancer for National Geographic.

Hyde was honored with the Eugenia Sheppard Award for fashion writing by the Council of Fashion Designers of America in 1989. The following year, she received the first lifetime achievement award granted by the Aldo Awards for coverage of the menswear industry, the Georgetown University Bicentennial Medal and named a Chevalier des Artes et Lettres by the French culture minister in Paris. She frequently gave lectures at Duke University, George Washington University, Georgetown University, Howard University and the Metropolitan Museum of Art. She was also a board member for Howard University Hospital and the D.C. Dance Company and founded what became the Duke Ellington School of the Arts. Fellow reporter Bernadine Morris said that Hyde "cover[ed] a fashion event as if it were a war."

== Death and legacy ==
Hyde was diagnosed with breast cancer in 1985, three years after a mammogram was misread that could have significantly improved her chances of recovery. The Washington Post, Ralph Lauren and sixteen other designers established the Nina Hyde Center for Breast Cancer Research at Georgetown University Hospital in 1989, including Lauren donating $100,000. Hyde died on May 4, 1990, at Georgetown University Hospital in Washington, D.C. at the age of 57. She raised almost $2 million for the Georgetown University Medical Center and after her death, the Post and her friends in the fashion industry continued to fundraise for the center, including launching a Super Sale fundraiser in 1990 and starting the Fashion Targets Breast Cancer campaign in 1994. In 1997, the musicians Judy Collins and Roberta Flack held a series of concerts to raise money for the center. Hyde's papers are held by the Fashion Institute of Technology.
