= Peter Som =

Chinese American fashion designer (born 1970)

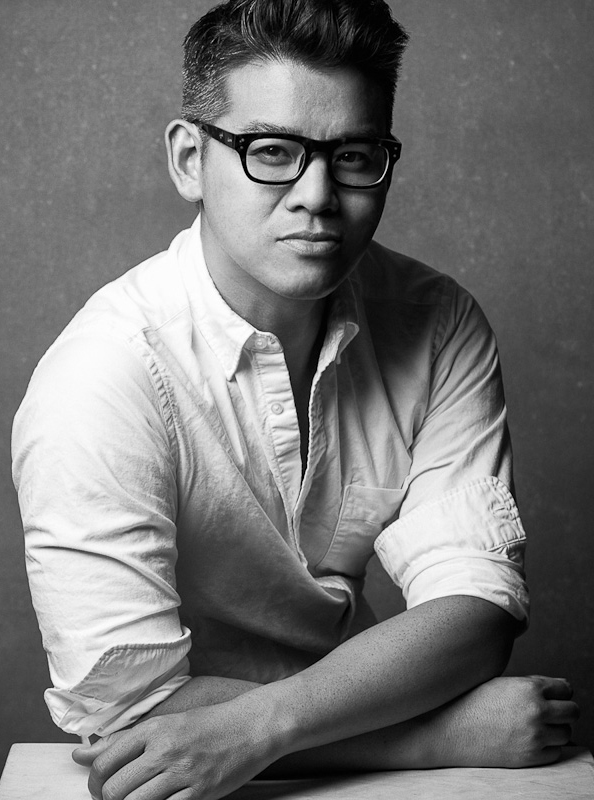
- Born: 1970 (age 54–55)
- Education: Connecticut College (BA); Parsons School of Design
- Occupation: Fashion designer
- Website: PeterSom.com

Peter Som (born 1970) is a Chinese American fashion designer. He was creative director for Bill Blass and creative consultant for Tommy Hilfiger, where he designed the women's wear collection, prior to founding his eponymous label. Born and raised in the San Francisco Bay Area, Peter Som graduated from Connecticut College in 1993 with a degree in art history. He continued his studies at the Parsons School of Design where he apprenticed with American designers, Michael Kors and Calvin Klein. At Parsons, his talent was recognized through competitions; he won and was presented with the Parsons Gold Thimble Award by Isaac Mizrahi.

After graduating, Peter Som pursued his career as a fashion designer by working under Bill Blass as assistant designer in 1998. In 2001, Som created his own line and unveiled the collection with a showing at Bryant Park. In 2007, he was appointed Creative Director of women's wear for Bill Blass. He then left the company in 2008 to concentrate on his namesake label. In 2009, Som became the creative consultant for Tommy Hilfiger, where he designed the women's runway collection through to 2012.

His label is Peter Som. His collections have been featured in fashion publications including Vogue, W, Elle, Harper's Bazaar, and InStyle. He has a clientele consisting of actresses such as Ginnifer Goodwin, Scarlett Johansson, Kate Mara, Allison Williams, Maggie Gyllenhaal, Natalie Portman, Liv Tyler, Amy Poehler, and Rashida Jones.

== Background ==
Som was born in 1970 and raised in San Francisco, California, by architect parents, who influenced him to start sketching at a young age. He now has a showroom located in New York City.

== Education ==
Peter Som graduated cum laude in art history from Connecticut College in 1993. He then studied fashion at Parsons School of Design and graduated holding apprenticeships with designers, Calvin Klein and Michael Kors. He won the Lord & Taylor dress competition and was then named the Rising Young Talent in the CFDA (Councils of Fashion Designers of America) Scholarship Competition. Isaac Mizrahi presented him with the Parsons Gold Thimble Award for his work in the school's Designer Critic program.

== Fashion career ==
After Peter Som graduated from Parsons with a degree in Fashion Design, he worked under Bill Blass as Assistant Designer in 1998. While working with Blass, Som worked on his own line out of his apartment and came to finish a 15-piece collection. In 2000, hoping for exposure for his protégé, Bill Blass asked Peter Som to accept the CFDA's Dean of American Fashion award in his place and later in 2001, Som became a CFDA member.

He made his debut at Bryant Park for his namesake collection in spring 2001. Sudanese model, Alek Wek wore a jaw-dropping white Peter Som dress to the CFDA Awards where Allure interviewed her about the dress which was then later mentioned in the magazine. In 2003, Cathy Horyn, resident fashion critic at the New York Times, identified Peter as "one of the best young designers working today."[2]

One of his most recognized collections was his spring 2007 collection. Vogue's Anna Wintour described the collection to be "career-changing". In response to Peter Som's Spring 2007 collection, Vogue's Andre Leon Talley wrote "it became emphatically clear that he has moved to the head of his generational class. Magna cum laude, in fact."

Som has made an impact among young celebrities including; Lucy Hale, Rachel McAdams, Amanda Peet, Claire Danes, Maggie Gyllenhaal, Eva Mendes, Krysten Ritter, Camilla Belle, and Mandy Moore.

In 2007 Som was appointed Creative Director for Bill Blass. He made his runway debut for Bill Blass in 2008 and later launched handbags for the label. He resigned from this role in October, 2008. Even while working as Creative Director for Blass and on his own collection, Som collaborated with Lancôme cosmetics. They teamed up for a limited edition lipstick based on his fall 2007 color palette. He later became part of the Creative Design Studio Group of Lancôme.

In 2009, Som became the Creative Consultant to Tommy Hilfiger Runway Collection. Over the years, he has collaborated with brands including Sferra Fine Linens, Surya Rugs and Anthropologie Ready-to-Wear. Som has secured shoe collaborations with shoe designers including Monolo Blahnik, Aperlai, Charlotte Olympia and Tabitha Simmons.

He was also approached by Anthropologie and launched a very successful ready-to-wear collection for the brand for the Spring 13 season under their Made in Kind initiative. In January 2014, the Les Copains Group announced Peter Som as the official designer for the contemporary Blue Collection beginning with the Spring/Summer 2015 Collection. He also was selected as the latest guest designer in Kohl's DesigNation series, which launched in April 2014 to great commercial success.

Peter's clothes are regularly featured in fashion publications globally, including Vogue, W, Elle, Harper's Bazaar and InStyle.

=== Anthropologie collaboration ===
On May 17, 2013, Peter Som's spring capsule collection for Anthropologie hit stores as part of their Made in Kind initiative. This initiative made designer clothing available to a wider range of consumers. The eleven-piece collection involved an array of clothing ranging from floral print maxi skirts to printed tops. The colors in this collection were inspired by Manhattan's Flower District which can be seen in many of the prints created for the line. Peter described his female inspirations as "social eccentrics, women of style that had a little something quirky or a little strange about them." He cited Edith Bouvier Beale ("Little Edie") and Diana Vreeland among them.

== Awards and nominations ==
In 1999, Peter Som was a finalist in Gen Art Styles. In 2001, he was nominated for Fashion Group International's Rising Star Award and again in 2003. He was also nominated for the CFDA Perry Ellis Award for Emerging Talent and won the Ecco Domani Fashion Award in 2002. In 2004, he was the finalist for CFDA/Vogue Fashion Fund Award and received a second Swarovski Perry Ellis Award Nomination from the CFDA. In 2006, he was one of the three finalists for the Cooper Hewitt National Design Award. In 2009, Marymount University presented him with its Designer of the Year Award.

== Clients ==
Som's clientele includes Michelle Obama, Anne Hathaway, Emma Watson, Zooey Deschanel, Alek Wek, Jourdan Dunn, Rachel Bilson, Mandy Moore and Amy Adams.[3]

== See also ==
- Chinese Americans in New York City
