= Walter Millis =

American historian (1899–1968)

Walter Millis (March 16, 1899 – March 17, 1968) was an editorial and staff writer for the New York Herald Tribune from 1924 to 1954. Millis was a staff member of the Fund for the Republic from 1954 to 1968. He later became the director of the Fund for the Republic's study of demilitarization in 1954.

Millis, widely recognized for his military histories, and as a leader of the "new military history," which integrated social and intellectual history themes into combat stories. He wrote eight books including: Road to War: America 1914–1917, This is Pearl! The United States and Japan—1941, Why Europe Fights, Viewed Without Alarm: Europe Today, Arms and Men: A Study of American Military History, The Martial Spirit: A Study of Our War with Spain, and An End to Arms. He also edited The Forrestal Diaries.

== Early life ==
Millis was born in Atlanta, GA, the son of John Millis, a regular army officer, and Mrs. Mary Raoul Millis. He graduated from Yale College, although his studies were interrupted by World War I, when he joined the Army and became a second lieutenant in the field artillery. He received his A.B. degree from Yale in 1920.

== Family ==
His first marriage, to the former Norah Thompson, ended in divorce. They had two children, Walter Millis Jr. and Sarah (Millis) McCoy. His second marriage, to fashion journalist Eugenia Sheppard in 1944, ended with his death. He was survived by six grandchildren.

== Works ==
His book Road to War had been tagged as "the isolationists' bible".

- The Martial Spirit - A Study of our War with Spain (1931)
- Millis, Walter (March 1957), "Arms and Men: A Study in American Military History", Political Science Quarterly, vol. 72, no. 1, New York: G. P. Putnam’s Sons
- Millis, Walter (1965). An End to Arms. New York: Atheneum.
