= Arnold Scaasi =

Canadian fashion designer

- Born: Arnold Isaacs; May 8, 1930; Montreal, Quebec, Canada
- Died: August 3, 2015 (aged 85); New York City, U.S.
- Occupation: Fashion designer
- Years active: 1950s–2015

Arnold Isaacs (May 8, 1930 – August 3, 2015), known as Arnold Scaasi, was a Canadian fashion designer who created gowns for First Ladies Mamie Eisenhower, Barbara Bush, Hillary Clinton, and Laura Bush, in addition to such notable personalities as Joan Crawford, Ivana Trump, Princess Yasmin Aga Khan, Lauren Bacall, Diahann Carroll, Elizabeth Taylor, Catherine Deneuve, Brooke Astor, Arlene Francis, Mitzi Gaynor, Barbra Streisand and Mary Tyler Moore.

== Biography ==
Scaasi was born Arnold Isaacs to a Jewish family in Montreal, Quebec, Canada, the son of a furrier. His decision to pursue a career in fashion was made at the age of fourteen during a trip to Australia to visit a stylish aunt. He returned to Montreal to study at the Cotnoir-Capponi School of Design and completed his education at the Chambre Syndicale de la Haute Couture Parisienne in Paris. He apprenticed at the House of Paquin before moving to New York City to work with designer Charles James.

=== Career ===
In the early 1950s, Scaasi's designs began appearing in a variety of print ads, including one for General Motors photographed by Edgar de Evia. During the shoot he met Robert Denning, who suggested he reverse his last name to give himself an Italian flair. Under his new name he achieved the December 1955 cover of Vogue, which led to his starting a ready-to-wear line the following year. He won the prestigious Coty Fashion Critics Award in 1958.

Bucking the trend for affordable fashions, Scaasi opened a couture salon catering to a clientele of socialites and celebrities in 1964. He was noted for his tailored suits and glamorous evening wear and cocktail dresses trimmed with feathers, fur, sequins, or fine embroidery. In 1969, he caught the eye of a worldwide audience when Barbra Streisand wore his sheer overblouse and pants ensemble to collect her Academy Award for Funny Girl at the 41st Academy Awards. The media attention made him a household name overnight. He later designed Streisand's contemporary wear for the 1970 film On a Clear Day You Can See Forever and costumes for Shirley MacLaine and Susan Sarandon in Loving Couples (1980) and Sally Field in Kiss Me Goodbye (1982).

Scaasi was presented with the Council of Fashion Designers of America Lifetime Achievement Award in 1996. Over the years, major retrospectives of his work have been presented at various venues, including Kent State University, Ohio State University, the Fashion Institute of Technology and the New-York Historical Society. The inaugural gown he designed for Barbara Bush is on display in the Smithsonian Institution.

After being out of the limelight for several years, Scaasi appeared on Martha Stewart's syndicated daytime series in May 2007 to announce he was returning to the ready-to-wear market.

Scaasi is the author of Scaasi: A Cut Above, published by Rizzoli in 1996, and Women I Have Dressed (and Undressed!), published by Scribner in 2004. He and his partner Parker Ladd were together for more than fifty years.

Scaasi died of cardiac arrest at a New York city hospital on August 3, 2015, at the age of 85.

== Museum retrospectives ==
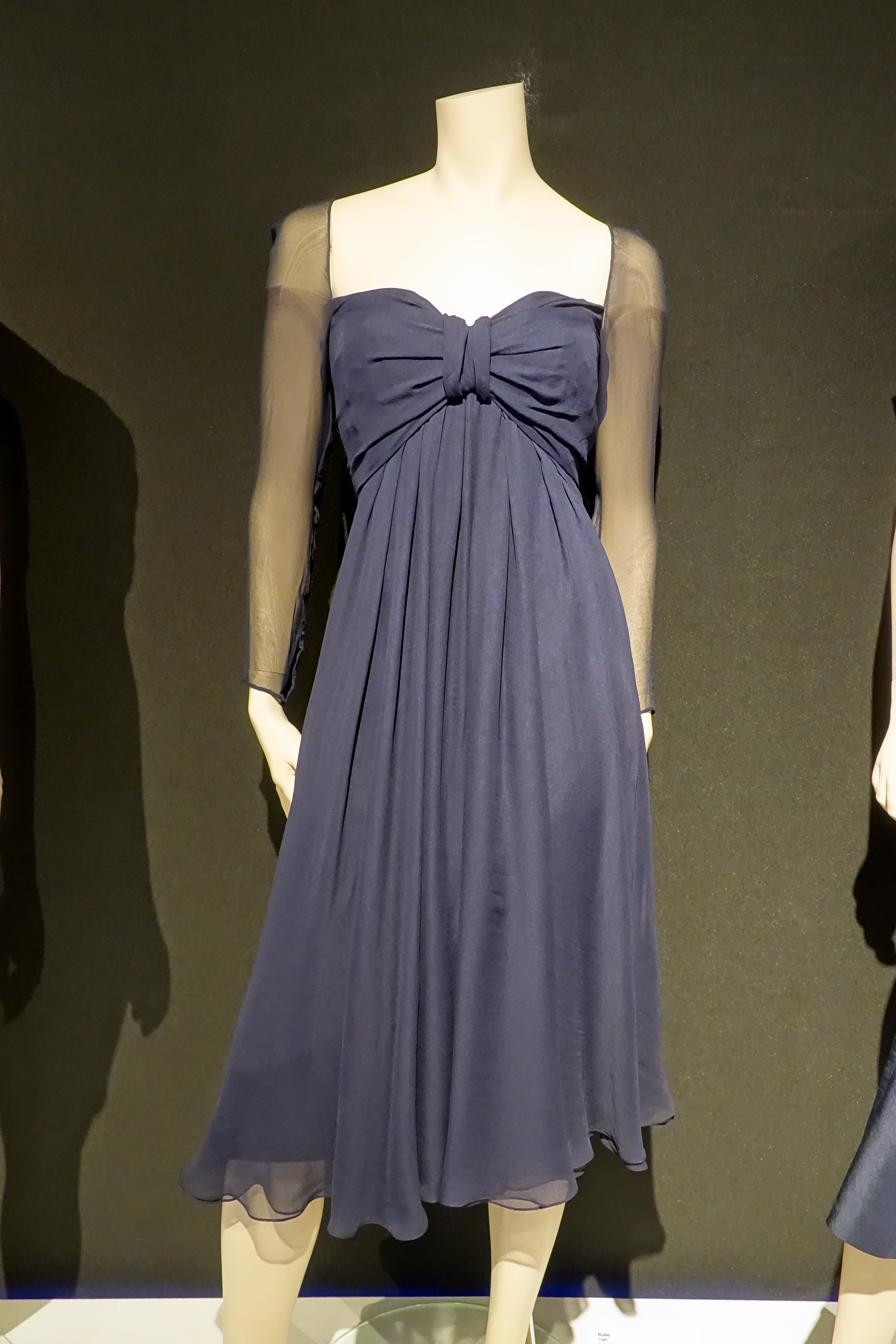
Dress by Arnold Scaasi

In 2001, The Kent State University Museum mounted a major Arnold Scaasi retrospective curated by Anne Bissonnette to celebrate the museum's fifteenth anniversary. In 2009 the Museum of Fine Arts, Boston acquired more than 100 couture designs by Scaasi and his paper and video archives, including sketchbooks from his collections from 1958 to the early 1990s, and all of his press clippings. A major exhibition of some of those clothes was shown in 2010 at the Boston Museum of Fine Arts in an exhibit called Scaasi: American Couturier, accompanied by a fully illustrated catalogue. The MFA's Scaasi collection includes the famous sequined pants outfit which was worn by Barbra Streisand in 1969 when she won the Oscar for the movie Funny Girl, along with stage costumes worn in her early concerts, a fur ensemble worn on her famous trip to Canada in 1970, and costumes worn in On a Clear Day You Can See Forever. The collection also contains designs worn by Aretha Franklin, Mary Tyler Moore, Diahann Carroll, Arlene Francis, Joan Sutherland, Joan Rivers, [Bette Midler], Louise Nevelson and numerous other socialites from New York and Palm Beach. Other museums with holdings of Arnold Scaasi designs in their collection are the Historical Society of Palm Beach County in West Palm Beach, Florida; the Grand Rapids Public Museum, in Grand Rapids, Michigan and at the Museum of Lifestyle & Fashion History in Boynton Beach, Florida and the Fashion Institute of Technology in New York City.

== Selected bibliography ==
- A. Parmal, Pamela,"ARNOLD SCAASI: AMERICAN COUTURIER", MFA Publications,2010. ISBN 978-0-87846-758-7
