= Hattie Carnegie =

American fashion designer

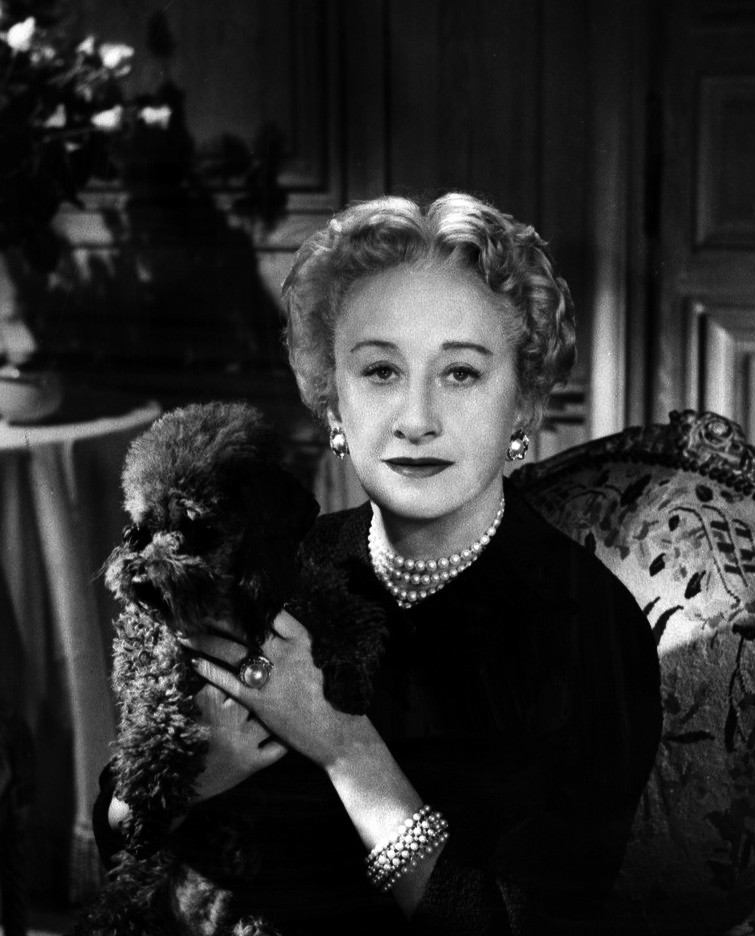
Carnegie in 1955

Hattie Carnegie (March 15, 1886 – February 22, 1956) was a fashion entrepreneur based in New York City from the 1920s to the 1950s. She was born in Vienna, Austria-Hungary, as Henrietta Kanengeiser. By her early 20s, she had taken the surname Carnegie as an homage to Andrew Carnegie, the richest person in the United States at the time.

== Early life ==
Born to a poor Jewish family, she was the second of seven children born to Hannah (née Kranczer) and Isaac Kanengeiser. When she was a young girl, her family immigrated to the United States, settling on the Lower East Side of Manhattan. She attended public school until her father died in 1902.

== Career ==
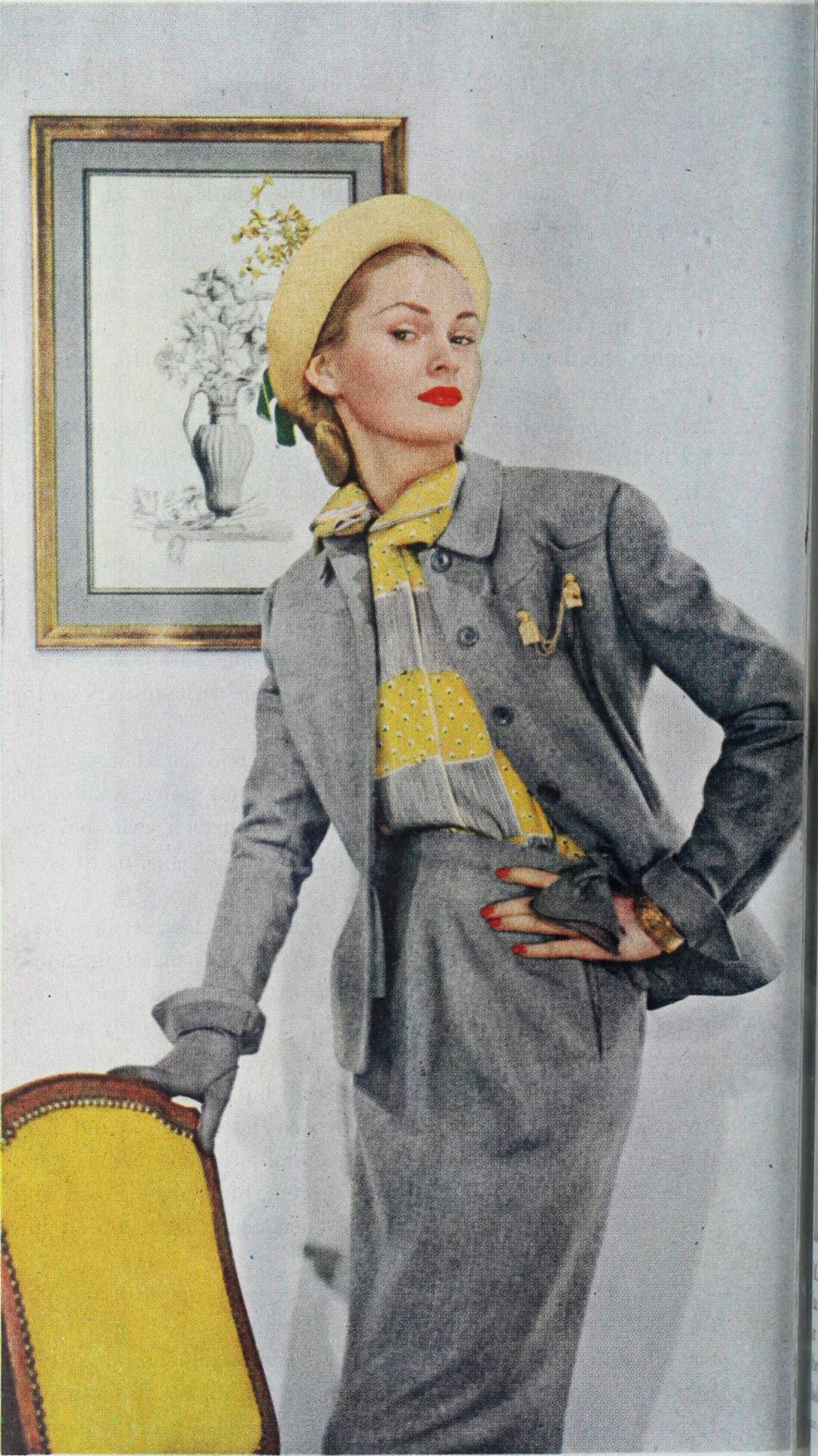
Suit, hat and blouse by Hattie Carnegie, shown in Ladies Home Journal, 1948

In order to help support her family, Carnegie took a job as a messenger at Macy's at age 13. At age 15, she modeled and trimmed hats at a millinery manufacturer.

In 1909, she launched a hat-making business with Rose Roth. Roth was a dressmaker and Carnegie designed hats. By 1919, Roth had left the business and Carnegie was the sole proprietor of Hattie Carnegie, Inc. At this point, Carnegie had a working capital of $100,000. She began travelling to Paris to buy original dresses to both sell in her shop and use as inspiration for her own designs. In 1925, Carnegie was successful enough to buy a building just off Park Avenue at 42 East 49th Street. By 1929, the business had sales of $3.5 million a year. When spending decreased during the Great Depression, Carnegie created a less expensive line called Spectator Sports.

In 1928, a then-unknown Lucille Ball began working for Carnegie as an in-house model. Carnegie ordered Ball to bleach her then-brown hair blonde, and Ball complied. Of this time in her life, Ball said, "Hattie taught me how to slouch properly in a $1,000 hand-sewn sequin dress and how to wear a $40,000 sable coat as casually as rabbit." Later, Ball moved back to New York City in 1932 to resume her pursuit of a career as an actress and supported herself by again working for Carnegie and as the Chesterfield cigarette girl.

Carnegie could not sew or cut a pattern herself, but she had an eye for talent. Her company discovered some of the most prominent American fashion designers of the twentieth century, such as Norman Norell, Pauline Trigère, Jean Louis, James Galanos, and Clare McCardell. For nearly a decade, the made-to-order department was headed by Pauline Fairfax Potter.

Carnegie also designed costumes for Hollywood pictures, including the 1933 precode comedy Our Betters, starring Constance Bennett and Gilbert Roland.

In response to the austerity measures of World War II, Carnegie designed a dress for home sewers that was published in the April 12, 1943, issue of Life magazine. Made to order by Carnegie, the dress was said to cost $175, but Life readers could make their own for as little as $5.

Carnegie's specialty was "the little Carnegie suit". In 1950, she was invited to apply her design sense to the Women's Army Corps (WAC) uniform. This was adopted for wear on New Year's Day 1951. On June 1, 1952, Carnegie received the Congressional Medal of Freedom for the WAC uniform design and for her many other charitable and patriotic contributions. The WAC design was so timelessly elegant that it was still in use for women's U.S. Army uniforms in 1968.

By the time of her death in 1956, Carnegie had established an $8 million business. Her husband and an employee attempted to sustain the business but it struggled without her creative leadership. The couture line ceased in 1965. The company continued to produce accessories and jewelry but closed for good in 1976.

== Personal life ==
Carnegie was married three times, including to:

- Ferdinand Fleischman, a prominent New York City florist, as his second wife. He was a son of Joseph Fleischman, a florist, hotelier, and owner of the Fleischman Baths. Carnegie and Fleischman married c. 1922–1923; by this marriage, she had a stepson, Frederick Fleischman (born 1915). Fleischman subsequently married, in September 1924, as his third wife, Sallie White, the former wife of Abraham White and one of Carnegie's friends and clients.
- Major John Zanft (1883–1960), the vice president and general manager of William Fox Theaters. They married in Philadelphia, Pennsylvania, on 22 August 1928.

== Legacy ==
Hattie Carnegie designs are in the permanent collection of the Metropolitan Museum of Art in New York, the Texas Fashion Collection, and at the Museum of Lifestyle & Fashion History in Boynton Beach, Florida. An exhibit of the dresses shown at the boutique of Hattie Carnegie was mounted at the Fashion Institute of Technology in 1996. The exhibit, Hattie Carnegie: American Style Defined, was curated by Professor Rose Simon.

Her work is included in the collection of the Museum of Fine Arts Houston.
