= Maxime Simoëns =

French fashion designer (born 1984)

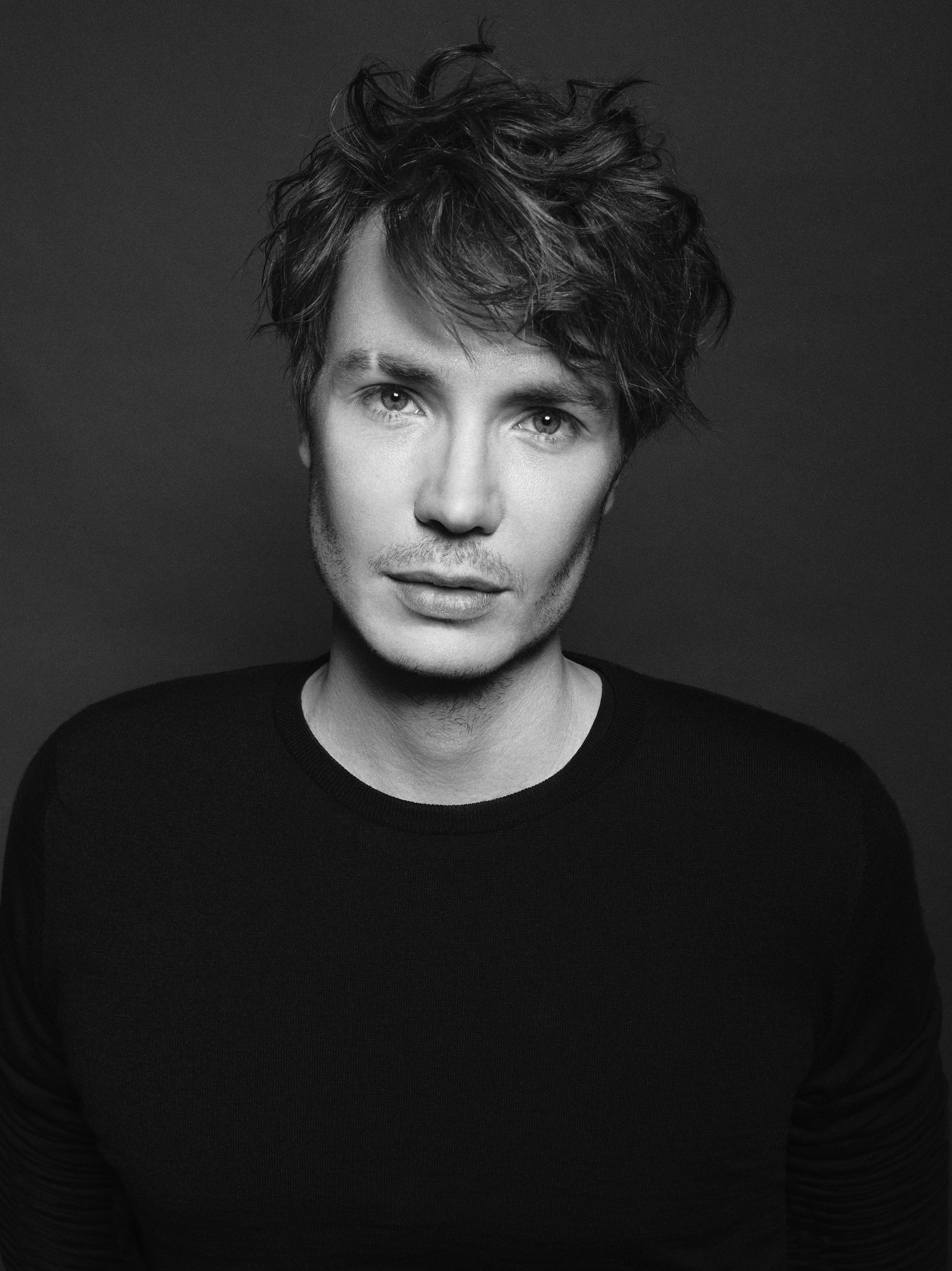
- Born: 15 November 1984 (age 41); Lesquin
- Education: Chambre Syndicale de la Couture Parisienne
- Label: Maxime Simoëns
- Website: www.maximesimoens.com

Maxime Simoens (born November 15, 1984, in Nord-Pas-de-Calais, France) is a French designer who has been the artistic director of Paule Ka since 2019. He is an "invited member" of the Chamber of Parisian Couture union.

== Early life and education ==
Simoens was born in Lesquin, near Lille, in 1984. At first inclined to pursue filmmaking, he later deemed it too technical. At a Madonna concert in June 2001, the Drowned World Tour, he decided to make fashion his profession. The sketches of Jean Paul Gaultier, displayed in the program, were the trigger for his decision on his future profession.

His degree in hand, Maxime went to study applied arts at the School of Conde de Lyon, then joined the Paris Union Chamber of Couture. He came first in several fashion contests. Forever marked by the power of the costumes by Jean Paul Gaultier, he decided to force open the doors of this house in order to win his first contest in the realm of accessories. In 2006, he graduated top of his class and still learning from the creators of such large homes Elie Saab, John Galliano for Dior and Nicolas Ghesquiere for Balenciaga.

== Career ==
=== Maxime Simoens, 2009–2015 ===
In 2009, Simoens created his own brand in 2009. He strives to create his world free of influence and create its logo, a barcode, a nod to the consumer society. In February 2009 he was selected to Hyères Fashion Festival in April and thus presented the first 10 pieces of his first collection, an innovative vision, combining graphic design at the architectural level of the garment. His silhouettes combine structure and fluidity, and he's often compared in the press to a young Yves Saint Laurent.

In 2013, LVMH took a minority stake in Simoens’ own brand for an undisclosed sum. That same year, the brand unveiled its first ready-to-wear collection, together with its first bag and shoes collection. His women's label closed in 2015.

=== Léonard, 2011–2012 ===
From 2011 to 2012, Simoens briefly served as creative director of French fashion house Léonard. In the Grand Palais in Paris he presented his first collection for Leonard on 5 March 2012.

=== Men's Ready-to-Wear ===
In 2016, he announced the creation of M.X PARIS, a men's ready-to-wear brand.

=== Azzaro, 2017–2020 ===
From 2017 until 2020, Simoens was the artistic director of Azzaro, with responsibility for the brand's couture collections, ready-to-wear lines, and accessories for women and men; he was succeeded by Olivier Theyskens.

== Collections ==
Deriving inspiration in art, music and movies from all eras and styles, Simoens creates narrative collections each season telling a new story full of icons and strong visuals. The identity of his style is marked by the structure refining the silhouette, cuts, contrasts, embroidery, incorporating printed and put into abyss of optical illusions, organza leaves miles to be desired.

== Events ==
On several occasions, Simoens dressed Melanie Laurent and Astrid Berges-Frisbey. On the fourth season of Gossip Girl, he dressed the two main heroines, Blake Lively and Leighton Meester.

In 2011, Simoens dressed singer Beyoncé for the cover of her album 4, the deluxe version, with one of his creations for Spring-Summer 2011–12.
