= Norman Norell =

American fashion designer (1900–1972)

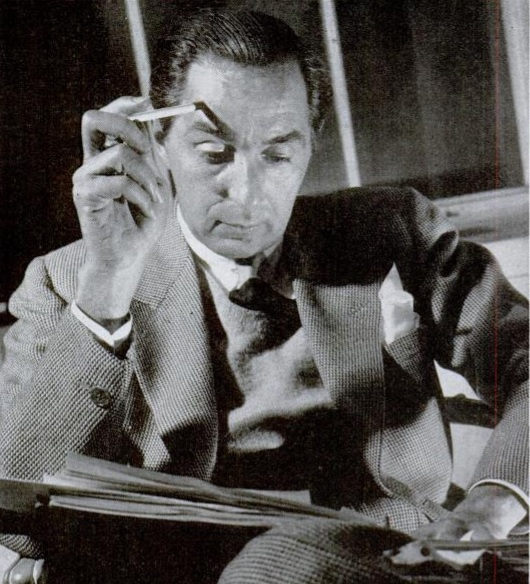
- Norell in 1944
- Born: Norman David Levinson; April 20, 1900; Noblesville, Indiana, US
- Died: October 25, 1972 (aged 72); New York City, US
- Resting place: Crownland Cemetery, Noblesville, Indiana
- Education: Parsons School of Design; Pratt Institute
- Occupation: Fashion designer
- Years active: 1922–1972
- Board member of: Parsons School of Design
- Awards: Coty Award (1943, 1951; Hall of Fame Award, 1956)

Norman David Levinson (April 20, 1900 – October 25, 1972) known professionally as Norman Norell, was an American fashion designer famed for his elegant gowns, suits, and tailored silhouettes. His designs for the Traina-Norell and Norell fashion houses became famous for their detailing, simple, timeless designs, and tailored construction. By the mid-twentieth century Norell dominated the American fashion industry and in 1968 he launched a perfume in collaboration with Revlon.

Born in Noblesville, Indiana, Norell arrived in New York City in 1919, studied fashion illustration and fashion design at Parsons School of Design and Pratt Institute, and began his career designing costumes for silent-film stars. Before partnering with Anthony Traina to form the Traina-Norell fashion house in 1941, Norell spent twelve years with Hattie Carnegie as a designer for her custom-order house. In the 1960s Norell became the sole owner of his own fashion house on Seventh Avenue in Manhattan. Norell amassed numerous private clients, including Hollywood stars and entertainers, wealthy socialites, and the wives of politicians and industrialists. On occasion, Norell created fashion designs for Hollywood films. Norell considered his greatest contribution to fashion was the inclusion of simple, no-neckline dresses.

Norell was the first recipient of the American Fashion Critics' Award, later known as the Coty Award, the first designer inducted into the fashion industry critics' Hall of Fame, and a recipient of an International Fashion Award from the United Kingdom's Sunday Times. He is also among the first American fashion designers to be honored with a bronze plaque along New York City's Seventh Avenue. Norell was a founder of the Council of Fashion Designers of America and a member of the Parsons School of Design's board of trustees, as well as a critic and teacher in the fashion design department at Parsons and a mentor to younger designers. The Pratt Institute awarded Norell an honorary fine arts degree. Norell continued to design fashions until his death in New York City in 1972.

== Early life and education ==
Norman David Levinson was born on April 20, 1900, in Noblesville, Indiana. He was the second son of Nettie and Harry Levinson. Norman's only sibling was an older brother named Frank. The family resided in the east side of a double home at 840 Cherry Street in Noblesville. His father, a haberdasher, ran a men's clothing store in Noblesville, but Norman later credited his mother with introducing him to fashion. Around 1905 Norman's father opened a men's hat store on Pennsylvania Street in Indianapolis, Indiana, and the family moved to Indianapolis about a year later.

Norman attended Indianapolis's Benjamin Harrison School and Shortridge High School. Frail and frequently ill in his early childhood, Norman recuperated in bed, amusing himself by drawing. Although his brother worked in the family's store from a young age and later managed the family's retail business, Norman preferred drawing and attending the theater. Because Norman's father advertised his hat shop in theater playbills, the family received free passes to attend the shows. Norman saw three or four theater performances a week and entertained himself by sketching costumes and theater sets. Norman's brother returned to Indianapolis after his enlistment in the military during World War I, but Norman attended a military school in Kentucky. After a brief and miserable period at the school, Norman withdrew and returned to Indianapolis, but he had no interest in joining the family's clothing business.

In 1919, at the age of nineteen, Norman traveled to New York City to study fashion illustration at Parsons School of Design. A year later he enrolled at the Pratt Institute in Brooklyn to study fashion design. Around the same time, Norman adopted his professional surname of Norell. During the 1940s Norell told reporters he came up with the surname by using the first three letters of his first name, "NOR", followed by the letter "L" for Levinson and another "L" for appearance. Norman never legally changed his surname to Norell.

== Career ==
Norell's career in the fashion industry spanned five decades, beginning in 1922, when he worked as a costume designer for Paramount Pictures in Astoria, Queens, until his death in 1972, when he was the sole owner of his own fashion house on New York City's Seventh Avenue. Over the years Norell's clients included Hollywood film stars and entertainers, as well as socialites and the wives of politicians and industrialists. Called the "dean of American fashion designers," Norell was the first recipient of the first fashion industry critics’ Coty Award. From the early 1940s through the 1960s his designs helped make the New York's fashion houses with which he was associated rivals to Parisian firms.

=== Early years ===
Following completion of his coursework at Pratt, Norell began his fashion career as a costume designer in New York City. In 1922 Norell joined the Paramount Pictures studios based in Astoria, Queens, New York, where he designed clothes for Gloria Swanson, Rudolph Valentino, and other stars of silent-film stars. Norell designed costumes for Zaza (1923) starring Swanson and was one of three costume designers for A Sainted Devil (1924) starring Valentino. Norell lost his job when the film industry relocated to California. He remained in New York and found work as a costume designer for the Broadway theater. Norell made costumes for the Ziegfeld Follies, as well as for the Brooks Costume Company. Beginning in 1924 Norell spent three and a half years with Charles Armour, a wholesale dress manufacturer, learning how to make real clothes for women instead of crafting theatrical costumes.

In 1928 Hattie Carnegie, a major name in the U.S. fashion industry at the time, hired Norell as a designer for her custom-order house. After Norell joined the firm Carnegie introduced her first line of high-quality, high-priced, ready-to-wear fashions that he had designed. The Carnegie-Norell duo also created fashions for celebrities and film stars such as Joan Crawford and Constance Bennett. Norell remained with Carnegie for twelve years. They split in 1941after a disagreement about the gowns he had designed for Gertrude Lawrence, the star of the Broadway musical, Lady in the Dark.

=== Traina-Norell fashion house ===
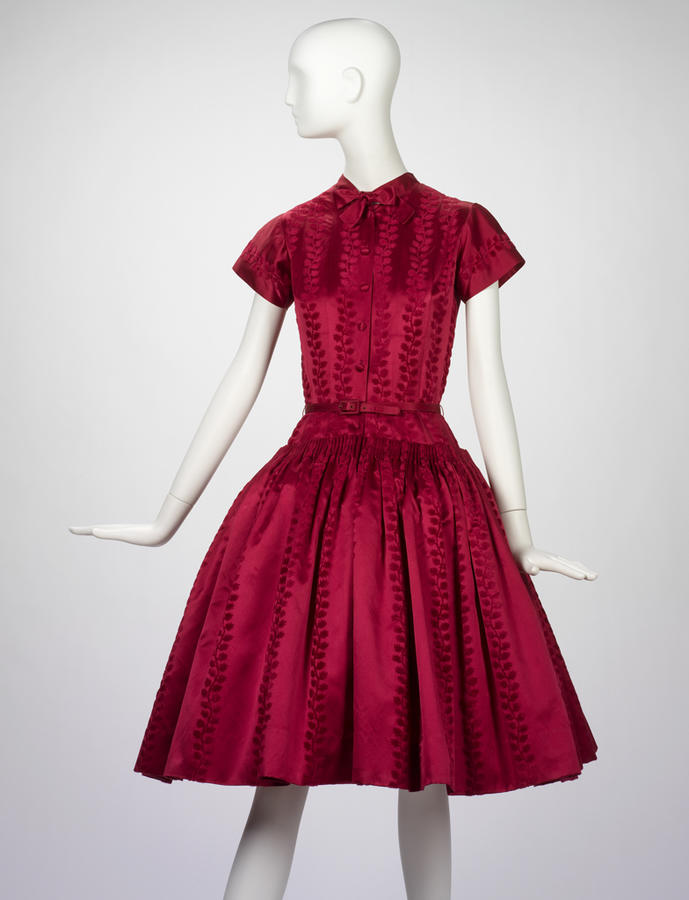
1949 Traina-Norell red silk dress with cartridge pleated skirt (RISD Museum)

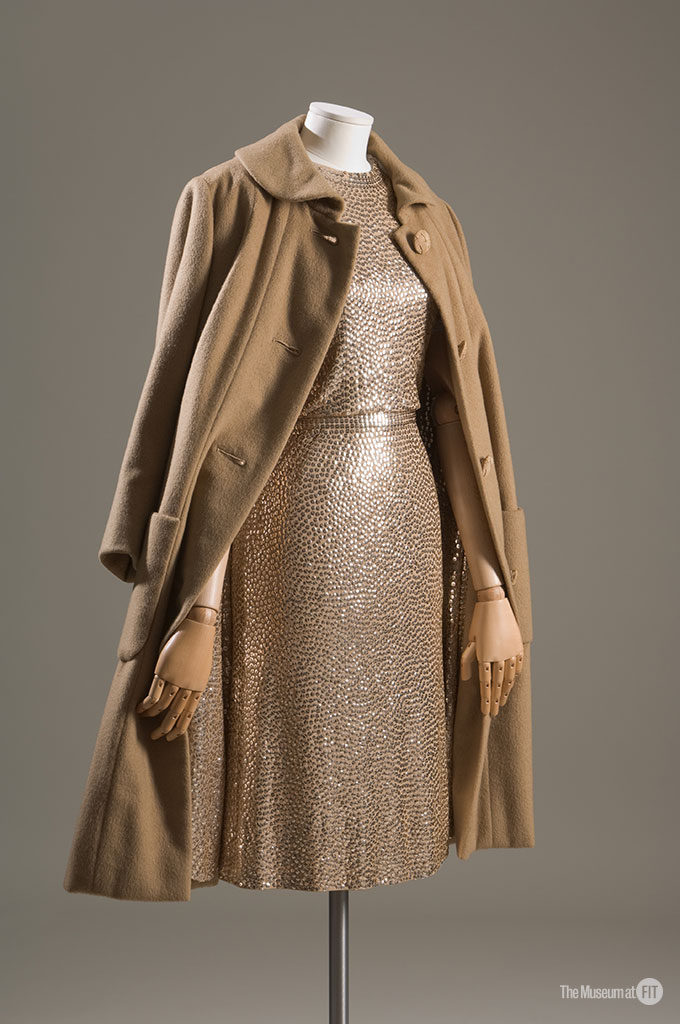
1958 Norell sequin sheath dress and coat worn by Lauren Bacall.(FIT)

When Norell left Carnegie's fashion house in 1941, he was not yet in the financial position to open his own fashion-design business, but he had earned a strong reputation for his designs within the industry. Anthony Traina, a wholesale clothing manufacturer, offered Norell a partnership. Traina would look after the business while Norell designed the fashions. Traina offered Norell a larger salary if Norell's name did not appear on the label, a smaller salary it did. Norell chose the lower salary/better visibility option. Traina-Norell launched its first collection in 1941.

Norell's fashions for the Traina-Norell label became famous for their detailing, simplicity, timeless design, and high-quality construction. According to The New York Times, the Traina-Norell collection became a "status symbol among American women." Norell's designs for a chemise, a sequin-covered sheath dress, and a fur-trimmed trench coat helped make the Traina-Norell label "a fashion byword," whose prestige equaled the Parisian labels.

During the World War II-era Norell became the leading New York fashion designer. He was the first among the New York designers to introduce a full collection of fashions, rather than an assortment of separate pieces. Norell's wool jersey dresses became staples of the Traina-Norell label, as did his sailor-suit-inspired dresses and spangle-covered "mermaid" gowns (a skin-tight, floor-length evening gown).

In 1943, Norell became the first recipient of the American Fashion Critics' Award, later known as the Coty Fashion Award. That same year he accepted a teaching position in the fashion design department at New York's Parsons School of Design. Norell maintained a close relationship with the school until his death in 1972. Over the years Norell became known for making impromptu visits to the school to assist Parsons students with their projects. For more than twenty years he served as a critic in Parsons' fashion department, where he was once been a student. Norell also mentored younger designers such as Bill Blass, another fashion designer from Indiana, and Stephen Sprouse. Norell contributed to the war effort as a volunteer on the weekends in New York's hospitals to help care for wounded soldiers.

Although Norell made annual trips to Paris after World War II to purchase fabric and traveled across the United States to show and sell his work, he remained a New York City resident for the rest of his life. Norell turned down an offer from Harry Cohn, head of Columbia Pictures, to move to Hollywood and create costume designs for the film studio. During the 1950s Norell's biannual shows of his collection at his firm's New York City showroom at 550 Seventh Avenue were lavish, black tie events. Norell received his second Coty Award in 1951 and became the first winner of the fashion industry critics' Hall of Fame award in 1956, the same year Norell designed Marilyn Monroe's wedding dress for her marriage to playwright Arthur Miller.

=== Norell fashion house ===
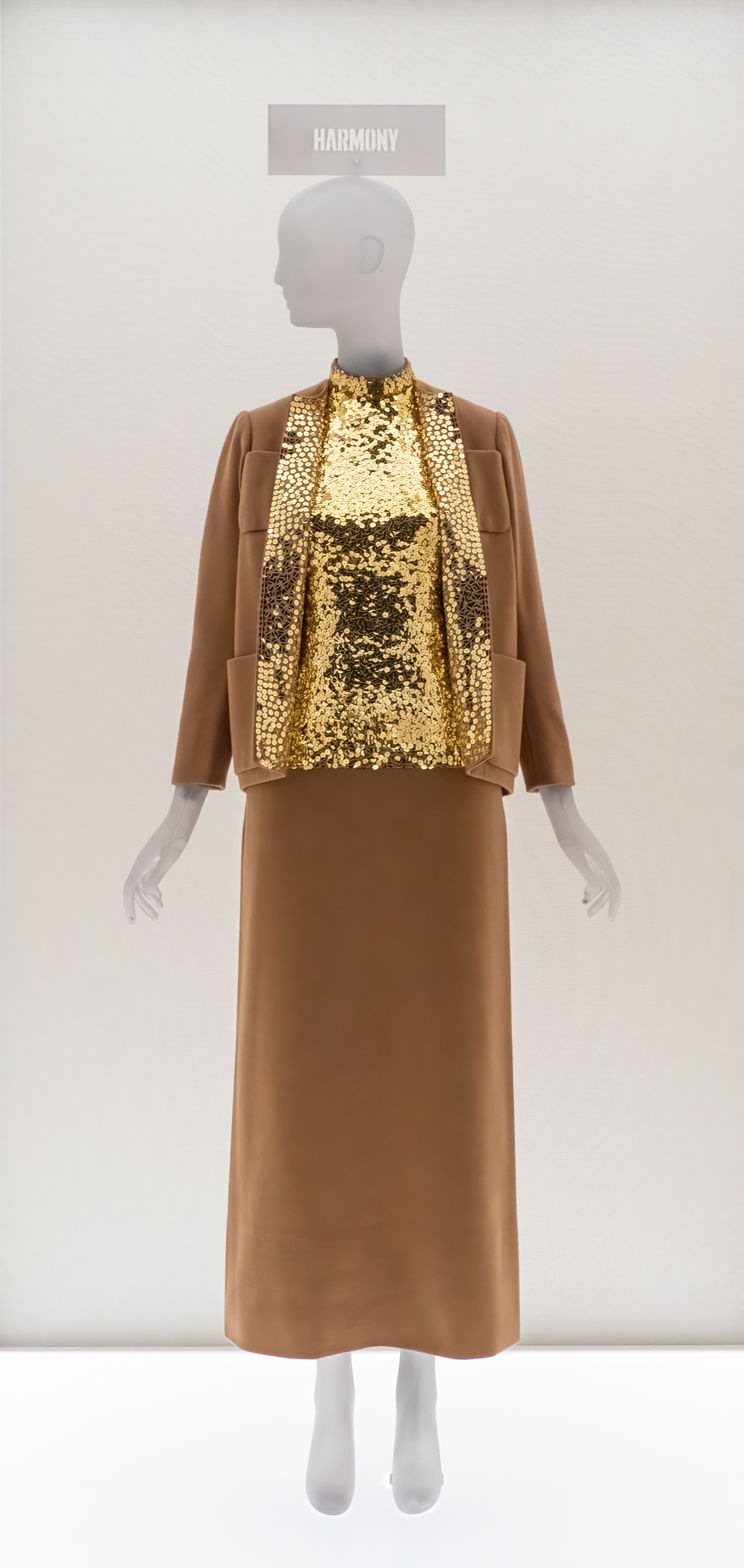
An ensemble designed by Norell in 1972–73 on display at the Metropolitan Museum of Art for the In America: A Lexicon of Fashion exhibition

After Traina retired in 1960 Norell and several silent partners established the Norell fashion house. Norell retained ownership of fifty-one percent of the company's stock. The firm's main office and showroom were on Seventh Avenue; its factory in lower Manhattan employed 150 workers. Norell held his first solo fashion show in June 1960. In the early 1960s Norell had become "the label of choice for the fashionable and the famous."

Norell amassed numerous private clients, including Hollywood stars such as Monroe, Lauren Bacall, Judy Garland, Carol Channing, Dinah Shore, and Lena Horne. Jacqueline Kennedy Onassis, Lady Bird Johnson, Babe Paley, and Lyn Revson, the wife of Revlon cosmetics founder Charles Revson, were also among his private clients. On occasion, Norell created designs for Hollywood films, including three ensembles for Doris Day that appeared in That Touch of Mink (1962) and fashions for the film Sex and the Single Girl (1964).

In 1968 Norell became the first American fashion designer to launch his own brand of perfume, marketed by Revlon. Norell took an active role in making selections for the composition of the new fragrance, which he described as "floral with green overtones." The perfume sold at $50 an ounce when it was successfully introduced in 1968, earning Norell an estimated $1 million. The venture provided him with sufficient funds to buy out his silent partners and become the sole owner of the Norell fashion house. Norell's dominance of the American fashion industry began to decline in the late 1960s as other designers, such as Blass and Halston, rose to prominence, but Norell was widely considered "the dean of the fashion industry" in the United States.

== Later years ==
Known throughout his career for his calm demeanor and easy-going manner, Norell lived a quiet, private life in New York City. He also maintained a lifelong relationship with his Indiana family, returning to Indiana for Christmas holidays and annual summer vacations for many years and keeping in touch via telephone.

Norell, a chain smoker, was diagnosed with throat cancer and underwent successful surgery on his vocal cords in 1962. His voice remained a hoarse whisper for the remainder of his life. Norell underwent a hernia operation in 1969. Newspapers also reported that he suffered from migraine headaches and diverticulitis.

Norell continued to design fashions until his death in October 1972. A retrospective show presented by the Parsons School of Design to honor Norell's fifty years in the fashion industry was scheduled to open at the Metropolitan Museum of Art on October 16, 1972. It went on as planned, although Norell had suffered a stroke the day before the opening and could not attend.

== Death and legacy ==
After Norell suffered a stroke on October 15, 1972, he was rushed to New York City's Lenox Hill Hospital. Norell never regained consciousness and died on October 25, 1972, at the age of seventy-two. His funeral service was held at the Unitarian Church of All Souls in Manhattan. Norell's remains are interred at Crownland Cemetery, Noblesville, Indiana, along with other members of the Levinson family.

The New York Times noted that Norell's designs were known for their "glamour, timelessness and high quality construction." Fashion critics also praised Norell for his keen eye for detail, accuracy in judging proper proportion, effective use of color, and insistence on high-quality workmanship. Norell's lavish, avant-garde fashion shows showcased his designs that were tailored for the American woman's active lifestyle. In 1972 the director of the Metropolitan Museum of Art remarked that Norell was an "inventive pacesetter," who was well known for his high quality, tailored fashions. He was especially known for his sailor-inspired clothes, chemise dresses, wool jersey dresses, and Empire-line dresses, as well as culottes and sequin-covered, "mermaid" evening gowns and sheath dresses. In the late 1960s, during the height of his popularity, Norell's "mermaid" gowns sold for $3,000 to $4,000, "considered the most expensive dresses in America" at that time. To make sure that imitations of his design for culottes would be constructed correctly, Norell published the specifications in Women's Wear Daily. Norell believed that his greatest contribution to fashion was the inclusion of simple, no-neckline dresses.

== Honors and tributes ==
In 1941 Norell became the first recipient of what became known as the Coty Award, the industry critics' top honor for fashion design. In 1956 Norell was the first designer inducted into the fashion industry critics' Hall of Fame and in 1962 the Pratt Institute awarded Norell an honorary fine arts degree. In 1963 the United Kingdom's Sunday Times awarded Norell an International Fashion Award. Norell was a founder of the Council of Fashion Designers of America and a member of the Parsons School of Design's board of trustees. In October 1972 Parsons honored Norell's fifty-year career in the fashion industry with a retrospective show at New York City's Metropolitan Museum of Art.

Beginning in 2000 the City of New York placed bronze plaques honoring American designers along Seventh Avenue and Norell was among the first to be honored. Michelle Obama, as First Lady of the United States, wore a vintage Norell dress at a Christmas party in December 2010.

In 2021, the Indiana Historical Bureau, Hamilton County Historical Society, Levinson Family, Rebar Develop, Nickel Plate Arts, and the City of Noblesville installed a historical marker in Noblesville, Indiana. It is located along 8th Street, between Cherry Street & Maple Avenue.
