= Loris Azzaro =

Tunisian born Italian fashion designer (1933–2003)

- Born: February 9, 1933; Tunis, French Tunisia
- Died: November 20, 2003 (aged 70); Saint-Cloud, France
- Occupations: Fashion designer, couturier
- Years active: 1965–2003
- Known for: Founder of the Azzaro fashion house; eveningwear and luxury fragrances
- Spouse: Michelle Azzaro (née Carsy)
- Children: 2

Loris Azzaro (9 February 1933 – 20 November 2003) was a French-Italian fashion designer. He rose to prominence in the 1960s with his flamboyant dresses and he went on to become well known for his perfumes.

== Early life and career ==
Loris Azzaro was born to Italian parents in Tunis, Tunisia on 9 February 1933. He spent his childhood and teenage years in Tunis. In 1957, Azzaro met his future wife Michelle Carsy, who became his muse and he designed accessories for her. Azzaro studied in Toulouse, France. He was teaching French and Italian in Tunis before he relocated to Paris, France in 1962.

== The Azzaro fashion house ==
=== Clothing ===
In 1965, Azzaro opened his first workshop, designing bags, belts, and embroidered tops. In 1967, Azzaro opened his boutique at 65 Rue du Faubourg Saint-Honoré. He presented his first couture collection at the Grand Hôtel de París. In 1968, Azzaro's Anneau dress worn by Marisa Berenson was featured on the cover of Elle magazine. Soon, actresses Brigitte Bardot, Jane Birkin, Sophia Loren, and Raquel Welch were wearing his designs. Tina Turner wore Loris Azzaro dresses often as stage costumes in the late 1960s and early 1970s. She appeared on the cover of publications such as Rolling Stone and Ebony wearing his dresses. Despite his popularity, Azzaro never designed haute couture clothing and was not a member of the Chambre Syndicale de la Haute Couture.

He added menswear to his fashion repertoire in 1992.

In 2002, Compagnie Frey bought the Azzaro fashion house to expand its luxury division.

=== Fragrances ===
In the 1970s, Azzaro launched fragrance brands for men and women. This included his first fragrance, Azzaro Couture (1975), and most notably Azzaro pour Homme (1978), which was created by perfumers Gerard Anthony, Martin Heiddenreich, and Richard Wirtz.

Azzaro partnered with the French fragrance licensee company Groupe Parfac (a subsidiary of Maurer & Wirtz) to scale up international distribution. In 1995, Clarins bought Groupe Parfac. In 2019, it was acquired by L'Oreal.

=== After Azzaro's death ===
Since 2006, Azzaro has been owned by Reig Capital Group.

Since the house’s founder died in 2003, Azzaro has been led by a series of designers, including Vanessa Seward (2003–2011), Mathilde Castello Branco (2011–2012), the duo of Arnaud Maillard and Alvaro Castejón (2013–2017), Maxime Simoëns (2017–2019) and Olivier Theyskens (since 2020). The brand was relaunched in 2017, when the house celebrated its 50th anniversary. From 2019, Azzaro staged coed couture shows.

=== Other activities ===
At Baselworld in 2007, Azzaro launched its first jewelry line, done under license with Gay Frères.

== Death ==
Azzaro died from cancer at the age of 70 on 20 November 2003. He was survived by his wife Michelle Azzaro, two children, Beatrice Azzaro and Catherine Azzaro, and three grandchildren. His daughter Beatrice Azzaro ran his company, Couture Loris Azzaro.
