= Eugenia Sheppard =

American writer (1899–1984)

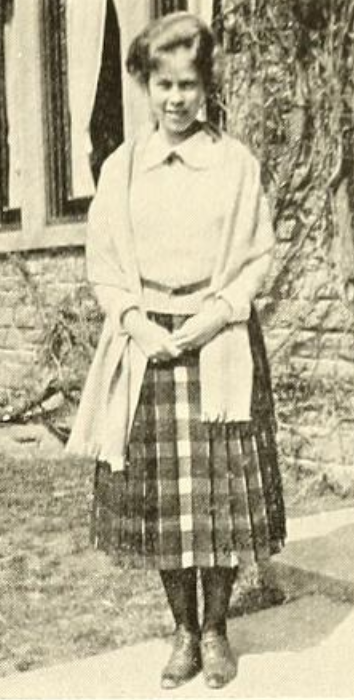
- Sheppard, from the 1921 yearbook of Bryn Mawr College
- Born: Eugenia Benbow Sheppard; July 24, 1899; Nelsonville, Ohio, US
- Died: November 11, 1984 (aged 85); New York City, US
- Other name: Eugenia Sheppard Black
- Occupations: Fashion journalist, newspaper columnist
- Spouse: Walter Millis

Eugenia Benbow Sheppard (July 24, 1899 – November 11, 1984) was an American fashion writer and newspaper columnist for some 80 newspapers (including the Columbus Dispatch, New York Post, The Boston Post, and most notably, the New York Herald Tribune.

== Early life and education ==
Eugenia Benbow Sheppard was born in Nelsonville, Ohio, the daughter of James Taylor Sheppard and Jane (Benbow) Sheppard. She graduated from Bryn Mawr College in 1921.

== Career ==
She was credited with having "revolutionized fashion reporting with her reports in the New York Herald Tribune (1940–56)". Her syndicated column, Inside Fashion, made her the most influential fashion arbiter of the 1950s and 1960s. Her fashion columns at the New York Herald Tribune carried Joe Eula's illustrations.

Sheppard wrote a children's play, Cinderella (1928). She also collaborated with Earl Blackwell on writing two novels, Crystal Clear (1978) and Skyrocket (1980), both set in the fashion world.

== Personal life and legacy ==
Sheppard married three times. Her first two marriages, to Samuel Black and Preston Wolfe, ended in divorce. She married her third husband, fellow journalist Walter Millis, in 1944; he died in 1968. She died from cancer in 1984, aged 85 years, in New York City. She was survived by her son Sheppard Black, stepson Walter Millis Jr., and stepdaughter Sarah Millis McCoy. Andy Warhol succinctly memorialized her in his diary entry of Monday, November 12, 1984, writing, "Oh and the day had started out with Eugenia Sheppard dying of cancer. She invented fashion and gossip together."

The Eugenia Sheppard Award for journalism has been given annually since 1987 by the Council of Fashion Designers of America. Winners include Robin Givhan, Cathy Horyn, Nina Hyde, and André Leon Talley.
