= Bill Blass Group =

American fashion label

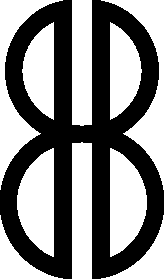
- Founded: 1970
- Headquarters: New York, NY
- Key people: Bill Blass - Founder
- Website: Bill Blass website

Bill Blass Group replaces what was formerly Bill Blass Limited, a fashion house founded by American designer Bill Blass.

== Bill Blass Limited ==
Designer Bill Blass began designing for Anna Miller in 1959, and his name began appearing on the label starting in 1960 after it merged with Maurice Rentner. He renamed the company Bill Blass Limited. After purchasing it in 1970, after making a name for himself with Rentner. This made him the first American designer to print his own name on his designs. He also created the Blassport medium-priced fashion line in 1972. Bill Blass Limited rose to prominence over the 1970s, being worn by individuals such as Jacqueline Kennedy to Gloria Vanderbilt.

The line expanded to include swimwear, furs, luggage, perfume, and chocolate, and Miles Socha wrote of the company in 1998 that the company had allowed “42 licenses in a wide variety of products, from furniture and lamps to handbags and fragrances, generating about $800 million in annual retail sales.” By this time, Blass considered retirement, and his last line as head of the company came with the Spring 2000 collection at New York City Fashion Week in September 1999. He sold the company for $50 million in 2000. From 2003 to 2007, Bill Blass Limited's head designer was Michaele Vollbracht. He resigned as head designer in early 2007, at about the same time as the company was acquired by Nexcen Brands in February 2007 through a $54.6 million cash and stock acquisition of the company. According to Ellin Saltzman in The New York Times, "He took American sportswear to its highest level … giving it a clean, modern, impeccable style… He, probably more than any designer knew his customer and understood her." Keystones of the brand identity include exuberant use of color, embellishment and the embodiment of the casual American spirit.

== Bill Blass Group ==
Following the acquisition, Peter Som began designing Bill Blass womenswear and Michael Bastian would design the menswear line. In December 2008, Bill Blass filed for Chapter 7 bankruptcy liquidation, with Peacock International Holdings, LLC, purchasing Bill Blass Limited, now known as Bill Blass Group, LLC. Following the acquisition of the brand, Peacock stated that it had plans to revive the Bill Blass couture line, which had been discontinued a few months prior to the purchase. The new head of the label would be Jeffrey Monteiro, who worked as head designer until 2012. Between the death of Blass and this point, six different designers had been hired and dismissed; the 2012 collections were cancelled upon Monteiro's firing.

In November 2014, Chris Benz was appointed as Creative Director, as a part of a new rebranding effort. Benz stated that "I have forever admired and have deep respect for [Blass] as an original American designer." An article republished from The New York Times on October 6, 2020, stated that Benz had left the company.
