= Cathy Horyn =

American fashion journalist

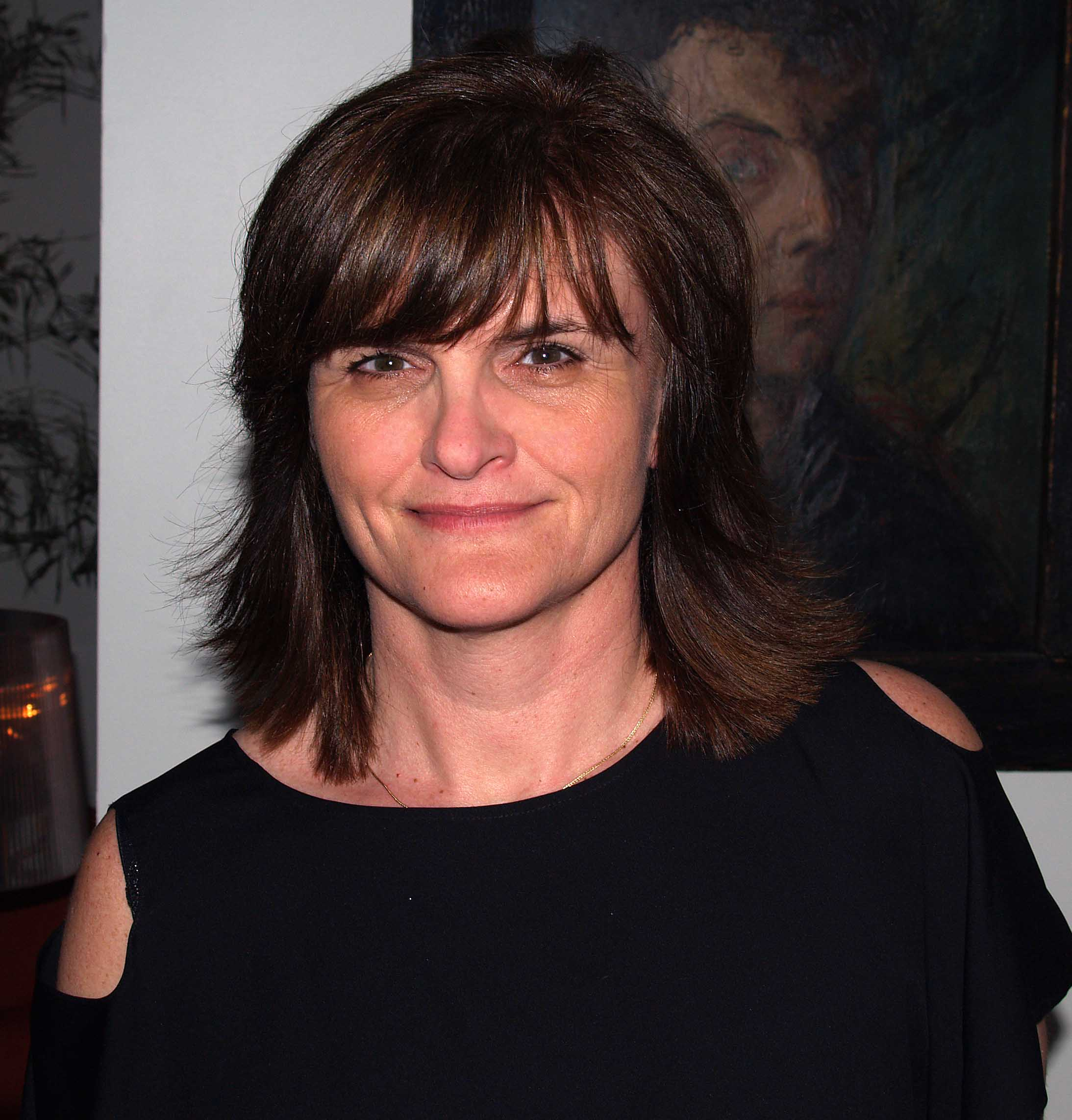
- Horyn (2007)
- Born: September 11, 1956; Coshocton, Ohio, U.S.
- Occupations: journalist, fashion critic
- Notable credit(s): The New York Times, The Washington Post, Vanity Fair

Cathy Horyn (born September 11, 1956) is an American fashion critic and journalist who worked for The New York Times from 1998 until 2014 where she had the highly noted and provocative blog On The Runway. In 2015, she was appointed critic-at-large for New York Magazine's website The Cut, reviewing the Fall 2015 womenswear shows in New York and Paris. Horyn was only the second New York Times fashion critic, having succeeded Amy Spindler who retired in November 2003. She is a supporter of Belgian designer Raf Simons.

== Background ==
Raised in Coshocton, Ohio, she started her career in 1986 working in journalism at The Detroit News. Horyn then moved to Washington, D.C. in 1990 and worked on fashion at The Washington Post. She moved to The New York Times in 1998. Magazines and newspapers to which she contributes include Vanity Fair, Vogue, Harper's Bazaar, and International Herald Tribune. She is known for her sharp, unflinchingly acerbic reviews, which resulted in her being banned from numerous designer shows, most notably Giorgio Armani and, as of 2012, Hedi Slimane's Yves Saint Laurent show in Paris.

== Career ==
In June 2002, she received the 2001 Eugenia Sheppard Award by the Council of Fashion Designers of America for questioning the work and exposing the deal-making of Vogue editor-in-chief Anna Wintour.

Horyn's first newspaper job was for The Virginian-Pilot in Norfolk, VA. Following this, from 1986 until 1990, Horyn worked for Detroit News as a fashion reporter. In 1990, she became a fashion reporter for The Washington Post, where she worked until 1995.

In January 2010, Horyn was criticized when she insinuated in an article that actress Christina Hendricks was large. The photo of Hendricks included in Horyn's article was distorted by being widened, possibly to falsely illustrate Horyn's point. The New York Times replaced the image, claiming that it had been only slightly distorted inadvertently due to an error during routine processing.

In September 2012, Horyn's review of Oscar de la Renta's spring/summer 2013 collection, in which she referred to him as a "hotdog of American fashion," garnered a great deal of negative press. De la Renta responded in an open letter, published in WWD, criticizing the lack of professionalism and the often personal nature of her infamous reviews, saying that if he was a "hotdog," then Horyn might be a "stale 3-day-old hamburger." Horyn later addressed the designer's retort through Fashionologie.com, defending her word choice of hotdog: "I used the term in a professional context, as someone showing off his tricks, like a surfer."

In a mock self-made newspaper column published on Twitter, designer Hedi Slimane criticized Horyn speculating her profession to be a publicist masquerading as a New York Times journalist. In Slimane's letter, he refers to Horyn's preference for designer Raf Simons and adds: "As far as I'm concerned, she will never get a seat at [a] Saint Laurent [show] but might get 2 for 1 at Dior. She should rejoice. I don't mind critics [sic], but they have to come from a fashion critic, not a publicist in disguise. I am quite mesmerised she did get away with it for so many years." Horyn had written a negative review of Slimane's collection for Saint Laurent, although she was not actually in attendance at the show. Horyn used photographs of the show to write her review.

In 2014, Horyn authored a biography of fashion illustrator Joe Eula. Horyn has also served as a contributor for fashion photographer Nick Knight’s SHOWStudio.

== Education ==
Horyn undertook her undergraduate studies at Barnard College and earned a master's degree in journalism from Northwestern University.

== Bibliography ==
=== As editor ===
- Bare Blass (with Bill Blass), New York: HarperCollins, 2002 (ISBN 0-06-018555-4; ISBN 978-0-06-018555-8)
