= Gérard Pipart =

French fashion designer

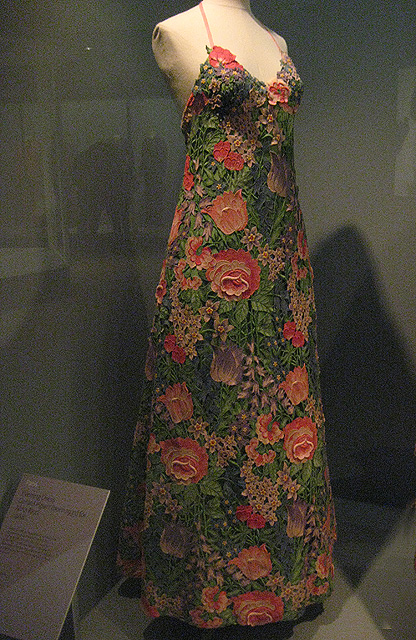
1968 Nina Ricci evening dress, designed by Pipart

Gérard Pipart (25 December 1933 – 28 June 2013) was a French fashion designer, and was the creative director at Nina Ricci for more than 30 years.

Pipart was born in Paris, France. He began his career aged 16 at Pierre Balmain, and worked for Givenchy, Jean Patou, and Chloé.

He became chief designer/creative director at Nina Ricci in 1964. He continued in this role until 1998, when Puig purchased the brand and dropped the couture line.

Pipart died on 28 June 2013.
