= Olivier Theyskens =

Belgian fashion designer (born 1977)

- Born: January 4, 1977 (age 48); Brussels, Belgium
- Labels: Nina Ricci; Rochas; Theory
- Awards: CFDA International Award

Olivier Theyskens (Dutch pronunciation: [oːliviˌjeː ˈtɛiskəns]; born January 4, 1977) is a Belgian fashion designer who has worked with major design houses, including Rochas, Nina Ricci and Theory.

== Early life ==
Theyskens was born to a Belgian chemical engineer and a French homemaker. Theyskens attended École Nationale Supérieure des Arts Visuels de la Cambre in October 1994 to study fashion design. He dropped out in 1997 to start his own label.

== Career ==
=== Early beginnings ===
Theyskens submitted pieces from his collection, “Gloomy Trips” to a Belgian group show. Stylist Arianne Phillips saw photographs of his works and dressed Madonna in one of Theyskens’ black satin coatdresses for the 1998 Academy Awards. André Leon Talley listed the dress as one of his favorite Oscar dresses of all time.

Theyskens presented his first full collection in Paris in 1998. The collection was a deconstruction of eighteenth-century style that reworked traditional French fabrics. His spring 1999 collection was featured on Vogue’s list of “25 Most Unforgettable Runway Shows of the ‘90s.” By fall 2000, Vogue reported that “Theyskens has established himself as one of the most powerful creative personalities in fashion.” That same year, he won the Venus de la Mode award. The collection he presented in Fall 2001 “was undoubtedly one of the strongest, most brilliant collections of the season” according to Vogue. Theyskens' line continued until 2002.

=== Rochas, 2002–2010 ===
Theyskens became creative director of Rochas in 2002 and presented his first collection for the House of Rochas in 2003 where he created an "entirely new silhouette for the house" that was French-influenced and elegant. In 2003, Theyskens designed costumes for Théâtre Royal de la Monnaie including costumes for Verdi's opera I due Foscari. Theyskens received the Star Award by the Fashion Group International at its 22nd Annual Night of Stars Gala in 2005.

In July 2006, Rochas' parent company Procter & Gamble announced the discontinuation of Rochas' fashion division because it was the only fashion business in the company and Procter & Gamble did not have the resources or skills to continue production of ready-to-wear fashion. In 2006, the Council of Fashion Designers of America awarded Theyskens the International Award.

=== Nina Ricci, 2006–2010 ===
In November 2006, Theyskens became artistic director at Nina Ricci where his focus shifted to a younger, more casual level of dressing. His collections for the House of Nina Ricci were met with critical acclaim.

In fall 2009, Theyskens left Nina Ricci and was replaced by Peter Copping, formerly design director of Louis Vuitton.

=== Theory, 2010–2014 ===
Theory CEO Andrew Rosen tapped Theyskens to design a capsule collection for Theory in spring 2010. Theyskens was named artistic director of the company in October 2010. In June 2014, he left Theory to pursue other design projects. His last collection for Theory was pre-spring 2015.

=== Olivier Theyskens, 2016–present ===
In 2016, Theyskens debuted his first collection under his own name for more than a decade. The brand was entirely self-funded.

=== Azzaro, 2020–present ===
In 2020, Theyskens was named artistic director of Azzaro, with responsibility for the brand’s couture collections, ready-to-wear lines, and accessories for women and men; he succeeded Maxime Simoëns.

== Recognition ==
In 2010, Assouline Publishing released a retrospective look at Theysken’s work, “The Other Side of the Picture,” which was the culmination of a 10-year collaboration with art photographer Julien Claessens.

Theyskens' creations have been worn by Nicole Kidman, Cate Blanchett, Reese Witherspoon, Emma Watson, Diane Kruger, Greta Gerwig, Felicity Jones, Jennifer Aniston, Mylene Farmer, Bella Hadid and Kirsten Dunst.
