= Joe Eula =

American fashion illustrator

- 1977 Andy Warhol polaroid of Eula
- Born: Joseph Eula; January 16, 1925; Norwalk, Connecticut, U.S.
- Died: October 27, 2004 (aged 79); Kingston, New York, U.S.
- Resting place: Old Hurley Burial Ground
- Education: Art Students League of New York
- Occupation: Fashion illustrator

Joseph Eula (January 16, 1925 – October 27, 2004) was an American fashion illustrator. He was a prominent illustrator in the 1960s and 70s, having held the post of creative director at Halston for ten years.

== Early life ==
Eula was born Joseph Eula in Norwalk, Connecticut, January 16, 1925, the second of four children. His father died when he was two; Eula's mother, Lena, ran a grocery store to provide for the family. Eula graduated from high school in 1942, at age 17, and was enlisted in the 10th Mountain Division to serve in the Italian Campaign. Subsequently, he fought in the Apennines and was awarded the Bronze Star. Upon his discharge in 1945, he enrolled at the Art Students League of New York. His first illustrations as a student there were published in Town & Country magazine—whose editor at the time was Baron Nicolas de Gunzburg—and Saks Fifth Avenue.

== Career ==
In the mid-1950s, Eula started working with Eugenia Sheppard, illustrating her syndicated column Inside Fashion in the New York Herald Tribune. He later went on to work with Ernestine Carter in the London Sunday Times, covering European fashion. This was common practice at the time, since the fashion salons were too small to accommodate photographers and writer–artist pairs had to be present to report on the trends and fashion shows.

Among his work for American Vogue and The New York Times, Eula also had a long-standing association with Italian Harper's Bazaar. In this occupation he notably covered Yves Saint Laurent's first (1958) and last (2002) collections, and was a house artist for several other designers, including Coco Chanel, Hubert de Givenchy, Gianni Versace, Christian Dior and Karl Lagerfeld. He maintained a friendly relationship with some of these distinguished figures of the fashion world, especially with Coco Chanel, whose collections he often drew. He is known to have attended an Yves Saint Laurent couture show on one occasion, only to shout out that it was terrible after a brief time and walk out; his friendship with Yves Saint Laurent and his partner, Pierre Bergé, remained unaffected.

He also had close personal and professional relationships with leading figures of other artistic fields, designing a suit for jazz musician Miles Davis, in addition to the stick-like figures on the cover of his 1960 album Sketches of Spain, concert posters for The Supremes (Lincoln Center, New York, 1965) and Liza Minnelli's Liza with a "Z" (1972). Being friends with photographer Milton Greene since the 1940s, he shared a flat with him in New York City and worked with him for Life magazine, upon his return from Europe.

Parting with Greene in 1968, Eula went into theatre where his work on a Broadway production of Private Lives earned him a Tony Award. He also designed sets and costumes for Dances At a Gathering (1969) and later costumes for The Goldberg Variations at the request of Jerome Robbins of the New York City Ballet.

In the early 70s Joe Eula was a freelance creative art director consultant to Halston Ltd., American Vogue, Interview magazine, and numerous publications.

In 1973, he designed the backdrop of a presentation by five American designers (including Halston) to five French couturiers at Versailles. Due to a botched conversion from imperial to metric units, the drapery they were to use came out short. He famously remedied the situation by adding a white paper strip and sketching the Eiffel Tower with black stove paint and a broom. He was to remain at Halston as a creative director for most of the 70s.

He began consulting for the newly created Halston Enterprise Inc. in 1974, serving as creative director of all Halston images, ad campaigns, and collections from 1974 to 1980.

Eula was artistic director and costume designer for the 1979 musical Got tu Go Disco, a box-office flop on Broadway.

== Death ==
Eula died in hospital on October 27, 2004, at the age of 79, in Kingston, New York. He had been hospitalized for pneumonia and a bad reaction to his chemotherapy. At the time of his death, Eula lived in Manhattan and Hurley, New York.

== Commemoration ==
In 2008 Joe Eula was highlighted as an iconic illustrator in the Line of Fashion Design exhibition at the Leslie Lohman Art Foundation, NY. The following year, 2009, the exhibition was expanded and shown at the Society of Illustrators, NY. Chris Royer contributed several key Joe Eula artworks for the exhibitions.

In 2014 Abigail Franzen-Sheehan edited Halston and Andy Warhol: Silver and Suede, a book published by Abrahms, to which Chris Royer was one of the contributors, as well as an advisor, and supplied selected pieces of Joe Eula artwork for the book.

In 2020 several Joe Eula artworks were shown at the exhibition Fashion Illustration: The Visionaries: A Century of Illustrations from the Frances Neady Collection, by the Society of Illustrators, NY. Chris Royer donated selected Joe Eula artwork from her private collection to the Frances Neady Permanent Collection. Also contributed a short video, Halstonette Memoirs: Joe Eula, produced under CRC Inc. for the exhibition.
