= L'Air du Temps (perfume) =

Nina Ricci perfume

Fragrance by Nina Ricci
- Notes: Jasmin, gardenia, irises, carnation, rose, clove, Mysore's sandalwood.
- Released: 1948
- Label: Nina Ricci
- Tagline: L'amour est dans l'air du temps ("Love fills L'Air du Temps"); L'air du temps se porte comme un espoir ("L'Air du Temps is worn as a hope")

L'Air du Temps is a women's perfume by the French fashion house Nina Ricci. It was created in 1948 by the French perfumer Francis Fabron, in collaboration with Nina Ricci's son Robert (1905–1988), who sought to expand the house's business into an in-house perfumery. It was one of the first fragrances to use a large amount of benzyl salicylate.

In its original production, the perfume was contained in a bottle designed by René Lalique. This perfume is considered as one of the best-selling perfumes at that time.

In the 1991 movie The Silence of the Lambs, Hannibal Lecter identifies L'Air du Temps as a perfume sometimes worn by Clarice Starling.
