= Nina Ricci (brand) =

Fashion house founded by Maria "Nina" Ricci

- Type: Subsidiary
- Industry: Fashion
- Founded: 1932
- Founder: Maria "Nina" Ricci
- Headquarters: Paris, France
- Area served: Worldwide
- Products: Perfumes, clothing, cosmetics, fashion accessories, eyewear, jewelry, watches
- Parent: Puig
- Website: ninaricci.com

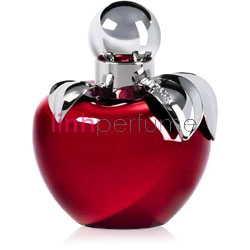
A Nina Ricci perfume

Nina Ricci is a fashion house founded by Maria "Nina" Ricci and her son Robert in Paris in 1932, and owned by the Spanish beauty and fashion group Puig since 1998.

== History and operations ==
The haute couture house was founded in 1932. Nina Ricci designed gowns while her son Robert Ricci managed the business and finances. She worked with the fabrics directly on the mannequin to ensure they had shape once they were finished. Nina Ricci designs soon became known for the refined, romantic, always feminine feeling Maria adds to all of her collections.

In 1941, Robert Ricci created an in-house perfume division.

In 1945, with the war over, designers were casting about for a way to revive the infatuation women had formerly had with haute couture, while raising money for war relief. Robert Ricci had an idea which Lucien Lelong, President of the Chambre, put into action. Over 150 mannequins from 40 Paris couturiers, including Balenciaga and Madame Gres, were dressed in the labels' best fashions and were placed in an exhibition held at the Louvre, in Paris titled Théâtre de la Mode. After a huge success in Paris it toured Europe and then the US.

In 1946, Robert created his first fragrance, Coeur Joie. In 1948, Robert came up with another fragrance, L’Air du Temps, the brand's most popular fragrance, which continues to be a top seller today. Several flight attendant uniforms were designed by the Nina Ricci brand. Nina Ricci is also a pioneer of licensing their designs before the rise of ready-to-wear. As early as 1960, they started licensing their patterns to upscale boutiques such as Chez Ninon in New York City and Betty Clemo in Hong Kong for 'line-to-line' reproduction.

Robert chose the new head designer in 1954, the Belgian Jules-François Crahay. The designs of Crahay were highly praised.

In the early 1960s, a couturier from Melbourne Australia, Elvie Hill, secured a contract to reproduce Nina Ricci for the local Australian market. This proved to be a short-lived partnership as Australian women struggled to fit into the petite and very fitted designs from the Paris fashion house.

Crahay left Ricci in 1963 to go to Lanvin, and was immediately replaced by Gérard Pipart, who had worked at Balmain, Fath and Jean Patou prior to his new job. He continued to carry on the name of Ricci with beautiful and elegant dresses.

After Maria Ricci's death in 1970, Crahay was appointed head of the house. Robert continued to excel in perfumery and business until his death in 1988.

Nathalie Gervais had been the chief designer for the house for several years. She presented her last collection in Fall 2001.

In May 2002 American designer James Aguiar took over as chief designer and designed for the House of Ricci for two seasons.

In 2003, Lars Nilsson took over the house of Ricci with rave reviews from critics. While his role would also involve providing creative input on the beauty side of the business, his primary task was the injection of a dose of excitement, youth and energy into the somewhat dormant fashion and accessories lines. He made a sudden redesign in early 2006, and then in September announced that Brussels-born designer Olivier Theyskens of Rochas would take over the role as head of the label.

In 2009, Theyskens was replaced by designer Peter Copping, who had worked for Louis Vuitton. In 2015, after Peter Copping left the house, Guillaume Henry took the place of Creative director.

During a 2013 fashion show, Ricci designs were targeted by bare-breasted Femen protesters, who grabbed model Hollie-May Saker.

In August 2018, menswear designers Rushemy Botter and Lisi Herrebrugh took over as Creative Directors. The duo left the brand in January 2022.

In September 2022, London-based designer Harris Reed, best known for his gender-fluid designs, was appointed Creative Director. Reed has committed to producing a majority of styles up to at least a size 14, with select pieces going to size 18. This is a significantly larger size range than is standard for a luxury fashion brand, and has been praised as meaningful change on size inclusivity in fashion.

== Creative directors ==
- Nina Ricci (1932–1959)
- Jules-François Crahay (1959–1963)
- Gérard Pipart (1963–1998)
- Nathalie Gervais (1998–2001)
- James Aguiar (2001–2003)
- Lars Nilsson (2003–2006)
- Olivier Theyskens (2006–2009)
- Peter Copping (2009–2014)
- Guillaume Henry (2014–2018)
- Rushemy Botter (2018–2022)
- Lisi Herrebrugh (2018–2022)
- Harris Reed (2022–2026)

== Perfumes ==
Nina Ricci's most famous perfume, L'Air du Temps, created in France in 1948, translates roughly from a French expression as "the current trend". It captures the passion, love, and elegance of an emerging generation Maria and Robert Ricci headed. Robert worked with master perfumer Francis Fabron to create a scent with as much elegance as Madame Maria Ricci's clothes. Marc Lalique created the graceful twin-dove crystal bottle. Other classic Nina Ricci perfumes have included "Farouche", "Capricci", "Fleur de Fleurs", and "Eau de Fleurs"; each has had its own unique Lalique crystal pure perfume bottle. Men's fragrances have included "Signoricci", "Signoricci II", and "Phileas". More recent perfumes have included two different fragrances, both with the name "Nina", and a series of three perfumes under the name "Les Belles de Ricci". Additional fragrances have been added to the line, including "Ricci Ricci", "Love in Paris", "Premier Jour", "Les Delices", "Nina L'Elixir", "Nina L'Eau", and "Nina."
