= Nina Ricci (designer) =

Italian-born French fashion designer (1883–1970)

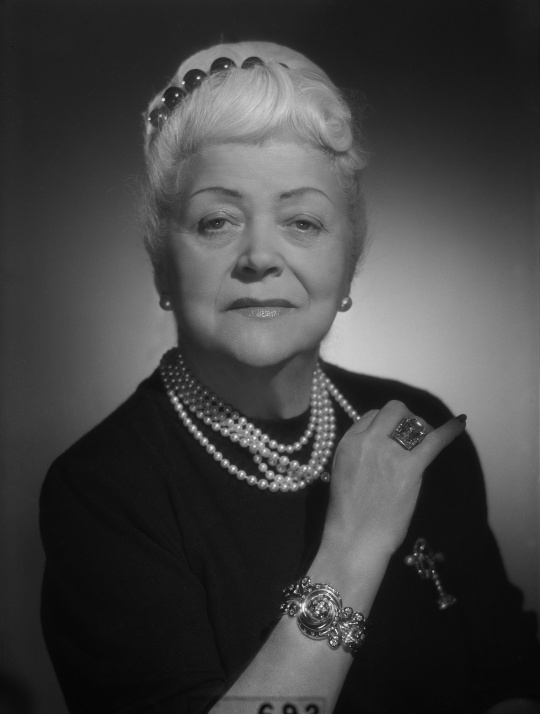
- Born: Maria Nielli; 1883; Turin, Kingdom of Italy
- Died: 28 November 1970 (aged 86–87)
- Occupation: Fashion designer
- Known for: Co-founder of Nina Ricci
- Spouse: Luigi Ricci (m. 1904, died)
- Children: 1

Nina Ricci (born Maria Nielli; 1883 – 28 November 1970) was an Italian-born French fashion designer.

She was born in Turin, Italy, and moved to France at the age of 12.

At the age of 13, she began an apprenticeship at a dressmaker's.

In 1904, she married Luigi Ricci, a music composer and jeweler. They had one child, Robert.

In 1908, she joined the House of Raffin, where she remained for decades.

She and her son Robert founded the fashion house Nina Ricci in Paris in 1932; it has been owned by the Spanish company Puig since 1998.
