= Bill Blass =

American fashion designer

- Born: William Ralph Blass; June 22, 1922; Fort Wayne, Indiana, US
- Died: June 12, 2002 (aged 79); New Preston, Connecticut, US
- Education: Parsons School of Design
- Label: Bill Blass Limited
- Awards: Coty Award seven times; Fashion Institute of Technology Lifetime Achievement Award, 1999

William Ralph Blass (June 22, 1922 – June 12, 2002) was an American fashion designer. He was the recipient of many fashion awards, including seven Coty Awards and the Fashion Institute of Technology's Lifetime Achievement Award (1999).

== Early life, family and education ==
Blass was born in Fort Wayne, Indiana, the son of Ralph Aldrich Blass, a traveling hardware salesman, and his wife, Ethyl (Keyser) Blass.

In his autobiography, Blass wrote that the margins in his schoolbooks were filled with sketches of Hollywood-inspired fashions instead of notes. At age fifteen, he began sewing and selling evening gowns for $25 each to a New York manufacturer. At age seventeen, he had saved enough money to move to Manhattan and study fashion. At age eighteen, he was the first male to win Mademoiselle's Design for Living award. He spent his salary of $30 a week on clothing, shoes and elegant meals.

In 1943, Blass enlisted in the Army. Due to his intelligence and talent, he was assigned to the 603rd Camouflage Battalion, which came to be known as the Ghost Army. Its mission was to deceive the German Army into believing the Allies were positioned in fake locations, for example by using dummy tanks. In a 2002 interview, designer Jack Masey, who served with Blass in the 603rd, remembered him as unusual, even as young man:

A complicated person. But a wonderful person. Giving off exploding energy. Fun, laughs. I knew this person was some day gonna become somebody... Bill took center stage. And everybody kind of loved him. There was this kind of wonderful, generous, explosive quality, which we all found magnetic, and delicious.

He served in this unit at several major operations including the Battle of the Bulge, and the Rhine River crossing. The Ghost Army received the Congressional Gold Medal on March 21, 2024.

== Fashion career ==
After the war, Blass returned to New York in Sutton Place, Manhattan, and was promptly hired as Anne Klein's assistant. However, he was soon fired; allegedly, Anne told him that while he had good manners, he had no talent. He was a protégé of Baron Nicolas de Gunzburg. In 1970, after two decades of success in menswear and womenswear, he bought Maurice Rentner Ltd., which he had joined in 1959, and renamed it Bill Blass Limited.

Over the next 30 years he expanded his line to include swimwear, furs, luggage, perfume, and chocolate. In 1967, he was the first American couture fashion designer to start a menswear line. That part of his business grew to offer everything from ties, socks and belts to suits and evening clothes. It was made by 18 licensees.

Like many designers, his women's-couture collections lost money but served to promote other parts of his business. By the mid-1990s, his ready-to-wear business grossed about $9 million annually and his 97 licensing agreements had retail sales of more than $700 million a year.

His clients, many of whom were also his friends, included Happy Rockefeller, Brooke Astor, Nancy Kissinger, Jessye Norman, Gloria Vanderbilt and Patricia Buckley.

=== Design style ===
Blass is largely credited with creating the relaxed, elegant look that American fashion favored in the late 20th century. In a time period where international attention was solely focused on French fashion, Blass was able to create designs that would eventually shift the focus onto American fashion as well. Inspired by European fashion designers like Coco Chanel, Blass modernized womenswear by allowing them comfort while still maintaining a sense of glamour; he would create designs typical of sportswear, but create them using luxurious fabrics. His signature style consisted of feminine ruffles, luxury materials such as mink or cashmere, and sharply-cut, simple silhouettes.

Blass's looks would incorporate Golden Age Hollywood's glamour with sportswear, taking sportswear silhouettes, and creating them with luxurious materials such as mink, silk, and cashmere, or blending pieces traditionally found in sportswear with dramatic ball skirts. Blass was the first American to incorporate fabrics traditionally only found in menswear, such as pinstripes and houndstooth, into womenswear. His clothing was always very wearable, a characteristic that set him apart from his contemporaries, as most of them were focused on creating fantastical clothes.

=== Advertisements ===
Blass was one of the first designers bold enough and recognizable enough to star in his own advertisements. In one such campaign launched during the 1960's, Blass was pictured alongside two models wielding machine guns. Text proclaiming "They can't knock off Bill Blass" was emblazoned across the image. Employing witty slogans such as ''Positively Blassphemous", Bill Blass became a celebrity in his own right.

=== Versailles 1973 ===
During November 1973, at the Palace of Versailles, five American fashion designers, one of whom was Bill Blass, faced off against five French designers who were at the time considered to be the best of the best – Hubert de Givenchy, Yves Saint Laurent, Emanuel Ungaro, Pierre Cardin, and Marc Bohan of Christian Dior – in a battle of fashion shows. The event is often credited as the event that put American fashion in the international spotlight.

=== The Bill Blass Edition Continental Mark series ===
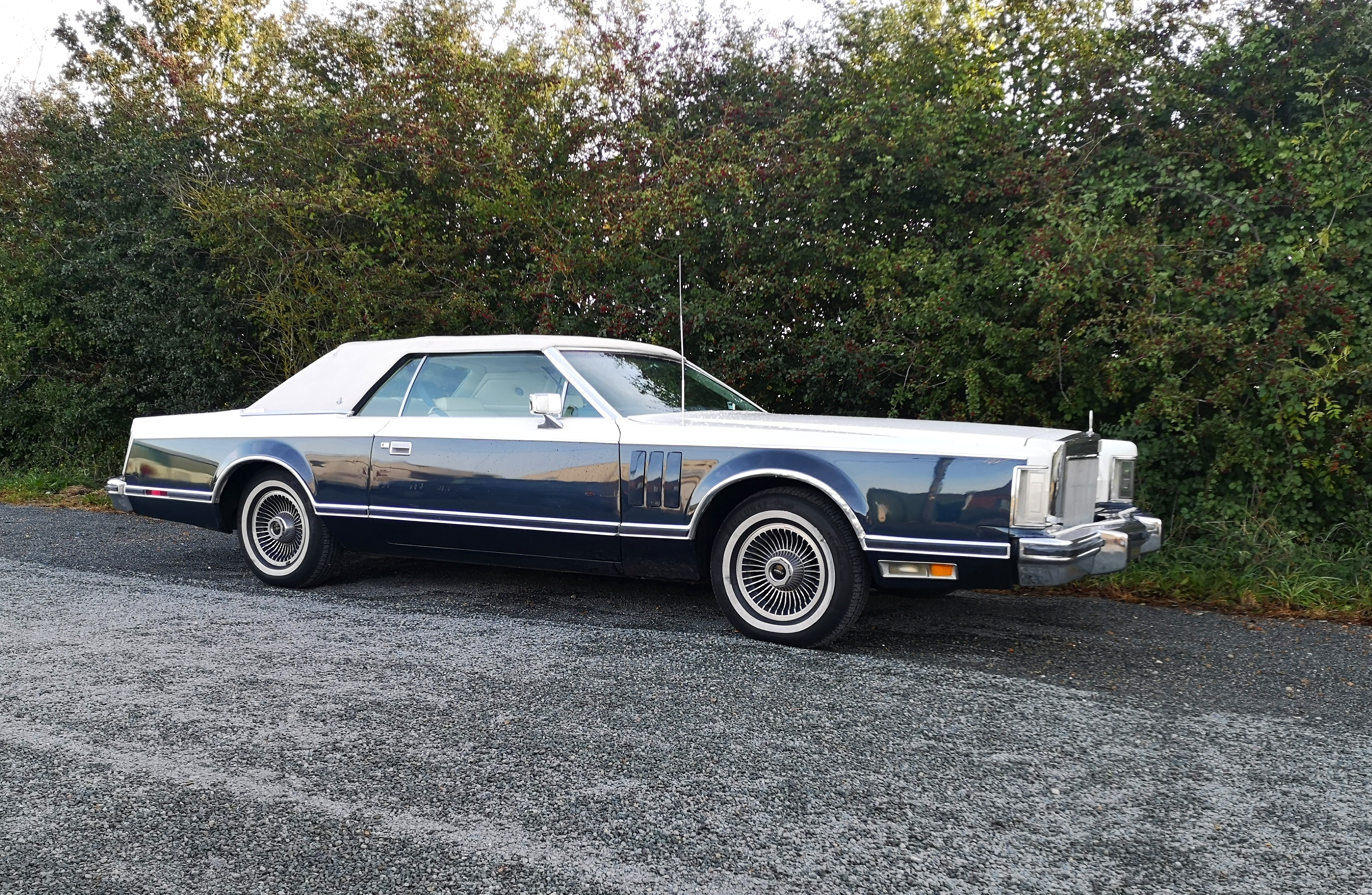
1979 Lincoln Mark V Bill Blass Edition

Beginning in 1975, and continuing until 1992, Blass lent his talents to the Ford Motor Company for an edition of their Continental Mark series of automobiles. In 1976, he shared model configurations with Emilio Pucci, Hubert de Givenchy, and Cartier. Each year, as goes true fashion, the interior and exterior color combinations would be updated. One of the most popular was the 1979 edition honoring a nautical theme, as did the Blass logo of the time. Small anchors were incorporated into the exterior accent striping and interior accents within the Blass "back-to-back B" design theme. The 1979 through 1983 Mark series Blass models were available with a "carriage roof" giving a convertible top look to the cars. After 1983, the Bill Blass edition became a color option with rear quarter window model designations and a few features that were options on the standard model.

== Awards and recognition ==
Over the years, Blass won three Coty American Fashion Critics Awards. He won the 1968 Coty for men's wear. The Council of Fashion Designers of American awarded Blass their Lifetime Achievement Award in 1987 and was the group's first winner of their Humanitarian Leadership Award in 1996. He was also named to the International Best Dressed List Hall of Fame List.

== Philanthropy ==
In 1994, Blass gave $10 million to the New York Public Library. In recognition of the gift, the Public Catalog Room of the New York Public Library Main Branch at Fifth Avenue and 42nd Street was named the Bill Blass Public Catalogue Room.

== Retirement and death ==
In 1999, Blass sold Bill Blass Limited for $50 million to Michael Groveman and retired to his home in New Preston, Connecticut. Blass, a longtime heavy smoker, was diagnosed with oral/tongue cancer in 2000, not long after he began writing his memoir. His cancer later developed into throat cancer, resulting in his death on June 12, 2002, ten days away from his 80th birthday.

Blass collected art and was a connoisseur of antiquities and in his will bequeathed half of his $52 million estate, as well as several important ancient sculptures, to the Metropolitan Museum of Art.

== Quotes ==
"The beauty of being able to draw, or paint, from an early age is that you never feel trapped, least of all by your immediate circumstances."

"The secret of living is not staying too long. I have learned when to leave the party."

"When in doubt, wear red."

"Fashion can be bought by anybody; style takes discernment, it has to do with individuality."

"Sometimes the eye gets so accustomed that if you don't have a change, you're bored. It's the same with fashion, you know. And that, I suppose, is what style is about."

"Simplicity is the soul of modern elegance."

== Publications ==
- Dining in Manhattan Cookbook: A Collection of Gourmet Recipes for Complete Meals from Manhattan's Finest Restaurants, with Joan G. Hauser (1983)
- Bare Blass, edited by Cathy Horyn (2002)

== See also ==
- Bill Blass Group
