= Nicolas Puech =

French businessman

- Born: 1943 (age 82–83); Neuilly-sur-Seine, France
- Occupation: Businessman
- Known for: Part-owner of Hermès
- Parents: Francis Puech (father); Yvonne Hermès (mother)
- Relatives: Thierry Hermès (great-great-grandfather)

Nicolas Puech (born 1943) is a French businessman who is a fifth-generation descendant of Thierry Hermès, the founder of luxury goods company Hermès. He resigned from the Hermès supervisory board in 2014, but maintained over 5% of the company's shares. Puech has attempted to sell this stake, but has indicated that he does not have access to his shares.

== Family ==
Puech was born in 1943 at Neuilly-sur-Seine in France, the son of Francis Puech and Yvonne Hermès. His mother was a great-granddaughter of Thierry Hermès. Puech is the brother of Bertrand Puech and the cousin of Jean-Louis Dumas.

== Personal life ==
Puech is a bachelor and lives in Martigny, Switzerland.

== Wealth ==
In 2023, the Swiss media reported that Puech intended to cancel his inheritance contract with the Isocrates Foundation and leave half of his fortune to his former gardener, whom he planned to adopt. The charitable foundation, which Puech established and is board president, formally opposed the annulment.

In the Forbes list of The Richest People In The World, dated 8 March 2024, Puech ranked #121 with a net worth of $15.6 billion. However, Forbes removed him from its billionaires list in 2025 because, according to Puech, his "fortune has vanished". According to The New York Times, Puech had agreed to sell his Hermès shares to the ruling family of Qatar, but he told the Swiss government that his shares had allegedly been taken by a wealth advisor. A related lawsuit was filed against Puech in the United States.

=== Fraud ===
Puech's "vanished" fortune is the subject of ongoing investigation. Puech has accused his former money manager, Éric Freymond, of isolating him from friends and family so that Freymond could siphon away a massive fortune

According to testimony reviewed by the Wall Street Journal, Freymond told magistrates that he sold off most of Puech's Hermès holdings to LVMH more than a decade prior, and that Puech was aware of the sales. However, Puech denied that allegation in his own testimony. Puech admitted that he had signed a sweeping agreement for Freymond to manage his money and dispose of assets, but Puech claims that his original inherited shares in Hermès were not to be sold.

Independent audits found varying money trails that appeared to be connected to Freymond, including the opening of joint accounts. The audit showed that Puech had put €35.8 million into Geneva bank Gonet and that outgoing transfers mainly benefited Freymond, who spent money on a range of purchases, from stocks to art. When the account was closed with €15 million in it, the balance was also transferred to Freymond.

An investigation of the fraud by The Economist reported that Freymond claimed that he had been in a romantic relationship with Puech. According to his court testimony, the affair had lasted about 15 years and ended in 2016.

On 23 July 2025, Freymond died after being struck by a train near his home in Switzerland, and the death appears to have been a suicide.
