= Pascale Mussard =

French artistic director (born 1957)

Pascale Mussard (née Siegrist, born 31 October 1954) is a descendant of Thierry Hermès; and the co-artistic director of Hermès, the French company.

== Early life and career ==
In her youth, Mussard often spent time in the ateliers of Hermès, contrary to the precedent of her family members. She was interested in science and often visited the Cité des Sciences et de l'Industrie in Paris's Parc de la Villette. Her first internship was at a ball mill in Germany.

After studying law and business at the European Business School in London, she worked in the export department of a commercial printer. Her uncle, Jean-Louis Dumas, the head of the firm as well as the artistic director, arranged for her to be a Poisson Pilote at the Nicole de Vésian styling agency in 1978. (Poisson Pilote, or "pilot fish" in English, is someone who leads the way under delicate circumstances.)

Subsequently, Pascale became the head fabric buyer for women's ready-to-wear at Hermès. From there, she became a press attaché and then, the head of advertising and public relations. These assignments were followed by her creating a department for exhibitions. Subsequently, she set up and directed the shop-windows department.

== Mid-career ==
In 2002, Jean-Louis Dumas made Mussard his assistant and the delegate artistic director alongside Pierre-Alexis Dumas.

Until her activities as the co-artistic director ceased in 2011, Mussard had been in charge of the accessories and leather goods sectors of the firm, which still include the "Kelly" and "Birkin" bags. Mussard worked toward bringing the firm into a sustainable future.

She and Pierre-Alexis Dumas, twelve years her junior, worked to address concerns that the brand would fall from grace when her uncle and Pierre-Alexis's father, Jean-Louis Dumas, died in 2010.

Accolades include Mussard's being designated one of the "Ten Women to Watch in Europe" by The Wall Street Journal in 2008.

== Present activities ==
Mussard is the mother of three sons. She is currently the director of the "Petit h" division of Hermès, which some call a labo-atelier. It positions itself around the goal of increasing recycling. Discarded animal skins from the "Kelly" and "Birkin" bags, other leatherwear, and various elements, such as handles, hardware, and discarded ceramics, are used as materials for new works.
