= Nishanian =

Nishanian (Armenian: Նշանեան) is an Armenian surname. In diaspora the surname may be variously transliterated as Nichanian, Nişanyan, Nishanyan, etc. Notable people with the surname include:

- Mesrob Nishanian of Jerusalem (1872–1944), Armenian Patriarch of Jerusalem
- Mikaël Nichanian, (born 1970), French historian
- Sevan Nişanyan, Turkish-Armenian writer and lexicographer
- Véronique Nichanian, French fashion designer
