= Véronique Nichanian =

French fashion designer

- Born: May 3, 1954 (age 72)
- Occupation: Fashion designer
- Years active: 1976–present
- Known for: Artistic director of Hermès menswear (1988–2026)

Véronique Nichanian (born May 3, 1954) is a French-Armenian fashion designer. She was the artistic director of Hermès' menswear division 37 years, from 1988 to 2026.

== Early life ==
Nichanian was born in France and studied at the École de la Chambre Syndicale de la Couture Parisienne. She graduated in 1976; her training there had focused on womenswear, and she worked on menswear for the first time after entering the industry.

She is of Armenian descent on her father's side.

== Career ==
In 1976, Nichanian began her career at Cerruti, working under Nino Cerruti, before joining Hermès in 1988 to lead its menswear division. Cerruti hired her directly from design school. On joining Hermès, she was told by its head, Jean-Louis Dumas, to run the menswear division "like your little enterprise", with "carte blanche". She was one of the few women to design menswear at a major luxury house. At Hermès, her focus has been developing menswear collections that incorporate new textiles and materials.

Nichanian's collections emphasize fabric selection and subtle modifications to classic menswear styles rather than major seasonal shifts. She has been noted for being one of the few women leading a menswear division at a major luxury fashion house.

Nichanian is the longest-serving creative director in fashion, having held her role for 37 years as of 2025. In October 2025, Nichanian announced she would be stepping down from her role at Hermès. Her final collection will be presented in January 2026. In October 2025 Grace Wales Bonner was announced as her successor.

Nichanian presented her final collection, her 76th show, on January 24, 2026, during Men's Fashion Week, staged at the city's historic former stock exchange building. She said she planned to spend several months in Japan. Hermès womenswear has been designed by Nadège Vanhee-Cybulski since 2014.
