= The Coffee Planter of Saint Domingo =

Book by Pierre Joseph Laborie

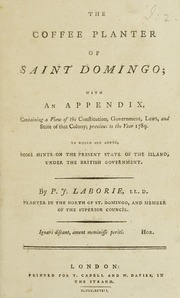
- Title page of the first edition
- Author: Pierre Joseph Laborie
- Published: 1798
- Publisher: T. Cadell & W. Davies

The Coffee planter of Saint Domingo is a 1798 manual for building and operating a coffee plantation in Jamaica. It was written by Pierre Joseph Laborie, a planter from Saint Domingue. Writing the book for novice English planters, Laborie devoted much attention to the exploitation of slave labor.

Laborie established a division of labor using three criteria: skill, class and age. Skilled labor involved carpenters, masons and saddlers. Unskilled labor involved field workers. Laborie proposed appointing slaves to supervisory positions.

Laborie also divided labor by age. Small children were assigned to weeding and pruning. Children between ages of 12 and 16 were weeding and gathering coffee. Adults did the field work. The elderly supervised the children and guarded poultry and provisions.

== Contents ==
The book is divided into four chapters and an appendix, and includes 22 plates.

=== To the Reader ===
(pp. iii-vi)

=== Contents ===
(pp. vii-xii)

=== Introduction ===
(pp. 1–3)

=== Chapter I ===
(pp. 4–42)

Of the choice of Ground, and of whatever relates to the grubbing of it; the first plantations, and more particularly the accessory articles.

=== Chapter II ===
(pp. 43–102)

Of the settlements; viz. Constructions, Buildings, Work Houses, Engines, Platforms, Dwelling and Out-Houses, Negro Houses, and Stables–and first of the Preparation of Coffee for the Market

=== Chapter III ===
(pp. 103–156)

Of the Culture of Coffee Tree during the several Periods of its duration

=== Chapter IV ===
(pp. 157–196)

Of the Government and Care of the Negroes

Here Laborie provides his view on the essence of the philosophical and political system of the planter:

It is necessary then, to turn this our property to the best account. We must extract from the negroe all the work he can reasonably perform, and use very means to prolong his life. If interest direct the first, humanity enjoins the second, and here they go hand in hand. Happy accord! the consciousness of which forms the whole philosophical and political system of the planter; all the magic of the supreme power of one chief, and of that entire submission of the many, which would still have subsisted unimpaired in this island, had not the fatal French revolution introduced principles, incompatible with the conditions of the country.

=== Appendix ===
(pp. 1–145)

A review of the government, constitution, laws and state of St. Domingo, before the revolution, and under the British government.
