= Axel Dumas =

French billionaire heir and business executive

- Born: 3 July 1970 (age 56); Neuilly-sur-Seine, France
- Education: Paris-Sorbonne University; Sciences Po; Harvard Business School
- Occupation: Businessman
- Title: CEO, Hermès
- Term: June 2013-
- Predecessor: Patrick Thomas
- Spouse: Elisabeth Franck
- Relatives: Jean-Louis Dumas (uncle); Pierre-Alexis Dumas (cousin)

Axel Dumas (born 3 July 1970) is a French billionaire heir and business executive. He is the chief executive officer (CEO) of Hermès, and a sixth-generation member of the Hermès-Dumas family.

== Early life ==
Axel Dumas was born on 3 July 1970 in Neuilly-sur-Seine near Paris. His ancestor five times removed, Thierry Hermès, founded Hermès in 1837. His paternal uncle, Jean-Louis Dumas, was the CEO of Hermès. His father, Olivier Dumas, is a physician and the author of many articles about Jules Verne. His mother died in 2003. His cousin, Pierre-Alexis Dumas, is Hermes's artistic director. He is a sixth-generation member of the Hermès-Dumas family.

Dumas earned a bachelor's degree in philosophy from Paris-Sorbonne University and a master of Laws. He graduated from Sciences Po, and he attended an executive program at the Harvard Business School.

== Career ==
Dumas was an investment banker for Paribas in Beijing, China from 1995 to 1997, in Paris from 1997 to 1999, and in New York City from 1999 to 2003.

Dumas joined Hermès as an auditor in 2003. He became the CEO of its jewellery division in 2006, and the CEO of its leather goods division in 2008. He was appointed as chief operating officer of the company in June 2013, supervised by Patrick Thomas until his departure in January 2014.

== Personal life ==
Dumas is married to Elisabeth Franck, a journalist for Libération.

With his family, Dumas is an heir to a 30 billion € fortune, making them France's third richest family as of 2017.
