= Pierre-Alexis Dumas =

French artistic director (born 1966)

- Born: June 4, 1966 (age 60)
- Education: Brown University
- Occupation: Artistic director of hermès
- Father: Jean-Louis Dumas

Pierre-Alexis Dumas (born June 4, 1966) is a French businessman and current artistic director of Hermès. A descendant of the company's founder, Thierry Hermès, he is also the son of the former CEO Jean-Louis Dumas and the architect Rena Gregoriadès. He became artistic director of Hermès in 2005, playing a key role in defining the brand's creative vision and developing its various product lines. He also created 2008 the Hermès foundation, which supports craftsmanship, art and environmental protection.

== Biography ==
=== Family and education ===
Pierre-Alexis Dumas was born on June 4, 1966. His parents are Jean-Louis Dumas, former CEO of the Hermès group and Rena Gregoriadès, an architect of Greek origin who in 1972 founded Rena Dumas Architecture Intérieur in Paris. He has an older sister, Sandrine Dumas, born on April 28, 1963 in Neuilly-sur-Seine, who is an Actor and director. At the age of eleven, his grandfather Robert Dumas, then head of Hermès, taught him the saddle-stitch technique, which contributed to the house's reputation in leather crafting. In 1991, he received a Bachelor of Arts in visual arts from Brown University in Providence, Rhode Island, United States.

Pierre-Alexis Dumas married Sophie Bouilhet in 1996, a member of the Christofle silverware manufacturing family, with whom he has three children.

=== Career ===
From September 1991, Pierre-Alexis Dumas spent ten months with the Ratti company in Como, Italy, where silk had been spun since the 19th century. During his stay, he was introduced to engraving techniques for printed textiles, colouring and pattern design, particularly for women's fashion. It was in Hong Kong, in 1992, that he made his debut at Hermès, after Patrick Thomas, then managing director, sent him on an internship to learn about distribution. He stayed there for five years, in particular to set up the Chinese subsidiary and open the first shop in Beijing. He then left for London in 1998 and spent four years as head of the UK subsidiary, before joining an art school.

In 2002, Dumas joined the Hermès Group at the family firm's headquarters in Paris, and then was involved with the development of new products by silversmiths Puiforcat (founded in 1830) and crystal manufacturer St. Louis (founded in 1586), both Hermès acquisitions. The same year he took over the Hermès's public relations department. In 2008, Dumas created Fondation d'Entreprise Hermès, which supports art entrepreneurs around the world. He has been the artistic director of Hermès since 2011.

=== Other commitments ===
Pierre-Alexis Dumas created the Hermès corporate foundation in 2008, which supports the handicraft, in particular know-how and its transmission, but also young artists, who can enter a residency in the company's factories. With a budget of 25.2 million euros in 2023, it is developing its own patronage programmes, such as the organisation of exhibitions and cultural events.

In December 2015, Pierre-Alexis Dumas was appointed president of the Musée des Arts Décoratifs in Paris. He is one of the directors of the Protestant Solidarity of France and Armenia association, and treasurer of L'imprimerie d'art de Montparnasse – CFF: Centre Français des Fonds et Fondations (Endowment Fund for the Preservation of the Artistic Printing House de Montparnasse), which since 1881 has managed the preservation of lithographer Charles Alphonse du Fresnoy's work.

== Distinctions ==
- Knight of the Legion of Honour (2013)
- Knight of the Order of Arts and Letters (2023)
