= Grace Wales Bonner =

English fashion designer (born 1990)

Grace Wales Bonner MBE
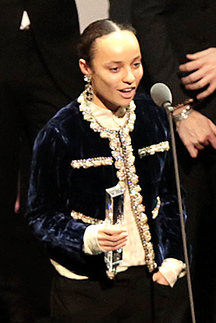
- Wales Bonner in 2015
- Born: Grace Wales; 1990 (age 35–36); South London, England
- Education: Central Saint Martins (BA)
- Occupation: Fashion designer
- Employer: University of Applied Arts, Vienna
- Awards: British Fashion Awards
- Website: walesbonner.net/pages/about

Grace Wales Bonner (born 1990) is an English fashion designer. Her designs blend sportswear, tailoring and broad cultural research. In 2014, she founded the London-based label Wales Bonner, originally specializing in menswear. In 2025, she was appointed creative director of the Hermès menswear line, succeeding Véronique Nichanian, and becoming the first woman of Black heritage to lead a major luxury fashion house. Wales Bonner's first collection for Hermès is set to be shown in January 2027.

Since founding her eponymous brand, Wales Bonner has won awards including Emerging Menswear Designer at the British Fashion Awards (2015), the LVMH Young Designer Prize (2016), Winner of the British Fashion Council/ Vogue Designer Fashion Fund (2019) and CFDA International Men's Designer of the Year (2021). In June 2022, she was appointed Member of the Order of the British Empire (MBE) for services to fashion. Wales Bonner was the lead of a four year research project at the University of Applied Arts, Vienna.

== Early life ==
Wales Bonner was born in South London, England, to a White English mother and Black Jamaican father, and after her parents' separation was brought up between her mother's house in Dulwich and her father's in Stockwell.

Wales Bonner studied at Graveney School in Tooting, then attended Central Saint Martins art school, graduating in 2014, and winning the L'Oréal Professionnel Talent Award for her BA collection "Afrique". Subsequent awards she has received include "Emerging Talent – Menswear" at the 2015 British Fashion Awards, the 2016 LVMH Prize for Young Fashion Designers, the British Fashion Council/Vogue Designer Fashion Fund (2019), the CFDA International Men's Designer of the Year (2021), Best Independent British Brand (2022) the 2023 British Fashion Council/GQ Designer Fashion Fund, and British Menswear Designer of the Year (2024).

During her studies, Wales Bonner briefly lived in New York in 2013 to assist Vogue fashion editor Camilla Nickerson.

== Career ==
Wales Bonner's debut collection, "Ebonics", was presented in 2015 at Fashion East in London. She presented two runway shows the following year, Malik and Spirituals, after which she was awarded the LVMH prize.

Wales Bonner continued to show her collections in London, until she was invited as guest designer of Pitti Uomo in Florence, Italy, for the presentation of the brand's Spring Summer 2023 collection. Since its Autumn Winter 2023 show, Wales Bonner has exhibited shows on the Paris Fashion Week Men's Calendar.

In 2019, she curated her debut show, A Time For New Dreams, at the Serpentine Gallery, which was an exploration of magical resonances within black cultural and aesthetic practices, and focused on the shrine "as a symbolic pathway for imagining different worlds and possibilities". It was described as "a bringing together of multiple interdisciplinary creative practices: music, fashion, art and design". The exhibition, which attracted 25,000 visitors, took its name from a collection of essays by Nigerian writer Ben Okri, and included work by several artists (including Chino Amobi, the Black Audio Film Collective, David Hammons, Rotimi Fani-Kayode, Liz Johnson Artur, Rashid Johnson, Kapwani Kiwanga, Eric N. Mack and Paul Mpagi Sepuya), featuring Okri's words on the wall, as well as footage of African-American writer Ishmael Reed. At the show's opening, Reed performed on piano and Okri recited a poem written for the occasion. According to Hans-Ulrich Obrist, artistic director of the Serpentine Gallery: "Grace is a fashion designer, but she's also a thinker, a writer, and an editor. She makes connections between different fields, from music to art." In acknowledgement of the influence of Reed's satirical novel Mumbo Jumbo, Wales Bonner borrowed its title as the name for her Autumn Winter 2019 collection.

Alongside her independent collections, Wales Bonner worked for the British label Meadham Kirchhoff early in her career. Her wider network has included graphic designer Peter Miles, who created the Wales Bonner logo, and the Savile Row tailor Anderson & Sheppard, with which she was developing a partnership by 2024.

Following the opening of A Time for New Dreams at Serpentine Galleries, Wales Bonner presented a musical series titled Devotional Sound. Performers at the London event included Sampha, Laraaji, and Klein. The series was continued in New York in a set of performances at St. Peter's Church from Solange, Standing on the Corner, and Laraaji.

In that same year, Wales Bonner was invited by Maria Grazia Chiuri to collaborate with Dior to re-interpret the house's New Look silhouette for its Resort 2020 collection. The following year, in 2020, Wales Bonner was recognised as one of the United Kingdom's most influential people of African or African Caribbean heritage by being included in the 2021 edition of the annual Powerlist.

Wales Bonner has collaborated with sportswear brand Adidas on seasonal collections as well as official kits for the Jamaican Football Federation. In 2022, she collaborated with renowned American artist Kerry James Marshall on a limited-edition T-shirt. Since 2020, Wales Bonner and Adidas have collaborated on 25 sold-out sneakers.

Wales Bonner was appointed as a Member of the Order of the British Empire (MBE) in the 2022 Birthday Honours for services to fashion.

In 2023, Wales Bonner curated an exhibition at the Museum of Modern Art New York, titled Spirit Movers, as part of the museum's Artist's Choice series. The exhibition consisted of nearly 40 artworks from the museum's collection that explore sound, movement, performance, and style in the African diaspora and beyond. The exhibition featured two unseen works held in the MoMA Collection from artists David Hammons and Moustapha Dimé, alongside works from around the world and across generations including Agnes Martin, Betye Saar, Terry Adkins, and Man Ray. It was accompanied by the artist's book Dream in the Rhythm: Visions of Sound and Spirit in the MoMA collection, which collected photography from the MoMA collection along with reprinted poetry and original texts from British painter Lynette Yiadom-Boakye and American writer Ishmael Reed. The Spirit Movers exhibition was selected as a Critic's Pick by the New York Times. In a New Yorker profile, critic Vince Aletti described the exhibition and catalogue as "the product of a sensibility that’s both sophisticated and intuitive, making connections across periods, mediums, and styles which are so unexpected that every object seems new.".

Wales Bonner was on the host committee of the 2025 MET Gala in New York, and created looks for guests Lewis Hamilton, FKA Twigs, Omar Apollo, Jeff Goldblum, Tyler Mitchell, Monica L. Milller, and Eric N. Mack. Her work was also included in the Metropolitan Museum of Art's Summer Exhibition, Superfine: Tailoring Black Style. A look from the Wales Bonner Spring Summer 2017 Show, Ezekiel, was on the cover of the exhibition's catalogue photographed by Tyler Mitchell.

Wales Bonner has also collaborated with visual artists as part of its seasonal collections and runway presentations, including Kerry James Marshall, Theaster Gates, Chris Ofili, Ibrahim Mahama, Joy Gregory, Frank Bowling, Jacob Lawrence, Terry Adkins and Lubaina Himid.

Wales Bonner's work in music continued with the event series Togetherness, presented in Paris in 2024 with performers E'tran de l'Aïr, Mansur Brown, La Fève and DJ Sarz. The second Togetherness event was presented at the Guggenheim New York alongside artist Rashid Johnson's major retrospective, A Poem for Deep Thinkers, and included performers Fireboy DML, Amaarae, KeiyaA, Navy Blue, The Cavemen, The Joy, and Sir Rashad Ringo Smith.

She was appointed creative director of the Hermès menswear line in 2025, following the departure of Véronique Nichanian, who had been in charge of the line from 1988 to 2026. Wales Bonner's first collection will be shown in January 2027.

== Awards ==
- 2015: Emerging Menswear Designer at the British Fashion Awards
- 2016: LVMH Young Designer Prize
- 2018: Emerging Design Medal, London Design Festival
- 2019: Winner of the British Fashion Council/Vogue Designer Fashion Fund
- 2021: CFDA International Men's Designer of the Year
- 2022: appointed Member of the Order of the British Empire (MBE)
- 2022: Best Independent British Brand at the Fashion Awards
- 2023: British Fashion Council/GQ Designer Fashion Fund Winner
- 2024: British Menswear Designer of the Year at the Fashion Awards
