= Lola Prusac =

French fashion designer (1895–1985)

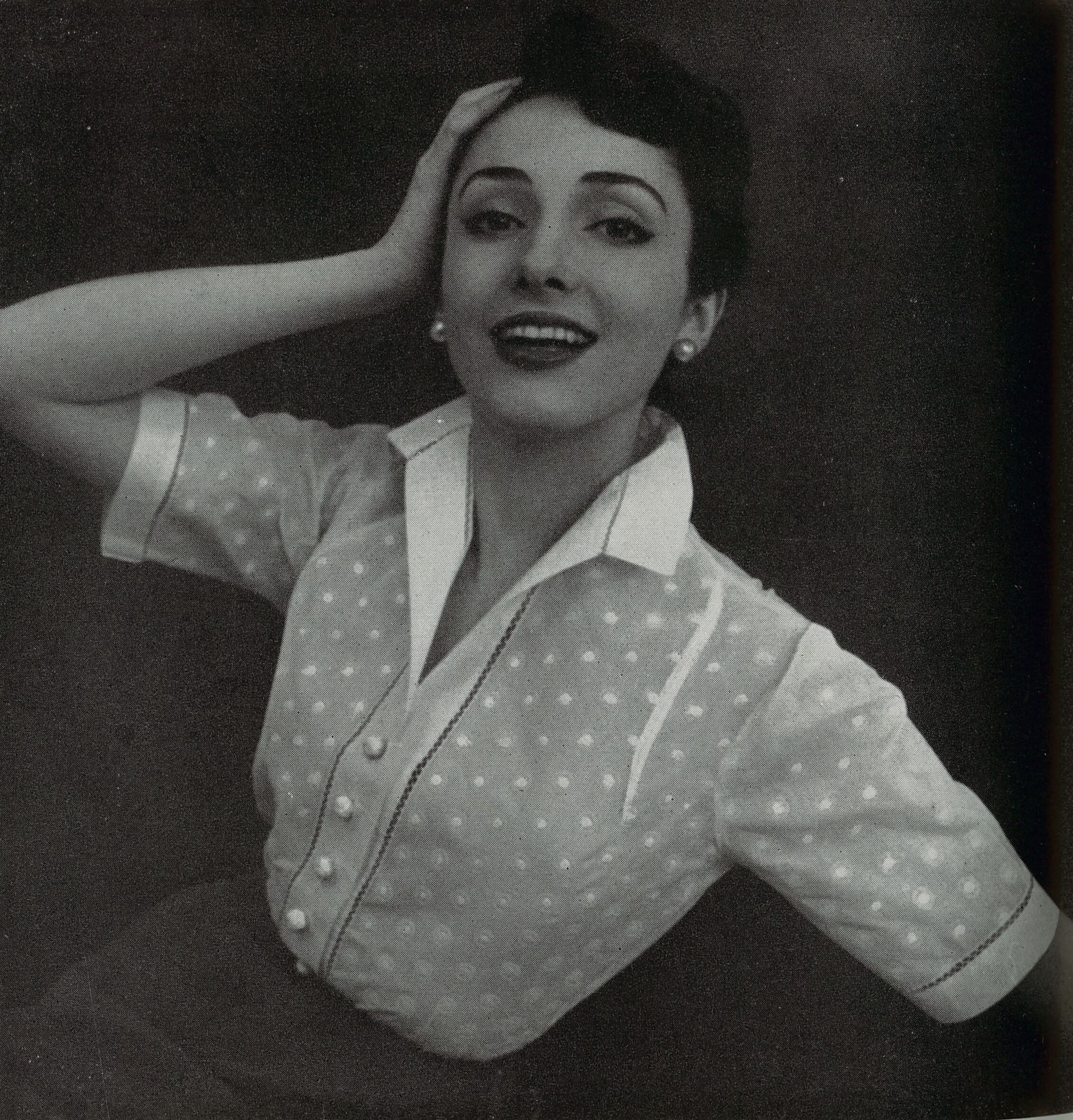
Blouse designed by Lola Prusac in Vogue May 1, 1951.

Lola Prusac (18 January 1895 – 29 October 1985) was a Polish-born French fashion designer noted for her inventive and original way of dressing

== Early life ==
She worked for Hermès in Paris between 1925 and 1935. She was first "with the unusual position of counselor for colors", then as a modéliste (designer). At Hermès she designed in 1929 their first women collection, silk squares,. and in the early 1930s bags with geometric inlays inspired by the Dutch painter Mondrian.

In 1936, she founded her own fashion house, specialising in "sport-tricot" (casual knits) clothes. For this reason, though she had been a member since 1942, the Chambre Syndicale de la Haute Couture denied her in 1952 the "Couture-Création" status.

In 1978, Lola Prusac received an aiguille d'or (golden needle), a French award sometimes granted together with the more prestigious dé d'or (golden thimble)..
