= Nadège Vanhée =

French fashion designer (born 1978)

- Born: 30 May 1978 (age 48); Seclin, France
- Education: Royal Academy of Fine Arts of Antwerp; Institut Français de la Mode
- Occupation: Fashion designer
- Label: Hermès International
- Children: 1

Nadège Vanhée-Cybulski (born 30 May 1978) is a French fashion designer and the creative director of Hermès International.

== Biography ==
Nadège Vanhée was born on 30 May 1978 in Seclin, France, to a French father and an Algerian mother. She studied fashion design at the Royal Academy of Fine Arts of Antwerp, graduating in 2003. In the following year, she graduated from the Institut Français de la Mode.

She began her career at the Belgian brand Delvaux in 2003. She was a designer for Phoebe Philo. She was the design director at the Olsen twins' brand, The Row, and also worked at Céline and Maison Martin Margiela.

In June 2014, she was appointed artistic director of Hermès' women ready-to-wear, replacing Christophe Lemaire. In March 2015, she presented her first collection, and stayed close to the brand's roots by choosing an equestrian theme.
