= Sandrine Dumas =

French film actress

- Born: Sandrine Dumas; 28 April 1963 (age 63); Neuilly-sur-Seine, France
- Occupations: Actress, director

Sandrine Dumas (born 28 April 1963) is a French film and stage actress and director.

Dumas was born in Neuilly-sur-Seine. She has appeared in Miloš Forman's Valmont, and Krzysztof Kieślowski's The Double Life of Véronique, among other films.

She is the daughter of Jean-Louis Dumas (2 February 1938 – 1 May 2010), who was the fifth generation of the family to run one of the world's most renowned high fashion house, Hermès.

== Filmography ==
- 1987: The Veiled Man
- 2008 : 48 Hours a Day
- 2014 : 40-Love

=== Direction ===
- 2011 : L'Invention des jours heureux with Katia Golubeva, Prix du Public of the Créteil International Women's Film Festival
- 2015 : Nostos, selected for the 2016 Thessaloniki Documentary Festival
- 2019 : On ment toujours à ceux qu'on aime with Monia Chokri and Jérémie Elkaïm

== Theater ==
She won the Globes de Cristal Award for Best Play for directing Love Letters in 2006.
