= École Duperré =

Public art and design college in Paris, France

Coordinates: 48°51′55.01″N 2°21′43.27″E

École Supérieure des Arts Appliqués Duperré (ESAA Duperré)
- Type: Public
- Established: 1864 by Élisa Lemonnier
- Director: Alain Soreil
- Students: 500
- Undergraduates: BA
- Postgraduates: Master
- Location: Paris, France
- Website: duperre.org

The Duperré School of Applied Arts is a public college of art and design. The school is located in the Rue Dupetit-Thouars, in the 3rd arrondissement of Paris, near the Carreau du Temple, in the heart of Le Marais.

Duperré School trains students for creative careers in fashion and textiles, as well as environmental and graphic design. In addition it has training programmes for designer-makers in textiles (embroidery, weaving and tapestry) and ceramics.

== History ==
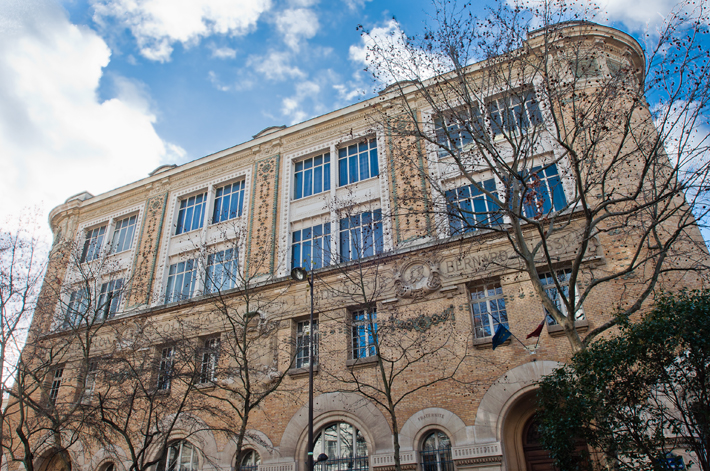
Duperré School Facade.

- 1864: creation of a school of applied arts for girls, by the Company for Vocational Teaching of Women, founded by Élisa Lemonnier, situated in the rue Rochechouart.
- 1882: the school moved to new premises, 24 rue Duperré, Paris 9th arrondissement. Sewing and artistic professions were given the highest importance.
- 1906: the City of Paris bought the rue Duperré school from the Company for Vocational Teaching of Women.
- 1921: Duperré School exhibition in the musée Galliera.
- 1923: inauguration of the new School of Applied Arts for Industry (for boys) located in the rue Dupetit-Thouars and known affectionately as the Zarza (Arts-A).
- 1925: participation, with the three other municipal applied arts schools, in the International Exhibition of Decorative and Modern Industrial Arts in Paris. From this time, the teaching staff came under the Ministry of Education. The school was called : the Municipal School of Drawing and Art Applied to Industry. It prepared a diploma with two possible specializations : textile and wallpaper creation and advertising (graphic arts, posters) and a large choice of craft workshops.
- 1970: the school moved from the rue Duperré to the rue Dupetit-Thouars, Paris 3rd. It moved into the premises of the Applied Arts School for boys which went to the rue Olivier de Serres in the 15th arrondissement. The school became co-educational and took the name École Supérieure d'Arts Appliqués (Higher School of Applied Arts) like the three other schools in Paris.
- 1981–1983: creation of the DSAA (higher diploma in applied arts) Fashion and Environment, a level II Diploma. The old diploma was phased out. The school only provided courses in higher education.
- 1987: creation of the DMA (designer-makers diploma) "textiles and ceramics", which enabled the school to continue teaching rare crafts which used to be part of the diploma awarded by the school. The school became part of the Erasmus programme of European exchanges and of the international network of design schools, Cumulus.
- 1993: creation of the European Master in fashion and textile, in partnership with the Institut Français de la Mode.
- 2005: creation of a Bachelor's programme in fashion design, in partnership with the University of Marne la Vallée.
- 2007: Masters in Luxury, in partnership with the University of Marne la Vallée.
- 2011: Higher Diploma of the Design Schools of the city of Paris (master's level), joint diploma of Boulle, Duperré and Estienne Schools.
- 2014: the Duperré School becomes regular member of the IFFTI (International Foundation of Fashion Technology Institutes).
- 2015: first issue of Modes Pratiques, Revue d'Histoire du Vêtement et de la Mode, published by the Duperré School and the University Lille III.

== Courses and diplomas ==
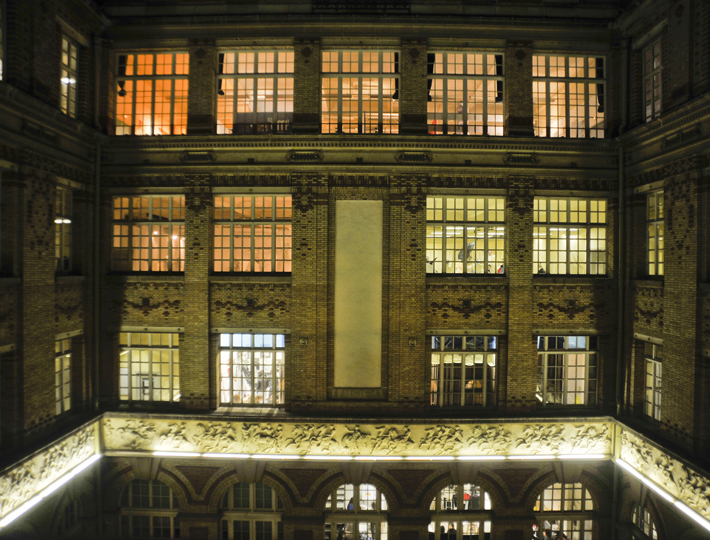
Duperré School Courtyard.

Duperré school takes 500 students every year and delivers diplomas in Applied Arts at level III — BTS and DMA, at level II — vocational bachelor's degree carried out in partnership with the university of Marne-la-Vallée and level I — Master's degree, within the framework of a higher diploma in applied arts (DSAA Design. Option: fashion). Since September 2011 there are further possibilities for study and research after the DSAA with a post-DSAA carried out in partnership with Boule School and Estienne School.

- Foundation course in applied arts (MANAA),
- Degree in Textile Designer-makers and Degree in Ceramic Designer-makers (DMA),
- 4 different degrees in Design (BTS),
  - Degree in Fashion Design,
  - Degree in Textile-Material-Surface Design,
  - Degree in Graphic Design,
  - Degree in Environmental & Interior Design,
- High Diploma of Fashion Design (DSAA)
  - Major in Fashion and Environmental Design,
  - Major in Images Media and Editorial
- Higher Diploma of the Design Schools of the City of Paris,
- 3 different bachelor's degrees
  - Fashion, Textile and Environmental Design, under the supervision of University of Marne la Vallée,
  - Culinary Design, under supervision of University of Cergy-Pontoise
  - Stage Design and Events Design, under supervision of University of Paris III: Sorbonne Nouvelle
- Preparatory Class for the "Grandes Écoles" of Design (CPGE)

== Notable alumni ==
- Léo Quievreux (born 1971), comic book author and illustrator
- Pierre Hardy
- Julien Dossena
- Guillaume Henry
- Alexandre Mattiussi
- Christine Phung
