= Pierre Hardy (fashion designer) =

French fashion designer (born 1956)

- Born: 1 February 1956 (age 70); Paris, France
- Occupation: Fashion designer

Pierre Hardy (born 1 February 1956) is a French fashion designer who specializes in luxury footwear. Hardy is known for designing high-end women's shoes and men's sneakers.

== Early life and education ==
Hardy was born in Paris. His mother was a ballet instructor and his father taught athletics. He pursued a teaching degree in plastic arts and taught at art schools, includings at his alma mater École Duperré in Paris. After graduation, he joined a modern dance troupe and drew illustrations for European fashion magazines such as Vanity Fair Italia and Vogue Hommes.

== Career in design ==
In 1987, Hardy took a position styling shoes at Christian Dior.

From 1990 until 1999, Hardy worked under Claude Brouet at Hermès, where he was responsible for men's and women's shoes. At Hermès, he created classics that include the Oran sandal in 1997. For the spring/summer 1998 collection, he developed the Quick trainer, making Hermès the first luxury brand to design a trainer made entirely of leather. In 2001, Hermès added jewelry to his responsibilities.

In 1999, Hardy launched his eponymous brand, Pierre Hardy. Within a year, he sold 5,000 pairs to stores like Neiman Marcus and Barneys New York. Today the brand sells luxury shoe and fashion accessories for men and women. In 2016, he sold a minority stake of his company to Hermès.

From 2001, Hardy also oversaw women's shoes for Balenciaga, under the leadership of Nicolas Ghesquière. He left Balenciaga when Ghesquière did, in 2012. He also collaborated with the Gap Inc. in 2011, and with the makeup brand NARS Cosmetics in 2013.

== Recognition ==
In 2016, Hardy was awarded with the Chevalier of the Legion of Honour.

== Personal life ==
Hardy was in a seven-year relationship with Nicolas Ghesquière. He is married to Christopher Turnier.

== Stores ==
Country	Number of stores	Cities	Location
France	1	Paris (1)	156, Galerie de Valois 75001 Paris
United States of America	1	New York City (1)	30, Jane Street 10014 New York
Japan	1	Tokyo (1)	Minami Aoyama Yusen Building A-103 5-5-25 Minami-Aoyama, Minato-ku
