= Christophe Lemaire (fashion designer) =

French fashion designer

- Born: April 1965 (age 61); Besançon, France
- Known for: Eponymous label, designer at Hermès, Lacoste, Uniqlo
- Website: https://www.lemaire.fr

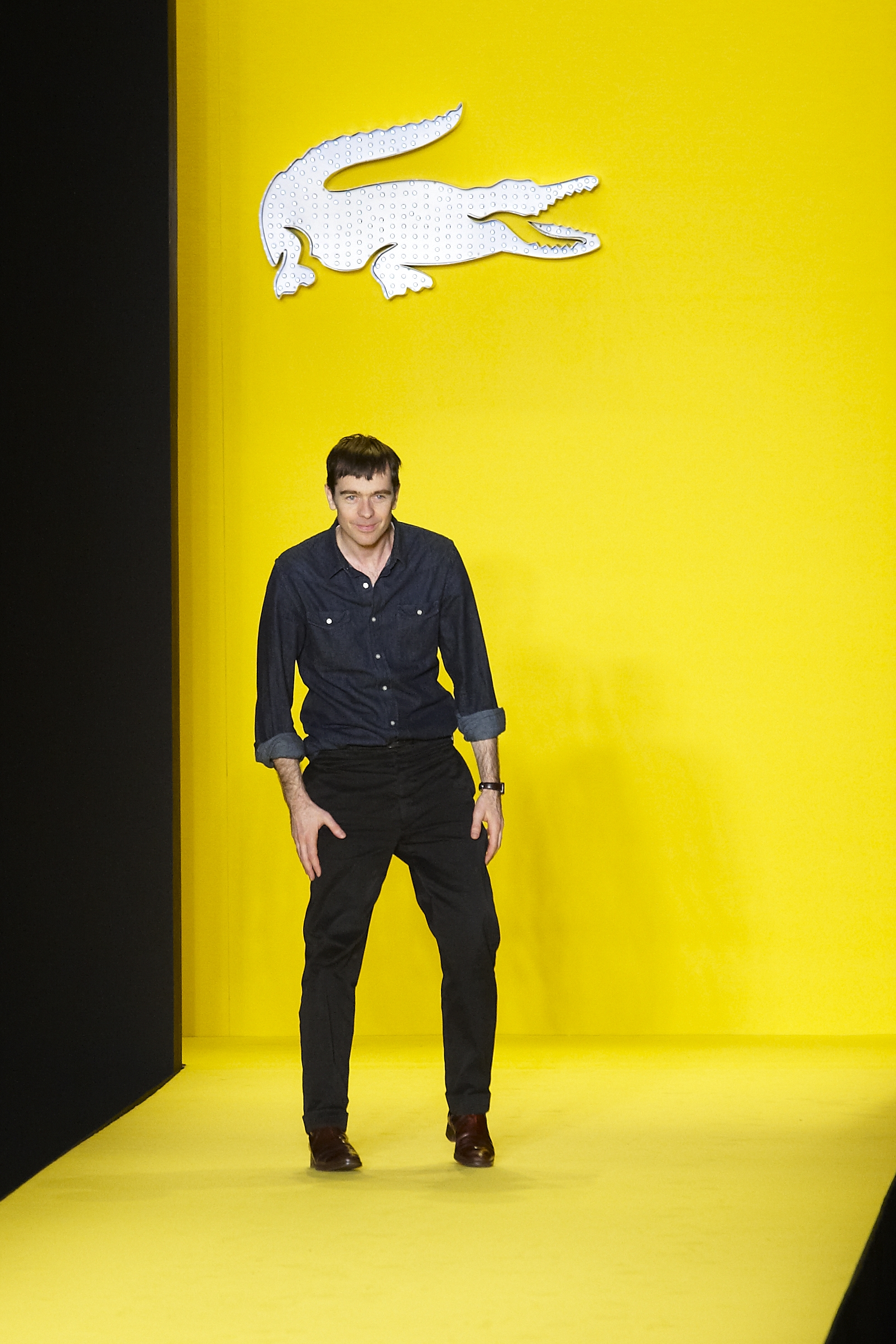
Christopher Lemaire at New York Fashion Week in 2010

Christophe Lemaire (born April 1965) is a French fashion designer, founder of eponymous label Lemaire, and former creative director at Hermès and Lacoste. He is noted for his simple, elegant design style, as well as his collaborations with brands such as Japanese retailer Uniqlo.

== Early life ==
Lemaire was born in the town of Besançon in France. He described his upbringing as that of a "typical French bourgeois family," travelling between Senegal and France and attending boarding school. His parents are divorced. His uncle is Robert Caillé, publisher of Vogue France. At seventeen, he dated fellow future designer Isabel Marant, the two designing clothes and selling them to stores on consignment. He credits the work of Japanese designers Yohji Yamamoto and Rei Kawakubo for sparking his interest in fashion.

== Career ==
Lemaire entered the fashion world working as an assistant stylist at Thierry Mugler. He later went on to work for Yves Saint Laurent and Christian Lacroix. He described feeling left out of the fashion world because he wasn't gay and was not interested in fashion shows, preferring street style.

Based on a desire to create something in the middle of haute couture and mass-market fashion, Lemaire launched his eponymous label in 1991 with a collection of womenswear, introducing menswear in 1995. Lemaire won the ANDAM fashion award in 1992.

In 2000, Lemaire's personal brand went on a hiatus, with Lemaire joining Lacoste as their artistic director in 2001. Lemaire first became recognized in the industry during his stint at Lacoste. He introduced elements of street fashion into the brand, which reinvented its preppy image from the 80s.

After a decade at Lacoste, Lemaire moved to a position as creative director at Hermès womenswear in 2010. The move was a surprise for the industry, as the relatively inexperienced Lemaire was replacing the renowned Jean-Paul Gaultier. During his tenure at Hermès, he brought his signature minimalism to the brand. He remained with Hermès for four years before stepping down to revive his own label, this time with partner Sarah Linh-Tran.

=== Personal label ===
Lemaire launched his label, named simply "Lemaire," in 1991, until going on hiatus to join Lacoste as artistic director. After bringing the brand back in 2014 with partner Sarah Linh-Tran, Lemaire quickly grew. The company reached 7 million euros in profit in 2015, attracting funding from investment firm Bpifrance. In March 2015, he announced a collaboration with Japanese fast fashion retailer Uniqlo, which developed into his own line at Uniqlo dubbed Uniqlo U. Uniqlo U is based out of the Uniqlo Paris R&D Centre, which Lemaire helms as artistic director. Revenues of the brand reached 14 million USD by 2018, and the retail holding company Fast Retailing (parent company of Uniqlo) acquired a minority stake in the brand in 2018. As of November 2024, the brand operates stores in Paris, Milan, Chengdu, Tokyo, and Seoul.

== Design style ==
Lemaire is noted for his practical, minimalist designs that resist trends, emphasizing clothes practical for daily wear rather than "a spectacular point of view." He is heavily inspired by Japanese fashion and culture, beginning with his first visit to the country in 1995.
