= Thierry Hermès =

French businessman (1801–1878)

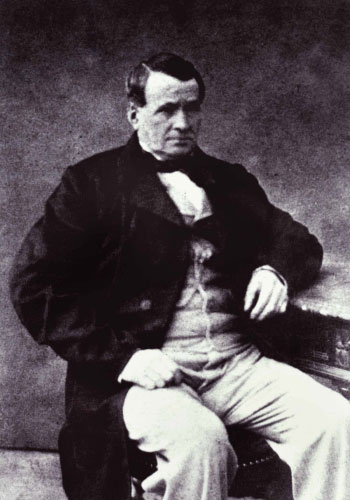
- Born: 10 January 1801; Crefeld, Roer Department, French First Republic
- Died: 10 January 1878 (aged 77); Neuilly-sur-Seine, French Third Republic
- Citizenship: French
- Occupations: Saddler and harness maker
- Known for: Founding Hermès; Patriarch of the Hermès family
- Spouse: Christine Pétronille Piérart (m. 1828)
- Children: 1

Thierry Hermès (pronounced [tjɛʁi ɛʁmɛs]; 10 January 1801 – 10 January 1878) was a French fashion designer. The business that he founded was developed by his descendants and evolved into the luxury goods company known as Hermès.

As a young adult, he moved to Normandy and learned the trade of harness saddler. In 1837, he moved to Paris and opened a workshop specializing in the creation of harnesses for horses, a field in which he gained recognition at the 1867 Universal Exhibition. By the time of his death in 1878, his company was already recognized for its excellence in luxury saddlery.

His descendants played a crucial role in the development of the company, as he was succeeded by his only son, Charles-Émile, and his grandson Émile-Maurice Hermès. Later, Émile-Maurice's sons-in-law, notably Robert Dumas, contributed significantly to the company's expansion. Since 2013, the company has been headed by Axel Dumas, a member of the family's sixth generation.

== Early life ==
Thierry Hermès was born on 10 January 1801 in the city of Crefeld in modern-day Germany, which was at that time part of the Roer department of the French First Republic as a result of the Revolutionary Wars; he was thus born a French citizen. He was the sixth child of a Protestant innkeeper and a mother of Rhineland origin, Agnese Kuhnen.

After the death of his parents in 1821, he settled for a few years at Pont-Audemer in Normandy, a town renowned for working hides. There, he entered as an apprentice to a saddler and harness maker (French: sellier harnacheur).

On 17 April 1828, he married Christine Pétronille Piérart (1805 – 30 April 1896). They had one son named Charles-Émile.

== Career ==
Having become a master craftsman, Thierry Hermès moved to Paris in 1837, where he opened his first workshop at 56 rue Basse-du-Rempart (now defunct), near the Madeleine church. It was originally a horse harness factory, the founding trade of the Hermès company. The idea to create this manufacture had come to him during a previous trip to Paris, after observing that the movements of horses used for transport purposes were hampered by poorly sized harnesses. Thierry Hermès developed harnesses that were sturdy, comfortable and streamlined, and he won awards at the 1867 Universal Exhibition.

He built his business on the strength of a stitch that could only be done by hand. The saddle stitch consisted of two needles working two waxed linen threads in tensile opposition. The quality and beauty of Hermès bridles and harnesses were unrivaled for the Parisian beau monde who relied on equipage for travel. Among the clients were the Emperor of the French himself – Napoleon III – and his spouse, Eugénie de Montijo. The business that was established would, under his successors in the generations that followed, evolve from harnesses and saddles to the trunks, handbags, zippers and other items which the Hermès brand is now reputed for.

Thierry Hermès died at Neuilly-sur-Seine in 1878. That year, the house distinguished itself at the Universal Exhibition with a gold medal, second in the ranking out of seven awards. His son, Charles-Émile Hermès, then took over management of the company and extended its activities to saddlery. He also moved the store to 24 rue du Faubourg Saint-Honoré, which meant that the store was now in proximity to wealthy clients.

== Posterity ==
Charles-Émile Hermès had two sons of his own, Adolphe and Émile-Maurice, who were involved in the family business building elite clientele in Europe, America, North Africa and Asia. Adolphe left Émile-Maurice with the business, as he believed that the company had a limited future in the era of horseless carriages. Émile-Maurice then took control in 1919 and, three years later, bought out his brother's shares. He noticed the demand for saddlery, leading him to steer Hermès towards the making of "saddle-stitched" leather goods and trunks for the customers who traveled by car, train or ship. He expanded the company, launching the leather goods and baggage lines.

After realizing the company was entering the age of automobiles, Émile-Maurice acquired a two-year patent for the zipper, which was known as the "Hermès Fastener". Once the zipper was introduced, clothing was transformed. Other entrepreneurs such as Coco Chanel wanted to learn from Hermès due to its rapid growth and popularity.

Émile-Maurice Hermès and his wife Julie Hollande had only daughters – Yvonne (born 1902), who married Francis Puech; Jacqueline (born 1903), who married Robert Dumas; and Aline (born 1907), who married Jean René Guerrand. Émile-Maurice joined forces with his three sons-in-law, who contributed to a large number of descendants. The 1930s saw the sons-in-law play a major creative role in the development of Hermès, contributing their creativity. Robert Dumas was notably the creator of carrés de soie and the Kelly bag, while Jean-René Guerrand moved into fragrances in 1951 with Eau d'Hermès and Calèche.

Robert Dumas finally succeeded Émile-Maurice Hermès upon his death in 1951. In 1978, Jean-Louis Dumas, son of Robert, took over the reins of the company, considerably increasing its sales. In 1993, the company went public, but the ownership of 80% of the shares remained with Hermès family members. Today, the House of Hermès is run by Axel Dumas, nephew of Jean-Louis and member of the sixth generation of the Hermès family, who became CEO in 2013. Many family members hold management positions in the company, such as Pierre-Alexis Dumas, who is the artistic director, and Guillaume de Seynes, managing director of the upstream division and holdings.

== Legacy ==
Hermès made many innovations, which are still well known to this day. The Hermès zipper created in 1923 is still used in many bags. The silk that Hermès used for jockeys' blouses became the first Hermès silk scarf, Jeu des Omnibus et Dames blanches, in 1923. Around the 1930s, Hermès launched several items that became classics, including the large crocodile handbag known later as the Kelly bag (named for Grace Kelly). The company later developed men's neckties, watches, and new scarf designs. One of the most famous classics, the Birkin bag (named after actress Jane Birkin), was created by Jean-Louis Dumas in 1984. Today, Hermès has about 300 stores worldwide.
