= Hermès =

French luxury goods manufacturer

Hermès International S.C.A.

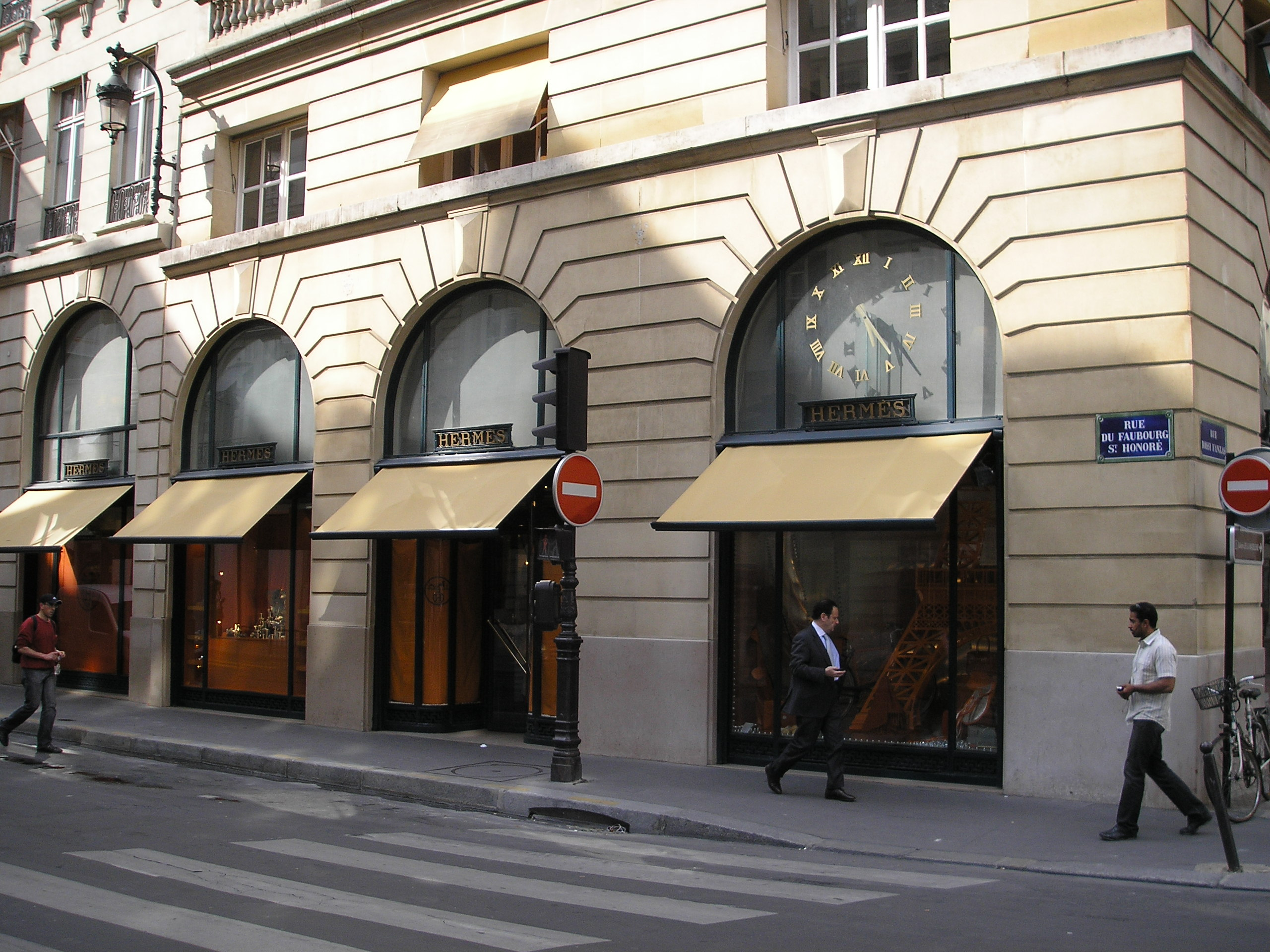
- Flagship store in Rue du Faubourg-Saint-Honoré in Paris, France
- Type: Public (Société en commandite par actions)
- Traded as: Euronext Paris: RMS; CAC 40 component
- Industry: Luxury goods
- Founded: 1837; 189 years ago in Paris, France
- Founder: Thierry Hermès
- Headquarters: 24 Rue du Faubourg Saint-Honoré; Paris, France; 48°52′08″N 02°19′18″E
- Key people: Axel Dumas (Executive Chairman), Henri-Louis Bauer (Executive Manager and Chairman, Emile Hermès SARL), Éric de Seynes (Chairman, Supervisory Board), Pierre-Alexis Dumas (Artistic Executive Vice President)
- Products: Clothing and accessories
- Revenue: ▲€16.00 billion (2025)
- Operating income: ▲€6.56 billion (2025)
- Net income: ▼€4.52 billion (2025)
- Total assets: ▲€24.32 billion (2025)
- Total equity: ▲€18.84 billion (2025)
- Owners: Hermès family and others (see shareholder structure)
- Number of employees: 26,494 (2025)
- Website: hermes.com

Hermès International S.C.A. (/ɛərˈmɛz/ air-MEHZ, French: [ɛʁmɛs]), using the trade name Hermès Paris or simply Hermès, is a French luxury goods company that was founded in 1837 by Thierry Hermès in Paris, France. At that time, it specialized in the saddlery and harness making trade, producing equipment for horse riders and their horses. The company then branched out into trades including leather goods (which is now its core business), followed by silk, ready-to-wear, watchmaking, jewellery, fashion accessories and perfumery. In 2020, the beauty division added a sixteenth business line.

Hermès is still controlled by descendants of the founder, Thierry Hermès. The Hermès family is divided into three branches – the Dumas, Guerrand and Puech cousins – united within the H51 holding company. Except for the period from 2003 to 2013, during which Patrick Thomas was CEO, the company has always been run by a descendant of the founder. Today, it employs around 26,500 people, and near 16,500 employees in France, where it has 63 manufactures and production sites. In 2025, Hermès generated sales of 16 billion euros, with a net income of 4.5 billion euros.

== History ==
=== Beginnings in the 19th century ===
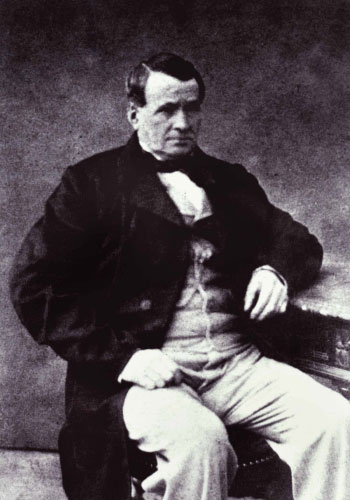
Thierry Hermès, founder of Hermès

Thierry Hermès was born on 10 January 1801 in Krefeld (in what is now Germany) to a French father and a German mother. He settled in 1829 in Pont-Audemer, Normandy, a town known for working hides, where he was employed as an apprentice to a saddler and harness maker. Having become a master craftsman, he returned to Paris in 1837, where he opened his first workshop near the church of La Madeleine. He designed, made and sold high-quality harnesses and other equipment for horses. Hermès won several awards, including a first-class medal at the 1867 Exposition Universelle, which gave him access to a prestigious clientele, including world leaders such as Tsar Nicholas II. He died in Neuilly-sur-Seine in 1878.

In 1880, Charles-Émile Hermès, Thierry's son, took over the direction of the company. He moved it to 24 rue du Faubourg-Saint-Honoré, where Hermès International is still headquartered. In 1889, assisted by his two sons, Adolphe and Émile-Maurice, he added other products for riders, such as horse blankets and silk helmets. They succeeded their father in 1902, creating Hermès Frères. Shortly after, Émile-Maurice began furnishing the emperor of Russia with saddles. Émile-Maurice also created the Haut à Courroies bag for horsemen to carry their saddle and boots.

During World War I, Émile-Maurice traveled to the United States. The country was booming, and transportation, particularly the automobile, was progressing. On his return, he and his brother applied their saddlery expertise, including saddle stitch sewing, to the expanding luggage market. He also returned from this trip with the zipper technology, which he introduced to leather goods and fashion. Subsequently, Émile-Maurice was granted the exclusive rights to use the zipper for leather goods and clothing. In 1918, Hermès introduced the first leather golf jacket with a zipper, made for Edward, Prince of Wales. The zipper became known in France as the fermeture Hermès (Hermès fastener).

=== Hermès Frères era ===
In 1919, Émile-Maurice Hermès bought out his brother and became the sole proprietor. He extended the business to travel accessories, sports, automobiles, jewellery, and fashion. In 1922, the first leather handbags were introduced after Émile-Maurice's wife complained of not being able to find one to her liking. Émile-Maurice created the handbag collection himself. In the 1920s and 1930s, the designer Lola Prusac created and developed a line of clothing adapted to the emerging beach and mountain sports. Hermès fashion then appealed to an affluent clientele of all nationalities.

In the 1930s, Émile-Maurice's three sons-in-law, Robert Dumas, Jean René Guerrand, and Francis Puech, joined the company and created the ladies' bag with straps, which was revisited and christened the Kelly bag in the 1950s. Guerrand developed the perfumery business, while Dumas spearheaded the development of leather goods and silk. It was during World War II that orange, imposed by shortages and stockouts caused by the German occupation of France, became the official color of the house. At the same time, Émile-Maurice Hermès chose the drawing Duc attelé, groom à l'attente, by Alfred de Dreux to illustrate the Hermès logo.

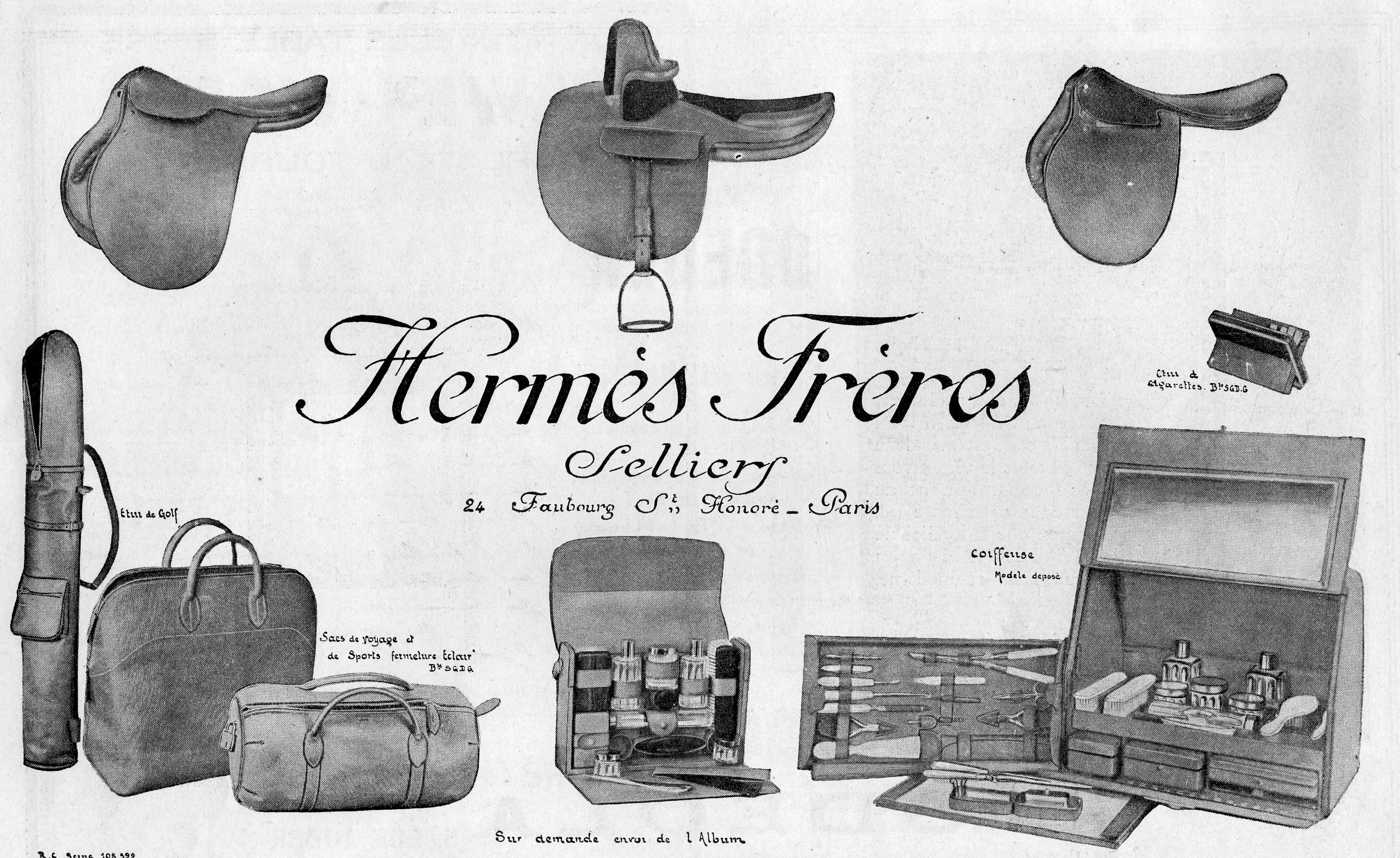
Hermès Frères advertisement, 1923

In 1924, Hermès established a presence in the United States and opened two shops outside of Paris. In 1929, the first women's couture apparel collection was previewed in Paris. During the 1930s, Hermès introduced some of its most recognized original goods such as the leather "Sac à dépêches" in 1935, and the Hermès carrés (square scarves) in 1937. The scarves became integrated into French culture. In 1938, the "Chaîne d'ancre" bracelet and the riding jacket and outfit joined the classic collection. By this point, the company's designers began to draw inspirations from paintings, books, and objets d'art. The 1930s also witnessed Hermès's entry into the United States market by offering products in a Neiman Marcus department store in New York; however, it later withdrew. In 1949, the same year as the launch of the Hermès silk tie, the first perfume, "Eau d'Hermès", was produced.

From the mid-1930s, Hermès employed the Swiss watchmaker Universal Genève as the brand's designer of timepieces, producing a line of men's wrist chronographs (manufactured in 18K gold or stainless steel) and women's Art Déco cuff watches in 18K gold, steel, or platinum. Both models contained dials signed either "Hermès" or "Hermès Universal Genève", while the watch movements were signed "Universal Genève S.A". The Hermès/Universal partnership lasted until the 1950s.

Émile-Maurice summarized the Hermès philosophy during his leadership as "leather, sport, and a tradition of refined elegance."

=== Post-Émile-Maurice Hermès ===
Robert Dumas took over as head of Hermès on the death of his father-in-law in 1951, while closely collaborating with his brother-in-law Jean-René Guerrand. He introduced original handbags, jewelry, and accessories, and was particularly interested in design possibilities with the silk scarves. During the mid-20th century, scarf production diminished.

A few years after the 1947 creation of Comptoir Nouveau de la Parfumerie, launched on the initiative of Jean-René Guerrand, the house's first perfumes were produced in France, such as the perfume Calèche in 1961. Eau d'Hermès, created by Edmond Roudnitska in 1951, harked back to the company's origins, its fragrance recalling that of leather.

In the 1950s, the Kelly bag, then simply called a lady's small strap bag, found its name when a photograph of Grace Kelly, the new princess of Monaco wearing the bag, was published in Life magazine and went around the world. The late 1960s saw the appearance of the first women's ready-to-wear lines, designed by Catherine de Károlyi. The company made its international debut, opening stores in Europe, Asia, and the United States.

=== Expansion under Jean-Louis Dumas ===
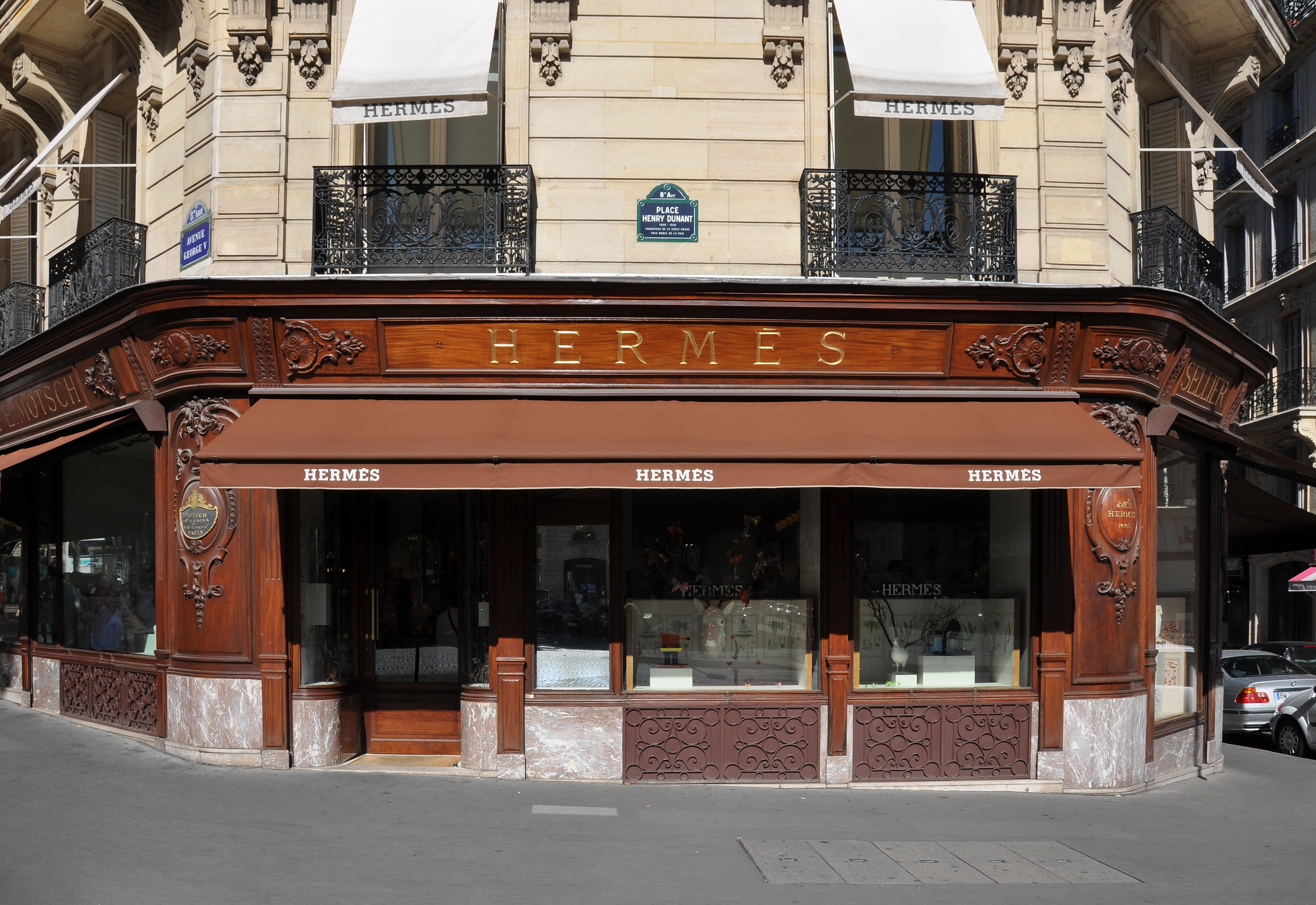
Hermes store at Avenue George V in Paris 8th arrondissement, France

Jean-Louis Dumas, the son of Robert Dumas-Hermès, joined the family firm in 1964. He took over in 1978 and developed new businesses within Hermès. He created the watchmaking subsidiary La Montre Hermès, in Bienne, Switzerland, and acquired the English John Lobb Bootmaker, glass manufacturer Saint-Louis and goldsmith Puiforcat. From the 1980s, tableware became a strong segment of the firm. And, overall, the collection of Hermès goods expanded in 1990 to include over 30,000 pieces. New materials used in the collection included porcelain and crystal.

The first advertising campaign, featuring a young girl in jeans wearing a silk square, marked the desire to appeal to a new clientele and broke with the house's traditional codes. In 1984, a discussion with his neighbor during a flight from Paris to London, Jane Birkin, led him to design the Birkin Bag. The Birkin Bag, or simply "Birkin," was inspired by how Jane Birkin would carry her items in a large, woven basket. Jean-Louis Dumas also recruited new talent such as designer Martin Margiela to modernize the ready-to-wear collections. Hermès then relocated its workshops and design studios to Pantin, just outside Paris.

=== Growth ===
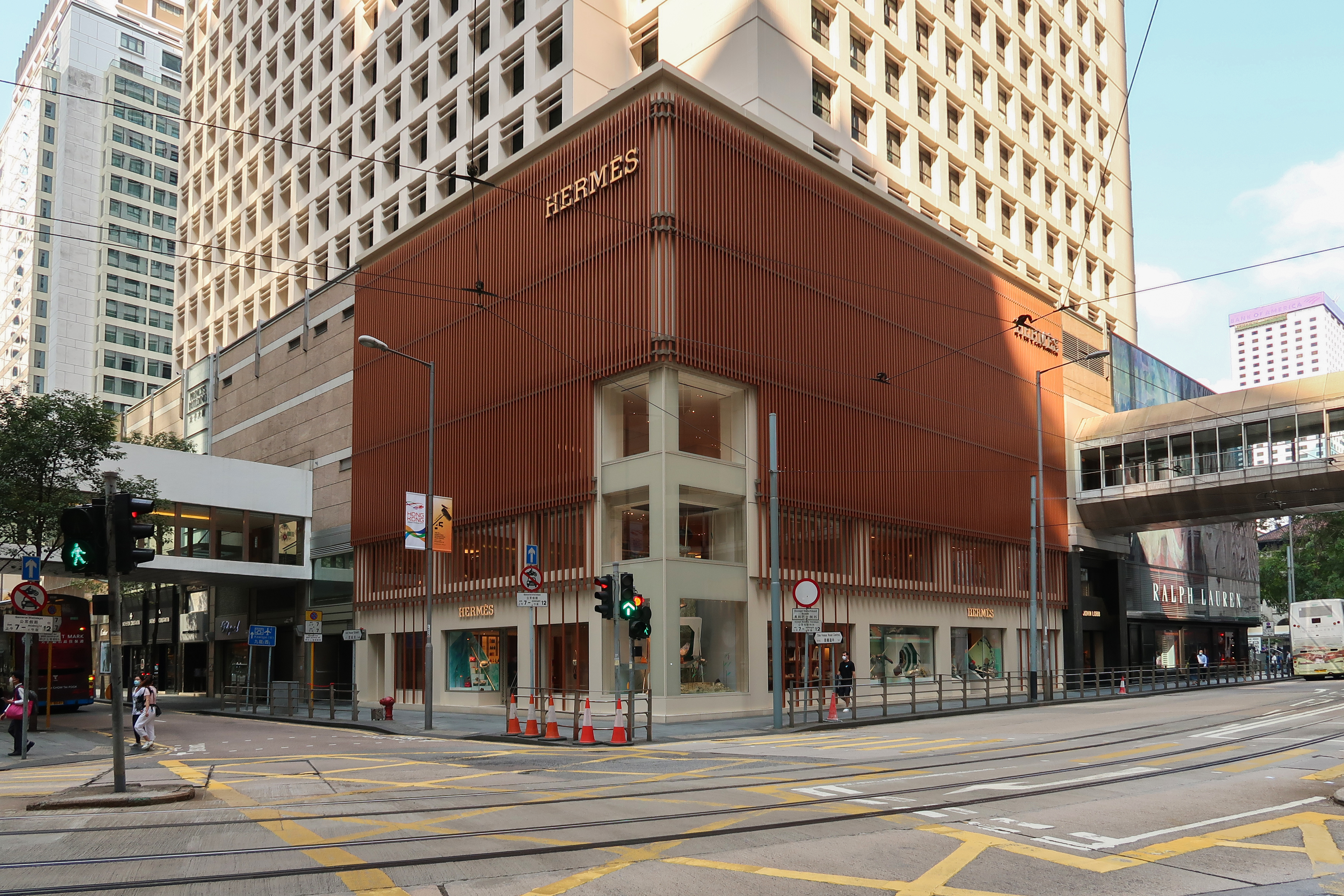
Hermès flagship store in Prince's Building, Hong Kong

In 1989, Hermès became a limited partnership, before being listed on the Stock Exchange four years later. At the time, the equity sale generated great excitement. The 425,000 shares floated at FFr 300 (US$55 at the time) were oversubscribed by 34 times. Dumas told Forbes magazine that the equity sale would help lessen family tensions by allowing some members to liquidate their holdings without "squabbling over share valuations among themselves." To this time, the Hermès family was still retaining a strong hold of about 80% in stocks, placing Jean-Louis Dumas and the entire family on the Forbes list of billionaires. Mimi Tompkins of U.S. News & World Report called the company "one of Paris' best guarded jewels."

In the following years, Dumas decreased Hermès' franchises from 250 to 200 and increased company-owned stores from 60 to 100 to better control sales of its products. The plan was to cost about FFr 200 million in the short term but to increase profits in the long term. Having around FFr 500 million to invest, Hermès pressed ahead, targeting China for company-operated boutiques, finally opening a store in The Peninsula Beijing in 1997. By the late 1990s, Hermès continued to diminish the number of franchised stores, buying them up and opening more company-operated boutiques. The fashion industry was caught off guard in September 1999, when Jean-Louis decided to pay FFr 150 million for a 35% stake in the Jean-Paul Gaultier fashion house.

=== The 2000s ===
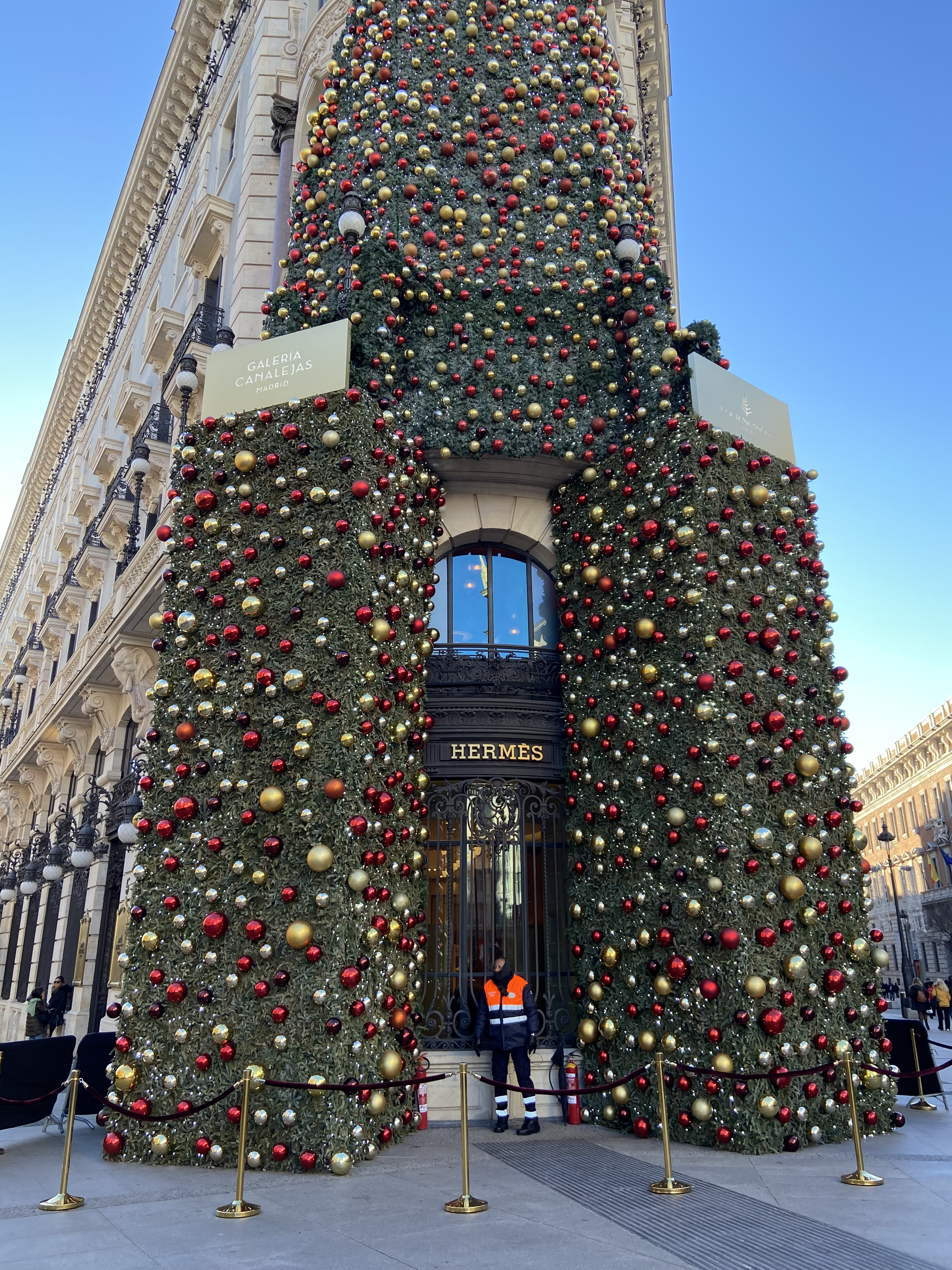
Christmas decorations at one of the Hermès stores in Madrid, Spain

Hermès acquired a 35% stake in Jean Paul Gaultier in 1999. In 2004, Jean-Paul Gaultier was appointed head of women's ready-to-wear, succeeding Martin Margiela. He remained there for seven years and Hermès eventually sold its shares to the Spanish group Puig. Also in 2004, Jean-Claude Ellena became the in-house perfumer or "nose" and has created several successful scents, including the Hermessence line of fragrances. This was followed by the acquisition of several plants to secure supplies of raw materials, but also tanneries, including Tannerie d'Annonay, bought out from its employees in 2013 and Tanneries du Puy-en-Velay, bought out from shoemaker J. M. Weston in 2015. From the 2010s, Hermès also stepped up the number of factories it opened in France, particularly for leather goods. This was done to meet growing demand for products that each require many hours of work, but also to maintain a high level of quality by taking advantage of French craftsmanship.

Jean-Louis Dumas retired from the group for health reasons in 2006 and appointed Patrick Thomas, with whom he had managed the company in tandem since 2004, as head of Hermès International. Thomas became the first Hermès executive from outside the founder's family. Pierre-Alexis Dumas, son of Jean-Louis Dumas, became artistic director of Hermès. In thirty years, Hermès sales will have risen from 42 million in 1978 to 1.9 billion euros in 2009. Jean-Louis Dumas died in Paris on 1 May 2010 at the age of 72.

On 23 October 2010, the LVMH group took a stake in Hermès to around 17.1%, with no official desire to take control. A financial battle ensued, with the heirs of the Hermès family suspecting Bernard Arnault, LVMH's majority shareholder, of wanting to take total control of the family business. Hermès management then clarified that its status as a management limited partnership protected it from any hostile financial operations, such as a takeover.

A new holding company, named "H51", made up of 52 of the main shareholder heirs and holding 50.2% of Hermès capital, was created in 2011 to counter the LVMH group. Julie Guerrand, from the 6th generation, took the helm. This new entity requires each person with at least 0.5% of the capital to declare his or her name, as the company's management wants to know now who owns what. At the end of 2014, the confrontations between LVMH and Hermès came to an end with an agreement signed between the two groups. The majority of Hermès shares acquired by LVMH were redistributed to its own shareholders, including the holding company of Bernard Arnault. At the end of December 2016, the descendants of Thierry Hermès collectively owned 65.1% of the share capital of Hermès International S.A. In 2017, Arnault announced the sale of his remaining shares in Hermès.

=== The Axel Dumas era ===
In 2012, the company posted sales of 3.5 billion euros. That year, sales were divided between five zones: 16% for France, 17% for America, 20% for Europe (excluding France), 12% for Japan, and 33% for Asia, excluding Japan. In 2013, Axel Dumas, a member of the 6th generation of Thierry Hermès descendants, was appointed managing director of Hermès International, replacing Patrick Thomas. He had been successively France sales director, then managing director of the jewelry and leather goods-saddlery divisions before becoming managing director of the group operations in 2011. Under his leadership, the decision was taken to expand the company's production and distribution capacities. Hermès announced an increase in its turnover of 9.7 percent, representing more than €4 billion in sales. In March 2018, Hermès opened a multi-story shop at the Dubai Mall. In 2019, the brand was ranked 33rd in the Forbes List "World's Most Valuable Brands". The company officially joined the CAC 40 in June 2018, with 57 billion euros in market capitalization. compared with 600 million euros when it went public in 1993.

Against the backdrop of the COVID-19 pandemic, the group saw sales fall by 7% and net income by 9% in 2020. Nevertheless, it resumed a sustained pace of growth the following year, and announced a net income of 2.445 billion euros on sales of 9 billion euros, higher figures than before the pandemic. The 2021 review of WIPO's annual World Intellectual Property Indicators ranked Hermès 7th in the world for the 68 industrial design registrations that were published under the Hague System during 2020. This position is significantly up on their previous 15th-place ranking for their 27 industrial design registrations published in 2019. In 2021, the group reported a net profit of €2.445 billion and €9 billion in sales, achieving an operating margin of 39.3%. These results surpassed pre-pandemic figures. Hermès also entered the EURO STOXX 50.

In March 2022, after the beginning of the Russo-Ukrainian War, Hermès announced the suspension of its activities in Russia. About 60 employees were affected across three stores. In 2024, Hermès' net profit reached €4.6 billion, with a 40.5% operating margin. Sales growth spanned all regions, totaling €15.2 billion. Analysts suggest this resilience is due to Hermès impeccable brand image, storytelling, and positioning, as well as citing the broader consumer interest in "quiet luxury". Hermès presented "Hermès in the Making," a traveling exhibition across France, showcasing its artisanal craftsmanship. Also in 2023, the company won a copyright lawsuit against American artist Mason Rothschild, who replicated and sold the Birkin bag as an NFT collection. In the same year, the group announced four new production sites in France: Espagnac, Loupes, Riom, and Charleville-Mézières.

In 2025, the group's revenue reached 16 billion euros, with a net profit of 5 billion euros.

In October 2025, British designer Grace Wales Bonner was announced as Hermès' creative director of men's ready-to-wear. She is set to present her first collection for the brand in January 2027.

== Sectors ==
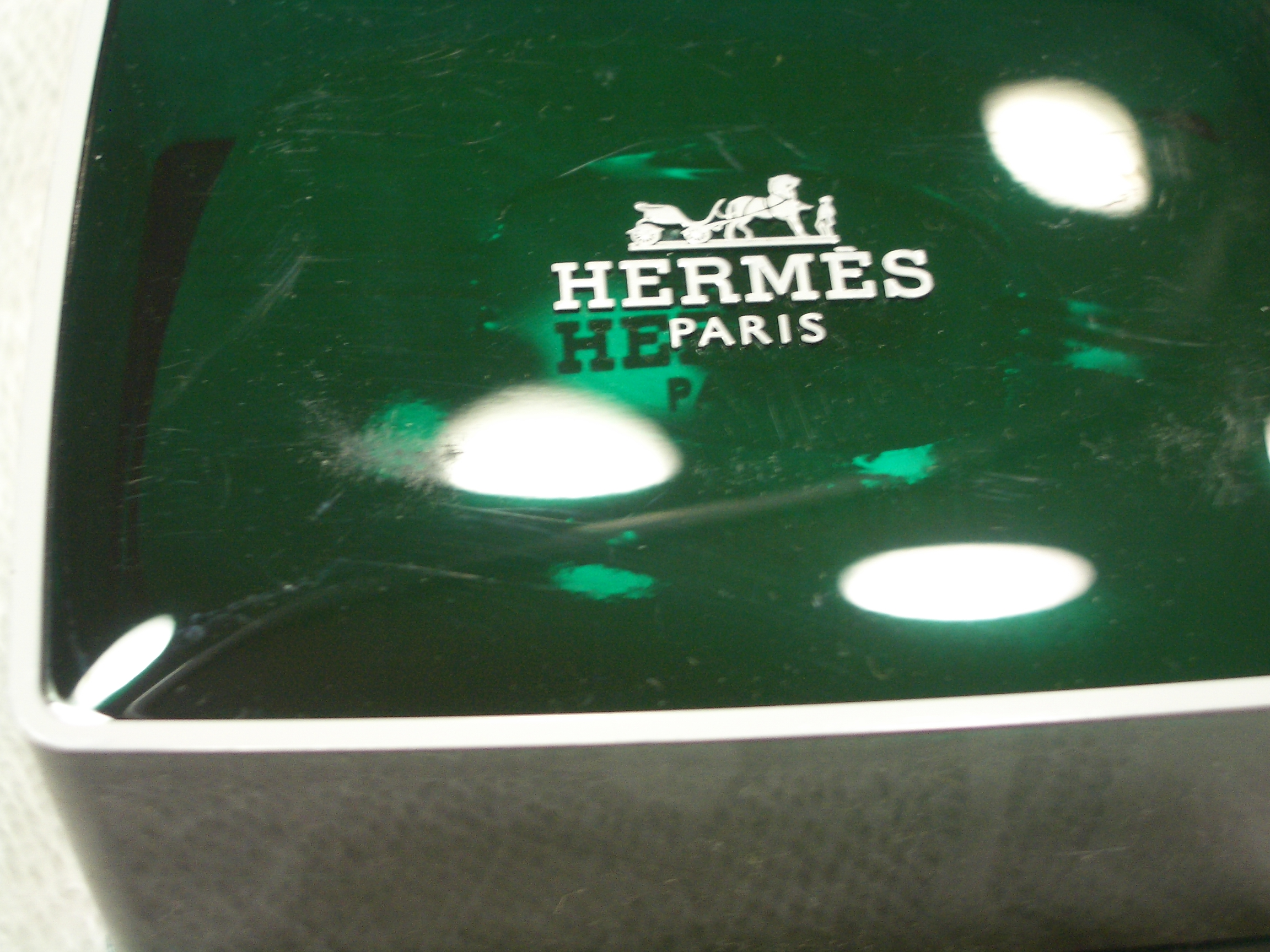
An Hermès soap bar bearing the logo

Hermès has sixteen product divisions that encompassed leather, scarves, ties, men's wear, women's wear, perfume, watches, stationery, footwear, gloves, enamelware, decorative arts, tableware, beauty, and jewellery. The company licenses no products and keeps tight control over the design and manufacture of its vast inventory. By the end of 2025, Hermès International's divisions, ranked in proportion to their contribution to sales, are distributed as follows:

- Leather goods and saddlery: 44.2%
- Clothing, footwear, and accessories: 28.3%
- Silk and textile products: 6%
- Watches: 3.4%
- Perfumes: 3.1%
- Other (jewellery, tableware, etc.): 15%

=== Saddlery and leather crafting ===
Horse tack and leather crafting are the original Hermès specialty. The Hermès leather goods-saddlery branch designs and manufactures all the company's families of leather objects. Craftsmen working in leather factories in France make riding and travel goods, women's and men's bags, and small leather goods. Each product is handcrafted using the raw materials available. This explains why it takes so long to obtain the most sought-after confections such as Kelly or Birkin bags, while Hermès is often wrongly accused of organizing shortages. There is also a department called Hermès Horizons, in which craftsmen make unique objects to order, sometimes far from its usual productions, such as boxing gloves or a wooden canoe.

A famous Hermès handbag, the "Birkin bag", was named after British actress Jane Birkin. In a chance encounter with Jean-Louis Dumas, she complained that her bag was not practical for everyday use. Consequently, he invited her to France, where they co-designed the bag in 1984. Birkin later stopped carrying her namesake bag due to her tendonitis, as the bag became too large and heavy for her to carry. According to Vogue: "Jane Birkin 'is satisfied by the measures taken by Hermès', according to the brand, following an investigation by the fashion house [that refuted] claims made by PETA that its famous Birkin bags were being 'constructed from the skins of factory-farmed and cruelly slaughtered crocodiles.' "

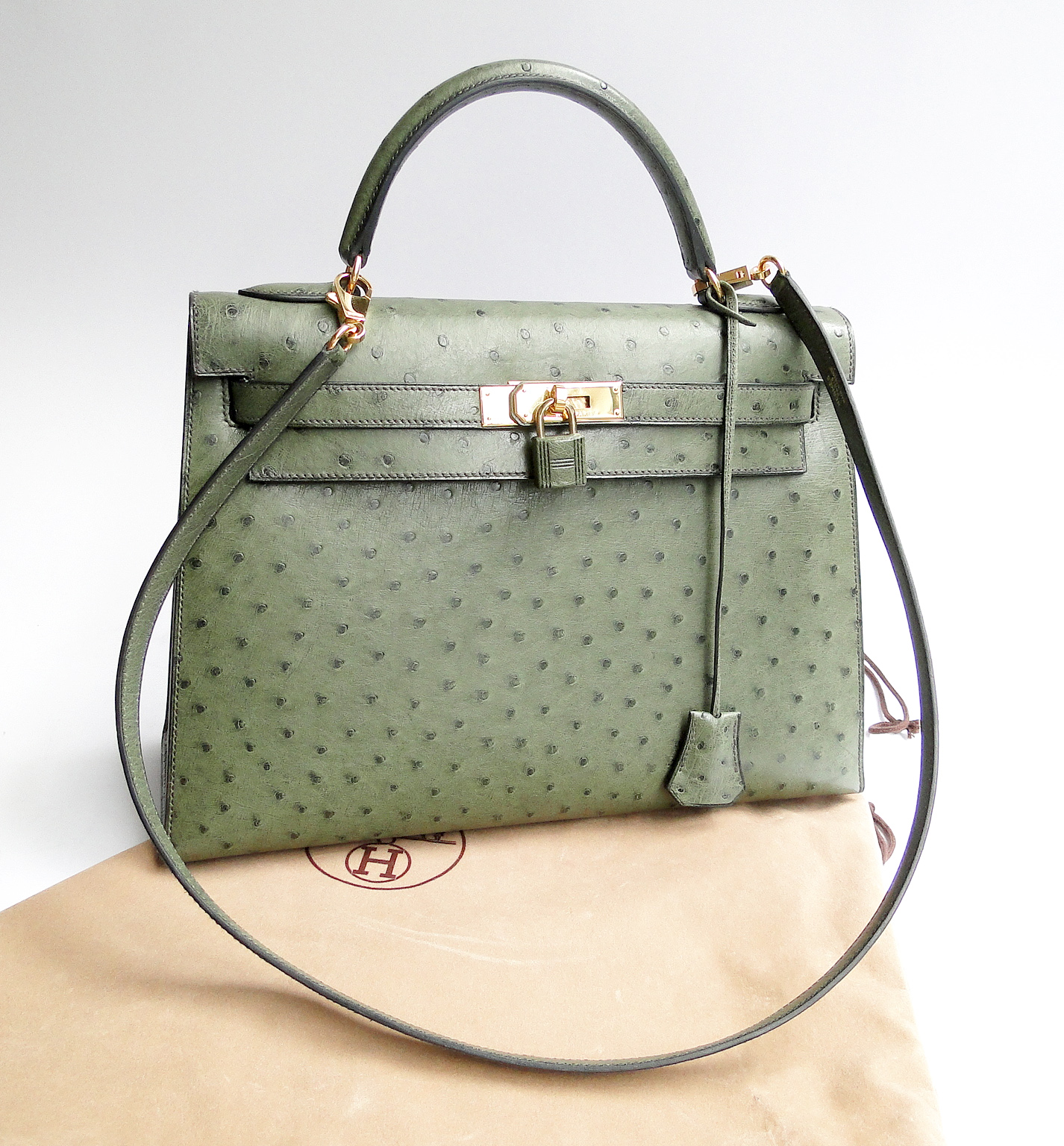
A Kelly bag

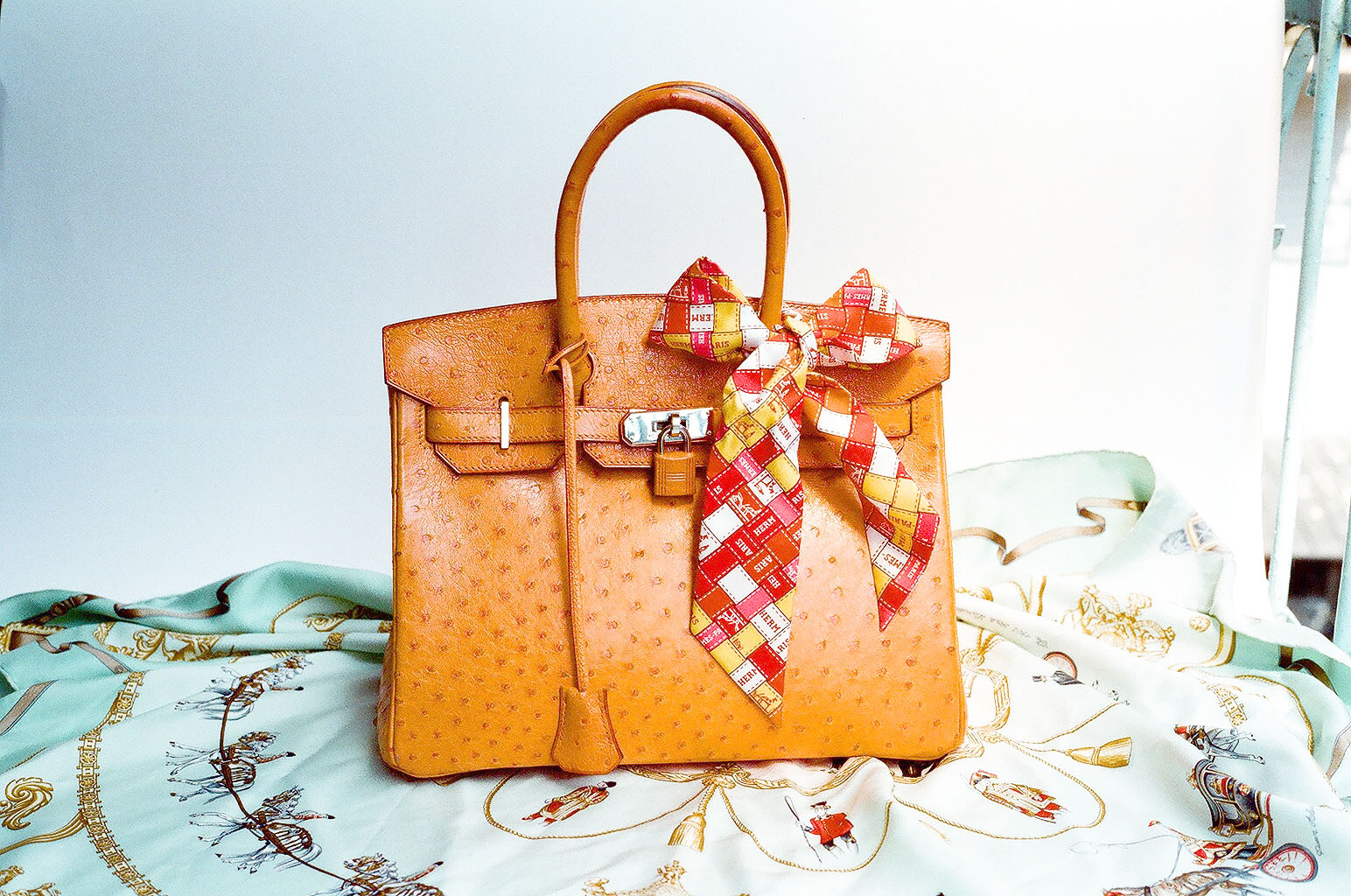
Exotic leathers of the bags make them highly valuable and noticeable, e.g., ostrich leather

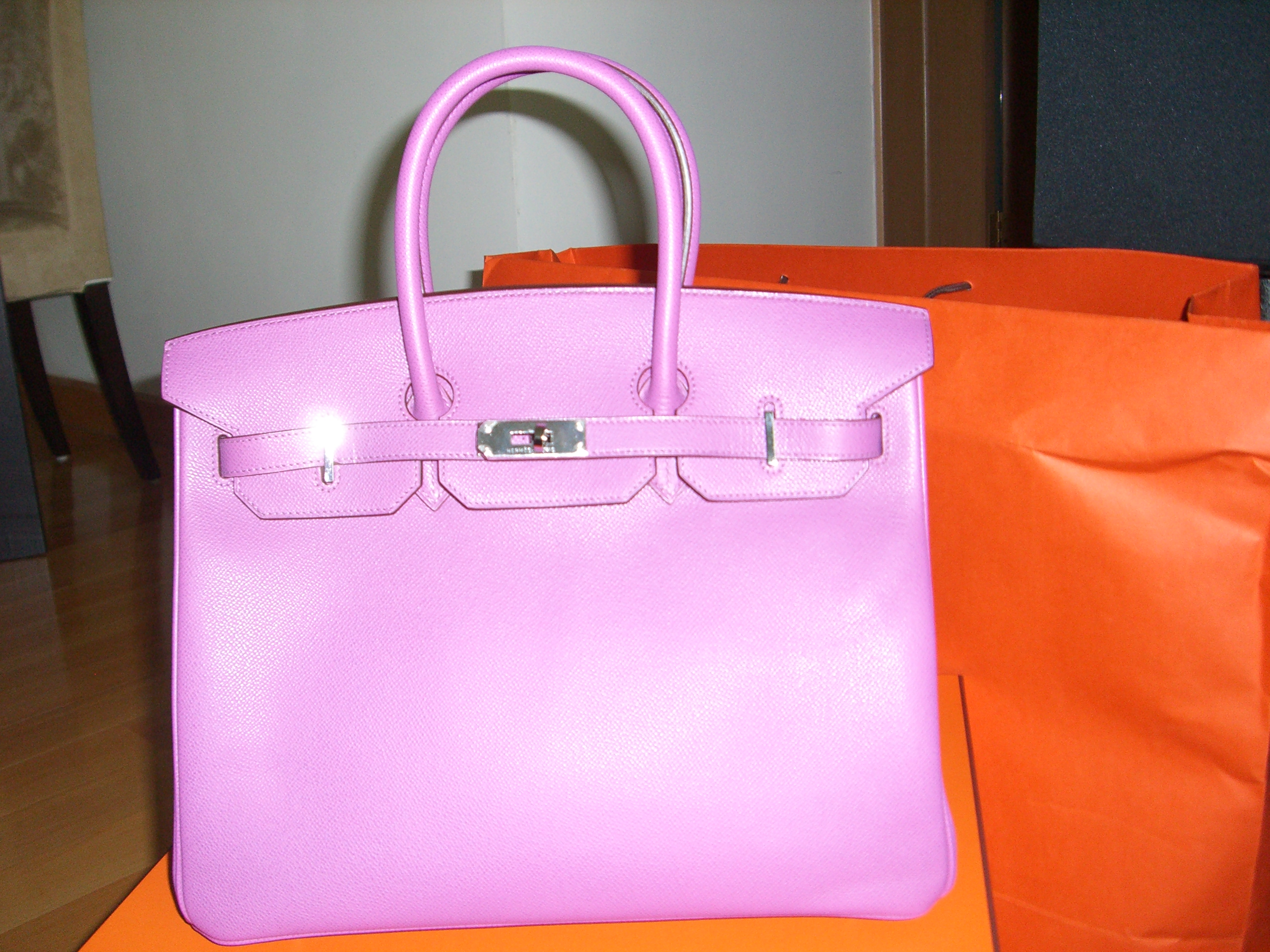
A Birkin bag

While the Kelly and Birkin are two of the house's most famous bags, Hermès has a wide range of other popular handbags. One, the bolide is a dome-shaped carry-all that comes in varying sizes with a leather shoulder strap. It is widely recognized as the first handbag that was constructed with a zipper. The bolide comes in both stiff leathers, such as Epsom, and relaxed leathers, such as Clemence. Clemence leather is sometimes referred to as Bianca leather - a particular grain that originates from France. Another popular bag from the Hermès house is the Evelyne, a comparatively affordable saddle-style bag meant to be worn cross-body with a traditional fabric strap. The evelyne is available in 4 different sizes: the TPM (16 cm), PM (29 cm), GM (33 cm)and TGM (40 cm) and is generally made in relaxed leathers like clemence. The evelyne boasts a perforated "H" motif that is meant to be hidden and worn towards the body, to allow easy access to the top of the bag. Hermès operate on a wishlist system for these items around the world as they are coveted and highly sought after.

In 2021, the Farm Transparency Project released video footage from three Australian crocodile farms owned by Hermès, which showed the small cages and concrete floors the animals live on and how they are slaughtered, including by stabbing and electrocution.

=== Clothing and accessories ===
Ready-to-wear department was born at Hermès in the 1920s-1930s, initially with sportswear, with the first menswear, a leather golf jacket, created for Duke of Windsor, Edward VIII, in 1925. Then, during the 1940s, Hermès gradually turned away from the sportswear focus to ready-to-wear, officially launched in 1967 with Catherine de Károlyi. Hermès clothing and accessories are now the group's second largest business. This department includes women and men ready-to-wear as well as fashion accessories. In addition, several renowned fashion designers have headed it, such as Lola Prusac, Martin Margiela, Jean-Paul Gaultier, or Christophe Lemaire. Today, this division is run by Nadège Vanhée and men's ready-to-wear by Véronique Nichanian. In 2027, Grace Wales Bonner became creative director of menswear ready-to-wear.

=== Silk and textiles ===
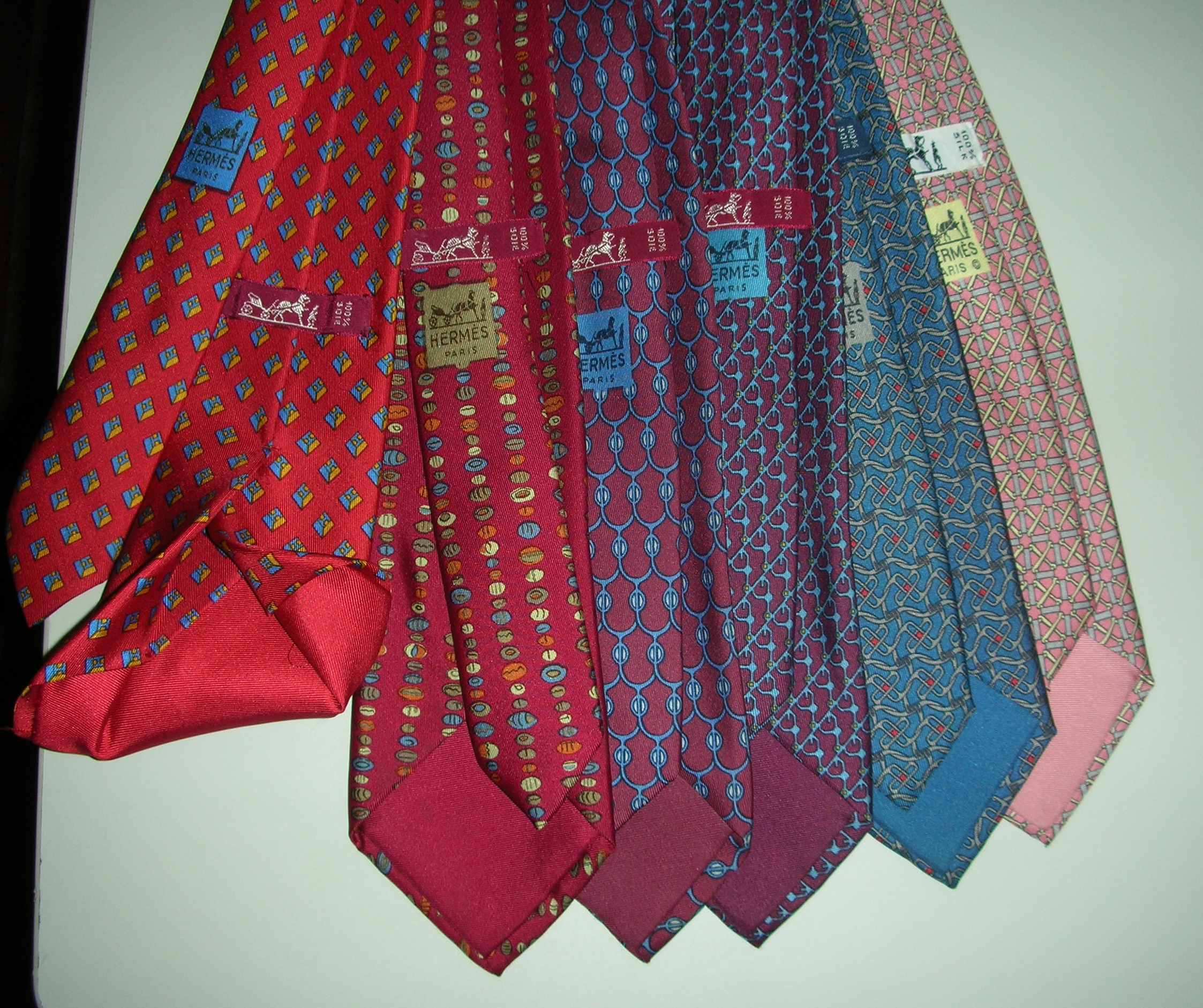
Hermès silk ties

Silk and textiles represent, in 2023, the Hermès group's fourth activity. This activity is headed by Holding Textile Hermès (HTH), located in Pierre-Bénite, a town in the metropolis of Lyon. It is structured in half a dozen subsidiaries and employs around 800 people. The first carré de soie, called "Jeu des omnibus et dames blanches" and illustrating the Parisian Madeleine-Bastille public carriage line, was created in 1937. Hermès oversaw the production of its scarves throughout the entire process, purchasing raw silk, spinning it into yarn, and weaving it into fabric twice as strong and heavy as most scarves available at the time. A variety of ranges followed: squares, ties, scarves, and shawls. Since the 1980s, Hermès has controlled the entire silk and textile production chain. In 2020, a technical innovation, kept secret by Hermès, makes it possible to print squares with different designs and colors on the front and back of the carré, double-sided.

The company's scarf designers spend years creating new print patterns that are individually screen-printed. Designers can choose from over 70,000 different colors. When production first began, a dedicated factory was established in Lyon, France, the same year that Hermès celebrated its 100th anniversary. Contemporary Hermès carrés measure 90 cm × 90 cm (35 in × 35 in), weigh 79 grams (2.8 oz), and are woven from the silk of 300 mulberry moth cocoons. All hems are hand-stitched and motifs are wide-ranging. Two collections per year are released, along with some reprints of older designs and limited editions, and two collections per year are introduced in a Cashmere/silk blend. Since 1937, Hermès has produced over 3,000 unique designs; the horse motif is particularly famous and popular. The ubiquitous "Brides de Gala" version, introduced in 1957, has been produced more than 70,000 times. A Hermès scarf is sold somewhere in the world every 25 seconds; by the late 1970s, more than 1.1 million scarves had been sold worldwide.

=== Watchmaking ===
Between 1926 and 1978, Hermès marketed timepieces through partnerships with Jaeger-LeCoultre, Patek Philippe and Rolex. It then contributed its creative skills and leather working know-how. It was under the impetus of Jean-Louis Dumas, in 1978, that the company really launched into watchmaking with the installation of a workshop in Bienne, in Switzerland. At that time, watches were almost exclusively for men, so he decided to appeal to women too, with a breakthrough design in the Arceau line, presented the same year. This line was followed by Cape Cod in 1991 with a double-turn bracelet. More recently, Hermès has introduced several watch models, including the Slim d’Hermès (2015), developed in collaboration with graphic designer Philippe Apeloig, the Galop d’Hermès (2019), designed by Ini Archibong with numerals created by type designer Vincent Sauvaire, the men's Hermès H08 line, launched in 2021, and the women's Hermès Cut model, introduced in 2024.

From the 2000s onwards, Hermès acquired stakes in several watchmaking companies, as in 2006 with a 25% stake in Vaucher manufacture for 25 million Swiss francs, already a supplier of movements for the Hermès house, with an investment of around sixteen million euros. It then acquired Natéber, a dial manufacturer, in 2012, and Joseph Erard, a watch case specialist, the following year. The first watches with in-house movements were released in 2012. In 2018, the company made its debut at the Watches and Wonders trade show.

=== Perfumes and beauty ===
Since the 1930s, Hermès has been designing perfumes on a confidential basis, via special orders tailor-made for some of its customers. Perfume truly appeared at Hermès with the creation of the Comptoir Nouveau de la Parfumerie. In 1951, the first Hermès fragrance, Eau d'Hermès, created by Edmond Roudnitska, was sold in France. The first women's fragrances, Doblis and Calèche, were launched in 1955 and 1961, respectively.

Hermès is one of the few luxury houses in France not to outsource the production of its fragrances and to have its own nez, like Jean-Claude Ellena, Hermès' exclusive perfumer from 2004 to 2016. He is the creator of several best-sellers such as Un jardin en Méditerranée, Terre d'Hermès and Hermessences. Hermès produces all its perfumes in its own workshops at Le Vaudreuil, in Normandy, which explains the small share of this division in the group's total sales. Christine Nagel joined the group in 2014 and, following his departure in 2016, succeeded him as olfactory designer.

In 2020, the group launched its sixteenth business, beauty, with a lipstick collection named Rouge Hermès and inspired by its carré de soie. Followed the brushes and nail polishes in 2021, then in 2022 the first complexion products. In 2023, Hermès launched Regard, a new collection dedicated to the eyes.

=== Other Hermès divisions ===
Among the group's other divisions is Maison d'Hermès (Hermès Home), which consists of the table services, household linens, outdoor textiles, decorations, furniture, and carpets lines. The first Hermès objects for the home were created in the 1920s. Hermès launched its first porcelain tableware line, Pivoines, in 1984.

Hermès also has a jewelry division, which has its origins in the equestrian bucklery. This craft appeared in 1927 with the first silver and leather bracelet, Filet de selle. In 1938, the Chaîne d'ancre bracelet, emblematic of the house, was created by Robert Dumas. Hermès jewellery is thought around the themes of equitation or water sports. For years, Hermès has partnered with Tuareg tribesmen for silver jewelry. The Saharan nomads' traditional motifs were often mirrored in various Hermès products, including scarves.

== Strategy and know-how ==
Hermès International's profitability is the result of a "long-term strategy aimed at enhancing the know-how and creativity of its craftsmen, while maintaining a high degree of innovation". Their strong brand identity and independence as a family business also contribute. This strategy is illustrated by the statement made by Jean-Louis Dumas in 2007: "We don't have a policy of image; we have a policy of product". Hermès considers that its best advertising is the quality of its products, which is why it has neither muses nor a marketing department.

At Hermès, the craftsman must master every stage of production; it can take up to six years for a craftsman to master some processes. Particular attention is paid to the choice of raw material: the company has a department dedicated to the purchase, tanning, and dyeing of skins. It has also invested in crocodile farms in Australia. It takes an average of two years to train a craftsman on leather and six years on precious skins. Many take up their trade by vocation, but others transfer from other careers. To this end, the company works in collaboration with France Travail.

The Group's stated aim is to maintain a high level of quality, even if this is sometimes to the detriment of sales growth. The aim is also to rebalance the weight of the various divisions, with leather still accounting for 47% of sales in 2012.

=== Relationship to the equestrian world ===
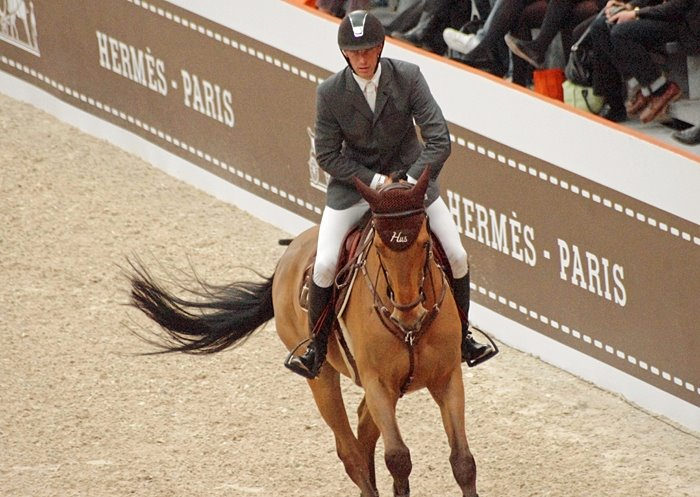
Rider Kevin Staut during the 2012 saut Hermès.

Founded as a saddlery and harness maker, Hermès has always focused on the horse, as illustrated by a quip attributed to Jean-Louis Dumas: "Our first customer is the horse. The second, the rider". At the beginning of the 20th century, with the advent of the automobile and transatlantic travel, it broadened its focus to leather good; still, it continues to provide equestrian goods.

In 2009, Hermès created the Saut Hermès, a certified CSI 5* Concours de Saut International show jumping competition, the highest International Federation for Equestrian Sports category classification. Beyond the competitions, the event is peppered with equestrian shows and demonstrations.

=== Hermès stores ===
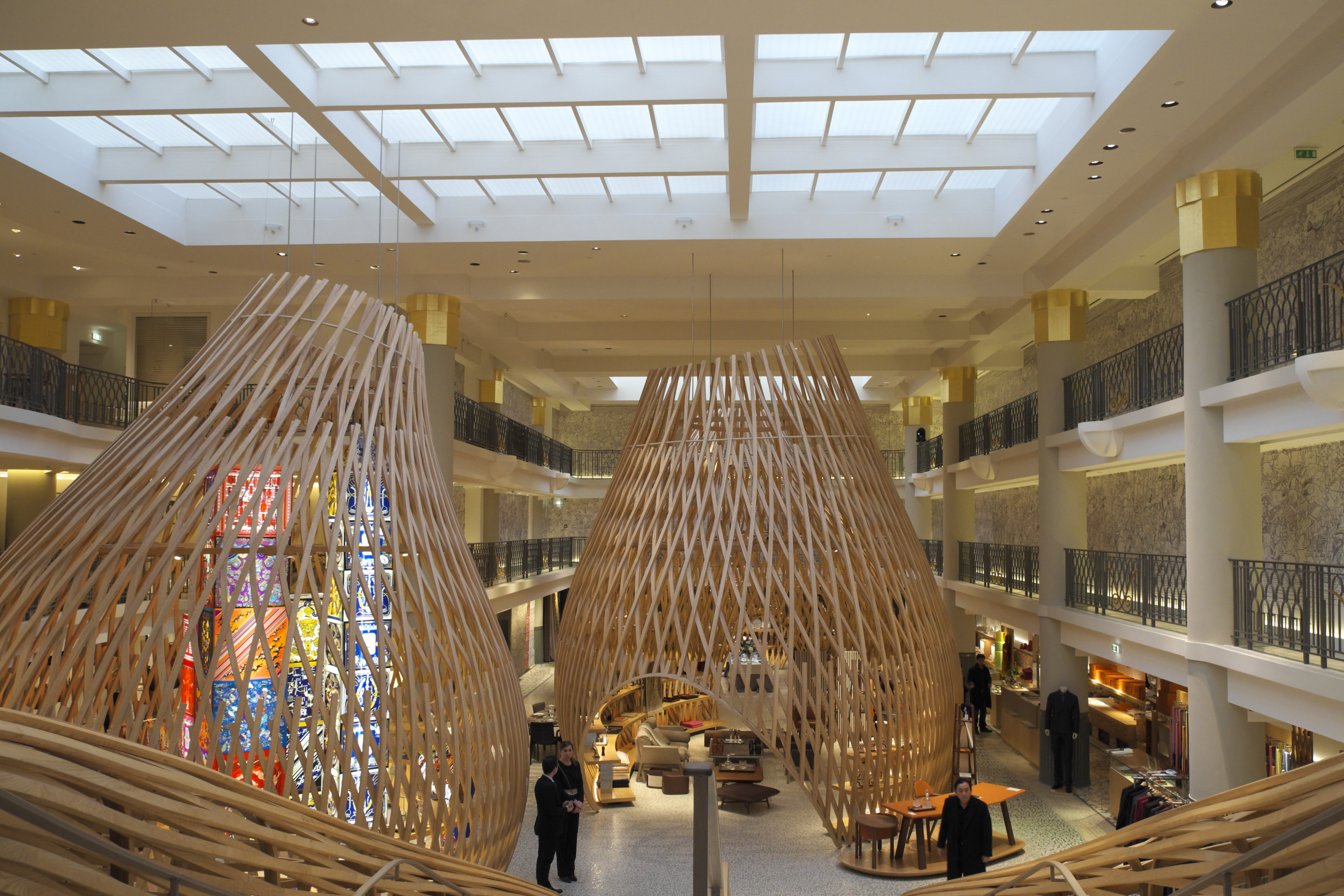
Boutique in the former Lutetia swimming-pool in Paris.

The Hermès distribution network includes nearly 300 stores in 45 countries, plus a presence in specialty stores for watches, perfumes, and tableware. Hermès' iconic and founding store, the brand's first “Maison”, is located at 24 rue du Faubourg Saint-Honoré in Paris and has existed since the company's beginnings in 1880.

Between 1880 and 1920, the first stores opened in France in seaside resorts, spa towns or cities related to equitation. Hermès' international expansion began in New York City, with hatmaker Dobb's in 1924, and continued more broadly after World War II, with the development of a network of directly operated stores.

Between 1950 and 2000, this network expanded internationally. From the 2000s onwards, Hermès opened new “maisons”, flagship-style stores, in various countries. In September 2000, the second after 24 rue du Faubourg Saint-Honoré in Paris appeared in New York City, on Madison Avenue. Other Hermès “houses” would follow in 2001 in the Ginza district, in Tokyo, in 2006 in Seoul or in 2014 in Shanghai.

In November 2010, the company opened a new store in the Hôtel Lutetia, in the 6th arrondissement of Paris. Being a former swimming pool built in 1935 and listed as a monument historique, major renovation work was required to transform the premises into a store. It is spread over two levels and showcases all the company's divisions, with a particular focus on the home. The space also features a bookshop and a teahouse.

In 2026, Hermès opened its sixth "Maison", a store bringing together all of its craft divisions, in London, on Bond Street.

=== Workshops ===
The Hermès Group has some sixty production sites, which account for around 60% of total output, most of them in France. The first workshop opened at 24 rue du Faubourg Saint-Honoré in 1880, and it wasn't until 1989 that the first dedicated silk workshop outside Paris opened, in Lyon. Hermès, for example, has a leather-working workshop in the village of Saint-Vincent-de-Paul, near Bordeaux, where it employs 180 people. Others have recently opened in Louviers in the Eure, in Tournes in the Ardennes or in Riom in the Puy-de-Dôme. Some fifteen workshops are also dedicated to repairing around 200,000 products every year.

Hermès sends around 80 master trainers, employees who have worked for the group for at least eight years, to each new workshop to train incoming craftspeople. This mission is completed in an average of eighteen months. Assembly-line work is outlawed, and the emphasis is on quality rather than productivity. In leather goods, for example, each bag is handcrafted. In September 2021, Hermès opened the École Hermès des savoir-faire, accredited by the French Ministry of Education, and awards a Certificat d'aptitude professionnelle (CAP) leatherwork diploma. In 2022, it also received accreditation from the French Federation of Leather Goods to issue the cutting and sewing Certificat de qualification professionnelle (CQP).

=== petit h ===
The “petit h” or “re-creation workshop” was launched in 2010 under the impetus of Pascale Mussard, a member of the sixth generation of the Hermès family, who would later become its artistic director. Based in Pantin on the premises of Hermès, it is a creative laboratory of objects based on the recovery and detours of materials. The materials used come from offcuts derived from various Hermès divisions, but also from those of other Group brands, such as Cristalleries de Saint-Louis or Puiforcat. It enables former craftsmen to give a second life to scraps of leather, fabric, silk or even buttons, buckles, Saint-Louis crystal and any other prestige material that has a defect and is destined to be used no more. Initially sold on an ad hoc basis, petit h productions have, since 2013, had their own dedicated space in the Hermès boutique at 17 rue de Sèvres in Paris.

=== The Hermès Foundation ===
The corporate foundation Hermès was created in 2008 on the initiative of Pierre-Alexis Dumas. Its vocation is to support actions in favor of artistic creation and the transmission of know-how, solidarity and the preservation of biodiversity. It develops its own programs such as exhibitions and artist residencies for the visual arts. In 2016, for example, the foundation was behind Manufacto, a program to raise awareness of workmanship among the younger generation in schools. Students design their own objects such as stools or lamps, discovering the techniques, gestures and tools of craftsmen. The foundation operates several contemporary art spaces, including La Verrière in Brussels, Belgium, Le Forum in Tokyo, Japan, and Atelier Hermès in Seoul, South Korea.

The foundation also created the Émile Hermès prize in 2007, which rewards an innovative project in the field of design every two years.

== Other Group brands ==
=== John Lobb ===
John Lobb founded John Lobb Bootmaker in 1866, in London. It manufactures and markets mainly custom-made boots and dress boots for men, but also collections of ready-to-wear and leather accessories. It opened its first store in France in 1900, and Hermès bought the one in Paris in 1976. Only the London store remains to this day in the hands of the founder's family. Hermès then developed the John Lobb brand and opened stores worldwide. Today, both companies continue to uphold their tradition of custom-made shoe-making, with the original Lobb family workshop in London and the Hermès-owned workshop in Paris.

=== Puiforcat ===
Puiforcat is a goldsmith and silversmith company founded in Paris in 1820, by brothers Émile and Joseph-Marie Puiforcat and their cousin Jean-Baptiste Fuchs. Initially a simple cutlery, Puiforcat gradually transformed into a goldsmith workshop to offer table setting and lifestyle objects, in classical, Art Deco and contemporary art styles. The company came under the full control of Hermès in 1993. It has since maintained, like the rest of the group, a tradition of savoir-faire and craftsmanship for all its pieces, some of which require several hundred hours of work.

=== Compagnie des Cristalleries de Saint-Louis ===
Saint-Louis was founded in 1586 in Saint-Louis-lès-Bitche in Moselle and is the oldest crystallerie in Europe. At the time, it was not yet producing crystal, but glass, as crystal was not discovered in France until 1781. In 1767, it obtained the title of Verrerie Royale de Saint-Louis, by order of King Louis XV. It abandoned glass to specialize solely in crystal in 1825. Saint-Louis introduced the notion of table setting arts into everyday language. Bought out by Hermès in 1989, it has since specialized in mouth-blown and hand-cut crystal for tableware, lighting, and decoration.

== Company management ==
Since it was founded in Paris in 1837 by Thierry Hermès, Hermès International has been run almost exclusively by him and his descendants. Today, Hermès is majority-owned by the family and has been headed since 2013 by Axel Dumas, a member of the sixth generation.

=== Executive committee ===
- Axel Dumas, executive chairman
- Florian Craen, executive vice president sales and distribution
- Charlotte David, executive vice president communication
- Pierre-Alexis Dumas, artistic executive vice-president
- Nicolas Martin, executive vice-president - general secretary
- Wilfried Guerrand, managing director Métiers, information systems and data
- Sharon MacBeath, executive vice-president, human resources and sustainability
- Éric du Halgouët, executive vice president finance
- Guillaume de Seynes, executive vice president Manufacturing Division and equity investments
- Agnès de Villers, chairwoman and executive vice president of Hermès Perfume and Beauty, executive vice president of Hermès Horizon, petit h, and Internet of Things (IoT)

=== Artistic direction ===
- Pierre-Alexis Dumas, artistic director of Hermès
- Pierre Hardy, creative director of Hermès shoes and jewellery
- Christine Nagel, director of olfactory creation for Hermès Parfums
- Véronique Nichanian, artistic director of the men’s universe (from 2027 Grace Wales Bonner, creative director of men’s ready-to-wear)
- Nadège Vanhée, artistic director of women's ready-to-wear

=== Artistic direction timeline ===
Artistic Director-Creative Director-Designer	Start year	End year	Ref.
Thierry Hermès	1837	1880	
Charles-Émile Hermès	1880	1902	
Émile-Maurice Hermès	1902	1951	
Robert Dumas	1951	1978	
Jean-Louis Dumas	1978	2005	
Pierre-Alexis Dumas	2005	present	
Womenswear
Lola Prusac	1926	1935	
Catherine de Károlyi	1967	1980	
Martin Margiela	1997	2003	
Jean Paul Gaultier	2003	2010	
Christophe Lemaire	2010	2014	
Nadège Vanhée	2014	present	
Menswear
Véronique Nichanian	1988	2026	
Grace Wales Bonner	2027		
Footwear
Claude Brouet			
Pierre Hardy	1990	present	
Jewellery
Pierre Hardy	2001	present	
Perfume
Jean-Claude Ellena	2004	2016	
Christine Nagel	2014	present	

== Financial information ==
Hermès International is listed on Euronext Paris and is a component of the CAC 40:

Financial data (in million euros)
Year	2014	2015	2016	2017	2018	2019	2020	2021	2022	2023	2024	2025
Revenue	4,118	4,840	5,202	5,549	5,966	6,682	6,683	8,962	11,602	13,427	15,170	16 ,002
Profit	1,299	1,541	1,697	1,922	2,075	2,339	1,981	3,530	4,697	5,650	6,150	6,569
Net income	859	973	1,100	1,222	1,405	1,528	1,385	2,445	3,367	4,311	4,603	4,524

=== Shareholder structure ===
Hermès International is controlled, through Emile Hermès SAS, by the Hermès family group, which also holds, notably through H51 SAS, a majority stake in the company's share capital as an active partner. The Hermès family fortune was estimated in 2024 at 155 billion euros by the magazine Challenges.

As of March 12, 2025:

Nom	%
H51 (family holding)	66.72%
Nicolas Puech	4.91%
Arnault family	1.87%
Nicolas Puech Foundation	0.85%
Hermès International (self-control)	0.79%

== Bibliography ==
- "A Boutique Where You Don't Just Buy – You Invest," Vogue, October 1974.
- Van Dyke, Grace, "Hermès: Old World Luxury in the New World," USA Today, July 1994.
- Dryansky, G.Y., "Hermès: Quality with a Kick," Harper's Bazaar, April 1986.
- Berman, Phyllis, "Mass Production? Yech!," Forbes, 22 September 1986.
- "Scarves Everywhere," The New Yorker, 30 January 1989.
- Aillaud, Charlotte, "The Hermès Museum: Inspiration for the Celebrated Family Firm," Architectural Digest (U.S.), January 1989.
- Tompkins, Mimi, "Sweatshop of the Stars," U.S. News & World Report, 12 February 1990.
- Gandee, Charles, "Jean-Louis Dumas-Hermès Is Flying High," House & Garden (New York), August 1990.
- "The Handbags to Have," The New York Times, 14 April 1991.
- "Hermès: Still in the Saddle," Women's Wear Daily, 25 September 1991.
- "Hermès of Paris, Inc.," The New York Times, 5 October 1991.
- Slesin, Susan, "Ah, the Horse," The New York Times, 21 May 1992.
- Ellena, Jean-Claude, Perfume: The Alchemy of Scent, New York: Arcade, 2009.
- Burr, Chandler, The Perfect Scent: A Year Inside the Perfume Industry in Paris and New York, New York: Henry Holt, 2007.
- Frimes, William, "Jean-Louis Dumas, Chief of Hermès, Dies at 72", The New York Times, 3 May 2010.
- Colino, Nadine, The Hermès Scarf: History & Mistique, New York: Thames & Hudson, 2010.
- Rocca, Federico, Hermès - L'avventura del lusso, Torino: Lindau, 2011.
