= Eric N. Mack =

American artist (born 1987)

- Born: Eric National Mack; 1987 (age 38–39); Columbia, Maryland, US
- Education: The Cooper Union; BFA, 2010; Yale School of Art; MFA, 2012

Eric National Mack (born 1987, Columbia, Maryland) is an American painter, multi-media installation artist, and sculptor, based in New York City.

== Early life and education ==
Mack was born in Columbia, Maryland. He attended Suitland High School in Forestville Maryland for their well known CVPA(Center for Visual and Performing Arts) Program where he majored in Sculpture, Drawing, Painting, and Printmaking. His middle name is National, after Washington DC's National Gallery of Art—where his parents met. At an early age, Mack worked for his father at his discount clothing store interacting with a spectrum of fashions and fabrics. Mack's fabric collages often include a spectrum of materials such as moving blankets, bandanas, and other found or locally sourced fabrics.

Mack received his BFA from The Cooper Union in 2010 and his MFA from Yale in 2012. In a 2019 interview with Mahfuz Sultan for PIN-UP Magazine, he is quoted stating that he made most of his work outside while at Yale.

== Exhibitions and residencies ==
Solo exhibitions

- Eric N. Mack, Douglas Hyde Gallery, Trinity College, Dublin, Ireland (2022)
- Eric N. Mack: Cuts, Móran Móran, Mexico City, Mexico (2022)
- Eric N. Mack: Lemme walk across the room, NSU Art Museum, Fort Lauderdale, Florida (based on an exhibition originally presented by the Brooklyn Museum) (2021–2022)
- Eric N. Mack: Face It, Móran Móran, Los Angeles, California (2020)
- In austerity, stripped from its support and worn as a sarong, The Power Station, Dallas, Texas (2019)
- Dye Lens, Scrap Metal Gallery, Toronto, Canada (2019)
- Lemme walk across the room, Brooklyn Museum, New York (2019)
- the BALTIC Artists’ Award 2017, BALTIC Centre for Contemporary Art, Gateshead, UK (2017)
- Eric Mack: Vogue Fabrics, Albright–Knox Art Gallery, Buffalo, New York (2017)
- Eric N. Mack: Never Had A Dream, Móran Móran, Los Angeles, California (2015)

Group exhibitions

- Looking Back / The 12th White Columns Annual, curated by Mary Manning, White Columns (2022)
- Whitney Biennial, 2019, Whitney Museum of American Art, New York, New York (2019)
- Grace Wales Bonner: A Time for New Dreams, Serpentine Gallery, London, UK (2018)
- Ungestalt, Kunsthalle Basel, Basel, Switzerland (2017)
- In the Abstract, Massachusetts Museum of Contemporary Art, Massachusetts, Massachusetts (2017)
- Blue Black, Pulitzer Arts Foundation, St Louis, Missouri (2017)
- Making & Unmaking: An exhibition curated by Duro Olowu, Camden Arts Centre, London, UK (2016)
- Greater New York 2015, MoMA PS1, Long Island City, New York (2015)

Residencies

- 2017 Rauschenberg Residency
- 2014–2015 The Studio Museum in Harlem Artist-in-Residency Program

== Public collections ==
- Albright-Knox Gallery, Buffalo, New York
- The Studio Museum in Harlem, New York, New York
- Whitney Museum of American Art, New York, New York
- Hood Museum of Art, Hanover, New Hampshire

== Selected bibliography ==
- Vitamin T: Threads & Textiles in Contemporary Art (Phaidon, 2019)
- Prime: Art's Next Generation (Phaidon, 2022)
- Young, Gifted, and Black (DAP, 2020)
