= Patrick Thomas (businessman) =

French business executive (born 1947)

- Born: 16 June 1947 (age 77); Burgundy region, France
- Education: ESCP Business School
- Occupation: Businessman
- Title: Former CEO, Hermès
- Term: 2003-2014
- Predecessor: Jean-Louis Dumas
- Successor: Axel Dumas

Patrick Thomas (born 16 June 1947) is a French business executive. He was the chief executive officer (CEO) of the fashion house Hermès from 2003 to 2014.

== Early life ==
Thomas was born on 16 June 1947, in the Burgundy region of France to a family of winemakers, and graduated from ESCP Business School.

== Career ==
Thomas started his career in 1969 at International Telephone & Telegraph, a US manufacturing company. In 1971, he joined Pampryl, a French fruit juice producer founded by his grandfather, and then owned by Pernod Ricard. In 1980, he became chief financial officer (CFO) of Pernod Ricard, and later the UK managing director.

In 1989, he joined Hermès as chief operating officer (COO), and left in 1997 to become CEO of Lancaster Group, a cosmetics company, and then became the first non-family member to be CEO of the scotch whisky producer William Grant & Sons.

Thomas became CEO of Hermès in 2003, following the retirement of Jean-Louis Dumas, until January 2014, when he retired, and was succeeded by Axel Dumas, a sixth-generation member of the Hermès-Dumas family.
