= Saddlery =

Artisan for horse tack

Saddlery is a trade that creates and repairs horse tack such as saddles, harnesses, and bridles, primarily of leather. Those involved in the trade are called saddlers or harness makers. Saddlery has been found in equestrian cultures around the world since antiquity. An individual artisan may focus on specific gear for riding or driving—and often develops specialties, such as dressage, show jumping, Western riding, or regional styles like Camargue riding.

== Terminology ==
The craft is generally called saddlery, subsuming harness making. Sometimes the longer form saddler and harness maker is used.

== Training and qualifications ==
Training programs for saddlers vary internationally. Formal courses are typically designed to cultivate craftsmanship and a strong understanding of horse anatomy, rider needs, and safe equipment standards. This training helps meet the needs of both small workshops and larger luxury brands.

In the UK, saddlers may be certified or trained through industry guilds—such as the Society of Master Saddlers, sponsored by the Worshipful Company of Saddlers—or via structured apprenticeships, which blend hands-on workshop training with academic coursework.

In France, there is a Certificat d'aptitude professionnelle (CAP) in leatherwork, with specializations in saddlery and harness making. The CAP covers both technical skills (hand-stitching, pattern cutting, and assembly) and theoretical knowledge (materials science, ergonomics, and sometimes art history). Senior artisans may be honored by the title of artisan d'art (artisanal craftsperson) by the Chamber of Trades (Chambre des Métiers). Some training programs are sponsored by industry: Hermès's École Hermès des savoir-faire, Groupe SIS's E.M.A (École de Maroquinerie d’Avoudrey).

== Industry ==
Some artisans work entirely by hand, especially for bespoke or luxury commissions, while others utilize modern machinery for the majority of stitching and assembly. This diversity allows saddlery to serve a wide range of clientele, from working equestrians to international sports competitors and luxury consumers. Saddlers can operate as independent artisans, in small workshops, or as employees of large equestrian brands—ranging from bespoke operations to international houses like Hermès or Antares.

== See also ==
- Worshipful Company of Saddlers
