= Jean-Louis Dumas =

French businessman, chairman of the Hermès group from 1978 to 2006

- Born: Jean-Louis Robert Frédéric Dumas; 2 February 1938; Paris, France
- Died: 1 May 2010 (aged 72); Paris, France
- Education: Institut d'Études Politiques de Paris
- Occupations: Businessman, designer
- Known for: Hermès chairman and design chief
- Board member of: Hermès
- Spouse: Rena Gregoriadès (m. 1962; died 2009)
- Children: Pierre-Alexis and Sandrine
- Relatives: Olivier Dumas, Philippe Dumas (brothers)

Jean-Louis Dumas was a French businessman. A descendant of its founder Thierry Hermès, he headed Hermès from 1978 to 2006. He left his mark on the world of fashion and luxury.

He began his career at Hermès in 1964, becoming managing director in 1971 under the supervision of his father, Robert Dumas, and then chairman in 1978. He introduced major innovations, expanded the product range and developed Hermès' international presence. Under his leadership, Hermès diversified into areas such as ready-to-wear, silk and watchmaking, and acquired prestigious brands such as John Lobb and Puiforcat. The creation of the Birkin bag, following a chance meeting with Jane Birkin, symbolizes the innovative spirit and success of the brand under his leadership. He retired for health reasons from the business in 2006.

== Early life and education ==
Born in Paris in February 1938, Jean-Louis Dumas is the fourth of six children of Robert Dumas and Jacqueline Hermès, and the grandson of Émile-Maurice Hermès. He is also the brother of Olivier Dumas and the uncle of Axel Dumas, managing director of Hermès since 2013. He obtained a degree in law and economics in Paris in 1959 and a degree in political science from Sciences Po in 1960. He travelled in Scandinavia and Czechoslovakia while the drummer of a jazz ensemble. He did part of his military service in Algeria, during the war for that country's independence and just before the Évian Accords. He also traveled in Iran, Afghanistan, and Nepal in a Citroën 2CV.

He met Rena Grégoriades in 1959, while she was a student at the École nationale supérieure des arts appliqués et des métiers d'art in Paris. They got married in 1962. Born in Athens in 1937, she was an interior architect and furniture designer. Rena Dumas opened her own agency, Rena Dumas Architecture Intérieure, in Paris in 1972. She was responsible for the design of more than 300 Hermès boutiques, including the historic 24 rue du Faubourg Saint-Honoré in Paris. They have two children: Sandrine, born in 1963 and an actress and director; and Pierre-Alexis, born in 1966 and current artistic director of Hermès.

== Career at Hermès ==
After spending a year in New York City as an assistant buyer at Bloomingdale's, Dumas joined Hermès in 1964, at the age of 26, which his family had founded in 1837. Under the supervision of his father, Robert, who was running the company at the time, he was appointed managing director in 1971, a position he would hold for seven years.

Dumas became chairman in 1978. He expanded Hermès' range of activities by developing the silk, leather and ready-to-wear divisions, while integrating new trades with traditional methods. He also established the horology subsidiary, La Montre Hermès SA, in Bienne, Switzerland and developed the brand's presence abroad, particularly in Europe, Asia and the United States. Under his leadership, Hermès diversified into enamel and porcelain, acquired the British John Lobb Bootmaker, the Compagnie des Cristalleries de Saint-Louis or the goldsmith Puiforcat.

Also artistic director of Hermès, Dumas took the gamble of appointing divisive figures to key positions, as it was the case in 1997 when he entrusted Martin Margiela with the direction of the women's ready-to-wear branch. After his departure in 2003, Dumas appointed Jean-Paul Gaultier as his successor, a controversial figure in fashion. Gaultier's creativity, playing with the brand's emblematic leathers and silks, won over the public and led to a significant increase in sales of the craft. In 1978, he also entrusted Leïla Menchari with decorating the windows of the Faubourg Saint Honoré shop and directing the silk colour committee.

Following a chance meeting between Dumas and Jane Birkin, the Birkin bag, which became one of the emblems of Hermès along with the Kelly bag and the carré de soie, was created in 1984. The actress, sitting next to Dumas on the plane, expressed the need for a practical bag for a young mother that could hold scripts and diapers. Birkin proposed the idea of a bag larger than the existing Kelly bag. In return, Dumas agreed to make the bag, promising to give it the name ″Birkin″ if she approved the design, which she did.

In 1993, Dumas led the successful initial public offering of Hermès, in which the family still holds a 66.7% stake.

== Retirement and posterity ==
Jean-Louis Dumas directed and transformed Hermès until 2006, when he retired from the group for health reasons. He left the reins of the company to Patrick Thomas, the first company director not to be a descendant of Thierry Hermès. He ensured the company's financial independence and success as well as family cohesion. Many descendants of Thierry Hermès still hold management positions within the group today, such as Axel Dumas, Jean-Louis' nephew and managing director, or Pierre-Alexis, his son, who took over the position of artistic director in 2005.

Jean-Louis Dumas died in Paris on 1 May 2010, at the age of 72. A passionate photographer, always having a Leica camera close, he took photographs all his life. In 2008, his daughter Sandrine Dumas held an exhibition of them at the Maison européenne de la photographie, in Paris, entitled Jean-Louis Dumas : Photographe.

== Distinctions ==
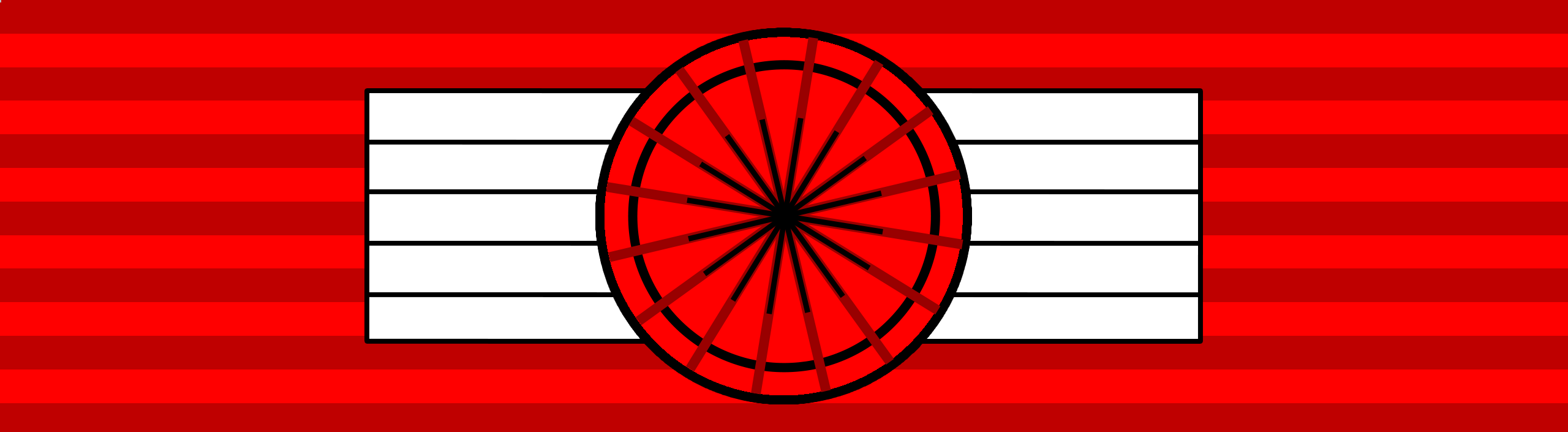
- Commander of the Legion of Honour
- Officer of the Order of Arts and Letters
