= First =

First most commonly refers to:

- First, the ordinal form of the number 1

First or 1st may also refer to:

== Acronyms ==
- Faint Images of the Radio Sky at Twenty-Centimeters, an astronomical survey carried out by the Very Large Array
- Far Infrared and Sub-millimetre Telescope, of the Herschel Space Observatory
- For Inspiration and Recognition of Science and Technology, an international youth organization
- Forum of Incident Response and Security Teams, a global cybersecurity organization

== Arts and entertainment ==
=== Albums ===
- 1st (album), by Streets, 1983
- 1ST (SixTones album), 2021
- First (David Gates album), 1973
- First, by Denise Ho, 2001
- First (O'Bryan album), 2007
- First (Raymond Lam album), 2011

=== Extended plays ===
- 1st, by The Rasmus, 1995
- First (Baroness EP), 2004
- First (Ferlyn G EP), 2015

=== Songs ===
- "First" (Lindsay Lohan song), 2005
- "First" (Cold War Kids song), 2014
- "First", by Lauren Daigle from the album How Can It Be, 2015
- "First", by Niki and Gabi, 2017
- "First", by Jonas Brothers from the album Happiness Begins, 2018
- "First", by Everglow from the single album Last Melody, 2021
- "First", by Schoolboy Q from the album Blue Lips, 2024

== People ==
- 1$T, American musician
- Craig First (born 1960), American composer
- David First (born 1953), American composer
- Joshua First, American historian
- Michael First (born 1956), American psychiatrist
- Nenad Firšt (born 1964), Slovene composer
- Kanaphan Puitrakul (born 1998), Thai actor whose nickname is First

== Places ==
- 1st meridian east, a line of longitude extending through Europe and Africa
- 1st meridian west, a line of longitude extending through Europe and Africa
- 1st parallel north, a circle of latitude just above the Equator
- 1st parallel south, a circle of latitude just below the Equator
- First Avenue (disambiguation)
- First Street (disambiguation)
- First (Grindelwald), Canton of Bern, Switzerland
- First (Kandersteg), Canton of Bern, Switzerland

== Dates ==
- First of the month, a recurring calendar date
  - First of January
  - First of February
  - First of March
  - First of April
  - First of May
  - First of June
  - First of July
  - First of August
  - First of September
  - First of October
  - First of November
  - First of December

== Other uses ==
- First, a British undergraduate degree classification
- FiRST, a magazine merged into the Singaporean newspaper The New Paper
- Unison, a pitch interval
- First (perfume), by Van Cleef & Arpels
- The First News Channel, a Belarusian television news channel
- 1st Bangor Old Boys F.C., a football team from Northern Ireland

== See also ==
- Category:Lists of firsts
- First Amendment (disambiguation)
- First Army (disambiguation)
- First Division (disambiguation)
- First Lady (disambiguation)
- First man (disambiguation)
- First Nations (disambiguation)
- First person (disambiguation)
- First Place (disambiguation)
- First Things First (disambiguation)
- First War (disambiguation)
- First woman (disambiguation)
- FST (disambiguation)
- Ist (disambiguation)
- La 1ère (disambiguation) (French: La Première, lit. 'The First')
- Number One (disambiguation)
- One (disambiguation)
- Preliminary (disambiguation)
- Premiere (disambiguation)
- Primary (disambiguation)
- The First (disambiguation)
- First and Foremost, a compilation album by David Campbell, 2008
- First grade, the starting year of primary education
- First of All, a song by Doja Cat, 2023
- First Racing, a former Italian motor racing team
- FirstGroup, a British transportation company
- Front-runner, the leader in an electoral race
- Fürst, a German princely title
- Fürst (surname)
- Gold medal, awarded for highest achievement in a civilian field
- Proto-, an English prefix meaning "first"
- World record, the best recorded and verified performance in a specific activity
