= Premier (disambiguation) =

A premier is a head of government, in several countries and sub-national jurisdictions.

Premier may also refer to:

== Automotives ==
- Premier Automobiles Limited, an Indian automobile manufacturer
- Premier Motor Manufacturing Company, a defunct US automobile manufacturer
- Premier Motorcycles, a defunct British motorcycles manufacturer
- Eagle Premier, a car made by the Chrysler Corporation from 1988 to 1992
- Holden Premier, a car made in Australia from 1962 to 1980

== Music ==
- Premier Radio, a Christian radio station in London
- DJ Premier, an influential hip-hop DJ and producer
- The Premiers, 1960s garage band who performed "Farmer John"
- Premier, a British maker of high quality Jazz and Rock drum kits.

== Organisations ==
- Premier (cycling team), a Russian road-racing team 2006–2007
- Premier Foods, a British-based food manufacturer
- Premier Health Partners, a hospital network company based in Dayton, Ohio
- Premier Percussion Limited, a Leicestershire-based manufacturer of drums and percussion instruments
- Premier Rides, a rollercoaster manufacturing company based in Millersvile, Maryland, USA
- Premier Stores, a symbol group of retailers in the United Kingdom

== Other ==
- Premier, Bell County, Kentucky
- Premier, Switzerland, a town in Switzerland
- Premier (cigarette), a smokeless cigarette released by the R.J. Reynolds Tobacco Company
- Beechcraft Premier, a jet aircraft made by Hawker Beechcraft
- Premier Sports, a group of sports television channels broadcasting in United Kingdom
- Premiér, Czech television sitcom

== See also ==
- WTA Premier tournaments, the elite category of tournaments on the Women's Tennis Association
- Premier League (disambiguation)
- Premiere, a first performance
- Premiere (disambiguation), including "Première"
- Premiership (disambiguation)
- La 1ère (disambiguation) (French: La Première, lit. 'The First'), "Première", feminine of "le premier"
- First (disambiguation), premier
