= Claudio Echeverri =

Argentine footballer (born 2006)

Personal information
- Full name: Claudio Jeremías Echeverri
- Date of birth: 2 January 2006 (age 20)
- Place of birth: Resistencia, Chaco, Argentina
- Positions: Attacking midfielder; winger

Team information
- Current team: Benfica (on loan from Manchester City)
- Number: 30

Youth career
- Deportivo Luján
- 2017–2023: River Plate

Senior career*
Years	Team	Apps	(Gls)
2023	River Plate	5	(0)
2024–	Manchester City	1	(0)
2024	→ River Plate (loan)	30	(3)
2025–2026	→ Bayer Leverkusen (loan)	6	(0)
2026	→ Girona (loan)	17	(1)
2026–	→ Benfica (loan)	3	(0)

International career^{‡}
2022–2023	Argentina U17	15	(10)
2025–	Argentina U20	9	(6)
2024–	Argentina U23	10	(1)
Medal record
Men's football
Representing Argentina
South American U-20 Championship
Second place	2025 Venezuela
- * Club domestic league appearances and goals as of 23 May 2026 ‡ National team caps and goals as of 17 February 2025

Claudio Jeremías Echeverri (born 2 January 2006) is an Argentine professional footballer who plays as an attacking midfielder or winger for Primeira Liga club Benfica, on loan from Premier League club Manchester City. He also plays for the Argentina U-23 national team.

== Club career ==
=== River Plate ===
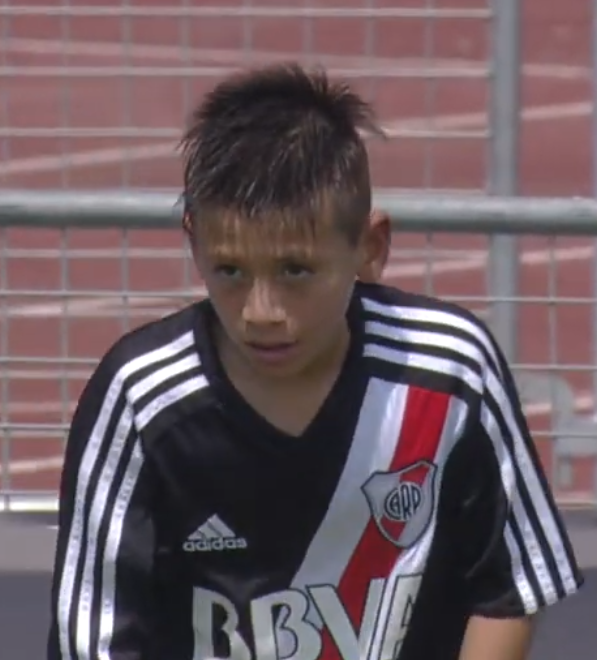
11-year-old Echeverri against the Juventus children's team

Born in Resistencia, Chaco Province, Echeverri started his career with Deportivo Luján, before trialling with River Plate at the end of 2016, going on to sign officially the following year. He first rose to international attention in the footballing world for his performances at a children's tournament in Venice, Italy with River. Despite his team finishing third in the tournament, he scored nine goals in six games, stating "The truth is that we are not happy [finishing third], we wanted to be champions".

In October 2022, he scored on his debut for River's reserve team against Patronato's reserve. He signed his first professional contract with River in December of the same year, with a release clause reportedly worth 25 million dollars. On 11 October 2023, he was named by English newspaper The Guardian as one of the best players born in 2006 worldwide.

On 22 June 2023, at 17 years, 5 months and 20 days old, he made his professional debut in a league match against Instituto, coming on as a substitute for Ignacio Fernández. He provided an assist during the game, helping River Plate to a 3–1 victory.

On 22 December 2023, during a post-match interview after conquering the Trofeo de Campeones with River Plate, Echeverri announced that he would not renew his contract with the club, which was due to expire on 31 December 2024.

=== Manchester City ===
On 25 January 2024, Echeverri agreed to join Premier League club Manchester City on a four-and-a-half-year contract, remaining on loan at River Plate until January 2025. On 17 March, he scored his first professional goal against Gimnasia in a 3–1 Copa de la Liga Profesional victory.

Following his return to Manchester, he made his debut for City on 17 May 2025 in their 1–0 defeat to Crystal Palace in the FA Cup final, coming on as a substitute for Omar Marmoush in the 76th minute. On 25 May, he made his Premier League debut in a 2–0 victory over Fulham on the final day of the season, when he came on to replace Erling Haaland in the 85th minute. On 22 June, he scored his first goal for City in their 6–0 win against Al Ain in the FIFA Club World Cup group stage.

==== Loan to Bayer Leverkusen ====
On 21 August 2025, Echeverri joined Bundesliga club Bayer Leverkusen on loan for the 2025–26 season. He made his debut for the club two days later, coming on as a 84th-minute substitute in a 2–1 home defeat against Hoffenheim in the league. Echeverri was recalled by City on 19 December.

==== Loan to Girona ====
On 18 January 2026, Echeverri joined La Liga club Girona FC on loan for the remainder of the 2025–26 season.

==== Loan to Benfica ====
On 2 September 2026, Echeverri joined Primeira Liga club Benfica on loan for the 2026–27 season.

== International career ==
Echeverri has represented Argentina at both under-17 and under-23 levels. Echeverri scored five goals and assisted thrice for Argentina in the 2023 South American U-17 Championship in Ecuador, where Argentina ended third and qualified them for the 2023 FIFA U-17 World Cup in Indonesia. On 24 November 2023, he scored a hat-trick in a 3–0 quarter-final victory over rivals Brazil. He scored five goals and won the Bronze Boot as Argentina lost to eventual winners Germany on penalties in the semi-finals before losing to Mali in the third place match. He also represented Argentina U-23 in the 2024 CONMEBOL Pre-Olympic Tournament in Venezuela where they qualified for the 2024 Olympic Games.

== Style of play ==
A gifted playmaker, Echeverri has been nicknamed El Diablito (English: little devil) after former Bolivian international footballer Marco Etcheverry, who was nicknamed El Diablo, as the two share "devilish" dribbling, pace in one-on-one situations, and a powerful shot, as well as a similar last name. He has listed Lionel Messi and River player Juan Fernando Quintero as two players he idolises. Unlike Messi, he is right-footed, but they are similar in stature (171 cm) and share that low centre of gravity dribbling style.

== Career statistics ==
=== Club ===
As of match played 23 May 2026

Appearances and goals by club, season and competition
Club	Season	League			National cup (Note: Includes Copa Argentina, FA Cup)		League cup (Note: Includes Copa de la Liga Profesional)		Continental		Other		Total	
Club	Season	Division	Apps	Goals	Apps	Goals	Apps	Goals	Apps	Goals	Apps	Goals	Apps	Goals
River Plate	2023	Argentine Primera División	5	0	0	0	1	0	0	0	1 (Note: Appearance in Trofeo de Campeones)	0	7	0
River Plate	2024 (Note: On loan from Manchester City)	Argentine Primera División	30	3	1	0	10	1	10 (Note: Appearances in Copa Libertadores)	1	1 (Note: Appearance in Supercopa Argentina)	0	52	5
River Plate	Total		35	3	1	0	11	1	10	1	2	0	59	5
Manchester City	2024–25	Premier League	1	0	1	0	—		0	0	1 (Note: Appearance in FIFA Club World Cup)	1	3	1
Bayer Leverkusen (loan)	2025–26	Bundesliga	6	0	0	0	—		5 (Note: Appearances in UEFA Champions League)	0	—		11	0
Girona (loan)	2025–26	La Liga	17	1	—		—		—		—		17	1
Benfica (loan)	2026–27	Primera Liga	0	0	0	0	0	0	0	0	—		0	0
Career total			59	4	2	0	11	1	15	1	3	1	90	7

== Honours ==
River Plate

- Primera División: 2023
- Supercopa Argentina: 2023
- Trofeo de Campeones: 2023

Individual

- FIFA U-17 World Cup Bronze Boot: 2023
