= The Different Company =

The Different Company is a luxury perfume house established in 2000 by perfumer Jean-Claude Ellena and Thierry de Baschmakoff in Paris, France. Its products are available worldwide in boutiques and concept stores. Since 2005, all fragrances have been created by Céline Ellena, daughter of Jean-Claude Ellena. The line includes refillable bottles, travel sets, and leather cases. The house also collaborated with Bertrand Duchaufour, whose fragrances for The Different Company included I Miss released in 2015.

== Fragrances by Jean-Claude Ellena ==
- Bois d'Iris (2000)
- Osmanthus (2001)
- Rose Poivrée (2001) (5 stars by Chandler Burr, New York Times Magazine)
- Bergamote (2004)

== Fragrances by Celine Ellena ==
- Jasmin de Nuit (2005)
- Sel de Vetiver (2006) (5 stars by Chandler Burr, New York Times Magazine, Best Unisex Scent Award by BeautynewsNYC.com)
- Parfum d'Ailleurs et Fleurs (2006)
- Parfum de Sens et Bois (2006)
- Parfum de Charmes et Feuilles (2006)
