= Premiere (disambiguation) =

A premiere or première is the first artistic performance of theatrical, musical or other cultural presentations.

Premiere may also refer to:

== Film ==
- Premiere (1937 film), an Austrian musical crime film
- Premiere (1938 film), a British mystery film
- The Premiere (film), a 2009 mockumentary telefilm

== Television ==
=== Channels and networks ===
- La Première (Ivory Coast), an Ivorian television channel operated by Radiodiffusion Television Ivoirienne
- Premiere (TV channel), a defunct British television channel
- Réseau Outre-Mer 1^{re}, a network of radio and television stations for the overseas departments and territories of France
- Sky Deutschland, a German pay-television platform formerly known as Premiere
- Premiere (Brazil), a Brazilian television network

=== Programs ===
- Premiere (TV program), a 1951 American television program, the first commercially sponsored television program broadcast in color
- Premiere (TV series), a 1968 American anthology television series

=== Episodes ===
- "Premiere" (Farscape)
- "Premiere" (The O.C.)
- "The Premiere" (Schitt's Creek)
- "The Premiere" (Yes, Dear)

== Radio ==
- La Première (Belgium), a Belgian radio station operated by RTBF
- La Première (Switzerland), a French-language radio network in Switzerland
- Première Chaîne, a Canadian radio network operated by CBC Radio
- Premiere Networks, also formerly Premiere Radio Networks, a syndication service
- La Première (France), a network of radio and television stations for the overseas departments and territories of France

== Music ==
- Première (Katherine Jenkins album)
- Première (New Brunswick Youth Orchestra album)
- Premiere, a 2024 album by Nancy Kwai

== Other uses ==
- Adobe Premiere Pro, a video-editing software program
- Lincoln Premiere, a 1950s luxury car by the Ford Motor Company
- Première, a term in secondary education in France
- Première (magazine), a French film magazine
- Premiere (video game), a side-scrolling platform video game

== See also ==
- La 1ère (disambiguation) (French: La Première, lit. 'The First'), "Première"
- Premier (disambiguation)
- Premiership (disambiguation)
- First (disambiguation)
