= Lovely (perfume) =

2005 perfume by Sarah Jessica Parker

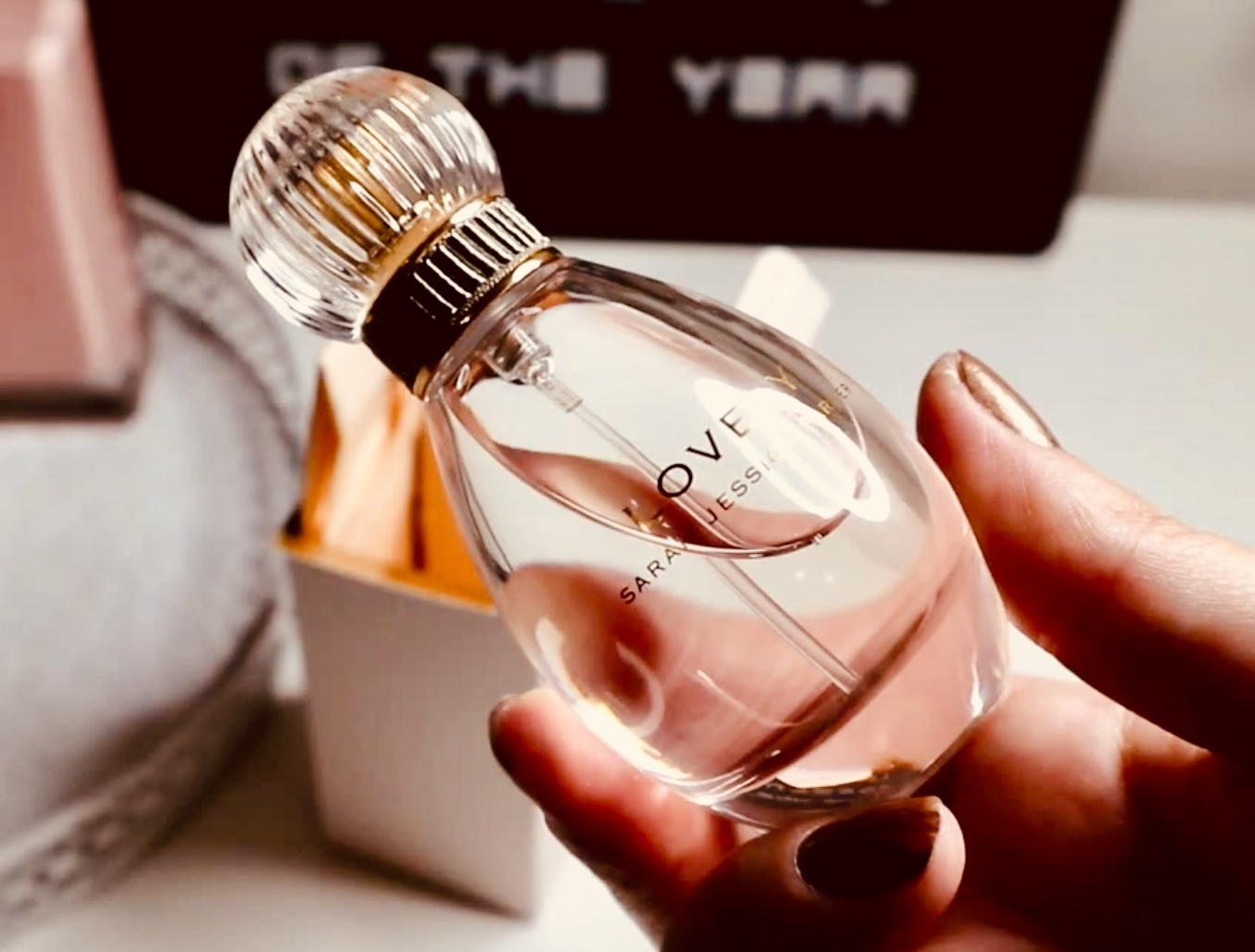
- A 30-milliliter bottle of Lovely

Fragrance by Clement Gavarry Laurent le Guernec
- Label: Sarah Jessica Parker
- Flanker(s): Lovely Sheer
- Website: sjpbysarahjessicaparker.com

Lovely is a 2005 perfume released by Sarah Jessica Parker. Parker’s first fragrance, Lovely is a light floral musk based on a blend Parker had made for herself. The perfume’s formal development was the subject of a 2008 book by New York Times perfume critic Chandler Burr called The Perfect Scent: A Year Behind the Scenes of the Perfume Industry in Paris and New York.

== Product development ==
The project began when Parker, a long-time fragrance fan, told her agent that she would like to create a scent of her own; he put her in touch with Catherine Walsh of the Lancaster Group. Though most celebrity perfumes are created via licensing deals that involve the face of the fragrance in little besides publicity for the scent, Parker, with a long-standing interest in perfumery, was an unusually active participant in the scent's creation, bringing in her own proposal to her collaborators, who included Walsh, Coty, and perfumers Clement Gavarry and Laurent le Guernec, based at International Flavors and Fragrances. Parker's proposal was for a unisex scent based on a fragrance she had mixed and wore herself, using drugstore perfume Bonne Bell Skin Musk, an Egyptian oil she bought on the street in New York, and Comme des Garçons Incense Avignon; Parker said she loved the combination for being: "Really dirty. Really sexy." However the initial effort to recreate her blend felt too "oily", and Walsh also persuaded her to aim for something more "feminine"; to that end, orange blossom and lavender were added to the formula. Reviewing the results for Allure, Lexi Novak called Lovely "exactly as delicate and feminine as it sounds", though in his review, Chandler Burr found it felt "as masculine as it is feminine". The Financial Times gave the scent a rave review, saying that in contrast to the frequently-poor reputation of celebrity fragrances, "Sarah Jessica Parker’s Lovely is so good it could be a Chanel...and is considered by connoisseurs such as Luca Turin and Tania Sanchez, authors of Perfumes: the Guide, to be the best celebrity perfume."

== Launch ==
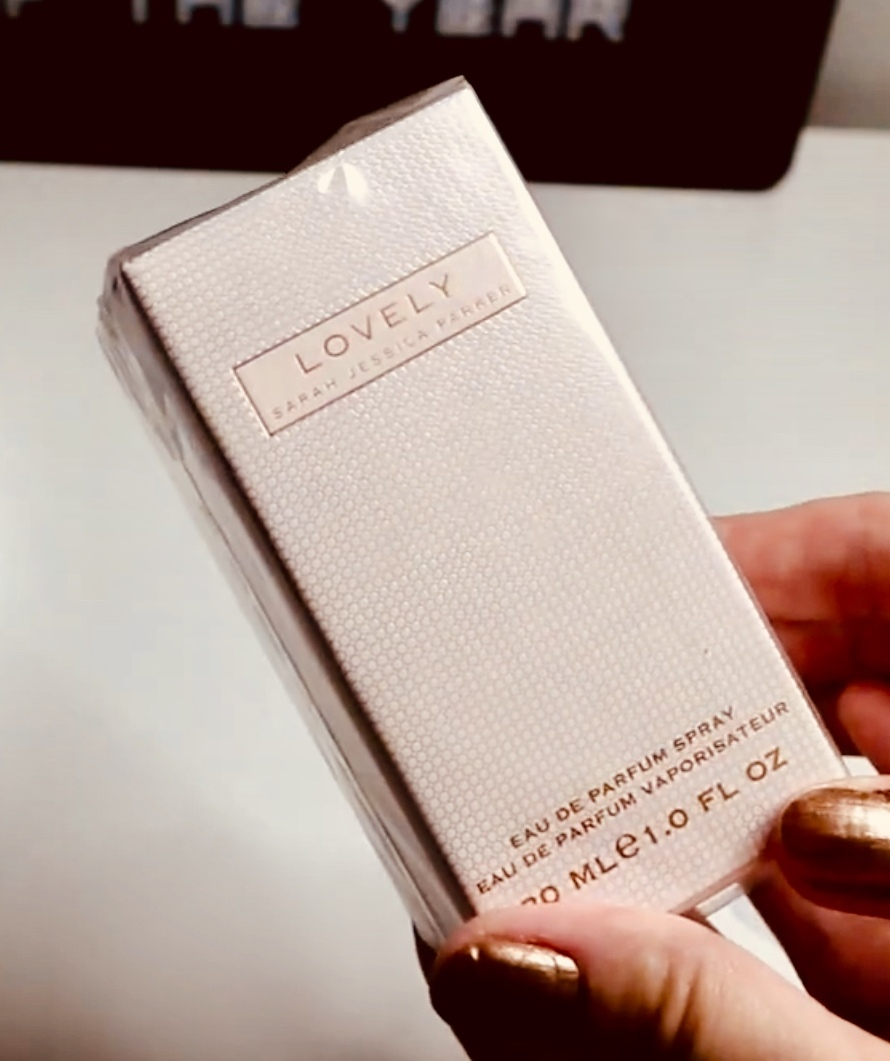
Packaging for Lovely

The original release was an eau de parfum concentration in two sizes, 50ml and 100ml, priced in the United States at $48 and $62 respectively. It was initially exclusive to the department store Nordstrom, and was also available in body lotion and shower gel forms. The scent had broadly successful launch. Parker made an appearance at department store Lord & Taylor in New York City to launch the fragrance there in September 2005; with some 2000 fans in attendance, the single-afternoon sales were reportedly $40,000, the largest beauty launch the store had seen to date. The Harvey Nichols launch Parker attended in London reportedly made $30,000 and Parker also made similar visits to San Francisco, Chicago and Toronto.

== Later ==
In 2008, Chandler Burr published a book, The Perfect Scent: A Year Behind the Scenes of the Perfume Industry in Paris and New York, which chronicled the development of Lovely, comparing it to the development of Hermès fragrance by Jean-Claude Ellena, Un Jardin sur le Nil.

Parker later released a flanker to the Lovely pillar fragrance, entitled Lovely Sheer. Created by the same perfumers who worked on the original fragrance (Gavarry and le Guernec), Lovely Sheer has notes of mandarin, bergamot, orange flower absolute, gardenia water, pink pepper, blonde woods, vetiver, musk and amber.

Ten years after the perfume's first release, Allure named Lovely to its annual "Best of Beauty" list. Parker also released a limited edition bottle on the ten-year anniversary.
