= Un Jardin sur le Nil =

Hermès perfume by Jean-Claude Ellena

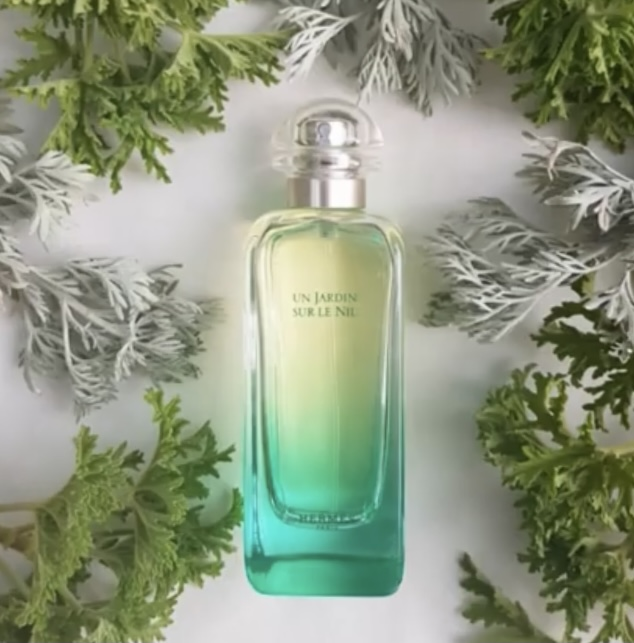

Fragrance by Jean-Claude Ellena
- Label: Hermès
- Predecessor: Un Jardin en Méditerranée
- Successor: Un Jardin après la Mousson
- Website: hermes.com

Un Jardin sur le Nil (French for "A Garden on the Nile") is a 2005 perfume created by perfumer Jean-Claude Ellena for Hermès. A unisex eau de toilette, the scent was inspired by the green mangoes Ellena smelled while walking through a grove of mangoes during a visit to the Nile.

With Sarah Jessica Parker's perfume Lovely, Jardin sur le Nil was one of two scents whose development Chandler Burr chronicled in his book The Perfect Scent: A Year Inside the Perfume Industry in Paris & New York (2008). This period marked a turning point for Hermès and the perfume industry more generally as the "noses" behind scents gained prominence beyond industry insiders: Hermès named Ellena its first in-house perfumer, responsible for Jardin sur le Nil and all subsequent Hermès fragrance releases during his 12-year tenure.

== Background ==
Jean-Claude Ellena began the Hermès "Jardin" series of fragrances in 2003 when his brief was selected from a call for proposals on the theme of the Mediterranean Sea. This resulted in the fragrance Un Jardin en Méditerranée, commissioned through Ellena's employer at the time, German fragrance firm Symrise. The next brief in the series called for a fragrance on the theme of "river". Its development represented a turning point for Hermès and the perfume industry as a whole. Ellena came on board as an in-house perfumer, reflecting a rise in the marketing of the artist behind the scent: just before joining Hermès, Ellena had created L'Eau d'Hiver for Éditions de Parfum Frédéric Malle, which distinguished itself as the first company to place the perfumer's name on the bottle, positioning the brand as an "editor" and the perfumers the true authors of the scents. Where previously these "noses" would function as a "famous ghost", in New York Times perfume critic Chandler Burr's description, known (and revered) in the industry but generally unknown to the public, with Ellena's new role at Hermès, along with his fragrance for Malle and the publicity of Burr's book, he took on a newly public role. For the brand, creating its own perfumery laboratory and naming a top-tier perfumer like Ellena to head it gave Hermès the chance to develop a new aesthetic cohesion to its collection and new credibility with consumers. Instead of licensing its name to outside fragrance firms in a process functionally no different from celebrity scents, now the whole of the creative process was conducted by Hermès.

== Fragrance ==
The perfume's concentration is eau de toilette. Inspired by Ellena’s walk through a grove of mango trees with green fruit in an island garden on the Nile (a scouting trip in search of possible ingredients around which to construct the fragrance), the final version of Jardin sur le Nil contains notes of green mango, lotus, hyacinth, grapefruit, bulrush, calamus, sycamore, and incense. It was marketed as a unisex scent and continued to draw "best of" recommendations as a fragrance for men and women years after its first release, particularly for wear in the summer. In the Los Angeles Times, Denise Hamilton described it as "The fragrance that catapulted green mango into the olfactory mainstream" with a "mouth-watering tart fruit note set noses everywhere aquiver." The perfume’s green-tinted glass bottle was also inspired by the green mango.

== The Perfect Scent ==
In 2005, Chandler Burr published a New Yorker piece describing Ellena's arrival at Hermès and the initial essais for Un Jardin sur le Nil. He expanded this into a book that tracked both Ellena's work and the team developing Sarah Jessica Parker's first fragrance, Lovely. The Perfect Scent: A Year Inside the Perfume Industry in Paris & New York was published in 2008 to favorable reviews. In a starred review, Publishers Weekly called The Perfect Scent "a thorough and often hilarious account of perfumery's colorful characters, the science and art of fragrance creation and the human experience of scent itself." It also emphasized the shift in public awareness of the craft of perfumery that began at this time: "Burr makes a strong case [...] that inviting the public behind the scenes might help to reverse the industry's declining sales."
