= Minor premiership =

Standard Australian term for the team that finishes on top of a league ladder

A minor premiership is the title given to the team which finishes a sporting competition first in the league standings after the regular season but prior to commencement of the finals in several Australian sports leagues.

== Origins ==
The etymology of the term was based on terminology in Australia from the end of the 19th century, where the regular season was referred to as the "minor rounds", and the playoffs or finals were referred to as the "major rounds" (this terminology is still used in South Australia, but has fallen into disuse in other parts of the country). Emerging from this terminology came the "minor premiership", for the top-ranked team in the minor rounds, and the "major premiership", often shortened simply to premiership, for the winner of the finals series.

The term was important in the early finals systems of the Victorian Football League, an Australian rules football league, where the minor premier had the right to a challenge match for the major premiership if it were eliminated at any stage during the finals.

== Modern usage ==
The term is used widely throughout Australian sports, and there is often a separate trophy presented for it. The National Rugby League awards the J. J. Giltinan Shield, the Australian Ice Hockey League awards the H. Newman Reid Trophy and the Australian Football League from 1991 to 2022 awarded the Dr Wm. C. McClelland Trophy. The National Basketball League recognises the minor premiers but no official trophy or award is given.

The term is not generally used in Australian association football competitions; leagues the A-League refer to the "minor premiership" as the "premiership", and the "major premiership" as the "championship", more closely matching European association football terminology than general Australian terminology.

The concept of a recognising and rewarding the leading club at the end of the regular season is common in many sports throughout the world, but the term "minor premiership" remains a uniquely Australasian term.

== Other examples around the world ==
Many other sports worldwide have a form of minor premiership title awarded to a top ranking team or competitor in a regular season.

- Super League = League Leader's Shield
- Major League Soccer = Supporters Shield
- National Basketball Association = Maurice Podoloff Trophy
- National Hockey League = President's Trophy
- NASCAR = Regular Season Championship
- Supercars = Sprint Cup Championship
