= The Last Wish (band) =

American rock band

- Origin: Houston, Texas
- Genres: Rock
- Years active: 1989–1995
- Past members: Justin Furstenfeld; Amy Immel; Katie Hartzog; Michelle Trautwein; Greg Hammond; Leital Molad; Brady Hammond; Abraham Diaz

The Last Wish was a rock band from Houston, Texas, noted for being the first band of Blue October frontman Justin Furstenfeld. Ryan Delahoussaye of Blue October played with The Last Wish at a couple shows, but he was never a member of the band. Song writing collaboration was often shared by Greg Hammond, Amy Immel and Justin Furstenfeld. The members of the band attended Bellaire High School, and HSPVA, and the group was started while the members were students. The band developed a sizable following in Houston, where they performed at venues like Zelda's, Fitzgerald's, Toads Tavern, Last Concert Café, Café Artiste, McGonigel's Mucky Duck, and The Abyss on several occasions to packed houses. Furstenfeld left the group in 1995 while they were working on their third album. Furstenfeld still plays Last Wish songs during his solo shows, and Blue October has played Last Wish songs on occasion.

The band released two albums, and a vinyl single which included the songs "Black Orchid", "Go On" and "Goodbye". "Black Orchid" appeared on Blue October's album, The Answers, in 1998 and on Furstenfeld's 2014 album, Songs from an Open Book. A third album by The Last Wish was in the works, but the band broke up before it was finished.

== Members ==
- Justin Furstenfeld (vocals, guitar)
- Amy Immel (vocals)
- Katie Hartzog (violin)
- Michelle Trautwein (cello)
- Greg Hammond (guitar)
- Leital Molad (bass)
- Brady Hammond (drums)
- Abraham Diaz

== Discography ==
- 1993 Rooftop Sessions
- 1995 The First of February
