= Regis High School (Iowa) =

Coordinates: 42.002°N 91.647°W

Regis Middle School

Location
- 735 Prairie Drive NE; Cedar Rapids, Iowa; United States

Information
- School type: Private, Middle Catholic
- Religious affiliation: Roman Catholic
- Opened: 2000
- Principal: Zach Zeckser
- Colours: Red and Gold

Regis Catholic Middle School is a Catholic school in Cedar Rapids, Iowa , located at 735 Prairie Drive NE. It opened in the year 2000.

Formerly a Catholic high school opened in 1958 as a successor to Immaculate Conception High School, it drew students from the parishes of All Saints, Immaculate Conception, St. Joseph (Marion), St. Matthew, St. Pius X, and St. Wenceslaus. That school merged with LaSalle High School to form Xavier High School in 1998.

== Notable alumni ==
- Kurt Warner ('89), NFL quarterback, 1999 Super Bowl MVP
- Zach Johnson ('94) PGA Tour golfer
- J. Paul Oetken, Judge of the United States District Court for the Southern District of New York
