= The First =

The First or The 1st may refer to:

== Arts and entertainment ==
=== Albums ===
- The 1st (album), by Willow, 2017
- The First (Shinee album), 2011
- The First (single album), by NCT Dream, 2017

=== Television ===
- The First TV, an American conservative opinion network
- The First (TV series), an American-British drama television series
- The First Evil, a fictional character in the television series Buffy the Vampire Slayer usually called The First

=== Other arts and entertainment ===
- The First (musical), a 1981 musical by Robert Brush and Martin Charnin

== See also ==
- Category:Lists of firsts
- First (disambiguation)
- First man (disambiguation)
- First woman (disambiguation)
- La 1ère (disambiguation) (French: La Première, lit. 'The First')
- The One (disambiguation)
- Das Erste, the flagship public television channel in Germany
- Lupin III: The First, a 2019 Japanese animated film
- The First 48, an American documentary television series
