= Preliminary =

Preliminary may refer to:

- Preliminary internships
- Preliminary English Test
- Preliminary finals
- Preliminary hearing
- Preliminary Notice

== See also ==
- Preliminary examination (disambiguation)
