= First Things First =

First Things First may refer to:

- First Things First (album), by Bob Bennett
- First Things First (1994 book), a self-help book by Stephen Covey and A. Roger and Rebecca R. Merrill
- First Things First (2019 book), a free speech textbook by Ronald K.L. Collins, Will Creeley, and David L. Hudson Jr.
- First Things First 1964 manifesto, a statement concerning graphic design
- First Things First 2000 manifesto, an updated version of the above
- First Things First Foundation, a U.S. Christian organization
- "First Things First", a 1956 poem by W. H. Auden, which closes with the oft-quoted line "Thousands have lived without love, not one without water."
- "First Things First", a song by Neon Trees on their album Pop Psychology
- First Things First (talk show), a talk show on FS1.
