= Terre d'Hermès =

Men's fragrance

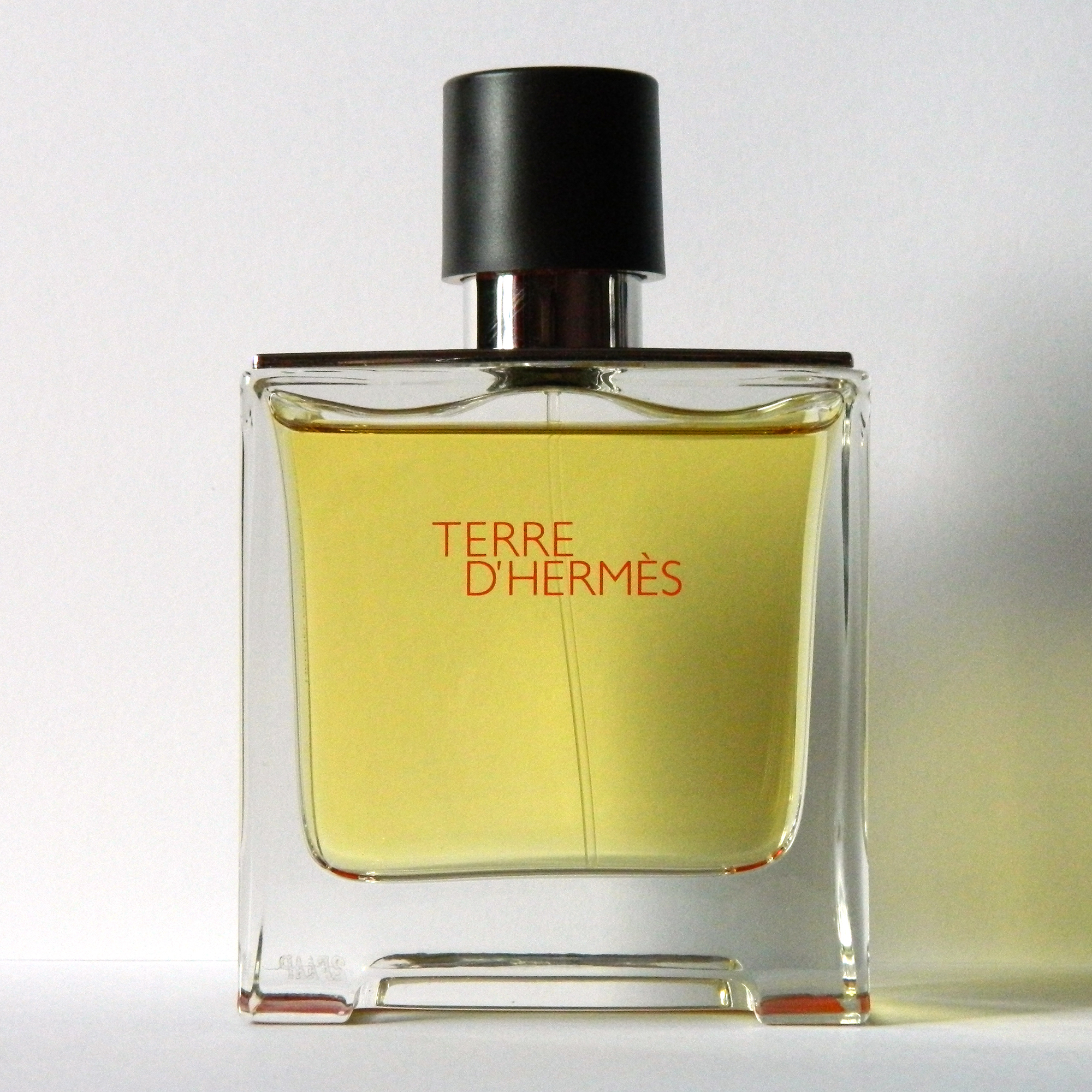

Fragrance by Hermès
- Top notes: Orange; grapefruit
- Heart notes: Pepper; pelargonium
- Base notes: Patchouli; cedar; vetiver; benzoin
- Released: 2006
- Website: Terre d'Hermès

Terre d'Hermès is a fragrance launched by French luxury brand Hermès in March 2006. It was created by Jean-Claude Ellena, who was the exclusive in-house perfumer of Hermès.

== Overview ==
Jean Claude Ellena, who was formerly the master perfumier for Hermès, claims that his inspiration for Terre d'Hermès was French author Jean Giono, who, Ellena claims "He is a man who loves the richness of nature".

As a result of this, many of the scents found within the fragrance are vegetal and mineral based, including Cedar, Patchouli and Vetiver. Ellena would also state that he decided not to use any Musk notes within the fragrance, as "Musk creates a mask on the skin", stating that his reasoning for not including this mask was to create a fragrance which was unique to each wearer.

== Variations ==
Originally released as an Eau de Toilette, Terre d'Hermès was reinterpreted as a Pure Parfum which was released in 2009, this was subsequently followed by a Tres Fraiche version 2014. In 2018, a new variation called Eau Intense Vétiver, created by Christine Nagel was released, and was described as being fresher than the original. Terre d'Hermès Eau Givrée Eau de Parfum was released in 2022 with main notes such as citron, timut pepper and juniper berries. The newest one is Terre d'Hermes Eau de Parfum Intense, released in 2025. Top notes are Bergamot and Black Pepper; middle notes are Coffee and Licorice; base notes are Woody Notes, Lava and Stone. The original Terre d'Hermès and the Parfum versions were designed by Jean-Claude Ellena, and the rest were designed by Christine Nagel.

== Scent ==
Terre d'Hermès is a fruity-spicy-woody fragrance, meaning it features fruity top notes, in this case Orange and Grapefruit, its middle or heart notes are of pepper and its woody base notes, include cedar, patchouli and vetiver.

Terre d'Hermès Note Pyramid
Top	Orange		Grapefruit	
Middle	Pepper	Pelargonium	Flint	
Base	Patchouli	Cedar	Vetiver	Benzoin

== Reviews ==
Terre d'Hermès ratings
Basenotes	4/5 stars
Fragrantica	4.25/5 stars
John Lewis	4.5/5 stars
Nordstrom	5/5 stars

Terre d'Hermès garnered generally favorable reviews from critics and the general public alike. The eau de toilette has a rating of 4 out of 5 stars on the fragrance website Basenotes based on an average of over 2000 votes, whilst the pure parfum distillation has a rating of 4.5 stars out of 5 across an average of 316 votes. Luca Turin rated it three out of five stars.

== Awards ==
Terre d'Hermès won the Men's Fragrance of the Year - Luxe award at the 2007 FiFi Awards, and also won Best Classic (Men's) Fragrance for 2012 from Basenotes. Terre d'Hermès won a variety of awards from GQ magazine, including 'Launch of the decade' and the Readers Favourite fragrance in 2009. It was named Best Classic Fragrance from ShortList magazine.
