= Premier League (disambiguation) =

The Premier League is the top football division in England. It may also refer to multiple other professional sport leagues:

== Basketball ==
- Bahraini Premier League (basketball)
- Egyptian Basketball Premier League
- Israeli Basketball Premier League
- Jordanian Premier Basketball League
- Premier Basketball League
- Premier League (Australia)
- Premier League (Iceland)
- Saudi Premier League (basketball)

== Cricket ==
- Bangladesh Premier League
- Caribbean Premier League
- English Premier League (cricket)
- Indian Premier League
- Lanka Premier League
- Sri Lanka Premier League
- Tamil Nadu Premier League

== Association football ==
- Armenian Premier League
- Azerbaijan Premier League
- Bahraini Premier League
- Belarusian Premier League
- Bangladesh Premier League
- Premier League of Belize
- Bengal Premier League Soccer
- Premier League of Bosnia and Herzegovina
- Botswana Premier League
- Burundi Premier League
- Canadian Premier League
- Crimean Premier League
- Dhivehi Premier League
- Egyptian Premier League
- Ethiopian Premier League
- Faroe Islands Premier League
- Fiji Premier League
- German Premier League: Bundesliga
- Ghana Premier League
- Hong Kong Premier League
- Indonesian Premier League
- Italian Premier League: Lega Serie A
- Liga Primer Indonesia
- League of Ireland Premier Division
- Israeli Premier League
- Jamaica Premier League
- Kyrgyz Premier League
- Kazakhstan Premier League
- Kenyan Premier League
- Kuwaiti Premier League
- Lebanese Premier League
- Malaysia Premier League
- Maltese Premier League
- Mongolian Premier League
- National Premier Leagues (Australia)
- NIFL Premiership (Northern Ireland)
- Nigeria Premier League
- North Korea Premier League
- Pakistan Premier League
- Primeira Liga (Portugal)
- Premier League Soccer (India)
- Premier Soccer League (South Africa)
- Russian Premier League
- Saudi Premier League
- Singapore Premier League
- Scottish Football League Premier Division (1975–1998)
- Scottish Premier League (1998–2013)
- Scottish Premiership (2013–present)
- South Sudan Premier League
- Spanish Premier League: La Liga
- Sri Lanka Football Premier League
- Sudan Premier League
- Syrian Premier League
- Taiwan Football Premier League
- Tajik Premier League
- Tanzanian Premier League
- Thai Premier League
- Ugandan Premier League
- Ukrainian Premier League
- Welsh Premier League
- Yemen Premier League
- Zambia Premier League
- Zimbabwe Premier League

== Field Hockey League ==
- Hockey India League
- Premier Hockey League (South Africa)

== Rugby league ==
- New South Wales Cup, formerly known as the NSWRL Premier League

== Rugby union ==
- Premiership Rugby
- Rugby Premier League

== Speedway ==
- Premier League (speedway)

== Snooker ==
- Premier League Snooker

== Darts ==
- Premier League Darts

== See also ==
- 1st Division (disambiguation)
- First League (disambiguation)
- Premiership (disambiguation)
- Première Ligue, the top tier women's association football league in France
