= Kurt Warner =

American football player (born 1971)

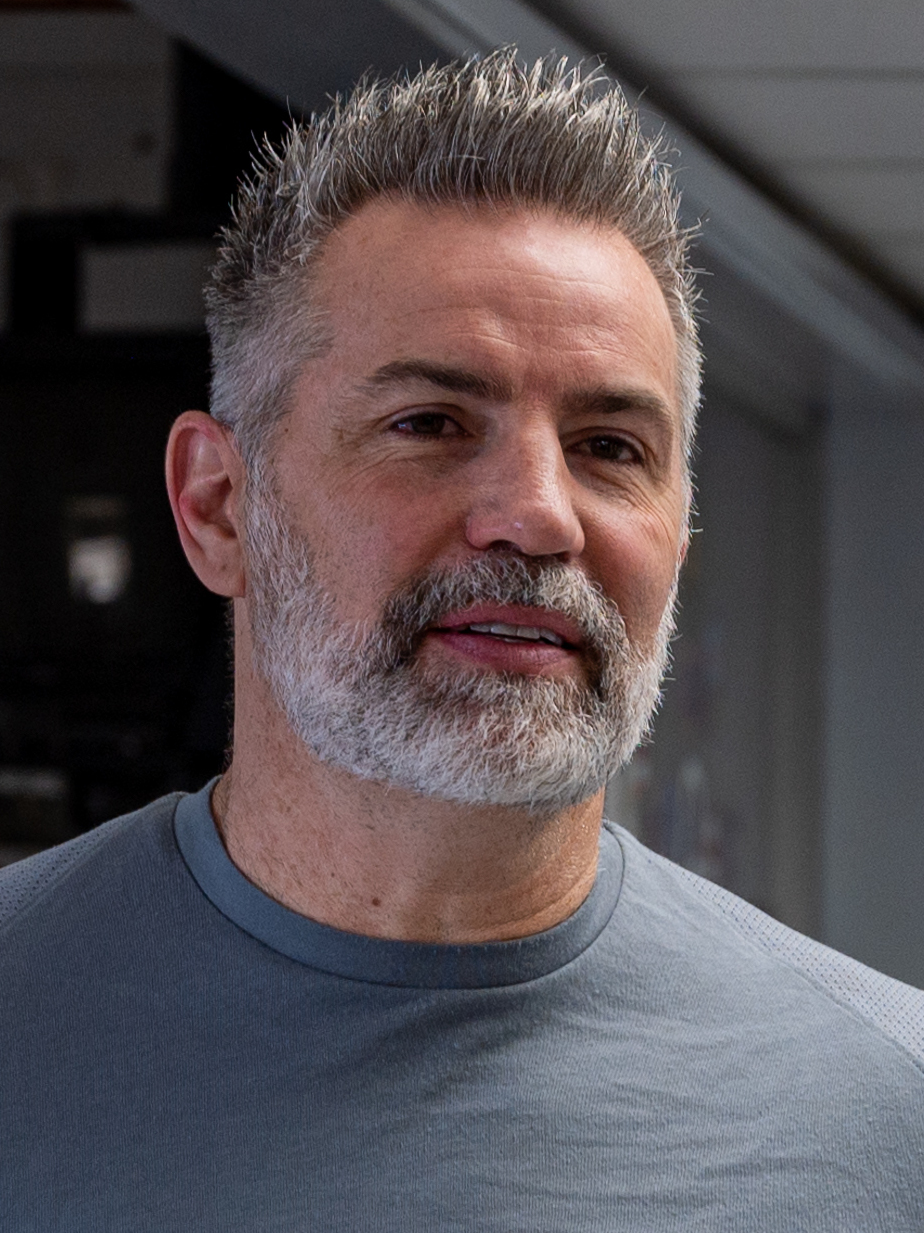
- Warner in 2022

No. 10, 13
- Position: Quarterback

Personal information
- Born: June 22, 1971 (age 55); Burlington, Iowa, U.S.
- Listed height: 6 ft 2 in (1.88 m)
- Listed weight: 214 lb (97 kg)

Career information
- High school: Regis (Cedar Rapids, Iowa)
- College: Northern Iowa (1989–1993)
- NFL draft: 1994: undrafted

Career history

Playing
- Green Bay Packers (1994)*; Iowa Barnstormers (1995–1997); St. Louis Rams (1998–2003); → Amsterdam Admirals (1998); New York Giants (2004); Arizona Cardinals (2005–2009)
- * Offseason or practice squad member only

Coaching
- Northern Iowa (1994) Graduate assistant

Awards and highlights
- Super Bowl champion (XXXIV); Super Bowl MVP (XXXIV); 2× NFL Most Valuable Player (1999, 2001); Walter Payton NFL Man of the Year (2008); 2× First-team All-Pro (1999, 2001); 4× Pro Bowl (1999–2001, 2008); 2× NFL passing touchdowns leader (1999, 2001); 3× NFL completion percentage leader (1999–2001); 2× NFL passer rating leader (1999, 2001); NFL passing yards leader (2001); Arizona Cardinals Ring of Honor; The Sporting News Athlete of the Year (2000) (Note: Shared with Marshall Faulk.); GFC Offensive Player of the Year (1993); First-team All-GFC (1993); NFL records: Most touchdown passes in a single postseason: 11 (2008) (tied with Joe Flacco, Patrick Mahomes, Joe Montana); Career passing yards per game, playoffs: 304.0; Highest rate of games with 300+ yards passing (min. 100 games played): 41.9%; AFL: 2× First-team All-Arena (1996, 1997); Arena Football Hall of Fame; Iowa Barnstormers No. 13 retired; Iowa Barnstormers Hall of Fame

Career NFL statistics
- Passing attempts: 4,070
- Passing completions: 2,666
- Completion percentage: 65.5%
- TD–INT: 208–128
- Passing yards: 32,344
- Passer rating: 93.7
- Stats at Pro Football Reference

Career AFL statistics
- Completion percentage: 62.0%
- TD–INT: 183–43
- Passing yards: 10,465
- Passer rating: 107.84
- Stats at ArenaFan.com
- Pro Football Hall of Fame

Kurtis Eugene Warner (born June 22, 1971) is an American former professional football quarterback who played in the National Football League (NFL) for 12 seasons, primarily with the St. Louis Rams and Arizona Cardinals. His career, which saw him ascend from an undrafted free agent to a two-time Most Valuable Player and Super Bowl MVP, is widely regarded as one of the greatest Cinderella stories in NFL history.

After playing college football for the Northern Iowa Panthers from 1990 to 1993, Warner spent four years without being named to an NFL roster. He was signed by the Green Bay Packers in 1994, but released before the regular season and instead played three seasons for the Iowa Barnstormers of the Arena Football League (AFL). Warner landed his first NFL roster spot in 1998 with the Rams, holding a backup position until he was thrust into becoming St. Louis's starter the following season. During his first season as an NFL starting quarterback, Warner led The Greatest Show on Turf offense to the Rams' first Super Bowl title in Super Bowl XXXIV, earning him league and Super Bowl MVP honors. He won his second league MVP award two years later en route to an appearance in Super Bowl XXXVI. Released from St. Louis in 2004 amid a performance decline, Warner spent one season with the New York Giants before revitalizing his career in Arizona. His most successful season with the Cardinals was in 2008 when he led them to the franchise's first Super Bowl appearance in Super Bowl XLIII.

Considered the NFL's greatest undrafted player, Warner is the only undrafted player to be named NFL MVP and Super Bowl MVP and the only undrafted quarterback to lead his team to a Super Bowl victory. He was also the first quarterback to win a Super Bowl during his first season as the primary starter. Warner was inducted to the Pro Football Hall of Fame in 2017. He is the only player inducted to both the Pro Football Hall of Fame and the Arena Football Hall of Fame.

== Early life ==
Kurtis Eugene Warner was born on June 22, 1971, in Burlington, Iowa. Warner played high school football at Regis High School in Cedar Rapids, Iowa, graduating in 1989.

== College career ==
After high school, Warner attended the University of Northern Iowa, graduating in 1993. At UNI, he was third on the Panthers' depth chart until his senior year. When Warner was finally given the chance to start, he was named the Gateway Conference's Offensive Player of the Year and first-team all-conference.

== Professional career ==
Pre-draft measurables
| Height | Weight | Hand span | 40-yard dash |
|---|---|---|---|
| 6 ft 1 5/8 in (1.87 m) | 201 lb (91 kg) | 10 1/4 in (0.26 m) | 4.95 s |
All values from scouting report/pre-draft

=== Green Bay Packers ===
Following his college career, Warner went undrafted in the 1994 NFL draft. He was invited to try out for the Green Bay Packers' training camp in 1994, but was released before the regular season began. Warner was competing for a spot against Brett Favre, Mark Brunell, and former Heisman Trophy winner Ty Detmer. While Warner was with the Packers, the head coach was Mike Holmgren, the quarterback coach was Steve Mariucci, and Andy Reid was the offensive assistant.

In 1994, after his release, Warner stocked shelves and faced products at a Hy-Vee grocery store in Cedar Falls for $5.50 an hour. He worked night shifts from around 9:30 or 10 p.m. until around 4 or 5 a.m. so he could work out and train during the day. Warner often cites this starting point when telling of his rise to NFL stardom in 1999. He also mentions that his deepened dedication to Christianity occurred around 1997. Warner returned to Northern Iowa and worked as a graduate assistant coach with the football team, while still hoping to get another tryout with an NFL team.

=== Iowa Barnstormers ===
With no NFL teams willing to give him a chance, Warner turned to the Arena Football League (AFL) in 1995 and signed with the Iowa Barnstormers. He was named to the AFL's First-team All-Arena in both 1996 and 1997 after he led the Barnstormers to ArenaBowl appearances in both seasons. Warner's performance was so impressive that he was later named twelfth out of the 20 Best Arena Football Players of all time.

Before the 1997 NFL season, Warner requested and got a tryout with the Chicago Bears, but an injury to his throwing elbow caused by an unknown insect bite sustained during his honeymoon prevented him from attending. In 2000, after Warner's breakout NFL season, the AFL used his new fame for the name of its first widely available video game, Kurt Warner's Arena Football Unleashed. Years later, on August 12, 2011, he would be inducted into the Arena Football Hall of Fame.

=== St. Louis Rams ===
==== Amsterdam Admirals ====
In December 1997 after the St. Louis Rams' season ended, Warner signed a future contract with the team. In February 1998, he was allocated to NFL Europe to play for the Amsterdam Admirals, where he led the league in touchdowns and passing yards. His backup at the time was future Carolina Panthers quarterback Jake Delhomme. Returning to the United States, Warner spent the 1998 season as St. Louis's third-string quarterback behind Tony Banks and Steve Bono, beating out former Virginia Tech quarterback Will Furrer. He ended his season completing only 4 of 11 pass attempts for 39 yards and a 47.2 quarterback rating.

==== 1999 season ====
Prior to the 1999 free-agency period, the Rams chose Warner to be one of the team's five unprotected players in the 1999 NFL expansion draft. Warner went unselected by the Cleveland Browns, who chose no Rams and whose only quarterback selection was Scott Milanovich. Warner and the Rams had feared his being selected by the Browns upon learning the Browns hired John Hufnagel for their coaching staff, as Hufnagel had been a rival coach from Warner's Arena League days.

The Rams let Bono leave in free agency and signed Trent Green to be the starter. Banks was traded to the Ravens, and Warner now found himself second on the depth chart. After Green suffered a torn ACL via a low hit by Rodney Harrison in a preseason game, Rams coach Dick Vermeil named Warner as the Rams' starter. In an emotional press conference, Vermeil—who had not seen Warner work with the first-string offense—said, "We will rally around Kurt Warner, and we'll play good football." With the support of running back Marshall Faulk and wide receivers Isaac Bruce, Torry Holt, Az-Zahir Hakim, and Ricky Proehl, Warner put together one of the top seasons by a quarterback in NFL history, throwing for 4,353 yards with 41 touchdown passes and a completion rate of 65.1%. The Rams' high-powered offense, run by offensive coordinator Mike Martz, was nicknamed "The Greatest Show on Turf" and registered the first in a string of three consecutive 500-point seasons, an NFL record.

Warner threw three touchdown passes in each of his first three NFL starts, an NFL record until it was surpassed by Patrick Mahomes in 2018. Warner drew more attention in the Rams' fourth game of the season, a home game against the San Francisco 49ers (who had been NFC West division champions for 12 of the previous 13 seasons). The Rams lost their last 17 meetings with the 49ers, but Warner proceeded to throw a touchdown pass on each of the Rams' first three possessions of the game, and four touchdowns in the first half alone, to propel the Rams to a 28–10 halftime lead on the way to a 42–20 victory. Warner finished the game with five touchdown passes, giving him 14 in four games and the Rams a 4–0 record. Warner's breakout season from a career in anonymity was so unexpected that Sports Illustrated featured him on their October 18 cover with the caption "Who Is This Guy?" He was named the 1999 NFL MVP at the season's end for leading the Rams to their first playoff berth since 1989 (when they were still in Los Angeles) and their first division title since 1985.

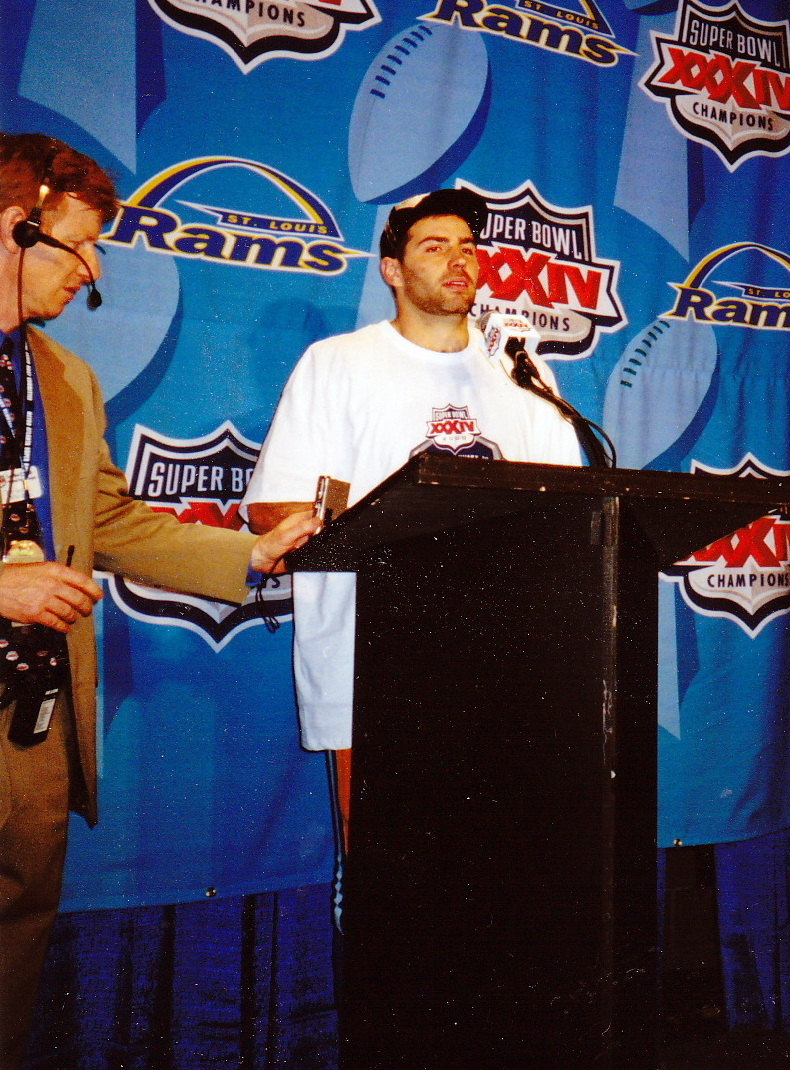
Warner at post-game press conference for Super Bowl XXXIV

In the playoffs, Warner and the Rams defeated the Minnesota Vikings 49–37 in the Divisional Round and the Tampa Bay Buccaneers 11–6 in the NFC Championship Game before ultimately winning Super Bowl XXXIV against the Tennessee Titans 23–16. In the game, he threw for two touchdowns and a then Super Bowl-record 414 passing yards, including a 73-yard touchdown to Isaac Bruce when the game was tied with just over two minutes to play, which proved to be the game-winning score. Warner also set a Super Bowl record by attempting 45 passes without a single interception. For his performance, Warner was awarded the Super Bowl MVP award. Warner was the last player to win both the NFL MVP and Super Bowl MVP in the same year until Patrick Mahomes did so in Super Bowl LVII in the 2022 NFL season.

==== 2000 season ====
On July 21, Warner signed a seven-year contract worth $47 million. He started the 2000 season where he had left off in his record-setting 1999 season, racking up 300 or more passing yards in each of his first six games (tying Steve Young's record) and posting 19 touchdown passes in that stretch. Warner broke his hand and missed the middle of the season, but Trent Green filled in ably and the Warner/Green duo led the Rams to the highest team passing yard total in NFL history, with 5,232 net yards. Warner and Green's combined gross passing yards total was 5,492. In contrast to his previous season, however, Warner's turnover rate drastically increased in 2000, as he threw an interception in 5.2% of his attempts (compared to just 2.6% in 1999). Despite one of the most productive offensive years by an NFL team, the Rams won only ten games and lost in the wild card round to the New Orleans Saints 31–28. In response to the disappointing season, the Rams cut nine of their eleven defensive starters during the offseason, and Trent Green was traded to the Kansas City Chiefs.

==== 2001 season ====
Warner returned to MVP form in 2001. Although his performance lagged behind his 1999 performance, he amassed a league-high 36 touchdown passes and 4,830 passing yards, and another league high mark in passer rating (101.4). Warner's tendency for turnovers carried over from 2000, as he tossed a career-high 22 interceptions (despite completing a career-high 68.7% of his passes), but he still led "The Greatest Show on Turf" to its third consecutive 6–0 start (becoming the first NFL team to do so, later equaled by the 2005–2007 Indianapolis Colts), an NFL-best 14–2 record, and an appearance in Super Bowl XXXVI. Warner was also named the NFL MVP for the second time in three seasons, giving the Rams their third winner in as many years (running back Marshall Faulk won in 2000).

In Super Bowl XXXVI, Warner threw for 365 yards (then the second-highest, now the sixth-highest total in Super Bowl history) and a passing touchdown along with a rushing touchdown, but his rhythm was disrupted by New England Patriots head coach Bill Belichick's defensive game plan and he tossed two costly interceptions which helped stake the heavy-underdog Patriots to a two-touchdown lead. After falling behind to the Patriots 17–3, though, the Rams rallied to tie the game late in the fourth quarter on a one-yard Warner quarterback sneak touchdown run and a 26-yard touchdown pass from Warner to Ricky Proehl. The game ended in a 20–17 loss for Warner and the Rams when Patriots kicker Adam Vinatieri kicked a game-winning field goal as time expired, giving the Patriots the first of three Super Bowl wins in four years.

==== 2002–2003 seasons ====
Warner began the 2002 season as the Rams' starter, but he played poorly, throwing seven interceptions against only one touchdown as the team went 0–3. In the Rams' week 4 game against the Dallas Cowboys, Warner broke a finger on his throwing hand. Warner attempted to come back later in the season, but his injury allowed him to play only two more games (both losses). In contrast to his 103.0 career passer rating entering the season, Warner posted a minuscule 67.4 rating in 2002.

The following season, Warner was replaced as the Rams' starting quarterback for good after fumbling six times in the team's opening-day game against the New York Giants. Warner later revealed that he had previously broken his hand and that it had not fully healed, making it more difficult to grip the football. His successor as the Rams' starting quarterback, Marc Bulger (another relatively unheralded quarterback coming out of college), stepped into the breach and played reasonably well upon replacing Warner.

The Rams signed veteran Chris Chandler as Bulger's backup. The Rams released Warner on June 1, 2004, with three years left on his contract.

=== New York Giants ===
Two days after his release from the Rams, he signed a one-year, $3 million deal with the New York Giants, with a second year player option worth $6 million. Warner started the 2004 season as the Giants' starting quarterback, winning five of his first seven games, but following a two-game losing streak, highly touted rookie quarterback Eli Manning was given the starting job in a decision made by Tom Coughlin not based on Warner's play. The Giants had a 5–4 win–loss record at the time of Warner's benching. Warner made a spot appearance at the end of a Giants blowout loss against the Baltimore Ravens, and it was Warner who advised Coughlin to go to the media and say that Manning was still the starter for the team. It was the last appearance for Warner as a Giant. Ultimately, New York finished at 6–10 (going only 1–6 under Manning). Following the season, Warner chose to void the second year of his contract, and thus became a free agent.

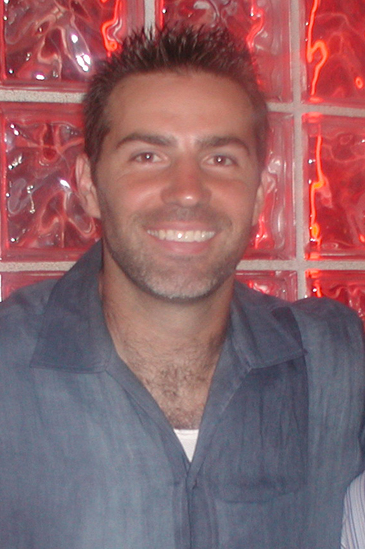
Warner in October 2004

=== Arizona Cardinals ===
==== 2005 season ====
In early 2005, Warner signed a one-year, $4-million contract with the Arizona Cardinals, and was quickly named the starter by coach Dennis Green. Warner posted three relatively mediocre performances before injuring his groin and being replaced by former starter Josh McCown. McCown performed well enough in the two games Warner missed that McCown remained the starter.

After McCown struggled in two straight games, Green re-inserted Warner into the starting line-up. After playing fairly well in two consecutive losses (passing for a total of nearly 700 yards), Warner defeated his former team, the St. Louis Rams, by a score of 38–28. He passed for 285 yards and three touchdowns while posting a quarterback rating of 115.9. Warner's season ended in week 15 when he partially tore his MCL.

Warner signed a new three-year extension with the Cardinals on February 14, 2006. The deal had a base salary of $18 million and, with performance incentives, could have been worth as much as $24 million.

==== 2006 season ====
In week 1 of the 2006 NFL season, Warner won the NFC Offensive Player of the Week award, throwing for 301 yards and three touchdowns in a win over the San Francisco 49ers. Two weeks later, Warner passed the 20,000-yard passing milestone in his 76th game, the second-quickest of any player in NFL history (Warner accomplished the feat in one game more than it took record-holder Dan Marino).

After three subpar games in Weeks 2–4, Warner was replaced as quarterback by rookie Matt Leinart in the fourth quarter of week 4. Head coach Dennis Green stated that Warner would be the backup quarterback for the remainder of the season. In week 16, Leinart went down with a shoulder injury against the 49ers, forcing Warner to see his first action since week 4. Warner filled in nicely, as he was able to hang on for the Cardinals win. In week 17 against the San Diego Chargers, Warner started again in place of the injured Leinart, throwing for 365 yards (which led the NFL for that week) and a touchdown, though the Chargers were able to hold on for a 27–20 win.

==== 2007 season ====
Leinart was given the starting quarterback job at the start of the 2007 season. However, in the third game of the season, against the Baltimore Ravens, Warner came off the bench to relieve an ineffective Leinart during the 4th quarter with the Ravens leading 23–6 at the beginning of the quarter. Warner led a furious comeback, as he completed 15 of 20 passes for 258 yards and 2 touchdowns. This brought Arizona to a tie game (23–23), though Arizona would go on to lose the game 26–23 after Baltimore kicked a last-second field goal.

On September 30, 2007, during the week four game against the Pittsburgh Steelers, Warner relieved Leinart again, following another ineffective start. Warner finished with 14 completed of 21 attempts for 132 yards with one touchdown pass and no interceptions, while Leinart re-entered the game in the 4th quarter and led the Cardinals to their final touchdown. After Leinart was placed on injured reserve, Warner was named starter for the remainder of the 2007 season.

Warner passed for a career-high 484 yards against the San Francisco 49ers in a 37–31 loss on November 25, but had a fumble in the end zone in overtime that was recovered by Tully Banta-Cain, and the Cardinals lost. However, the following week Warner improved; and the Cardinals earned a victory over the Cleveland Browns that brought the Cardinals to 6–6 and kept them in the chase for the NFC Wild Card playoff spot. Warner finished the 2007 season with 27 passing touchdowns, just one shy of the Cardinals franchise record.

==== 2008 season ====
Leinart was named the Cardinals' starting quarterback going into the 2008 off-season, but Ken Whisenhunt stated that it would be very possible for Warner to be the starter before week one of the regular season. Indeed, Warner was named the starter on August 30, 2008. That season, Warner had 4,583 passing yards, 30 touchdowns, and a completion percentage of 67.1%. He was the top ranked passer in the National Football Conference for the third time, and only trailed Philip Rivers and Chad Pennington of the AFC in NFL passer rating for the season. Warner also received FedEx Air Player of the Week honors for his performance during weeks 9 and 11 of the season. He had his struggles during the season, as in week 3 of the season versus the New York Jets, his team turned the ball over 7 times. This included an interception for a touchdown, and two interceptions resulting in a touchdown and a field goal in just the second quarter. Warner still managed to get his team to score 35 points in a 56–35 loss.

On December 7, 2008, Warner led the Cardinals to a 34–10 win over his former team, the St. Louis Rams, securing for the Cardinals the NFC West Division title and their first playoff berth since 1998. It was the Cardinals' first division title since 1975 (when they were in St. Louis) and third of the post-merger era. As a result, the Cardinals earned a home playoff game, only their second ever, and their first in Arizona. (Despite winning division titles in the 1974 and 1975 seasons in St. Louis, the Cardinals played on the road in the playoffs as a result of the playoff structure in those days.) On December 16, 2008, Warner was named the starting quarterback for the NFC team in the 2009 Pro Bowl.

===== 2008 postseason =====
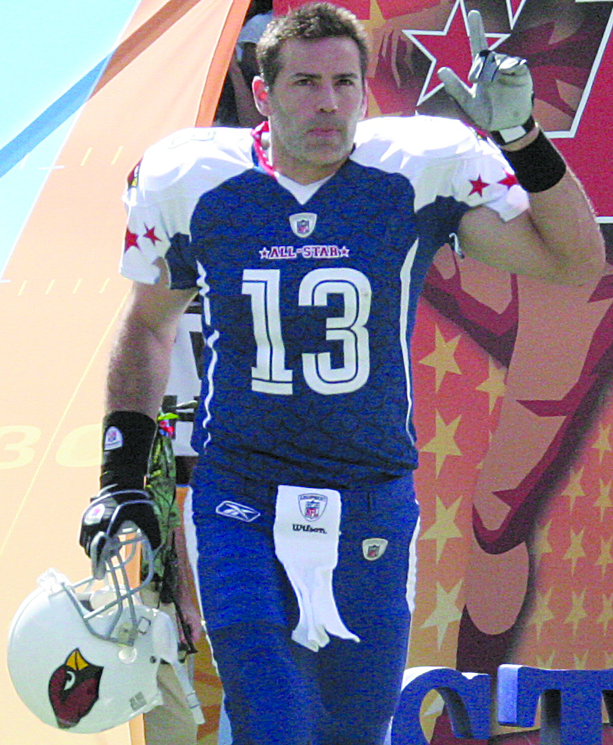
Warner at the 2009 Pro Bowl

On January 3, 2009, Warner led the Cardinals in their victory over the Atlanta Falcons 30–24 at home in the Wild Card Round of the playoffs. During the game Warner went 19 for 32 passing, a completion percentage of 59.4%, for 271 yards. He threw two touchdowns and one interception.

On January 10, Warner helped the Cardinals defeat the Carolina Panthers 33–13 in Charlotte, North Carolina in the Divisional Round of the playoffs. During the game Warner went 21 for 32 passing, for 220 yards, a completion percentage of 65.6%, with two touchdowns and one interception. This win was the first time the Cardinals had won a game on the East Coast the entire 2008 season, after having lost away games to the Panthers, Washington Redskins, Philadelphia Eagles, New York Jets, and the New England Patriots.

On January 18, Warner threw for 279 yards, four touchdowns, and no interceptions against the Philadelphia Eagles in the NFC Championship to lead the Cardinals to their first Super Bowl appearance in history. Warner became the second quarterback to start a Super Bowl with multiple teams and first since Craig Morton (Warner has since been joined by Peyton Manning and Tom Brady).

In Warner's third career Super Bowl appearance on February 1, the Cardinals lost Super Bowl XLIII 27–23 to the Pittsburgh Steelers, leaving him with a career 1–2 record in Super Bowls. Despite losing, Warner still managed to throw for 377 yards (the fourth-highest total in Super Bowl history as of 2026). He completed 72.1% of his passes, and had a quarterback rating of 112.3. Warner had thus recorded the three highest single-game passing yardage totals in Super Bowl history up to that point, and joined Roger Staubach, Terry Bradshaw, Joe Montana, John Elway, Tom Brady, and Patrick Mahomes as the only quarterbacks to throw a touchdown pass in three Super Bowls. Warner took his team to the Super Bowl every year that he played as the starting quarterback during all regular and post season games.

==== 2009 season ====
Warner announced his desire to return to the Cardinals for the 2009 season. The Cardinals offered him a two-year contract worth around $20 million but Warner was looking for a contract that would pay him about $14 million a year and the two sides could not come to an agreement. On February 27, 2009, Warner became a free agent and went on to have talks with the San Francisco 49ers. The 49ers offered Warner a contract worth more than that offered by the Cardinals. On March 4, Warner re-signed with the Cardinals to a two-year deal worth $23 million total, $4 million for each of the next two years, with a $15 million signing bonus, and $19 million guaranteed. Warner underwent arthroscopic hip surgery to repair a torn labrum on March 17, 2009. On September 20, 2009, Warner broke the NFL's single-game record for completion percentage in the regular season, completing 24 of 26 passing for 243 yards and two touchdowns in a 31–17 win against the Jacksonville Jaguars. Warner's 92.3% completion rate broke the previous NFL record set by Vinny Testaverde in 1993.

On November 1, 2009, Warner threw a career-high-equaling five interceptions during a loss to the Carolina Panthers. During the same game Warner became the first quarterback in the NFL to throw for over 14,000 yards with two teams. On November 8, Warner equaled his career-high of five touchdown passes in a single game during a 41–21 victory over the Chicago Bears. This performance led to Warner being named both the NFC Offensive Player of the Week and the FedEx Air NFL Player of the Week. On November 15, 2009, Warner reached a career milestone with his 200th touchdown pass during a 31–20 win against the Seattle Seahawks.

On November 22, 2009, during a 21–13 victory over the St. Louis Rams, Warner left the game after suffering a concussion. Warner continued to suffer from post-concussion symptoms and on November 29, 2009, he was deactivated against the Tennessee Titans, breaking his consecutive starts streak at 41 games. On December 6, 2009, Warner returned to action as the Cardinals defeated the Minnesota Vikings 30–17. Warner registered his fourth consecutive game with a passer rating of 120 or better, making him only the second quarterback in NFL history to accomplish the feat. After his three-touchdown performance, Warner was named both the NFC Offensive Player of the Week and the FedEx Air NFL Player of the Week.

On December 27, 2009, Warner became only the second quarterback in NFL history to throw 100 touchdown passes with two teams (Hall of Famer Fran Tarkenton is the other), in the Cardinals' 31–10 win over the St. Louis Rams.

===== 2009 postseason =====
On January 10, 2010, Warner threw five touchdowns and completed 29 of 33 passes for 379 yards in a 51–45 victory over the Green Bay Packers. The game had the highest combined total score in NFL playoff history. Warner became one of the very few quarterbacks in NFL history to throw more touchdowns (5) than incompletions (4) in a playoff game. Warner finished the game with the second highest quarterback rating in NFL playoff history with a rating of 154.1. He also became the second quarterback to throw for five touchdown passes in a playoff game twice, and the first to do so since the merger of the leagues. He is also the oldest player to have thrown that many touchdown passes in a playoff game (38 years, 202 days). Warner also tied the NFL record for consecutive playoff games with at least three touchdown passes (three games). Since the playoff game was his last at home in the playoffs during his career, he finished a perfect 7–0 in home contests (4–0 with St. Louis; 3–0 with Arizona).

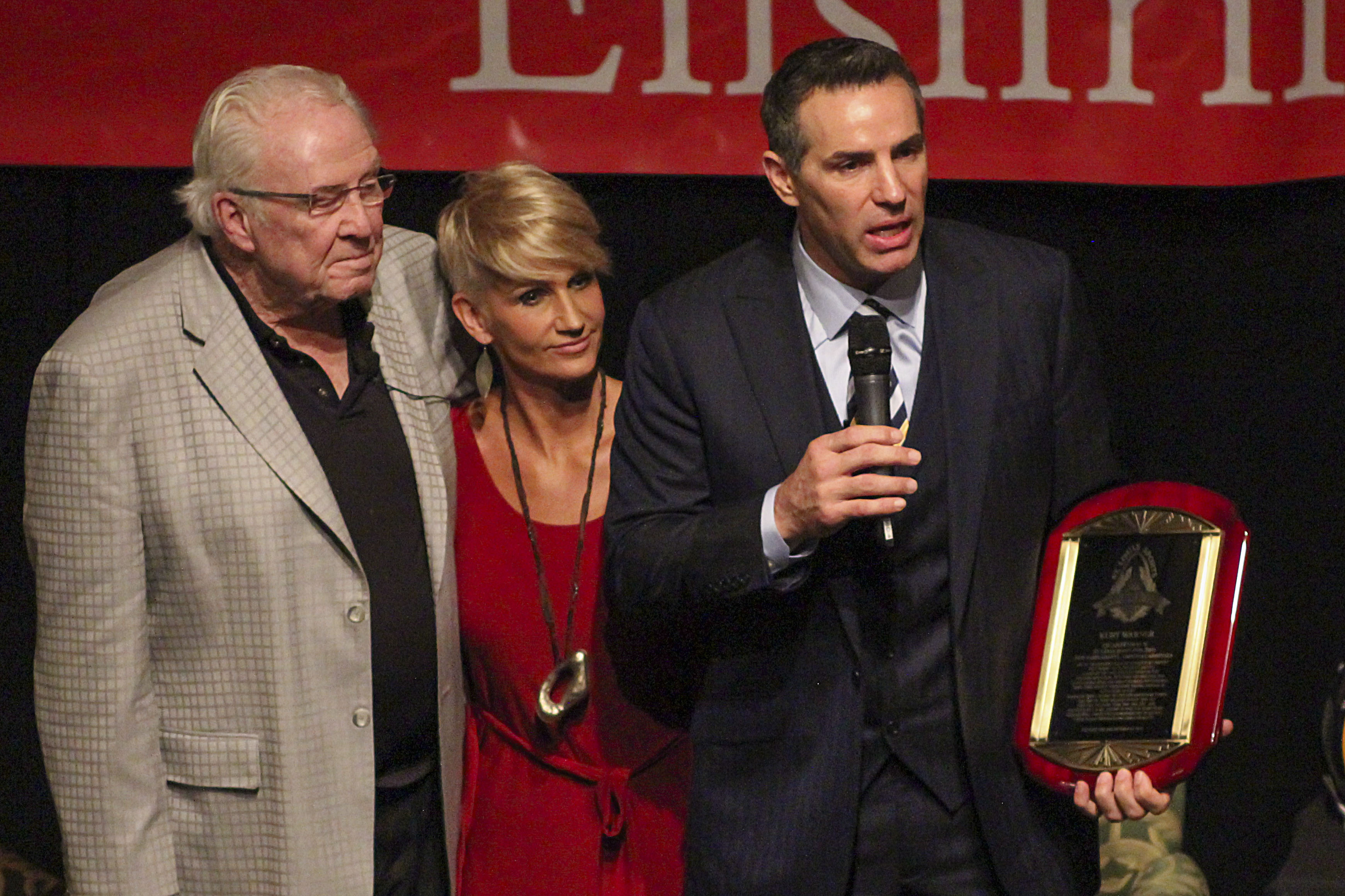
Warner inducted into the St. Louis Sports Hall of Fame. Coach Jim Hanifan and wife Brenda Warner look on.

On January 16, Warner was injured in the first half trying to tackle the ball carrier after an interception on the way to a 45–14 loss to the New Orleans Saints in the NFC Divisional Round. He returned for the second half, but yielded to understudy Matt Leinart midway through the fourth quarter. In 2012, the NFL discovered the Saints had placed a bounty on Warner. Warner never accused the Saints of making an illegal hit or ending his career, saying "It was a violent hit, no question. But I also believe it was a legal hit."

=== Retirement ===
Warner officially announced his retirement from the NFL in January 2010. He said he was looking forward to finally being a true father to his seven kids, and that he wanted to spend time with his wife. He spoke on the impact and influence of his family, former teammates, and God. He became eligible for induction into the Hall of Fame following the 2014 season. In December 2014, Warner admitted he briefly considered coming out of retirement and returning to the Cardinals following the team losing Carson Palmer and Drew Stanton due to injuries.

== Career statistics ==
Legend
| | AP NFL MVP |
| | Super Bowl MVP |
| | Won the Super Bowl |
| | NFL record |
| | Led the league |
| **Bold** | Career high |

=== College ===
College statistics
| Year | Team | Games | | | Passing | | | | |
| Year | Team | GP | GS | Record | Cmp | Att | Pct | Yds | TD |
|---|---|---|---|---|---|---|---|---|---|
| 1990 | Northern Iowa | — | — | — | 8 | 13 | **61.5** | 141 | 2 |
| 1991 | Northern Iowa | — | — | — | 15 | 25 | 60.0 | 25 | 0 |
| 1992 | Northern Iowa | — | — | — | 5 | 18 | 27.8 | 69 | 0 |
| 1993 | Northern Iowa | 12 | 12 | 8–4 | **173** | **296** | 58.4 | **2,747** | **17** |
| Career | | 12 | 12 | 8–4 | 201 | 352 | 57.1 | 2,982 | 19 |

=== AFL ===
| Year | Team | Games | | | Passing | | | | | | | | | Rushing | | | | Sacked | |
| Year | Team | GP | GS | Record | Cmp | Att | Pct | Yds | Y/A | Lng | TD | Int | Rtg | Att | Yds | Y/A | TD | Sck | SckY |
|---|---|---|---|---|---|---|---|---|---|---|---|---|---|---|---|---|---|---|---|
| 1995 | Iowa | 12 | 12 | 7–5 | 237 | 400 | 59.2 | 2,980 | 7.4 | **46** | 43 | 14 | 94.8 | **29** | −67 | −2.3 | 4 | **15** | **115** |
| 1996 | Iowa | 14 | 14 | **12–2** | 259 | 422 | 61.4 | 3,336 | 7.9 | 45 | 61 | **15** | 107.5 | 21 | 7 | 0.3 | **7** | 13 | 122 |
| 1997 | Iowa | 14 | 14 | 11–3 | **322** | **498** | **64.7** | **4,149** | **8.3** | **46** | **79** | 14 | **118.6** | 12 | **22** | **1.8** | 5 | 0 | 0 |
| Career | | 40 | 40 | 30–10 | 818 | 1,320 | 61.9 | 10,465 | 7.9 | 46 | 183 | 43 | 107.8 | 62 | −38 | −0.6 | 16 | 28 | 237 |

=== NFL Europe ===
| Year | Team | Games | | | Passing | | | | | | | | | Rushing | | | | | Sacked | |
| Year | Team | GP | GS | Record | Cmp | Att | Pct | Yds | Y/A | Lng | TD | Int | Rtg | Att | Yds | Y/A | Lng | TD | Sck | SckY |
|---|---|---|---|---|---|---|---|---|---|---|---|---|---|---|---|---|---|---|---|---|
| 1998 | Amsterdam | 10 | 10 | 7–3 | 165 | 326 | 50.6 | 2,101 | 6.4 | 47 | 15 | 6 | 78.8 | 19 | 17 | 0.9 | 13 | 1 | 28 | 186 |
| Career | | 10 | 10 | 7–3 | 165 | 326 | 50.6 | 2,101 | 6.4 | 47 | 15 | 6 | 78.8 | 19 | 17 | 0.9 | 13 | 1 | 28 | 186 |

=== NFL ===
==== Regular season ====
| Year | Team | Games | | | Passing | | | | | | | | | | Rushing | | | | | Sacked | | Fumbles | |
| Year | Team | GP | GS | Record | Cmp | Att | Pct | Yds | Y/A | Y/G | Lng | TD | Int | Rtg | Att | Yds | Y/A | Lng | TD | Sck | SckY | Fum | Lost |
|---|---|---|---|---|---|---|---|---|---|---|---|---|---|---|---|---|---|---|---|---|---|---|---|
| 1998 | STL | 1 | 0 | — | 4 | 11 | 36.4 | 39 | 3.5 | 39.0 | 21 | 0 | 0 | 47.7 | 0 | 0 | — | 0 | 0 | 0 | 0 | 0 | 0 |
| 1999 | STL | 16 | 16 | 13–3 | 325 | 499 | 65.1 | 4,353 | 8.7 | 272.1 | 75 | **41** | 13 | **109.2** | 23 | **92** | 4.0 | 22 | **1** | 29 | 201 | 9 | 5 |
| 2000 | STL | 11 | 11 | 8–3 | 235 | 347 | 67.7 | 3,429 | **9.9** | **311.7** | **85** | 21 | 18 | 98.3 | 18 | 17 | 0.9 | 11 | 0 | 20 | 115 | 4 | 1 |
| 2001 | STL | 16 | 16 | **14–2** | 375 | 546 | **68.7** | **4,830** | 8.8 | 301.9 | 65 | 36 | **22** | 101.4 | **28** | 60 | 2.1 | **23** | 0 | 38 | **233** | 10 | 4 |
| 2002 | STL | 7 | 6 | 0–6 | 144 | 220 | 65.5 | 1,431 | 6.5 | 204.4 | 43 | 3 | 11 | 67.4 | 8 | 33 | **4.1** | 9 | 0 | 21 | 130 | 8 | 2 |
| 2003 | STL | 2 | 1 | 0–1 | 38 | 65 | 58.5 | 365 | 5.6 | 182.5 | 37 | 1 | 1 | 72.9 | 1 | 0 | 0.0 | 0 | 0 | 6 | 38 | 6 | 3 |
| 2004 | NYG | 10 | 9 | 5–4 | 174 | 277 | 62.8 | 2,054 | 7.4 | 205.4 | 62 | 6 | 4 | 86.5 | 13 | 30 | 2.3 | 13 | **1** | **39** | 196 | **12** | 4 |
| 2005 | ARI | 10 | 10 | 2–8 | 242 | 375 | 64.5 | 2,713 | 7.2 | 271.3 | 63 | 11 | 9 | 85.8 | 13 | 28 | 2.2 | 13 | 0 | 23 | 158 | 9 | 5 |
| 2006 | ARI | 6 | 5 | 1–4 | 108 | 168 | 64.3 | 1,377 | 8.2 | 229.5 | 64 | 6 | 5 | 89.3 | 13 | 3 | 0.2 | 9 | 0 | 14 | 104 | 10 | 3 |
| 2007 | ARI | 14 | 11 | 5–6 | 281 | 441 | 62.3 | 3,417 | 7.6 | 244.1 | 62 | 27 | 17 | 89.8 | 17 | 15 | 0.9 | 9 | **1** | 20 | 140 | **12** | 6 |
| 2008 | ARI | 16 | 16 | 9–7 | **401** | **598** | 67.1 | 4,583 | 7.7 | 286.4 | 79 | 30 | 14 | 96.9 | 18 | −2 | −0.1 | 11 | 0 | 26 | 182 | 11 | **7** |
| 2009 | ARI | 15 | 15 | 10–5 | 339 | 513 | 66.1 | 3,753 | 7.1 | 250.2 | 45 | 26 | 14 | 93.2 | 21 | 10 | 0.5 | 10 | 0 | 24 | 172 | 11 | 6 |
| Career | | 124 | 116 | 67–49 | 2,666 | 4,070 | 65.5 | 32,344 | 7.9 | 260.8 | 85 | 208 | 128 | 93.7 | 173 | 286 | 1.7 | 23 | 3 | 260 | 1,669 | 102 | 46 |

==== Postseason ====
| Year | Team | Games | | | Passing | | | | | | | | | | Rushing | | | | | Sacked | | Fumbles | |
| Year | Team | GP | GS | Record | Cmp | Att | Pct | Yds | Y/A | Y/G | Lng | TD | Int | Rtg | Att | Yds | Y/A | Lng | TD | Sck | SckY | Fum | Lost |
|---|---|---|---|---|---|---|---|---|---|---|---|---|---|---|---|---|---|---|---|---|---|---|---|
| 1999 | STL | 3 | 3 | **3–0** | 77 | 121 | 63.6 | 1,063 | 8.8 | 354.3 | **77** | 8 | **4** | 100.0 | 6 | 3 | 0.5 | 4 | 0 | 4 | 24 | **3** | **1** |
| 2000 | STL | 1 | 1 | 0–1 | 24 | 40 | 60.0 | 365 | 9.1 | **365.0** | 38 | 3 | 3 | 83.9 | 1 | 5 | **5.0** | 5 | **1** | 2 | 15 | 1 | **1** |
| 2001 | STL | 3 | 3 | 2–1 | 68 | 107 | 63.6 | 793 | 7.4 | 264.3 | 50 | 4 | 3 | 86.7 | **9** | **8** | 0.9 | 5 | **1** | **6** | **45** | 2 | 0 |
| 2003 | STL | 0 | 0 | — | DNP | | | | | | | | | | | | | | | | | | |
| 2008 | ARI | 4 | 4 | 3–1 | **92** | **135** | 68.1 | **1,147** | 8.5 | 286.8 | 71 | **11** | 3 | 112.2 | 8 | 1 | 0.1 | **6** | 0 | 5 | 20 | 2 | **1** |
| 2009 | ARI | 2 | 2 | 1–1 | 46 | 59 | **78.0** | 584 | **9.9** | 292.0 | 33 | 5 | 1 | **129.1** | 1 | 0 | 0.0 | 0 | 0 | 2 | 12 | 2 | 0 |
| Career | | 13 | 13 | 9–4 | 307 | 462 | 66.5 | 3,952 | 8.6 | 304.0 | 77 | 31 | 14 | 102.8 | 25 | 17 | 0.7 | 6 | 2 | 19 | 116 | 10 | 3 |

==== Super Bowl ====
| Year | SB | Team | Opp. | Passing | | | | | | | | Rushing | | | | Result |
| Year | SB | Team | Opp. | Cmp | Att | Pct | Yds | Y/A | TD | Int | Rtg | Att | Yds | Y/A | TD | Result |
|---|---|---|---|---|---|---|---|---|---|---|---|---|---|---|---|---|
| 1999 | XXXIV | STL | TEN | 24 | **45** | 53.3 | **414** | 9.2 | 2 | 0 | 99.7 | 1 | 1 | 1.0 | 0 | **W** 23–16 |
| 2001 | XXXVI | STL | NE | 28 | 44 | 63.6 | 365 | 8.3 | 1 | **2** | 78.3 | **3** | **6** | **2.0** | **1** | L 20–17 |
| 2008 | XLIII | ARI | PIT | **31** | 43 | **72.1** | 377 | 8.3 | **3** | 1 | **112.3** | 1 | 0 | 0.0 | 0 | L 27–23 |
| Career | | | | 83 | 132 | 62.9 | 1,156 | 8.8 | 6 | 3 | 96.7 | 5 | 7 | 1.4 | 1 | W−L 1–2 |

== Career highlights ==
=== Awards and honors ===
NFL

- Super Bowl champion (XXXIV)
- 3× NFC champion (1999, 2001, 2008)
- Super Bowl MVP (XXXIV)
- 2× NFL Most Valuable Player (1999, 2001)
- Walter Payton NFL Man of the Year (2008)
- 2× First-team All-Pro (1999, 2001)
- 4× Pro Bowl (1999–2001, 2008)
- 2× NFL passing touchdowns leader (1999, 2001)
- 3× NFL completion percentage leader (1999–2001)
- 2× NFL passer rating leader (1999, 2001)
- NFL passing yards leader (2001)
- The Sporting News Athlete of the Year (2000)
- 2× NFC Offensive Player of the Month (October 1999, September 2000)
- 9× NFC Offensive Player of the Week (Week 3, 1999; Week 5, 2000; Week 3, 2001; Week 12, 2001; Week 11, 2005; Week 1, 2006; Week 2, 2008; Week 9, 2009; Week 13, 2009)
- 2× Pro Football Weekly NFL Offensive Player of the Week (Week 5, 2000; Week 9, 2009)
- No. 90 on The Top 100: NFL's Greatest Players
- PFWA Good Guy Award (2009)

AFL

- 2× First-team All-Arena (1996, 1997)
- Arena Football Hall of Fame
- Iowa Barnstormers No. 13 retired
- Iowa Barnstormers Hall of Fame

College

- Gateway Conference Offensive Player of the Year (1993)
- First-team All-Gateway (1993)

=== NFL records ===
- First quarterback to throw 400+ yards in a Super Bowl game – 414 yards against Tennessee in Super Bowl XXXIV

- Was the most passing yards in a Super Bowl game until surpassed by Tom Brady in Super Bowl LI

- Most touchdown passes in a single postseason – 11 touchdowns (in 2009, tied with Joe Montana in 1990, Joe Flacco in 2013, and Patrick Mahomes in 2021)
- Career passing yards per game, playoffs: 304.0
- Highest rate of games with 300+ yards passing (min. 100 games played) – 41.9% (52/124)
- First quarterback to throw 40 touchdowns and win a Super Bowl in the same season (in 1999; Tom Brady accomplished the same feat in 2020 when he threw 40 touchdowns and won Super Bowl LV.)
- Most yards passing in the first five games of a season – 1947 yards (2000)
- Most yards passing in the first six games of a season – 2260 yards (2000)
- Highest average passing yards per game on Monday Night Football – 329.4 yards (min 7 games)
- Most wins in the NFC Championship Game without a loss (3–0; 1999, 2001, 2008).

Warner shares several records:

- One of four quarterbacks to throw 100 touchdown passes with two teams (Fran Tarkenton, Peyton Manning, and Tom Brady)
- One of two quarterbacks tied to throw five touchdown passes in two playoff games – (following Daryle Lamonica)
- One of two quarterbacks to complete 80% of his passes in two playoff games (tied with Peyton Manning)
- One of two quarterbacks with four consecutive games with a passer rating over 120 (in 2009, tied with Johnny Unitas)
- One of four quarterbacks to make Super Bowl starts with two teams (with Craig Morton – Dallas Cowboys (in 1970) and Denver Broncos (in 1977), Peyton Manning – Indianapolis Colts (in 2006 and 2009) and Denver Broncos (in 2013 and 2015), and Tom Brady – New England Patriots (in 2002, 2004–2005, 2008, 2012, 2015, and 2017–2019) and Tampa Bay Buccaneers (in 2021))
- One of five quarterbacks to win a Conference championship with two teams (with Craig Morton and Earl Morrall and Peyton Manning and Tom Brady)

==== Rams franchise records ====
- 2nd most touchdown passes in a single season (41, 1999) (tied with Matthew Stafford, 2021)
- Single season leader in passer rating (109.2, 1999)

==== Cardinals franchise records ====
- Most pass completions in a single game – 40 (September 28, 2008)
- Highest pass completion percentage with at least 11 passes – 92.3% (September 20, 2009)
- Fourth Cardinal to post a perfect passer rating
- Most passes completed in a single season – 401 (2008)
- Most passes attempted in a single season – 598 (2008)

== Post-retirement career ==
Warner became an Iowa Barnstormers broadcaster for the 2011 Arena Football League season. In May 2010, he was inducted into the Arena Football Hall of Fame. He is also a member of the Iowa Barnstormers Hall of Fame.

Warner was inducted into the St. Louis Sports Hall of Fame in 2014.

Warner was selected for induction in the Pro Football Hall of Fame class of 2017. He was inducted on August 5, 2017, alongside Morten Andersen, Terrell Davis, Kenny Easley, Jerry Jones, Jason Taylor, and LaDainian Tomlinson. Warner is the only person inducted into both the Pro Football Hall of Fame and the Arena Football Hall of Fame.

From 2015 to 2018, Warner was a coach at Desert Mountain High School in Scottsdale, Arizona. Notably, Kedon Slovis played under Warner before being recruited by the USC Trojans for the 2019 college football season.

Since 2019, Warner has been the quarterbacks coach at Brophy College Preparatory.

== Broadcasting ==
In 2010, Warner joined NFL Network as an analyst. He can be seen regularly on NFL Total Access, as well as in-studio on NFL Network's Thursday Night Football pregame show, Thursday Night Kickoff Presented by Sears. Warner also served as an analyst for the NFL Network's coverage of the 2010 Arena Football League playoffs. Warner tested positive for COVID-19 in January 2021, and was unable to serve on the studio panel for NFL GameDay Morning for the wild card playoff round.

In August 2010, Fox Sports announced that Warner would be serving as a color analyst on the network's NFL coverage in the 2010 season. He teamed with play-by-play announcers Chris Rose or Chris Myers to call regional games.

In 2014, Westwood One radio hired Warner as a substitute analyst on Monday Night Football games when regular analyst Boomer Esiason is unavailable. In 2018, Warner became the full-time radio analyst.

== Personal life ==
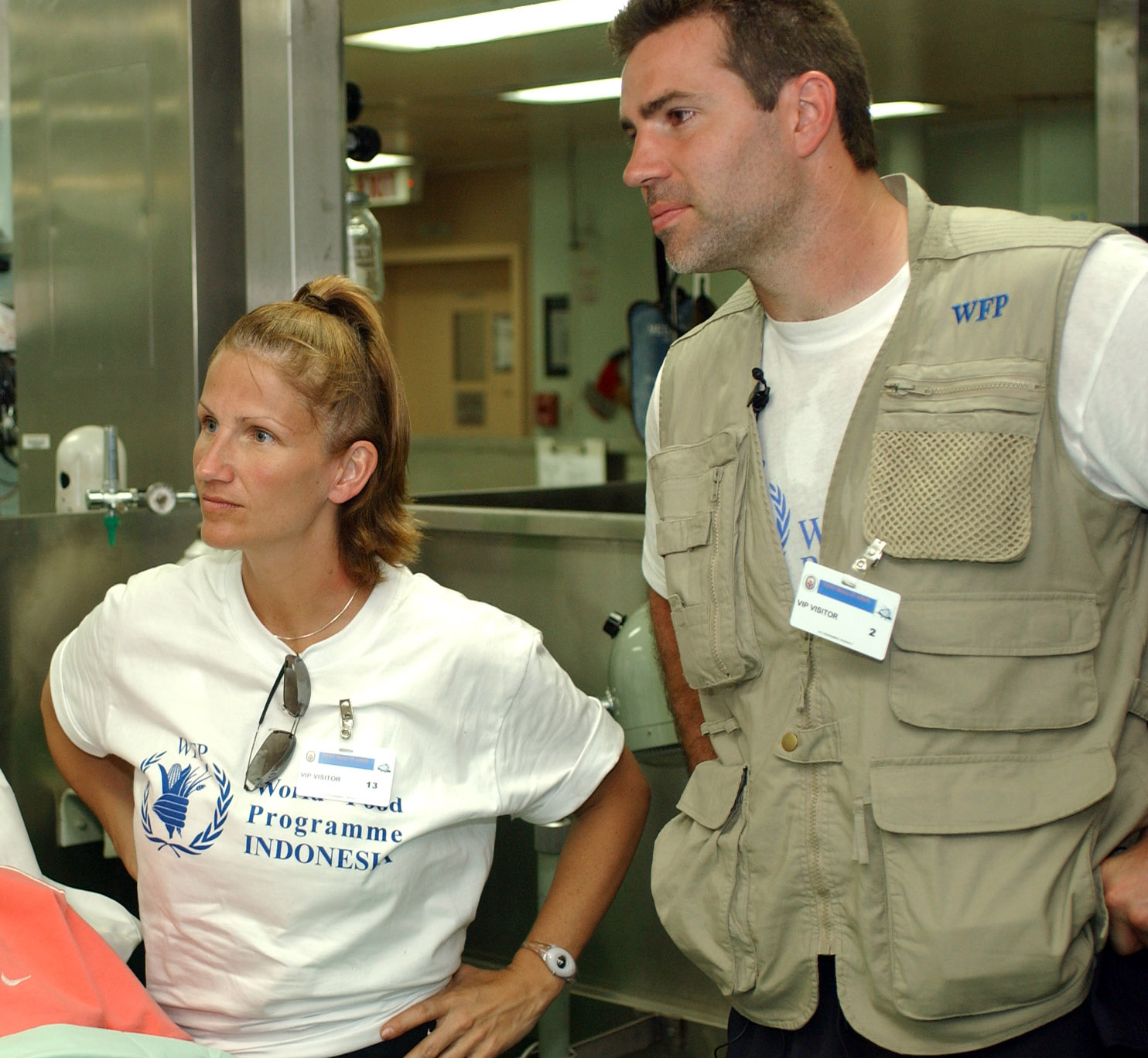
Kurt and his wife Brenda in February 2005

=== Childhood ===
Kurt Warner was born to Gene and Sue Warner. Warner's parents divorced when he was six. Kurt and his brother, Matt, lived with their mother, including through another short marriage and divorce.

Kurt's father, Gene Warner, remarried a year after divorcing Kurt's mother. Warner's stepmother, Mimi Warner, also had a son named Matt (Post). The three boys formed a close relationship soon thereafter. Kurt graduated in 1989 from Regis High School, Cedar Rapids, Iowa, where he was quarterback of the school's Class 3A football team.

=== College ===
Warner graduated from University of Northern Iowa with a degree in communications.

=== Marriage ===
During college, Warner met his future wife, Brenda Carney Meoni; they married on October 11, 1997. Brenda is a former United States Marine Corps corporal. She was divorced with two children, one of whom was left brain damaged and blind after being accidentally dropped by Brenda's ex-husband, leading to her hardship discharge from the Marines in 1990.

After Warner was cut from the Packers' training camp in 1994, he got a job working the night shift as a night stock clerk at a local Hy-Vee grocery store, in addition to his work as an assistant coach at Northern Iowa. While Warner was working as an assistant coach, the couple were living in Warner's parents' basement in Cedar Falls. Brenda's parents were killed in 1996 when their Mountain View, Arkansas, home was destroyed by a tornado. Warner and Brenda married on October 11, 1997, at the St. John American Lutheran Church, the same place where the service for Brenda's parents was held. Warner was still hoping to get an NFL tryout, but with that possibility appearing dim and the long hours at Hy-Vee for minimum wage taking their toll, Warner began his Arena League career.

After marrying Brenda, Warner officially adopted her two children from her first marriage; they have since had five children together. His son E. J. is the starting quarterback for the Fresno State Bulldogs. Another son, Kade, played wide receiver for the Kansas State Wildcats and signed with the Tampa Bay Buccaneers in April 2023.

=== Christian faith and testimony ===
Kurt and Brenda Warner are devout evangelical Christians. His faith first emerged on the national stage following the Rams' Super Bowl victory, where he was named the game's MVP:

Mike Tirico from ABC: "Kurt, first things first — tell me about the final touchdown pass to Isaac."
Kurt Warner: "Well, first things first, I've got to thank my Lord and Savior up above — thank you, Jesus!"

Nine years later, upon leading the Cardinals to the franchise's first-ever Super Bowl, Warner's response was similar:

Terry Bradshaw from Fox: "You're not going to like this, but you're the third oldest quarterback to ever play in the Super Bowl. How does that make you feel?"
Kurt Warner: "Everybody's going to be tired of hearing this, but I never get tired of saying it. There's one reason that I'm standing up on this stage today. That's because of my Lord up above. I've got to say thanks to Jesus; you knew I was going to do it, but I've got to do it. And secondly, I've gotta say thanks to you guys (motioning to the Arizona fans); when nobody else believed in us, when nobody else believed in me, you guys did. And we're going to the Super Bowl!"

Warner has usually attended charismatic churches, and believes that God healed him from a concussion he suffered in 2000. However, he eschews the term "charismatic". In 2001, he told Charisma, "I'm just a Christian."

== Media appearances ==
=== Television ===
On January 27, 2009, Warner made a special appearance on the NBC reality show The Biggest Loser.

Warner made a guest appearance on Disney's The Suite Life on Deck as himself, in the episode "Any Given Fantasy" which aired on January 18, 2010.

On February 9, 2010, Warner was a surprise guest on the final episode of The Jay Leno Show.

On August 30, 2010, it was announced on live television that Warner would be appearing as a contestant on Dancing with the Stars. His professional dance partner was Anna Trebunskaya; the couple was eliminated in week 8, the Instant Choreography Week.

Warner appeared as the host of The Moment, a reality series on USA Network, in 2013.

Television guest appearances
| Year | Title | Role | Notes |
|---|---|---|---|
| 2009 | The Biggest Loser | Himself | Season 7, episode 4 |
| 2010 | The Suite Life on Deck | Himself | Episode: "Any Given Fantasy" (season 2) |
| 2010 | The Jay Leno Show | Himself | Surprise visit on the final show |
| 2010 | Dancing with the Stars | Himself | Season 11 contestant |
| 2015 | Bella and the Bulldogs | Himself | Episode: "Wide Deceiver" (season 2 premiere) |
| 2017 | Life in Pieces | Himself | Episode: "Tailgate Spiral Souvenir Seating" (Season 2) |

=== Film ===
In 2003, GoodTimes Entertainment released the direct-to-home video Kurt Warner's Good Sports Gang, a film featuring Warner as the "coach" of a group of animated sports balls. The series was sponsored by Warner, and focused on religious faith and moral values. A portion of the proceeds went to Warner's First Things First Foundation. Although it was originally planned as a series, Episode 1: Elliot the Invincible, was the only release along with Together, We're Better (Episode 2) and a few shorts featuring Warner and his adopted daughter, Jesse Warner.

In February 2020, it was announced that the Erwin Brothers were creating and releasing a theatrical film about Warner's life titled American Underdog, with Zachary Levi as Warner. The film was produced by Kingdom Story Company, and distributed by Lionsgate on December 25, 2021, to generally favorable reviews.

== Endorsements ==
On December 3, 2010, Warner's first multi-year post-retirement endorsement agreement was announced. Amway North America announced that it had signed Warner to a multi-year endorsement agreement to represent the Nutrilite brand. Amway reportedly agreed to make a $50,000 donation to Kurt Warner's First Things First Foundation.

In addition to his post-retirement endorsements and charity work, Warner has invested in the Elite Football League of India, a South Asian professional football league. Other prominent American backers include former Chicago Bears head coach Mike Ditka, former Dallas Cowboys wide receiver Michael Irvin, sports analyst and former NFL quarterback Ron Jaworski, and actor Mark Wahlberg. Warner's total investment amount remains undisclosed, although $50,000 of it will go towards a donation of footballs to schools and underprivileged children throughout India.

Warner was one of three Iowa college athletes, each from one of the state's three public four-year universities, to be the subjects of butter sculptures at the 2023 Iowa State Fair. Warner was joined by Caitlin Clark (Iowa basketball) and Jack Trice (Iowa State football).

== Public service ==
Warner has also appeared in several public service announcements for Civitan International, promoting his and Brenda's volunteer efforts and their work with the developmentally disabled. This issue is personally close to Warner, as Zachary, his adopted son from Brenda's first marriage, suffered major brain damage as an infant when his biological father accidentally dropped him.

Warner has devoted time and money to his First Things First Foundation, the name of which was derived from his interview after winning the Super Bowl in 1999. The foundation is dedicated to impacting lives by promoting Christian values, sharing experiences and providing opportunities to encourage everyone that all things are possible when people seek to put "first things first". The foundation has been involved with numerous projects for causes such as children's hospitals, people with developmental disabilities and assisting single parents. Warner's work both on and off the field resulted in him being awarded the NFL Walter Payton Man of the Year Award 2008, which was presented to him at the start of Super Bowl XLIII. In March 2009, Warner was honored with the Muhammad Ali Sports Leadership Award. Warner was selected by USA Weekend as the winner of its annual Most Caring Athlete Award for 2009. In December 2009, Warner topped a Sports Illustrated poll of NFL players to name the best role model on and off the field in the NFL.

In February 2010, Warner received the annual Bart Starr Award, given for outstanding character and leadership in the home, on the field and in the community. At the award presentation, Bart Starr said of Warner: "We have never given this award to anyone who is more deserving".

== See also ==
- Kurt Warner's Arena Football Unleashed, a 2000 video game
- List of National Football League and Arena Football League players
- List of National Football League quarterback playoff records
- List of NFL players who have posted a perfect passer rating
