= Rooftop Sessions =

Studio album by The Last Wish
- Released: 1993
- Recorded: Deep Dot Studios, Sept 25 and October 6, 1993
- Genre: Rock

The Last Wish chronology
Rooftop Sessions	The First of February

Rooftop Sessions is the first album by The Last Wish. It was released on cassette tape in 1993 in Houston, Texas. The song "Mountain" was one of the first song ever written by Justin Furstenfeld of Blue October and is a staple at Justin's solo concerts.

== Track listing ==
1. "Never Dreams"
2. "Misti Blue"
3. "Circle of 11"
4. "One More Time"
5. "Soul Bruised"
6. "Don't Care"
7. "Mountain"
8. "Softly Kill Me"
9. "Goodbye"
10. "You"
11. "Rooftops"
