= First of the month =

Recurring ordinal calendar date

The first of the month or first day of the month is the recurring calendar date position corresponding to the day numbered 1 of each month. In the Gregorian calendar (and other calendars that number days sequentially within a month), the first day occurs in every month of the year, and therefore occurs twelve times per year.

- First of January
- First of February
- First of March
- First of April
- First of May
- First of June
- First of July
- First of August
- First of September
- First of October
- First of November
- First of December

In addition to these dates, this date occurs in months of many other calendars, such as the Bengali calendar and the Hebrew calendar.

== See also ==
- First (disambiguation)
- First of May (disambiguation)
