= A Separate Creation =

1996 book by Chandler Burr

A Separate Creation: The Search for the Biological Origins of Sexual Orientation
- Cover of the first edition
- Author: Chandler Burr
- Language: English
- Subject: Sexual orientation
- Publisher: Hyperion
- Publication date: 1996
- Publication place: United States
- Media type: Print (Hardcover and Paperback)
- Pages: 354
- ISBN: 978-0786882403

A Separate Creation: The Search for the Biological Origins of Sexual Orientation, also published with the subtitle How Biology Makes Us Gay, is a 1996 book about the development of sexual orientation by the journalist Chandler Burr.

== Summary ==
The book explores the 1993 announcement by American scientists suggesting the identification of a "gay gene."

Burr reports on research involving animal models, including hormonally altered rats and species exhibiting atypical sexual characteristics, and discusses technologies such as DNA microarrays that were used to investigate genetic influences on sexual orientation.

A Separate Creation also addresses the ethical and political implications of this research, including debates about potential medical interventions and societal responses to scientific claims about the origins of homosexuality.

== See also ==
- Biology and sexual orientation
