= La Première =

La 1re, La 1ère or La Première (French, 'The First') may refer to:

- La Première (Belgium), a French-language radio channel in Belgium
- La Première (RTI), a terrestrial TV channel in Côte d'Ivoire
- La Première (French TV network), operating in France's overseas departments and collectivities
- La Première (Switzerland), a French-language radio station in Switzerland
- La Première, Air France's long haul first class product

== See also ==
- Premiere (disambiguation), including "Première"
- Premier (disambiguation), including "le Premier" (le 1er) masculine of "Première"
- The First (disambiguation)
- First (disambiguation)
- Une (disambiguation) (French, 'One')
- Un (disambiguation) (French, 'One')
- 1 (disambiguation)
