= First League =

First League may refer to:

== Association football ==
=== Current Leagues ===
- Armenian First League, the Armenian second tier men's division
- Austrian Football First League, the Austrian second tier men's division
- Belarusian First League, the Belarusian second tier men's division
- First League of Belgrade, a section of Serbia's fifth football league
- First League of the Federation of Bosnia and Herzegovina, a second-level league
- First Football League of Kosovo, a second-level league
- First League of Primorje-Gorski Kotar County, the fifth level league in the Croatian football league system
- First League of the Republika Srpska, a second-level football competition in Bosnia and Herzegovina
- Bulgarian First League, the Bulgarian top-flight men's division
- Czech First League, the Czech top-flight men's division
- First Macedonian Football League, the Macedonian top-flight men's division
- Montenegrin First League, the Montenegrin top-flight men's division
- Russian First League, the Russian second tier men's division
- TFF First League, the Turkish second tier men's division
- Serbian First League, the Serbian second tier men's division
- Ukrainian First League, the Ukrainian second tier men's division
- Uzbekistan First League, the Uzbekistan second tier men's division

=== Defunct leagues ===
- Czechoslovak First League, the former Czechoslovak top-flight men's division (1925–1993)
- Soviet First League, the former Soviet second-flight men's football division (1936–1991)
- First League of Herzeg-Bosnia, the top football league in Croatian Republic of Herzeg-Bosnia (1993–2001)
- First League of Serbia and Montenegro, the former Yugoslav/Serbo-Montenegrin top-flight men's division (1992–2006)
- Yugoslav First League, the former Yugoslav top-flight men's division (1923–1992)

== Other ==
- First League of Armed Neutrality, an alliance of European naval powers, 1780–1783
