= Preliminary examination =

Preliminary examination may refer to:

== In education ==
- Prelim, an examination that qualifies a student to continue higher level studies and/or allows a student to see how prepared they are for the looming examinations
- Comprehensive examination, a required examination that a student must pass to continue a course of study
- The Preliminary College Scholastic Ability Test in South Korea
- PSAT/NMSQT, a national standardized test taken by high school students in the United States

== Legal processes ==
- An examination performed by an International Preliminary Examining Authority under the Patent Cooperation Treaty
- Preliminary hearing, a court appearance to determine if there is enough evidence to bind the accused for trial

== Civil services ==
- A component in several examinations in the Indian Civil Services:
  - Civil Services Examination of India
  - Karnataka Administrative Service examination
- Bangladesh Civil Service Examination
