= First Place =

First Place may refer to:

- A front-runner
- First Place (band), a Japanese boy band
- First Place (album), a 1957 album by J. J. Johnson
- "First Place", a 2018 song by Larray
- "First Place" (Justin Bieber song), a 2025 song by Justin Bieber from the album Swag
- 1st Place, a 1982 album led by trombonist Jimmy Knepper, recorded in 1982 and released in 1986
