= Joshua First =

Joshua First is an American historian. First is a Croft Associate Professor of History and International Studies and specializes in the history of Russia and Ukraine during the 20th and 21st centuries. Professor First came to Mississippi in 2010 after receiving his Ph.D. in History from the University of Michigan.

== Books ==
- Ukrainian Cinema: Belonging and Identity during the Soviet Thaw (2014)
- Sergei Paradjanov: Shadows of Forgotten Ancestors (2016)
