= Craig First =

American composer

C. P. First (Craig P. First, born March 16, 1960) is an American composer of the avant-garde. He was born in New York City where he currently resides. Recognized primarily for his chamber music, he has also composed opera, orchestral and electronic music. His music is characterized by its taut, often disturbing drama, and carefully calculated, discordant atonal language.

== Biography ==
Whilst still in his early teens, C. P. First began composing works of an experimental nature. During his primary education, he studied in New York City with Pulitzer prize-winning composer John Corigliano. First then pursued composition studies in Chicago, Illinois, where he studied at the University of Chicago with Pulitzer prize-winning composer Shulamit Ran. He earned his Masters and Doctoral degree (1990) from Northwestern University. During his years as a graduate student, First became deeply entrenched in the electronic and computer media that often reside at the core of his compositional output.

Whilst an undergraduate student, First was commissioned by Charles Moore and the ACM Chamber Opera of Chicago to write the one-act opera, The Soul of Rose Dede. His work caught the attention of influential cultural figures in Chicago, including impresario Dalia Kuceanas, who introduced the young composer to important European musicians. These introductions led to the commission of several works, including Two by One (solo violin) for the preeminent Russian violinist, Raimundas Katillus, who performed the composer's music at Carnegie Hall. Immediately following First's Carnegie Hall debut, performances of his works appeared throughout Europe and the major performance centers in the US.

Among the important European musicians with whom First came in contact was the brilliant Greek virtuoso Dimitris Marinos. Perhaps First's most well-known work, Tantrum, was written for Marinos, who performed the work widely in Europe and the US, including the World Music Days in England, the World Music Days in Luxembourg, Gaida Festival in Vilnius, Lithuania, and Carnegie Hall and Merkin Hall. Marinos and First collaborated on two other works, Epiphany and Contrapuntal Variations I commissioned by Commissioning Music/USA. First's composition, "I'vidi in terra angelici," was featured on the International Society for Contemporary Music (ISCM) Concert at Columbia University in New York. Other important performances include those at the renown "Darmstadt Music Festival" in Germany where his composition, "Drame lyrique," was performed by virtuoso Paul Bowman.

Although in recent years somewhat reclusive, the composer persistently emerges with new works that invariably receive critical acclaim. Most recently, his collaboration with New York filmmaker Matt Marello on the eccentric multi-media collaboration, The Eternal Return, received worldwide attention, including performances on the America in Berlin exhibit at the Berlin Academy of Art as part of the Museum of Modern Art (MoMA) in New York City. The multimedia work was also featured in Seoul, Korea by the Sori Ensemble and Chicago on the Second Saturday Series and the Chicago Cultural Center.

In addition to his work as a composer, First has contributed to the introduction of new works in his service as Artistic Director with the Chicago 21st Century Music Ensemble. Founded in 1992 by First and conductor Gui Bordo, the ensemble remains an important contemporary music group in Chicago.

From 1990 until 1995, First served as a Lecturer in Theory and Composition at Northwestern University and DePaul University. In 1995, he accepted a post at the University of Alabama, where he served as Professor and Chair of Composition and Theory.

== Works and Honors ==
First's interest in electronic media led to the production of some of his most important and widely performed works, including Tantrum (1992-amplified mandolin and tape), I' vidi in terra angelici (1990-mezzo-soprano and tape) on Petrarch sonnets, and Zu wissen was kein Engel weiss (1990-double orchestra and quadrophonic tape). His most recent music includes The Eternal Return, a multimedia work for five ensembles and five films created by New York filmmaker Matt Marello. His work was recently included in the New York Museum of Modern Art "America in Berlin" exhibition at the Berlin Academy of Art.

== Works ==
=== Opera ===
- The Soul of Rose Dede (Chamber Opera)

=== Film ===
- The Eternal Return (Five Films and Five Ensembles)

=== Chamber music ===
- String Quartet
- Two by One (Violin Solo / Arrangement for Alto Sax)
- Shadow Play (Piano Solo)
- Intimate Voices (Violin, Cello, and Piano)
- Black Sun (Violin and Piano)
- Tantrum (Amplified Mandolin and Tape)
- Mosaics (Saxophone Quartet)
- Flights of Fantasy (Chamber Orchestra)
- Zu wissen was kein Engel weiß (Double Orchestra and Four-Channel Tape)
- Summer Knowledge (Flute, Violin, Cello, and Piano)
- Drame lyrique (Guitar)
- Contrapuntal Variations I (Mandolin and Tape)
- Contrapuntal Variations II (Violin)
- Contrapuntal Variations III (Cello)
- Time's Dedication (Soprano, Narrator, and 8 Instruments)
- Chimera (Viola and Harpsichord)
- Scatterbrain (Cello Solo)
- Three Scenes for a Mad Clarinet (Clarinet and Piano)
- Dream Music for Guitar and Cello
- Lo, the Solace Passed (Alto Saxophone and Large Chamber Ensemble)
- The Apocryphal (Violin Duo)
- Jetz (Double Bass and Piano)

=== Orchestral music ===
- Flights of Fantasy (Chamber Orchestra)
- Zu wissen was kein Engel weiß (Double Orchestra and Four-Channel Tape)
- Concerto for Chamber Orchestra
- Sun Devil (Soprano Saxophone and Orchestra)

=== Electronic music ===
- Zu wissen was kein Engel weiß (Double Orchestra and Four-Channel Tape)
- I ' vidi in terra angelici (Soprano and Two-Channel Tape)
- Epiphany (Amplified Violin, Mandolin, and Two-Channel Tape)
- Tantrum (Amplified Mandolin and Tape)
- Fever 103o (Two-Channel Tape)
- Invariance (Two-Channel Tape)
