= First (perfume) =

Perfume by Van Cleef & Arpels

First is a perfume launched in 1976 by Van Cleef & Arpels with notes of hyacinth, rose, jasmine, amber and sandalwood. Jean-Claude Ellena is the perfumer, and Jacques Llorente designed the perfume bottle.

It was Princess Diana’s favourite perfume, and her son Harry brought the scent to his therapy sessions following her tragic death. (Princess Diana also wore Penhaligon's Bluebell, Hermès 24 Faubourg, and Houbigant Parfum Quelques Fleurs.)
