= Jean-Claude Ellena =

French perfumer and writer (born 1947)

- Born: April 7 1947 (age 78–79); Grasse, France
- Education: Givaudan
- Occupations: Perfumer, writer
- Years active: 1976 to present
- Known for: Inhouse-Perfumer of Hermès (2004-2019)

Jean-Claude Ellena (born 1947) is a French perfumer and writer. He was the in-house perfumer at Hermès from 2004 to 2016, prior to the appointment of incumbent Christine Nagel. He has collaborated with other major brands such as Van Cleef & Arpels, Acqua di Parma, Bulgari, Sisley, Cartier, Frédéric Malle, The Different Company, and Le Couvent - Maison de Parfum.

== Career ==
At an early age, Ellena picked jasmine with his grandmother in Grasse to sell to perfumers. Beginning with menial jobs, he became an apprentice at the factory of the essential oils maker Antoine Chiris in Grasse at the age 16 working on the night shift. He has reminisced, "Among other essential oils, we made a lot of oakmoss, and after I’d put the distiller on, I’d lie down on a bed of it and sleep".

In 1968, he became the first student at what was at the time the newly formed perfumery school of Givaudan, one of the oldest perfume factories, in Geneva, Switzerland. He left Givaudan in 1976 with two others perfumers for Lautier in Grasse where he created his first fragrance of note—"First" for Van Cleef & Arpels. In 1983, he joined Givaudan Paris as chief perfumer and Roure-Givandan and then he worked at Haarmaan & Reimer in Paris (which merged in 2003 with Dragoco to form Symrise). In 1990, he became one of the founding members of the Osmothèque, an international scent archive based in Versailles.

Ellena has been profoundly influenced by pioneering perfumer Edmond Roudnitska, particularly by his article, "Advice to a Young Perfumer", in a magazine given to him by his father.

Between 2004 and 2016 he was Hermès's exclusive in-house perfumer, appointed by Jean-Louis Dumas and Véronique Gautier. He has created fragrances for several major perfume houses including The Different Company, which he founded before joining Hermès. His daughter Céline Ellena now creates for The Different Company.

In 2005, Ellena created Un Jardin sur le Nil for Hermès. The story behind the creation of this fragrance was the subject of the book The Perfect Scent: A Year in the Perfume Industry in Paris and New York by Chandler Burr. In addition, the story in a limited form and accounts of other scents as well as his autobiography has been published in Perfume: The Alchemy of Scent. He is also a writer of "The Diary of a Nose: A Year in the Life of a Parfumeur."

In 2019, he became the exclusive "Director of Olfactory Creation" for the Maison de Parfums Le Couvent, for which he created a collection of 6 Signature Perfumes and co-signed around twenty other creations in collaboration with young perfumers until 2024.

== Notable works ==
=== For Hermès ===
- Hermèssence collection (exclusively in Hermès stores)
  - Ambre Narguile (2004)
  - Rose Ikebana (2004)
  - Osmanthe Yunnan (2005)
  - Brin de Réglisse (2007)
  - Vétiver Tonka (2004)
  - Vanille Galante (2009)
  - Paprika Brasil (2006)
  - Santal Massoïa (2011)
  - Ambre Narguilé (2004)
  - Iris Ukiyoé (2010)
  - Poivre Samarcande (2006)
  - Épice Marine (2013)
  - Cuir d’Ange (2014)
  - Muguet Porcelaine (2016)
- Rocabar (1998), with Gilles Romey and Bernard Bourgeois
- Un Jardin en Méditerranée (2003)
- Un Jardin sur le Nil (2005)
- Elixir des Merveilles (2006)
- Terre d'Hermès (2006)
- Kelly Calèche (2007)
- Un Jardin après la Mousson (2008)
- Kelly Calèche Parfum (2008)
- Kelly Calèche Eau de Parfum (2009)
- Eau de Gentiane Blanche (2009)
- Eau de Pamplemousse Rose (2009)
- Eau Claire des Merveilles (2010)
- Voyage d'Hermès (2010)
- Un Jardin sur le Toit (2011)
- Voyage d'Hermes Perfume (2012)
- Jour d'Hermes (2012)
- L’Ambre des Merveilles (2012)
- Bel Ami Vetiver (2013)
- Jour d'Hermes Extrait de Parfum (2013)
- Jour d'Hermes Absolue (2014)
- Le Jardin de Monsieur Li (2015)
- Eau de Neroli Dore (2016)

=== For Le Couvent-Maison de Parfum ===
- Collection les Parfums Signature
  - Mimosa (2021)
  - Tuberosa (2021)
  - Ambra (2021)
  - Vetivera (2022)
  - Peonia (2023)
  - Tonka (2024)
- Collection les Eaux de Parfum Singulieres, en tant que Directeur de Création Olfactive
  - Nubica (2019)
  - Lysandra (2019)
  - Hattaï (2019)
  - Saïga (2019)
  - Heliaca (2019)
  - Theria (2021)
  - Agapi (2022)
- Collection les Eaux de Parfum Remarquables, en tant que Directeur de Création Olfactive
  - Santa Cruz (2019)
  - Portobello (2019)
  - Tinhare (2019)
  - Smyrna (2019)
  - Fort Royal (2019)
  - Kythnos (2019)
  - Palmarola (2019)
  - Anori (2019)
  - Solano (2019)
  - Sperone (2023)
  - Ilhabela (2024)
- Collection les Colognes Botaniques, en tant que Directeur de Création Olfactive
  - Aqua Majestae (2019)
  - Aqua Imperi (2019)
  - Aqua Nymphae (2019)
  - Aqua Minimes (2019)
  - Aqua Palmaris (2020)
  - Aqua Millefolia (2020)
  - Aqua Amantia (2020)
  - Aqua Mahana (2022)

=== For Bulgari ===
- Eau Parfumée au Thé Vert (1992)
- Eau Parfumée au Thé Vert Extrême (1996)

=== For Frédéric Malle ===
- Heaven can wait (2023)
- Angéliques sous la Pluie (2000)
- Cologne Bigarade (2001)
- Bigarade Concentrée (2002)
- L'Eau d'Hiver (2003)
- Rose & Cuir (2019)

=== For L'Artisan Parfumeur ===
- L'Eau d'Ambre (1978)
- La Haie Fleurie du Hameau (1982)
- Ambre Extrême (2001)
- Bois Farine (2003)

=== For Van Cleef & Arpels ===
- First (1976)
- Miss Arpels (1994)

=== For The Different Company ===
- Bois d’Iris (2000)
- Osmanthus (2001)
- Rose Poivrée (2001)
- Bergamote (formerly Divine Bergamote) (2003)

=== For Perris Monte Carlo ===
- Rose de Mai (2019)
- Jasmin de Pays (2019)
- Mimosa Tanneron (2020)
- Lavande Romaine (2020)

=== Others ===
- Essence Rare (1973 and 2018), for Houbigant
- Eau de Campagne (1974), for Sisley
- First (1976) for Van Cleef & Arpels
- Rumba (1988), with Ron Winnegrad, for Balenciaga
- Globe (1990), for Rochas
- Déclaration (1998), for Cartier
- In Love Again (1998), for Yves Saint Laurent
- Aromantic (1999), for Decléor
- Bazar Femme (2002), with Bertrand Duchaufour & Emilie Copperman, for Christian Lacroix
- Blanc (2003), for Paul & Joe
- Colonia Assoluta (2003), with Bertrand Duchaufour, for Acqua di Parma
- Emporio Armani Night for Her (2003), with Lucas Sieuzac, for Giorgio Armani
- Eau de Lalique, with Emilie Copperman, for Lalique
- Amouage Dia pour Femme, for Amouage

=== After Hermes ===
Ellena left Hermes in 2016, and Swiss-born chemist and perfumer Christine Nagel replaced him as Hermes in-house perfumer. Ellena's final fragrances for Hermes were Eau de Néroli Doré and Hermèssence Muguet Porcelaine.

In 2018 Ellena worked with the House of Houbigant, to recreate Essence Rare, a fragrance he had first signed in 1973, his first assignment as a young perfumer in New York.

Ellena returned to creating for Editions de Parfum Frederic Malle, his latest work, "Rose & Cuir," debuting in September 2019. He also became the olfactive director of the brand Le Couvent des Minimes.

In 2019 Ellena also started an ongoing collaboration with Perris Monte Carlo, for whom he has created the Collection de Grasse, an exclusive fragrance collection paying tribute to the history and unique craftmanship of the art of perfumery in Pays de Grasse.

Since 2019, Jean Claude Ellena has been the Olfactory Creative Director of Le Couvent – Maison de Parfum.

== Personal life ==
Ellena's father, brother, and daughter Celine are also perfumers. Known for his signature white shirts, Ellena himself never wears perfume or cologne. His daughter Celine designed the Hermès Home Fragrance Collection.
