= First (Kandersteg) =

Mountain in Switzerland

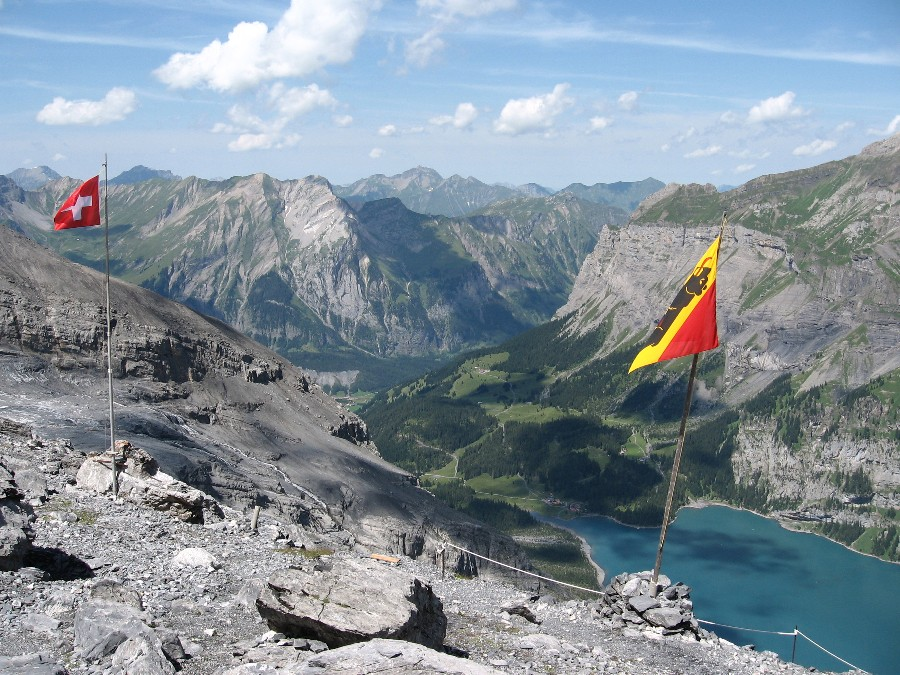
- The First (centre-left) from above the Oeschinensee

Highest point
- Elevation: 2,548 m (8,360 ft)
- Prominence: 137 m (449 ft)
- Parent peak: Chlyne Lohner
- Coordinates: 46°30′17.5″N 7°38′35″E

Geography
- Location within Switzerland
- Location: Bern, Switzerland
- Parent range: Bernese Alps

The First is a mountain of the Bernese Alps, overlooking Kandersteg, in the canton of Bern in Switzerland. First overlooks of the surrounding alpine landscape, including the peaks of the Eiger, Mönch, and Jungfrau.

Its summit can be reached by trail from Adelboden or Kandersteg.
