= First War =

First War may refer to:

- Prehistoric warfare
- World War I (1914–1918)

== Other wars ==
- First Anglo-Afghan War
- First Anglo-Burmese War
- First Anglo-Dutch War
- First Anglo-Maratha War
- First Anglo-Mysore War
- First Anglo-Sikh war
- First Balkan War
- First Barbary War
- First Barons' War
- First Boer War
- First Carlist War
- First Celtiberian War
- First Chechen War
- First Congo War
- Trajan's First Dacian War
- First Franco-Dahomean War
- First Egyptian-Ottoman War
- First Goryeo–Khitan War
- First Indochina War
- First Italian War of Independence
- First Italo-Ethiopian War
- First Jewish–Roman War
- First Macedonian War
- First Margrave War
- First Maroon War
- First Matabele War
- First Messenian War
- First Mithridatic War
- First Northern War
- First Opium War
- First Peloponnesian War
- First Perso-Turkic war
- First Punic War
- First Sacred War
- First Schleswig War
- First Servile War
- First Sino-Japanese War
- First Syrian War
- First Taranaki War
- First War against Napoleon
- First War of Kappel
- First War of Scottish Independence
- First Zhili–Fengtian War

== Music ==
- First War of the World, a 2009 album by Black Messiah

== See also ==
- First Civil War (disambiguation)
