= First Things First Foundation =

American Christian organization founded by Kurt Warner

The First Things First Foundation is a Christian organization founded by the NFL quarterback Kurt Warner and his wife Brenda in May 2001. The name of the organization was inspired by a dialogue between Warner and the media in the postgame interview after the St. Louis Rams won the Super Bowl in January 2000 and Warner was named the game's MVP:

Mike Tirico from ABC: "Kurt, first things first — tell me about the final touchdown pass to Isaac."
Warner: "Well, first things first, I've got to thank my Lord and Savior up above — thank you, Jesus!"

The foundation pays for a week-long trip to Walt Disney World for dozens of children each year. It also has an annual "punt, pass and kick clinic" for children.
