= Chandler Burr =

American journalist

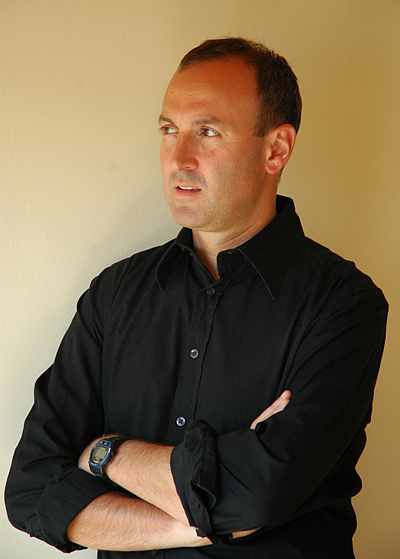
- Burr in 2005
- Born: Chicago, Illinois, U.S.
- Education: Principia College; Johns Hopkins University
- Occupations: Journalist, author, museum curator

Chandler Burr is an American journalist, author, and museum curator.

== Early life and education ==
Born in Chicago and raised in Washington, D.C., Burr graduated from Principia College in Elsah, Illinois. He began his journalism career in 1987 as a stringer in The Christian Science Monitor's Southeast Asia bureau, and later became a Contributing Editor to U.S. News & World Report. Burr has also written for The Atlantic on epidemiology and public health. Burr earned a master's degree in international economics and Japan studies from the Paul H. Nitze School of Advanced International Studies (SAIS) at Johns Hopkins.

== Career ==
=== Writing ===
In 1993, Burr wrote a cover story, "Homosexuality and Biology", for The Atlantic. The story became the basis for his first book A Separate Creation: The Search for the Biological Origins of Sexual Orientation (1996), which investigated sexual orientation research. A Separate Creation was published by Hyperion, a subsidiary of the Walt Disney Company, and its argument that sexual orientation is inborn prompted a call by Southern Baptists to boycott Disney films and theme parks.

In 1996 The Weekly Standard published Burr's article "Why Conservatives Should Embrace the Gay Gene", in which he argued that scientific research demonstrating that sexual orientation is biologically determined supports a conservative view of human nature.

Burr's The Emperor of Scent, published in 2003, tells how the French-Italian scientist Luca Turin originated the theory about the functioning of the sense of smell. As a result, The New Yorker proposed that Burr describe the creation of a perfume. Burr's March 2005 New Yorker article recounted Jean-Claude Ellena's year-long creation, in Paris and Grasse, of Hermès' Un Jardin sur le Nil.

Burr's The Perfect Scent: A Year Inside the Perfume Industry in Paris & New York, published in 2008, describes Ellena's creation of Un Jardin sur le Nil in Paris, and Sarah Jessica Parker's creation of Lovely in New York City under the license aegis of the perfume corporation Coty.

Burr's novel, You Or Someone Like You, was published by Ecco in summer 2009.

From August 2006 until the end of 2010, Burr was perfume critic of The New York Times.

=== Museum and non-profit work ===
In December 2010 he founded the Department of Olfactory Art at the Museum of Arts and Design in New York City. In December 2010, Burr left The New York Times to curate the exhibition "The Art of Scent: 1889-2011" at the Museum of Arts and Design in New York City, which allowed visitors to experience seminal works by some of the greatest scent artists of the late-19th, 20th and early-21st centuries such as Jean-Claude Ellena, Ernest Beaux, and Jacques Cavallier. The New York Times reported that when asked about his refusal to display packaging or bottles, Burr replied "[T]he smell [is] the work of art. I’m opposed to the photon. If you have to see it, I’m not interested."

In 2014 Burr established the Department of Scent Art as an independent 501c3 non-profit arts organization based in New York. The DSA produces exhibitions such as Hyper-Natural: Scent from Art to Design at the National Gallery of Victoria, Melbourne.”

== Personal life ==
The Bogotá newspaper El Tiempo in its edition of 2 December 2011 carried an article on how Burr reportedly had failed to disclose his sexual orientation in petitioning to adopt two Colombian orphans. As a result, the Instituto Colombiano de Bienestar Familiar halted the adoption proceedings, claiming a lack of candor on Burr's part; Burr responded that the children knew about his sexual orientation and "they didn't care". On 13 December 2011 it was reported that the adoptions were made official and that Burr and his adopted sons were reunited.

Burr is an atheist.
