= The First of February =

Studio album by The Last Wish
- Released: 1995
- Recorded: Winter 1994
- Genre: Rock
- Label: Royal Blue Productions
- Producer: Redo Makeshift

The Last Wish chronology
Rooftop Sessions (1993)	The First of February (1995)

Professional ratings
Review scores
Source	Rating
Houston Press	(favorable)

The First of February is the second album by The Last Wish. It was recorded at Deep Dot Studios in Houston, Texas in the winter of 1994. The title of the album refers to an unusual snowfall in Houston. The songs "Royal Blue", "The First Time", "Still Broken", "Artha", "Cattleprod", and "Whispers" have been performed by Justin Furstenfeld and Blue October. "Whispers" was demoed by Blue October and renamed "Pigtail Pretty Baby". "Still Broken" was re-recorded by Blue October during the sessions for their album Sway, but was not included in the final track listing.

Lyrics for the songs on the album were written by Justin Furstenfeld, except Regrets was written by Greg Hammond, Amy's Song and That Morning were written by Amy Immel, and Tangerine was co-written by Amy Immel and Justin Furstenfeld. Photographs for the album art were taken by Gina Melosi.

== Track listing ==
1. "Royal Blue" - 5:11
2. "Paris on Paper" - 4:56
3. "Amy's Song" - 4:07
4. "Turn to Grey" - 4:56
5. "The First Time" - 2:58
6. "Remember" - 5:16
7. "That Morning" - 4:41
8. "Autumn Midnight" - 3:17
9. "Tangerine" - 6:06
10. "Still Broken" - 3:50
11. "Regrets" - 4:53
12. "Down" - 4:51
13. "Hero in Virus" - 5:50
14. "Artha" - 1:38
15. "Cattleprod" - 5:13
16. "Whispers" - 4:44
