= Premiership =

Premiership (the state of being a premier) may refer to:

- The post of premier or prime minister, who is the head of government in many parliamentary systems
- Premier League, the highest-level football league competition in England (previously branded officially as the Premiership between 1993 and 2007)
- Scottish Premiership, the highest level football league competition in Scotland
- The Principality Premiership, the highest-level domestic rugby union competition (but secondary to the multinational Pro14) in Wales
- Cymru Premier, the highest level football league competition in Wales
- NIFL Premiership, the highest-level football league competition in Northern Ireland
- South African Premiership, the highest-level football league competition in South Africa
- Premiership Rugby, known for sponsorship reasons as the Gallagher Premiership, the highest-level rugby union competition in England. "Premiership Rugby" is also the name of the company that operates the league.
- NRL Premiership, the highest level rugby league competition in Australasia
- Scottish Premiership (rugby union), the top amateur-level rugby union competition in Scotland (but below the multinational Pro14 and the semi-professional Super 6)
- The Rugby League Premiership, a title that was available to English rugby league clubs from 1974 to 1997
- Premier Division, the highest level of competition in men's shinty in Scotland. Branded as the Premiership
- Premier Soccer Saturday, RTÉ
- The Mitre 10 Premiership, the top-tier competition within the Mitre 10 Cup in New Zealand rugby union
- The Premiership, ITV's flagship football programme from 2001 to 2004
- In the A-League of Australian soccer, the "premiership" is won by the team finishing first on the league table after the regular season
- the title given to the Australian rules football team that won the title during a particular year via the AFL Grand Final

== See also ==
- Minor premiership, the standard Australian term for what the A-League calls the "premiership"
