= D.S. & Durga =

Perfumery brand

- Founded: 2008; 18 years ago
- Founder: David Seth Moltz; Kavi Ahuja Moltz
- Owner: Manzanita Capital
- Website: www.dsanddurga.com

D.S. & Durga is a perfumery brand founded in 2008 in Brooklyn by husband-and-wife team David Seth Moltz and Kavi Ahuja Moltz. David Seth Moltz is a self-taught perfumer. Kavi Moltz is an architect.

In 2024 the brand was acquired by London-based Manzanita Capital, which also owns Diptyque and MALIN+GOETZ.

== History ==
The brand was first sold in Barneys New York in March 2015, and later Bergdorf Goodman, Galleria, and Liberty; its own retail stores are in Nolita and Williamsburg in New York, and Venice Beach in California.

== Collaborations ==
In 2023 Armando Cabral and D.S. & Durga collaborated on the Mahogany Kora fragrance. In 2023 the brand partnered with The Carlyle on shampoo, conditioner, and body wash inspired by the hotel's honeysuckle-scented soap. D.S. & Durga collaborated with Todd Snyder on a fragrance named Young Dunes, and its products are sold in all Todd Snyder boutiques. In 2018 Duran Duran Collaborate with D.S. & Durga on Limited Edition Fragrance Collection Celebrating Four Decades of Duran Duran's Music.

== Etymology ==
“Durga” was David's pet name for his wife, Kavi. Durga (Sanskrit: दुर्गा) is a Hindu goddess associated with protection, strength, motherhood, destruction, and wars.

== See also ==
- Le Labo
- Diptyque
- Byredo
- Francis Kurkdjian
