= Aesop (brand) =

Australian luxury skin care brand

- Type: Subsidiary
- Industry: Cosmetics
- Founded: 1987; 39 years ago
- Founder: Dennis Paphitis
- Headquarters: Melbourne
- Number of locations: 395 stores
- Products: Skincare, bodycare, haircare, fragrance and homeware
- Revenue: ▲ R$1.9 billion (2020)
- Parent: Natura & Co (2012–23); L'Oréal (2023–present)
- Website: aesop.com

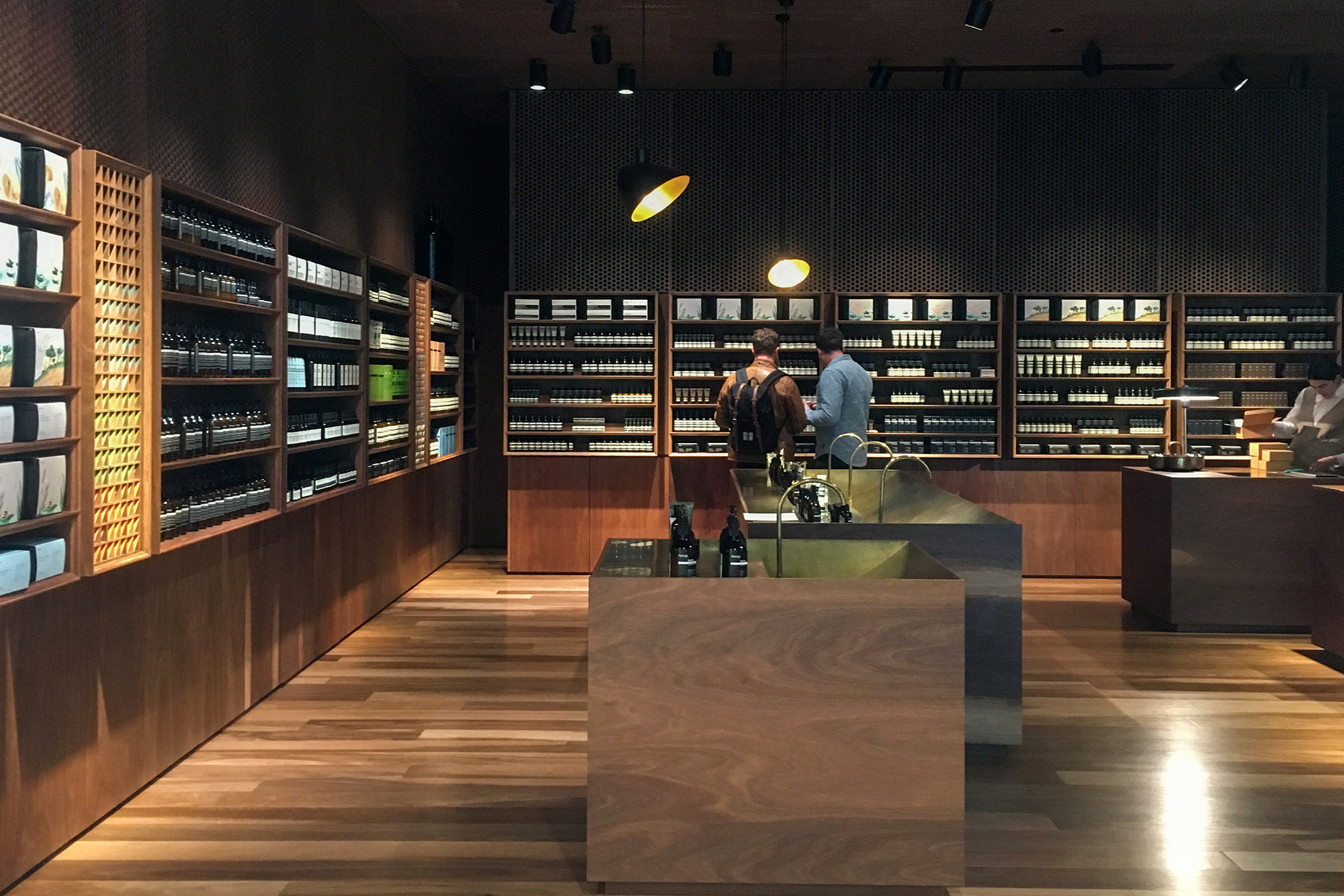
Aesop in Emporium Melbourne, Australia

Aesop (stylised as Aēsop, /iːˈsɒp/ ee-SOP) is an Australian luxury cosmetics brand that produces skincare, haircare and fragrance products. It is headquartered in Collingwood, Victoria, and is a subsidiary of L'Oréal.

Aesop was founded in 1987 by Dennis Paphitis in Armadale, Victoria, where Paphitis owned and operated a hair salon named Emeis in which he blended essential oils into hair products. After continued success, he rebranded to Aesop, naming the brand after the Greek fabulist and storyteller to mock the puffery exhibited in cosmetics industry advertising. He sold the brand to Natura & Co in 2012 while maintaining a role as advisor. L'Oréal bought Aesop for $3.7 billion in 2023.

Each Aesop store has a unique interior design developed in collaboration with architects, interior designers and artists. As of 2023, the brand had nearly 400 points of sale across 27 countries. As of 2017, Aesop produce 83 product formulations and three shaving accessories.

== History ==
Aesop was founded by hairdresser Dennis Paphitis in 1987 in Armadale, Melbourne. Suzanne Santos, whose current job title is Chief Customer Officer, was instrumental in the founding and growth of the company. She was Paphitis's first employee.

In 2010, Harbert Australia Private Equity bought a minority stake in the company; Aesop used the capital injection to fund growth. In December 2012, Aesop sold a 65% stake in its business to Brazilian direct-sales cosmetics company Natura Cosméticos for US$71.6 million (approximately A$100 million). Natura took total ownership in December 2016.

As of 2017, Aesop produced 83 product formulations and three shaving accessories. In September 2018, Aesop launched a luxe homewares product. In 2020, Aesop introduced their first candle product line with three new scents titled Ptolemy, Aganice, and Callippus.

For the company's national and international experience in sustainable development, and eco-friendly products, the Environment Possibility Award conferred the "Award of Green-Trend Leader" to Aesop in 2020. Aesop also became a certified B Corp in 2020, and re-certified in 2024.

In April 2023, it was announced that L'Oréal intended to buy the brand for A$3.7 billion; the acquisition was completed in August.

In December 2024, Michael O'Keeffe, Aesop's chief executive of more than 20 years, left the company.

== Corporate identity ==
The brand has been noted for following a modern approach to prestige branding. This includes not using traditional advertisements or discount sales to promote its products but rather getting noticed and talked about for the design of its products, stores, events and communications.

=== Name, logo, and branding ===
According to founder Dennis Paphitis, the brand's name was inspired by Aesop, the Greek fabulist and storyteller credited with a number of fables. Originally named "Emeis" - which in Greek means "us", and the namesake of Paphitis's hairdressing salon at the time, the brand's name was changed to Aesop in response to the sometimes exaggerated claims made by competitors about their products. Aesop has a minimalist approach to branding, with their logo being a simple transcription of the brand's name in Optima font. Their brand image is described by social entrepreneur and writer Tony Kearney as the key behind its success who credits Aesop with having crafted one of the most beautiful brand programs in existence. After 20 years of operation, the brand retained digital strategist Work & Co to redesign the online experience. The website redesign was critically acclaimed, winning three awards.

=== Store design ===
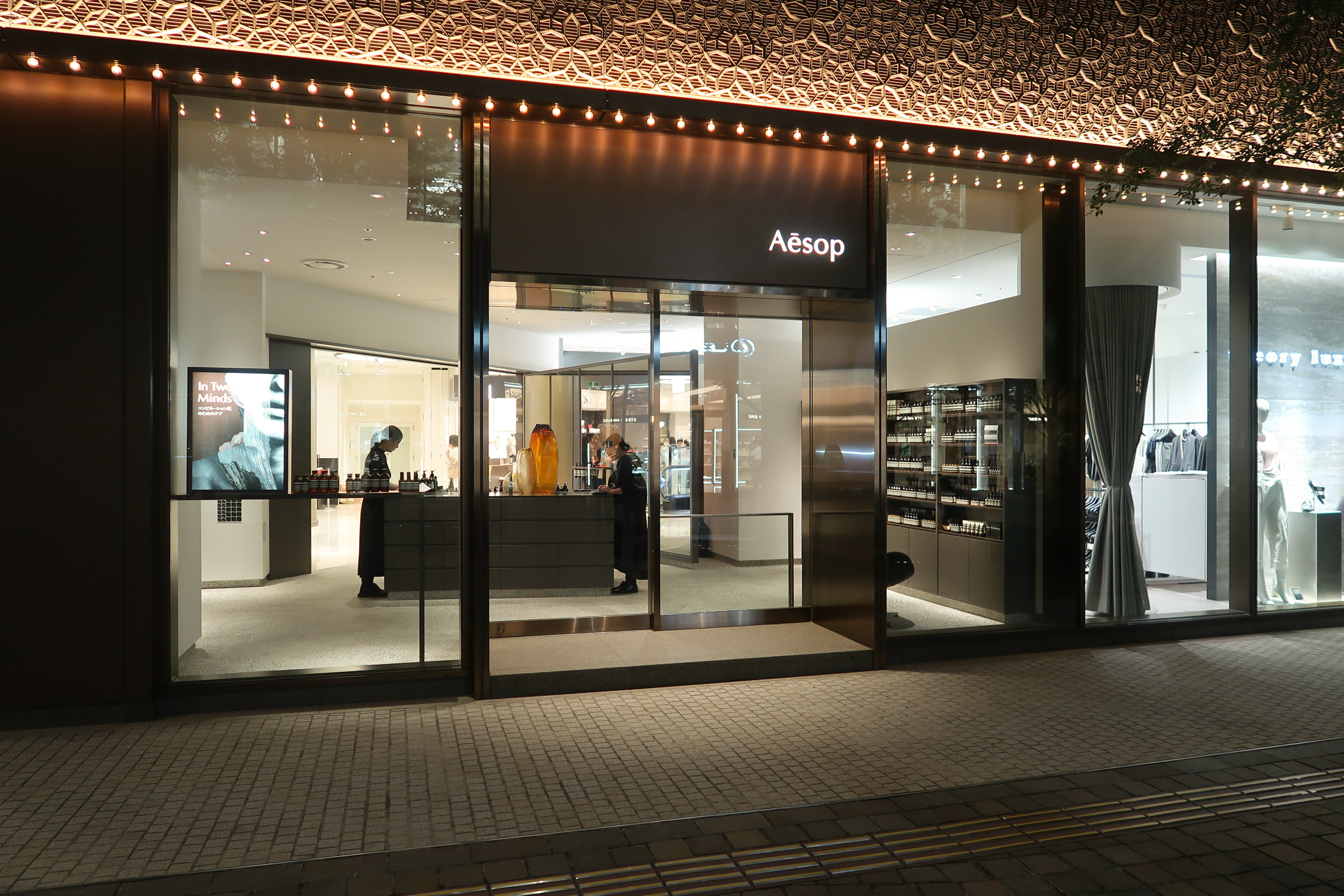
Aesop in Hibiya Chanter, Tokyo, Japan

Aesop retail stores are considered to place local relevance and understatement as a priority in their design. Notable designers and architects have been involved in the creation of Aesop stores. In 2008, British designer Ilse Crawford designed the first London-based store for the brand, located in a Victorian Grade II listed mansion block in Mayfair. The store was noted for its restoration of a historic building with modern additions with brass and ceramic while maintaining original fittings such as the pitch pine floor. In 2021, Odami, a Spanish-Canadian design studio was retained by Aesop to design a new store in Yorkville. Odami described the project as one which paid homage to the history of Yorkville, which retains many homes of Victorian design. The Victorian-style finishing's were noted, as was the design's minimalist approach.

=== Internal culture ===
Aesop has a distinct internal company culture consisting of minimalism and order. Aesop employees are referred to as "Aesopians" and are subject to certain unique company rules and guidelines, such as using only black Moleskine notebooks and black pens and sending all emails with a greeting or pleasantry at its beginning and end. Its offices have been described as "minimal...upmarket prison cell[s]", and employees are not permitted to eat food at or keep personal items on desks. This order is said to stem from Paphitis's inclination for control over Aesop, who has acknowledged "[Aesop] labour[s] over seemingly inane decisions...to make things appear effortless...there's a great deal of energy involved". Other elements of the internal culture include keeping mobile phones on silent inside offices and using Aesop's brand colours on company documents. Former General Manager of Marketing Lisa D'Amico has stated, "the colours used on PowerPoint presentations are really, really important, particularly to the board. If [one is] not OK with that, [they] just won't enjoy [working at Aesop]". Such edicts have been described as "specific yet vague" that make being a potential employee stressful. D'Amico acknowledged Aesop takes "cultural alignment to the nth degree" and noted cultural fit between Aesop and its employees ought to be mutual.

== Points of sale ==
Aesop has over 235 company-owned signature stores across Australia, New Zealand, Japan, Canada, Singapore, Malaysia, Philippines, South Korea, US, Taiwan, Italy, France, The Netherlands, Germany, Switzerland, Austria, Russia, Hong Kong, Sweden, Norway, Spain, Brazil, United Arab Emirates, Belgium and the UK. In the US, it is also available at Nordstrom and Saks Fifth Avenue. In Canada, Aesop's products can be found at Holt Renfrew, Ogilvy, and Saks Fifth Avenue. In Australia, Aesop also operates counters within select Myer department stores as part of an exclusive partnership. These counters closely follow the aesthetics and customer experience of the standalone stores but with a condensed range.

Its largest store in 2017 was its 100.8 m^{2} (1,085 sq ft) space in the Broadway Theater District in Downtown Los Angeles where the walls are lined with reclaimed cardboard tubing from fabric rolls discarded by the nearby Fashion District. Other elements of the store's interior are made entirely from recycled paper.

== See also ==
- Diptyque
- Le Labo
- Byredo
