= Buckhead Village District =

Mixed-use development in Atlanta, Georgia, United States

Coordinates: 33.83942°N 84.379869°W

Buckhead Atlanta logo since May 2011

Streets of Buckhead logo until May 2011

Buckhead Village District (previous named the Streets of Buckhead and Buckhead Atlanta) is a planned 9-acre (3.6 ha) mixed-use development in the Buckhead district in Atlanta, Georgia. The project is a redevelopment of part of the Buckhead Village neighborhood bounded by Peachtree Rd., E. Paces Ferry Rd., Pharr Rd., and N. Fulton Drive. It is located just 1.3 miles (2.1 km) from two of the region's most prominent and upscale malls, Lenox Square and Phipps Plaza.

== History ==
In 2006–07, Ben Carter bought parcels in the area in order to develop the Streets of Buckhead from the existing Buckhead Village area. Demolition of existing structures began in August 2007.

Original plans by developer Ben Carter Properties, LLC called for a $1.5 billion upscale mixed-use development. The Streets of Buckhead was dubbed "Atlanta's new upscale shopping", as it was to feature 600,000 square feet (56,000 m^{2}) of exclusive shopping, 14 fine dining restaurants, two four-star hotels, 350 multimillion-dollar condominiums, and class-A office space. It aimed to be the most exclusive shopping area in the Southern United States.

Originally scheduled for a grand opening in November 2009, by April 2009, work slowdowns pushed the projected opening back to Fall 2011.

In May 2011, San Diego–based OliverMcMillan Inc. purchased the land from Ben Carter Properties and began developing the project. The project was renamed "Buckhead Atlanta" that same month and then, a year later, to “The Shops Buckhead Atlanta.”

In September 2011, McMillan announced a further delay in the project, and that construction would not begin until the end of the first quarter of 2012. McMillan intended to invest $300 million to complete the project in which Ben Carter had already invested $400 million. The total planned development was then targeted at 370 apartments, 300,000 square feet (28,000 m^{2}) of retail space and 90,000 square feet (8,400 m^{2}) of "boutique" office space.

OliverMcMillan planned to change much of the original plans: "not seeking a Rodeo Drive-type development" and "the level of restaurants and retail might be somewhat different". It is to be an "urban village" woven into the Buckhead Community.

The preliminary revised plans called for 300,000 square feet (28,000 m^{2}) of retail and restaurants, 40,000 square feet (3,700 m^{2}) of boutique offices and two 20-story luxury apartment buildings. Plans no longer include the two hotels. Rather than upscale restaurants, the development will target local chefs. A street grid system and street-level cafés and stores are to promote walkability.

In early 2013 construction began after a hiatus of three years. As of July 2014 the project was nearing completion. The first retailers and restaurants opened on September 18, 2014. He told the AJC in 2014 the district was “substantially what we originally planned.”

There were new plans to build a 20-story multi-family tower using mostly mass timber, which will contain 516,000-square-foot with 314 units and 2,400 square feet of retail space.

== The Rebirth of "Buckhead Village District" ==
Amid struggles to attract foot traffic, Jamestown, an Atlanta-based real estate investment and management company, acquired The Shops and hosted a series of town hall meetings where members of the community were invited to "join in discussions on the property and its place in Buckhead." In February 2020 Jamestown announced that the development would change its name to “Buckhead Village District” in homage to the original name of the area, with new signage to be installed.

== Tenants ==
Buckhead Atlanta includes 32 retail stores and restaurants with 12 more tenants set to open by the end of 2015.

=== Retail ===
- Abbey Glass
- Alice + Olivia
- A Bathing Ape
- Bella Cucina
- Billy Reid
- BM Franklin & Co.
- Bonobos
- Brochu Walker
- Brown & Co. Jewelers
- Buckhead Art & Co.
- Carousel Fine Art
- COS
- Diptyque
- Don Purcell
- Emilia George
- FACED the Facial Studio
- Ferguson
- Fetch Park
- Frances Valentine
- Groomed Gentleman's Parlour
- Impossible Currency
- Italian Luxury Interiors
- Jenni Kayne
- Jerimiah James
- KULE
- Le Labo
- Lucchese
- Nail Muse
- Patek Philippe
- rag & bone
- Rails
- Savant Salon
- Theory
- Todd Patrick
- Todd Snyder
- Veronica Beard
- Warby Parker
- Vuori

=== Food and beverage ===
- Boba Craze
- Brush Sushi
- Carmel
- Fado Irish Pub
- Gypsy Kitchen
- Le Bilboquet
- Le Colonial
- Saint Germain
- Shake Shack
- The Southern Gentleman
- Taverna
- Yeppa

== See also ==
- List of shopping malls in the United States
- Lenox Square
- Phipps Plaza
- King of Prussia (mall)
- Bal Harbour Shops
