= Thomas Mason =

Thomas, Tom or Tommy Mason may refer to:

== Politicians ==
- Stevens T. Mason (Stevens Thomson Mason, 1811–1843), also known Tom Mason, founding governor of Michigan, 1835–1840
- Thomas Mason (1753–1800), American businessman, planter, and politician, youngest son of George Mason
- Thomas Mason (New Zealand politician) (1818–1903), New Zealand politician
- Tom Mason (Ontario politician), Green Party candidate
- Tom Mason (Scottish politician) (born 1942), Conservative MSP
- Thomas Mason (MP), MP for Salisbury
- Thomas Mason (burgess), member of the House of Burgesses

== Sports ==
- Tom Mason (footballer) (1886–1954), English football forward (Tottenham Hotspur)
- Tommy Mason (1939–2015), American football player
- Tommy Mason (English footballer) (born 1953), English football midfielder (Brighton & Hove Albion)
- Tommy Mason (New Zealand footballer) (born 1960), New Zealand international footballer (Fulham)
- Tom Mason (American football) (born 1956), American football coach

== Actors ==
- Tom Mason (actor, born 1920) (1920–1980), American chiropractor, actor and producer known for his association with film-maker Ed Wood
- Tom Mason (actor, born 1949) (born 1949), American actor
- Thomas B. Mason (1919–2007), American U.S. attorney and actor

== Others ==
- Thomas Mason (priest) (1580–1619), English writer
- Thomas Monck Mason (1803–1889), flute player, writer, and balloonist
- Thomas Henry Mason (1811–1900), British Admiral
- Thomas Mason (physicist), Canadian-born American physicist
- Tom Mason (Falling Skies), a protagonist of Falling Skies TV series played by Noah Wyle

== Business ==
- Thomas Mason (apparel), British-style shirt company

== See also ==
- Thomas Mayson (disambiguation)
- Thomson Mason (disambiguation)
