= Santal 33 =

Le Labo perfume

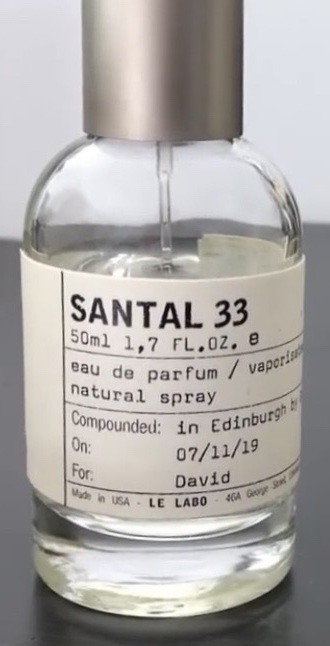
- A 50-milliliter bottle of Santal 33

Fragrance by Le Labo
- Released: 2011
- Label: Le Labo
- Perfumer(s): Frank Voelkl
- Predecessor: Santal 26 (candle, room spray)

Santal 33 is a 2011 sandalwood perfume by niche perfume line Le Labo. It was initially proposed as a personal fragrance by perfumer Frank Voelkl, but Le Labo founders Fabrice Penot and Eddie Roschi cut it from the perfume line for their 2006 launch and asked Voelkl to develop a candle and then a room spray instead, called Santal 26. By 2010, Penot and Roschi acceded to popular demand and asked Voelkl to develop a modified version as a personal perfume, Santal 33, which launched in 2011.

== History ==
When Le Labo launched its original collection in 2006, owners Fabrice Penot and Eddie Roschi, formerly of L'Oréal, included ten fragrances and one sandalwood candle called Santal 26. They considered having a sandalwood fragrance but did not think the proposed version was one of the strongest perfumes in the line and had it made into a candle instead. Even the candle did not initially sell well, and they unloaded their stock onto one interested hotel—the Gramercy Park Hotel—and gave the rest as a wedding gift to a beauty editor who had written a favorable piece about their launch and loved the candle. But eventually hotel guests began asking to purchase the candle, leaving Le Labo scrambling to restock. Penot estimates the candle represented 70% of their turnover in the first few years of the business.

During the first year, Le Labo created a room spray that matched the candle, but despite pleas from Jane Larkworthy, the beauty editor who had been so enamored with the candle, they did not create a wearable fragrance for four years. Finally, Penot was in a bar and noticed someone smelling terrific—when queried, it turned out the man was wearing none other than Santal 26. Penot and Roschi realized they needed a personal fragrance to go with the candle, but by that point had taken a stance that fragrances for people and for rooms should be approached differently. They reached out to Frank Voelkl, the perfumer who had created the original sandalwood fragrance as well as the candle. He too had been wearing the fragrance and getting compliments, but had not been able to convince the owners to launch the perfume. Now they agreed and Voelkl adjusted the formula, creating a scent Penot described as "a little deeper and more comfortable". After two years and 400 prototypes, the fragrance launched in 2011.

== Fragrance ==
Writing in The New York Times, Olivia Fleming wrote that in the year after the launch of Santal 33, Le Labo's independent perfumery felt like "an antidote to the obsession with hype: [...] Like an under-the-radar It bag prized for its unidentifiable features and nondescript branding, Santal 33 quickly became a sort of cult secret, whispered through wafts of sandalwood and cedar, only detected by those in the know". In addition to sandalwood, it also has notes of violet accord, cardamom, iris, ambrox, cedar, and leather.

Within a matter of years, the perfume had "become a predictable presence on the New York City subway, at bars in London, cafes in Paris, even on the beach in Los Angeles. It has been wholly embraced by the fashion flock and A-list celebrities alike"—prominent devotees included television presenter Alexa Chung, Emily Weiss, singer Justin Bieber, actress Emma Roberts as well as many of their fans. "As the GQ designer Griffin Funk recently tweeted, 'At this point it's weird if someone doesn't smell like Le Labo Santal 33'". In Beyoncé's 2016 visual album Lemonade, the singer was depicted burning two Le Labo Santal 26 candles during the sequence for "Sandcastles".

In addition to prominent fans of the fragrance, its diffusion was also furthered by the 2014 purchase of Le Labo by Estée Lauder Companies for $60 million, according to WWD. This brought all Le Labo fragrances into wider distribution and turned Santal 33 into a "beauty-counter mainstay". Lauder's executive group president called it "the icon fragrance of an entire generation, male and female". Writing during the COVID-19 pandemic, Melissa Kirsch recollected Santal 33 as the smell of the subway before stay-at-home orders began:

Once, every third person on the train smelled of the same fragrance, a sandalwood-heavy number called Santal 33 that I learned to associate with fall, with city dwellers in a hurry; the uptown 2 train to Times Square on weekdays at 8 a.m. in the fall was the Santal Express. What does the subway smell like now?

The ubiquity in major US cities drew both more fans and also some complaints. On the one hand, it spawned enthusiasm for sandalwood perfumes as a genre, like Diptyque Tam Dao and Tom Ford Santal Blush; as well as a hunt for more affordable versions. A 100-milliliter bottle of Santal 33 cost $220 at launch in the US in 2011 and by 2019 was up to $275, while the same size bottle of Clean Reserve Sel Santal was $98 or a 50-milliliter bottle of Sarah Jessica Parker Stash, another woodsy fragrance, was $75. A bargain hunter writing for Cosmopolitan found what she swore was a "a dead ringer Santal 33 dupe" for exactly half the price, in Kieran NYC Santal Sky. Investigating a "dupe" recommended on TikTok, Amanda Krause wrote in Business Insider that she did not find it an exact match but preferred the $30 Fine'ry Jungle Santal made by budget brand Target.

But other wearers—or anyone smelling the scent on a frequent basis—had a less positive reaction to the broad popularity. In 2018, performance artist Mur turned the scent into a meme, creating a video of himself dressed as a bottle of Santal 33 and mocking the ubiquity of the scent in New York. Others felt a loss of the once-special scent, enjoying it less even though the scent had not changed. Writing in Vogue, Maya Singer explained this experience in terms of French sociologist Pierre Bourdieu’s concept of distinction: "the exercise of taste that sets you apart from the rabble". Wide popularity meant Santal 33 no longer served to distinguish its wearers' personal taste from that of the crowd on the subway.

In 2022, Costco became an authorized retailer of Santal 33, offering a 3.4 fl oz. bottle for US$224.99, approximately $85 less than the price listed by Le Labo and other retailers at the time.

The scent continued to appear in popular culture. In the 2023 romantic comedy movie Red, White & Royal Blue, the protagonist Alex, son of the U.S. president, wears Le Labo Santal 33. The Mexican musician Peso Pluma named a song from his 2024 album Éxodo after the fragrance. Atlanta artist Benji Blue Bills also raps about his use of the fragrance in his 2024 song of the same name.
