= Armando Cabral =

Armando Cabral is a male supermodel and eponymous footwear brand founder. Born in Guinea-Bissau and raised in Portugal, Armando Cabral produces made in Italy footwear. The brand has brick-and-mortar stores in Lisbon and New York at Rockefeller Center. Armando Cabral footwear is sold at Mr Porter and Bloomingdale’s, and at Todd Snyder. In 2023, Armando Cabral and DS&Durga collaborated on the Mahogany Kora fragrance.

== Personal life ==
His brother Fernando is also a model.
