= Boy Smells =

Perfume brand

- Type: Independent
- Industry: Consumer goods
- Founded: 2016; 10 years ago (Los Angeles, U.S.)
- Founders: Matthew Herman; David Kien
- Headquarters: Los Angeles
- Products: Cosmetics
- Website: https://boysmells.com/

Boy Smells is a perfumery brand founded in 2016 in Los Angeles by Matthew Herman and David Kien.

The brand regularly collaborates with social media influencers — such as Vanillamace and Nicolas Sturniolo — to appeal to Gen Z consumers.

== History ==
Boy Smells was founded in 2016 as scented candle brand for customers who are "design-oriented with a touch of queerness. The brand focused on scents that broke from traditional gender norms.

The brand saw an increase in scented candle sales in relation to COVID-19 quarantining.

In 2021, in collaboration with Robertet Group, the brand expanded into perfumes with its five-variant Cologne de Parfum collection by perfumer Jérôme Epinette.

Following a surge in interest in poppers in the wake of Troye Sivan's 2023 song "Rush," Boy Smells released its Citrush candles and perfumes.

In 2025, the brand underwent a controversial rebranding. The move was criticized by some as "straightwashing," or abandoning of the brand's LGBTQ+ origins, in order to appeal to Gen Alpha and Gen Z. The brand's sculptural black-and-pink bottles were replaced with colorful glass bottles, derided by some as resembling electronic cigarettes. As party of its rebranding, Boy Smells opened a pop-up boutique in New York City's trendy SoHo neighborhood, adjacent to fragrance competitors such as Byredo and Le Labo.

== Products ==
=== Perfumes ===
- Cashmere Kush (2022, discontinued)
- Citrush (2025)
- Citrush Gold (2026) – collaboration with Nicolas Sturniolo
- Coco Cream (2025)
- Coco Hinoki (2026)
- Cowboy Kush (2022)
- Flor de la Virgen (2021, discontinued)
- Hinoki Fantôme (2022)
- Italian Kush (2022, discontinued)
- Les (2023, discontinued)
- Marble Fruit (2021, discontinued)
- Peachy Oudy (2025)
- Red Hot (2025)
- Rose Load (2021, discontinued)
- Rosy Cheeks (2025)
- Solar Drip (2026)
- Suede Pony (2021, discontinued)
- Sugar Baby (2025)
- Tantrum (2021, discontinued)
- Vanilla Era (2025) – collaboration with Vanillamace
- Violet Ends (2025)
- Woodphoria (2022)

=== Hair and Body Mists ===
- Cherry Slay
- Chestnut Cheeks
- Citrush
- Cream Dream
- Cuc
- Soft Wood
- Water Melons

=== Candles and reed diffusers ===
- Ash
- Citrush
- Coco Cream
- Coco Hinoki
- Cowboy Kush
- Hinoki Fantôme
- Kush
- Les
- Vanilla Era
- Violet Ends
- Woodphoria

== See also ==
- Byredo
- Diptyque
- Le Labo
