= List of companies based in Los Angeles County =

t This is a list of notable corporations headquartered in Los Angeles County, California. The table is arranged alphabetically by company.

Company	Industry	City
Activision Blizzard	video games	Santa Monica
Age of Learning	educational technology	Glendale
Alo Yoga	fashion	Beverly Hills
Amazon MGM Studios	film and television	Culver City
American Honda Motor Company	motor vehicles	Torrance
Anastasia Beverly Hills	cosmetics	Los Angeles (Westwood)
Beats Electronics	consumer electronics	Culver City
Belkin	consumer electronics	El Segundo
Beyond Meat	food production	El Segundo
Big 5 Sporting Goods	sporting goods	El Segundo
Boy Smells	perfumery	Los Angeles (Pico-Union)
BYD North America	motor vehicles	Pasadena
Capital Group Companies	financial services	Los Angeles (Downtown)
Cathay Bank	financial services	Los Angeles (Chinatown)
Cedars-Sinai Health System	medical care	Los Angeles (Beverly Grove)
The Coffee Bean & Tea Leaf	food service	Los Angeles (Downtown)
Creative Artists Agency	entertainment	Los Angeles (Century City)
Curacao	retail	Los Angeles (Westlake)
Delta Scientific	defense & security	Palmdale
Deluxe Entertainment Services Group	entertainment	Burbank
Dine Brands Global	food service	Pasadena
DreamWorks Animation	film and television	Glendale
Edison International	public utility	Rosemead
Erewhon	groceries	Vernon
Fabletics	fashion	El Segundo
Fandango Media	online media	Beverly Hills
Farmers Insurance Group	financial services	Los Angeles (Woodland Hills)
Fashion Nova	fashion	Beverly Hills
Grindr	technology	West Hollywood
Guess	fashion	Los Angeles (Downtown)
Guitar Center	musical instrument sales	Westlake Village
Harbor Freight Tools	tools and equipment	Calabasas
Health Net	managed health care	Los Angeles (Woodland Hills)
Herbalife	multi-level marketing	Los Angeles (Downtown)
The Honest Company	retail	Los Angeles (Playa Vista)
Hot Topic	retail	Industry
Hulu	entertainment	Burbank
Huy Fong Foods	food products	Irwindale
ICANN	nonprofit	Los Angeles (Playa Vista)
In-N-Out Burger	food service	Baldwin Park
Insomniac Games	video games	Burbank
Inter-Con Security	private security	Pasadena
Jollibee Group North America	food service	West Covina
K-Swiss	shoes	Glendale
Live Nation Entertainment	entertainment	Beverly Hills
KB Home	homebuilding	Los Angeles (Westwood)
Korn Ferry	professional services	Los Angeles (Century City)
Legendary Pictures	motion picture	Burbank
Los Angeles Apparel	fashion	Florence-Graham
Mattel	entertainment	El Segundo
MGA Entertainment	entertainment	Los Angeles (Chatsworth)
Molina Healthcare	healthcare	Long Beach
Norms Restaurants	food service	Bellflower
Oprah Winfrey Network	entertainment	West Hollywood
Panavision	motion picture equipment	Los Angeles (Woodland Hills)
Paramount Pictures	film and television	Los Angeles (Hollywood)
Panda Express	food service	Rosemead
Princess Cruises	travel tours	Santa Clarita
Razor USA	personal transport	Cerritos
Revry	entertainment	Glendale
Rocket Lab	aerospace	Long Beach
Riot Games	video games	Santa Monica
ServiceTitan	technology	Glendale
SHEIN USA	fashion	Los Angeles (Downtown)
Skechers	footwear and apparel	Manhattan Beach
Skims	fashion	Los Angeles (Hollywood)
Snap Inc	social media	Santa Monica
Sony Pictures	entertainment	Culver City
Southern California Gas Company	public utility	Los Angeles (Downtown)
Tetra Tech	professional services	Pasadena
Trader Joe's	retail (grocery)	Monrovia
TrueCar	technology	Santa Monica
Tutor Perini	construction	Los Angeles (Sylmar)
United Talent Agency	entertainment	Beverly Hills
Universal Pictures	film and television	Universal City
Vast	aerospace	Long Beach
The Walt Disney Company	entertainment	Burbank
Warner Bros.	film and television	Burbank
Wham-O	toys	Carson
WME Group	entertainment	Beverly Hills
World of Wonder	entertainment	Los Angeles (Hollywood)
Zankou Chicken	food service	Vernon

== Former companies ==
- AECOM, engineering and construction; moved to Dallas, Texas in 2021
- American Apparel, fashion; physical stores were closed and the brand was integrated into Gildan in 2017
- Andrew Christian, fashion; defunct 2025
- CBRE Group, real estate management; moved to Dallas, Texas in 2020
- Dollar Shave Club, consumer packaged goods; moved to Durham, North Carolina in 2025
- Forever 21, fashion; defunct 2025
- Nestlé, food processing; moved to Rosslyn, Virginia in 2017.
- Public Storage, storage; moved to Frisco, Texas in 2026
- SpaceX, aerospace; moved to Starbase, Texas in 2024
- Toyota Motor North America, motor vehicles; moved to Plano, Texas in 2017
