= Lenox Square =

Shopping mall in Atlanta, Georgia

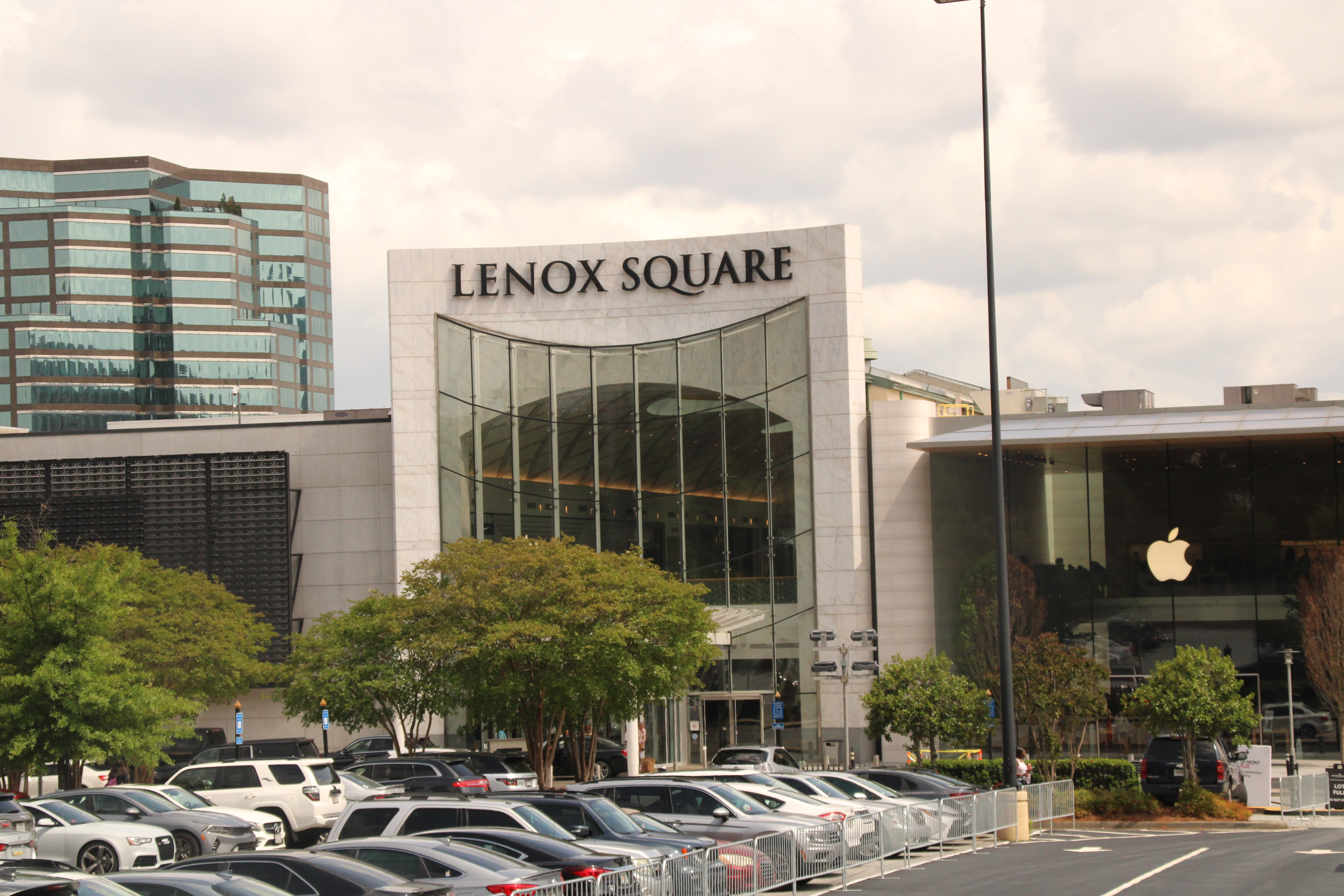
- Mall entrance (2022)
- Interactive map of the Lenox Square area

General information
- Status: Operational
- Location: Atlanta, Georgia, U.S., 3393 Peachtree Road NE
- Coordinates: 33.84591°N 84.36187°W
- Opened: August 3, 1959; 66 years ago
- Owner: Simon Property Group
- Operator: Simon Property Group

Technical details
- Floor count: 4 (3 in Neiman Marcus)
- Floor area: 1,558,678 square feet (144,805.9 m^{2}) of gross leasable area

Design and construction
- Developer: Noble Properties

Other information
- Number of stores: 198
- Number of anchors: 3
- Public transit access: MARTA: Gold Line at Lenox; Red Line at Buckhead

Website
- simon.com/mall/lenox-square

Lenox Square is a shopping mall in the Buckhead district of Atlanta, Georgia, United States. It is adjacent to Phipps Plaza, both of which are owned by Simon Property Group. Lenox Square spans 1,558,678 square feet (144,805.9 m^{2}) of gross leasable area and has 198 tenants, making it the third-largest mall in Georgia. It is anchored by Bloomingdale's, Macy's, and Neiman Marcus, and is connected to the JW Marriott Buckhead. Lenox Square marks the start and finish lines of the Peachtree Road Races, with the mall being the starting line of the southbound run in July, and the finish line of the January northbound run.

== History ==
=== Establishment ===
Lenox Square was the work of Ed Noble, a former developer from Kansas City, Missouri, whose company J. Noble Properties, acquired the site in 1956. Groundbreaking for the shopping center occurred in July 1957, and it was completed on June 29, 1958. The public opening ceremony for Lenox Square was held on August 3, 1959.

The three-level Mall, Plaza and Market featured 800,000 square feet (74,000 m^{2}) of retail space, and was anchored by Rich's, Davison's, and a Colonial Stores supermarket. There were 52 original tenants, including a bowling alley, indoor golf driving range, and a Kresge five and dime store. The Mall Level concourse featured several sculptures depicting Uncle Remus characters, such as Br'er Fox, Br'er Frog and the Tar Baby. A movie theater opened on the Market Level in June 1963.

=== Early expansions ===
In keeping with a then-current retail trend, a major renovation and expansion in the early 1970s enclosed the entire shopping center. It included a new wing and the addition of the first Neiman Marcus location outside of Texas and Florida. It is still the company's only location in the state.

A second expansion completed in 1980 added a three-level section at the back of the mall which included a food court. This replaced the previous open-air Plaza Court and supermarket. Lenox Square then encompassed 1.04 million leasable square feet. The new food court was soon joined by a 19-story, 370,000 square-foot (gross), class-A office building, a twin-like 24-story hotel, 1,800 space, five-level partially subterranean combined hotel-office parking garage (two below ground), and 800-space four-level retail pre-cast concrete parking deck. These were adjacent to MARTA's Lenox transit station, which opened in December 1984.

Davison's, owned by Macy's since 1924, was rebranded as Macy's in 1986. In 1991, Rich's relocated their flagship store to Lenox Square from downtown Atlanta. In 1995, the mall underwent its largest expansion, adding a second story above the original Mall Level, making Lenox Square the largest shopping center in Georgia, with 1.457 million square feet (140,000 m²) divided among 200 stores and restaurants. However, this distinction was soon relinquished to the newly built, 1.7-million-square-foot (160,000 m^{2}) Mall of Georgia in 1999.

=== Effects of Macy's conversions ===
The Macy's store, one of the company's flagship stores.

In 2003, Federated Department Stores began integrating the Macy's name with their other regional department-store brands, including Rich's. Following the news, the Lenox Macy's location closed, and the building (along with the location at Perimeter Mall) was renovated extensively to house the first Bloomingdale's in the South, which opened in October 2003.

In 2005, Federated Department Stores dropped the regional names of all of their department stores. The former Rich's-Macy's location at Lenox Square became the flagship of Macy's Central until all of the company's divisions had consolidated into one.

=== Later expansions ===
A significant 2007 expansion enlarged the existing Neiman Marcus by 52,000 square feet (4,800 m^{2}) and added a 36,000-square-foot (3,300 m^{2}) upper level to the wing connecting the store to the main mallway. The shopping center then housed 1.545 million leasable square feet and 240 stores and services. In the fall 2013 another renovation took place in the mall with additions of both exterior and interior with new lighting, landscaping, windows, and much more. The renovations were completed in 2014.

In 2023, after the government lockdown, Lenox Square announced their newest additions, among them Psycho Bunny, Savage X Fenty, Cotton On, Moncler, Sandro, The Webster, and Ferrari, in addition to an entirely new store format for Apple. It also boasts the largest Pottery Barn in existence, as well as one of the largest Forever 21 stores in the southeastern United States.

== Economic impact ==
Lenox Square is the third-largest shopping mall in the state, as well as one of the largest in the Southeast. Only the Mall of Georgia and Perimeter Mall have a larger gross leasable area. Visited by more than 35 million people a year, Lenox Square is one of the most popular and profitable retail centers in the United States. Together with Phipps Plaza, an estimated $1 billion was generated in 2007. An estimated 40% of all visitors to the shopping center in 2009 were tourists.

The area around Lenox has grown immensely in the decades since its opening, with expanding retail developments and over 75 restaurants within a 1-mile radius. In addition, Phipps Plaza is located in the northeast section of Lenox Square across Peachtree Road. Vehicular traffic around Lenox is excessive, and the streets are confusing for those unfamiliar with the area. Georgia 400 opened in 1993, restricting traffic to and from the west after its construction eliminated many existing roads. However, the Buckhead Uptown Connection, whose free shuttle-bus service around Buckhead, is available, supported voluntarily by a self-taxing district (Buckhead CID) which includes Lenox, and by GRTA and other agencies. The proposed Peachtree Streetcar initiative would also extend free or low-fare streetcars to Lenox in the north, through midtown and downtown, and south to a proposed mixed-use redevelopment around historic Fort McPherson, 14 miles (23 km). MARTA, the city's main mass-transit system, provides one station across the street from the JW Marriott, as well as Buckhead station a quarter of a mile to the northwest on Peachtree Road.

== In pop culture ==
In 2000, the Christmas celebration of the Rich's Great Tree moved to the flagship store from Underground Atlanta, after having been held downtown for decades.

Beginning in 2025, it is the starting point of the summer southbound running—and starting in 2025, the finishing point of the winter northbound running—of the 10-kilometer Peachtree Road Race, one of the largest 10-kilometer races in the world.

== Gallery ==
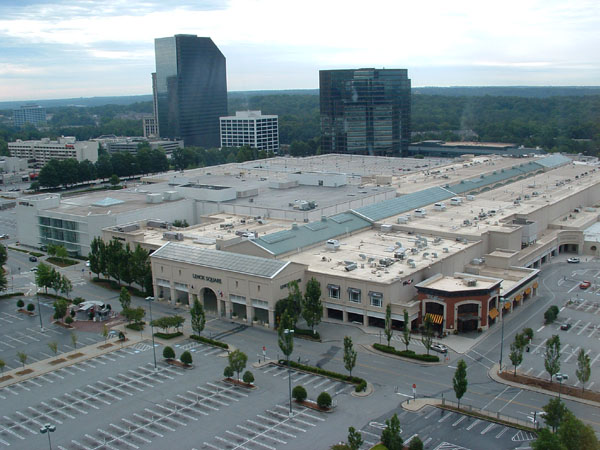
Lenox Square Mall, Peachtree Road front before renovations (2006)

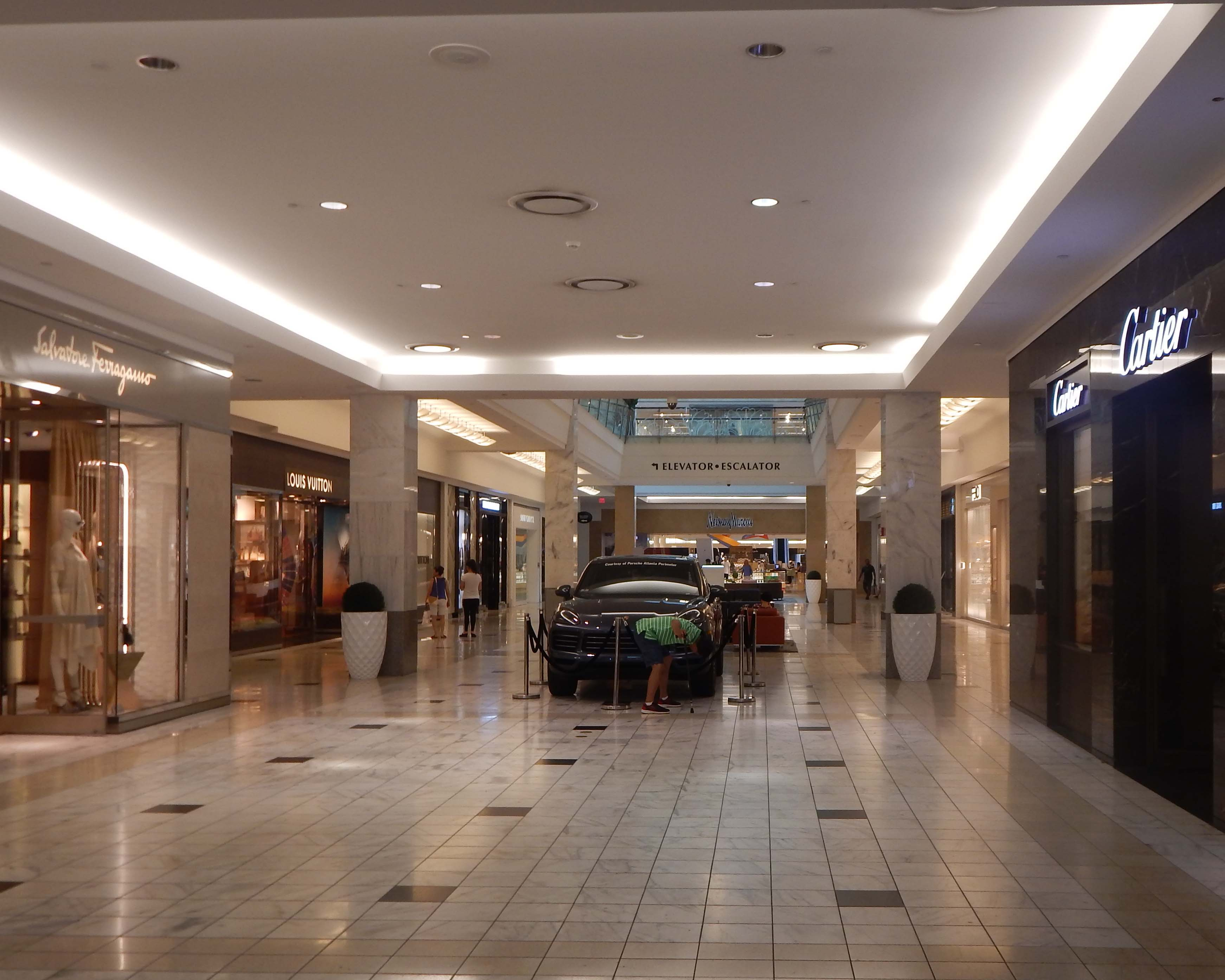
Interior of mall looking toward the Neiman Marcus wing (2019)

== See also ==
- List of shopping malls in the United States
- Phipps Plaza
- Buckhead Village District
