= Annie Stevens Perkins =

American writer

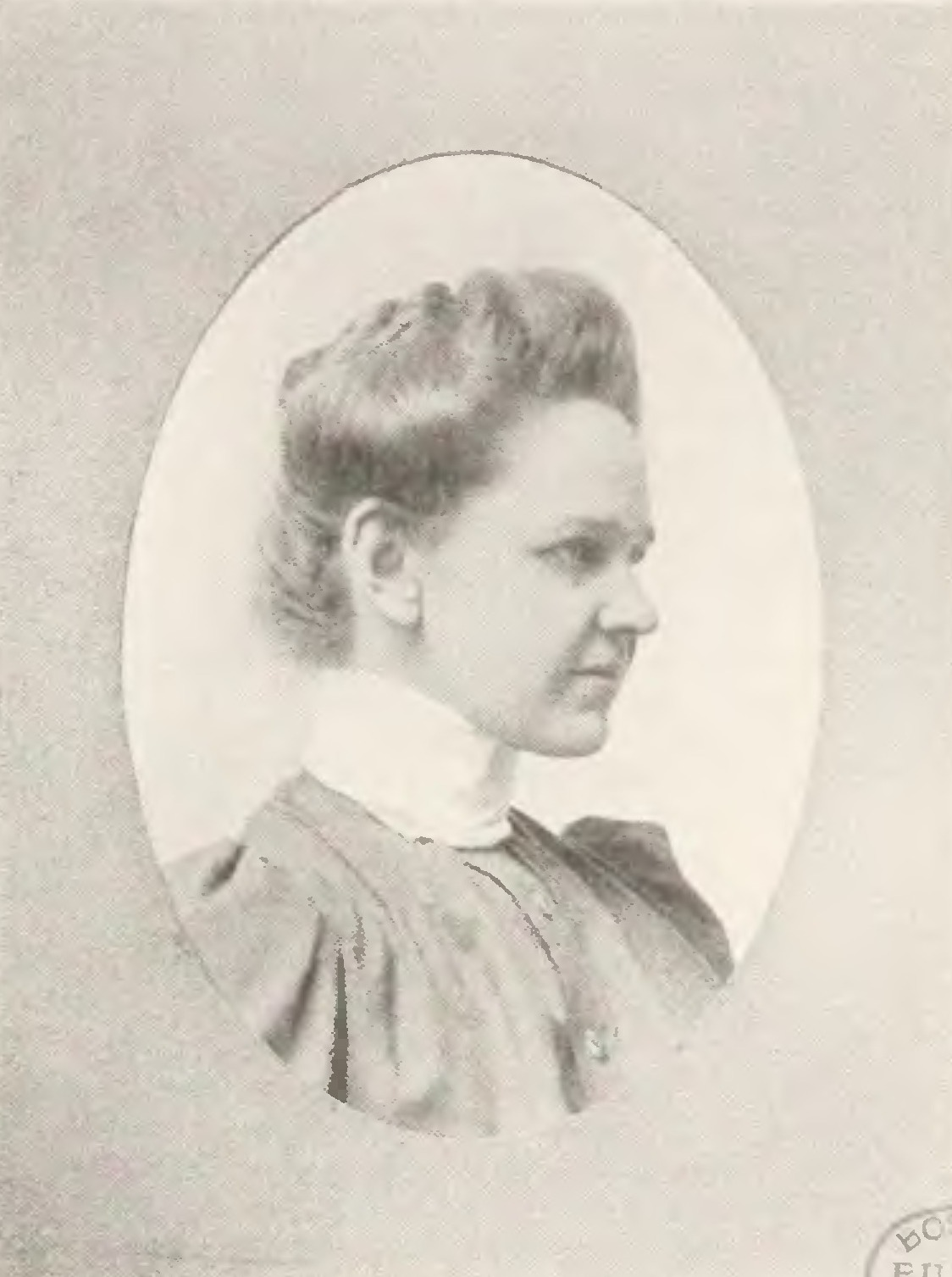
- Photo in Sketches of representative women of New England, 1904
- Born: Annie Batchelder Stevens; April 12, 1868; Salem, Massachusetts, U.S.
- Died: May 22, 1946 (aged 78); Boston, Massachusetts, U.S.
- Education: Somerville High School; Salem Normal School
- Occupation: writer
- Spouses: John Winslow Perkins (m. 1889, died); Henry Webster Jackson (m. 1924)
- Children: John
- Writing career
- Language: English
- Genres: short stories; poetry; juvenile literature

Annie Stevens Perkins (née, Stevens; after first marriage, Perkins; after second marriage, Jackson; April 12, 1868 – May 22, 1946) was an American writer. Her works include, Thoughts of Peace, Appointed Paths, and Book of Poems, as well as Arctic hospitality: a play.

== Early life and education ==
Annie Batchelder Stevens was born in Salem, Massachusetts, April 12, 1868. She was the daughter of Charles Kimball and Mary E. (Batchelder) Stevens. When she was a year old, the family removed from Salem to Somerville, where she lived nearly sixteen years, and attended the primary, grammar and high schools. She had fond memories of her Prescott School life, which was spent wholly under the principalship of Gordon A. Southworth. She also attended Somerville High School, completing half of the college course. Perkins began to write verse at the age of eight. Her first published work appeared in the Radiator, the Somerville High School paper, in 1882. She was a member of its editorial staff.

In June, 1884, the family removed to Lynnfield from which town Perkins attended the Salem Normal School (now Salem State University), completing the course in two years and graduating in June, 1887, being the poet of her class. The following year, at the triennial gathering of the alumni of the school, she was invited to write and read the poem.

== Career ==
Perkins taught in the public school for a short time previous to marriage, and had many private pupils.

Her early work, both stories and verse, was published in the Salem Gazette, Watchman, Golden Rule, the Silver Cross, the Contributor, and other periodicals. She was for a considerable time connected with the Daily Evening Item, "Lynn", as correspondent from her town, sustaining pleasant relations with that paper, as also, in the same capacity, with the Citizen and Banner, Wakefield, Massachusetts and was for a number of years doing regular work for the Normal Instructor, New York City, contributing exercises, verse, reports, articles, and songs. Primary Plans, the periodical published by the same house, used much of her work, and the editor gave her charge of the music page, which appeared regularly, and to which she contributed original rote and motion songs. She was inspired by the work of Professor S. Henry Hadley, supervisor of music of Somerville, and Dr. Daniel B. Hagar, of Salem Normal School, with regard to the fostering of her musical tastes. Professor George F. Wilson, supervisor of music in Wakefield and Beverly schools, used verse written by Perkins for his songs for different grades, requesting it as needed. Perkins' work for the Suburban brought her considerable local prominence, the series of illustrated articles on "The Pipe Organ in Suburban Homes" having attracted much favorable notice. Mr. and Mrs. Perkins were enthusiastic camera workers, especially interior work. The Suburban published a considerable amount of their work in this line. Besides the illustrated work, her stories and songs appeared from lime to time in that periodical. As editor of the department of "The Home and the School," in the Suburban, Boston, Perkins had an opportunity for fostering co-operation of parents and teachers.

Stories were published for the children's page of Youth's Companion, Our Little Ones, the Well-spring, and other periodicals. Through Mrs. Bemis, editor of the Normal Instructor, New York, Perkins was some time ago put into touch with Dr. Mary Wood-Allen, of the American Mother, to which magazine Perkins became a contributor of sketches, juvenile stories, and articles on the training of children from the mother-teacher point of view. In reference to her style of writing, Perkins said:—" If there is some word I want to speak to any friend or friends, I simply tell it as sweetly as I know how in verse, and that is all." A quatrain which appeared in the Teachers' World with other verses, was used as a memory gem in many schools, and was proven to be a favorite with hundreds of little pupils. It reads:—

"When the beautiful stars peep out one by one,
As I look far up and away,
How sweet to be able to whisper to God,
I've made some one happy to-day!"

Thoughts of Peace, a book of verse, and Appointed Paths, a story for girls, were published by James H. Earle, of Boston. These had positive reviews by the Congregationalist and other papers, notably, Teachers World (1897) commented:— "Appointed Paths, by Annie Stevens Perkins, is a good, wholesome, elevating story, full of wise counsel and stimulating thought. The story is well told and interest is sustained to the last chapter. It is a good book for the home circle."

Perkins was a member of the New England Woman's Press Association, and of the Kosmos Club of Wakefield. She wrote many poems for public occasions in her town, such as a poem written and read on the occasion of the dedicating of the new Town Hall being published in the History of Lynnfield. A poem written in honor of the naming of the Daniel Townsend Chapter of the Daughters of the American Revolution (D. A. R.), Lynn, was read by her at the exercises in the old Town Hall and afterward, by request, at an afternoon meeting of the D. A. R. at their headquarters in Boston. At the Old Home Day exercises of Lynnfield, held at Suntaug Lake in August, 1903, she also read a poem written for the occasion.

== Personal life ==
On November 28, 1889, she married John Winslow Perkins, of Lynnfield, and went to live in the cottage built for the young couple on the Perkins farm, which has been in the family since 1700, this being the date of the erection of the homestead. Mr. and Mrs. Perkins had one child, a son named John (1898–1910). Secondly, on May 20, 1924, she married Henry Webster Jackson.

As a member of the Congregational Church of Lynnfield Centre, Perkins found opportunity for religious work, having a class of young women in the Bible school and serving as clerk of the church, besides assisting in the music on Sundays.

Annie Stevens Jackson died May 22, 1946, in Boston.

== Selected works ==
- Appointed paths : a novel, 1896
- Thoughts of peace, 1891
