= Phipps Plaza =

Shopping mall in Georgia, U.S.

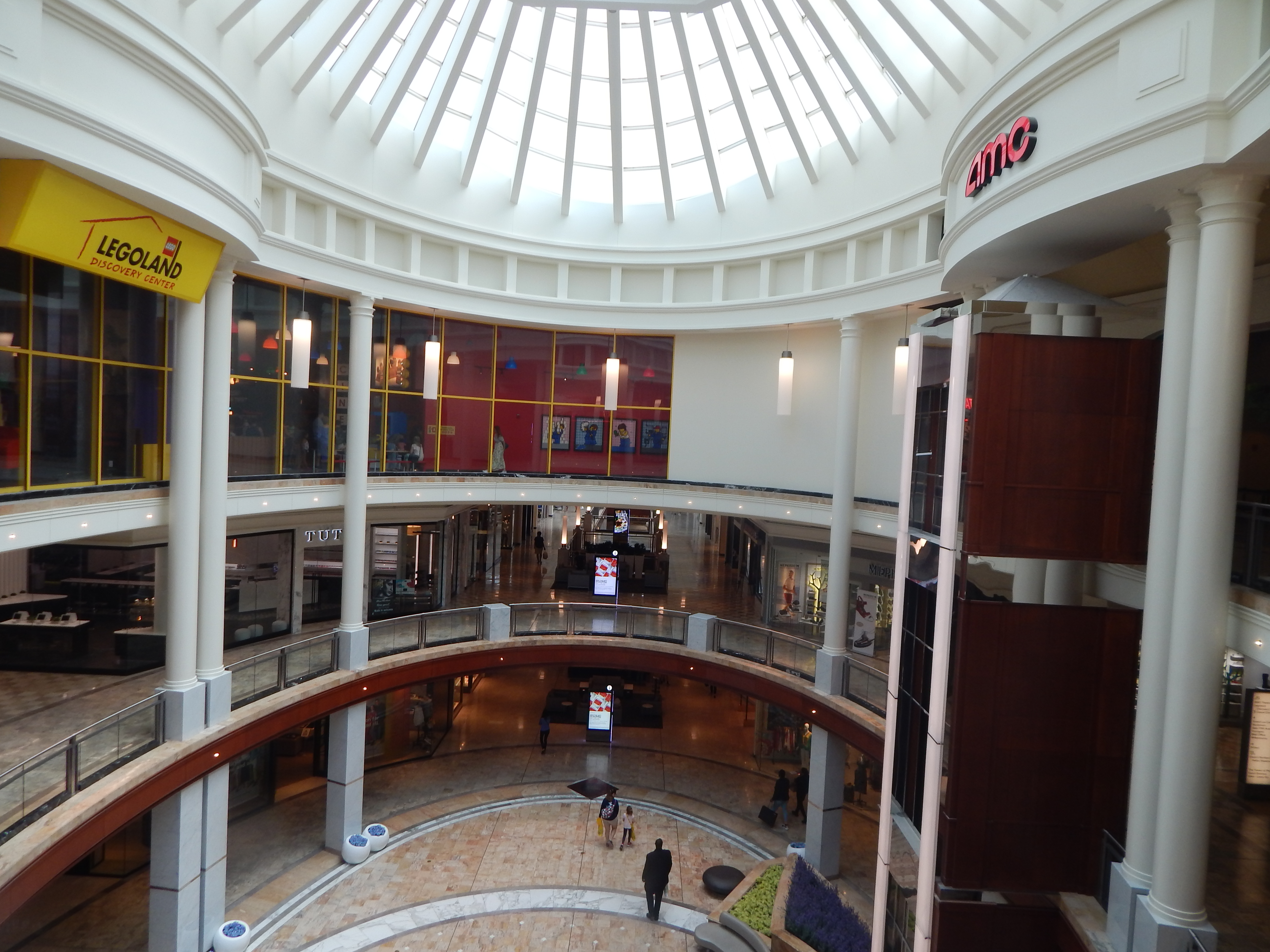
- Mall interior (2019)
- Interactive map of the Phipps Plaza area

General information
- Status: Operational
- Location: Atlanta, Georgia, U.S., 3500 Peachtree Road NE
- Coordinates: 33.85312°N 84.36217°W
- Opened: 1969; 57 years ago
- Owner: Simon Property Group
- Operator: Simon Property Group

Technical details
- Floor count: 3
- Floor area: 823,053 square feet (76,464.1 m^{2}) of gross leasable area

Design and construction
- Developer: Ogden Phipps

Other information
- Number of stores: 102
- Number of anchors: 2

Website
- simon.com/mall/phipps-plaza

Phipps Plaza is a shopping mall in the Buckhead district of Atlanta, Georgia, United States. It is adjacent to Lenox Square, both of which are owned by Simon Property Group. Phipps Plaza spans 823,053 square feet (76,464.1 m^{2}) of gross leasable area and has 102 tenants, including anchor stores Nordstrom and Saks Fifth Avenue. It is also beside the Phipps Tower office building.

== History ==
Phipps Plaza was developed by financier Ogden Phipps and opened in stages. The three-story Saks Fifth Avenue anchor store opened first, on August 12, 1968. The two-story mall opened on March 20, 1969, the first multi-level mall in Atlanta, aiming to become the South's leading shopping destination. The three-story Lord & Taylor anchor store was the final portion of the mall to open, on October 15, 1969. The mall's cinema, the Phipps Plaza Theatre, opened with a single screen on December 19, 1969, showing the film Bob & Carol & Ted & Alice. A second screen, known as the Penthouse, opened on December 26, 1973, and a third screen opened on March 2, 1975.

The mall was sold to Wachovia in July 1975 for approximately $8 million, with the bank acting as trustee for the pension fund of Southern Bell. It was sold again in 1985 to The Equitable Life Assurance Society, which renovated the mall in 1991 at a cost of $140 million, with work completed in September 1992. The renovation added a third anchor, Birmingham, Alabama-based Parisian, on the site of the demolished 3-screen theater. A new 14-screen AMC theatre was added, along with an 8-bay food court, new elevators, and a third level of shops. The remodeled mall celebrated its grand reopening on November 18, 1992. New York-based Corporate Property Investors (CPI) bought the mall in October 1997.

In September 1998, the Simon DeBartolo Group bought the mall, along with five other Atlanta-area malls, including Lenox Square and Northlake Mall, as part of its $5.78 billion acquisition of CPI. Lord & Taylor closed in February 2004 and was replaced by Nordstrom in March 2005. Belk bought the Parisian chain in 2006, and their anchor store was converted to Belk in September 2007. In 2012, the third floor food court was renovated and reopened as a Legoland Discovery Center.

Belk closed on July 31, 2018. Simon Property Group demolished the Belk anchor store and replaced it with a 150-room Nobu Hotel and restaurant, a 300,000 square foot Class A office tower, a 90,000 square foot Life Time Athletic facility and a 30,000 square foot food hall. The hotel and gym both opened in 2022.

In 2023 Phipps Plaza announced several new additions, including Balmain, Celine, Fendi, Etro, Brunello Cucinelli, Canada Goose, Hermès, and Alexander McQueen.

== Architecture ==
The mall is known for its interior décor, which consists of mahogany walls, marble floors, glass elevators, chandeliers, and a massive, carpeted staircase.

== List of anchor stores ==
Name	No. of floors	Year opened	Year closed	Notes
Belk		2007	2019	Replaced Parisian
Life Time		2019	—N/a	New construction on former Belk site
Lord & Taylor		1969	2004	
Nobu Hotel		2022	—N/a	New construction on former Belk site
Nordstrom		2005	—N/a	Replaced Lord & Taylor
Parisian		1992	2007	
Saks Fifth Avenue		1969	—N/a	

== Gallery ==
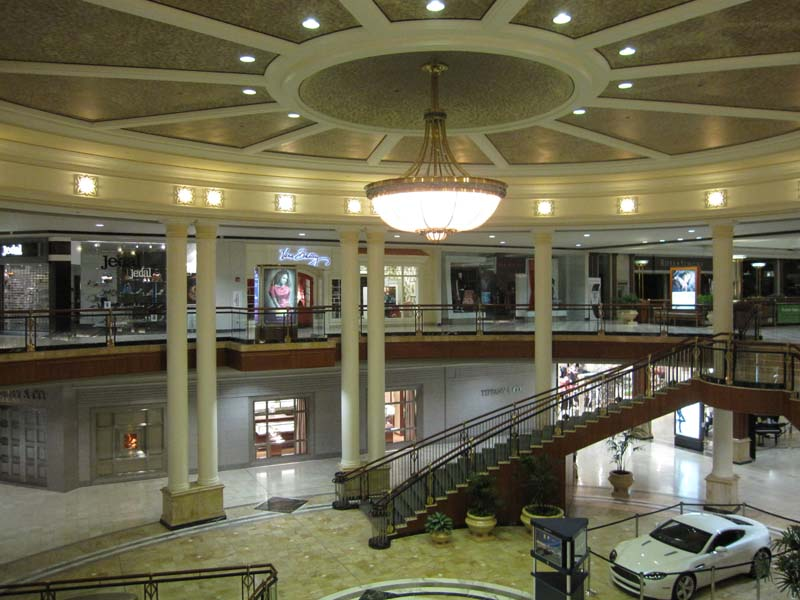
Mall interior (2009)

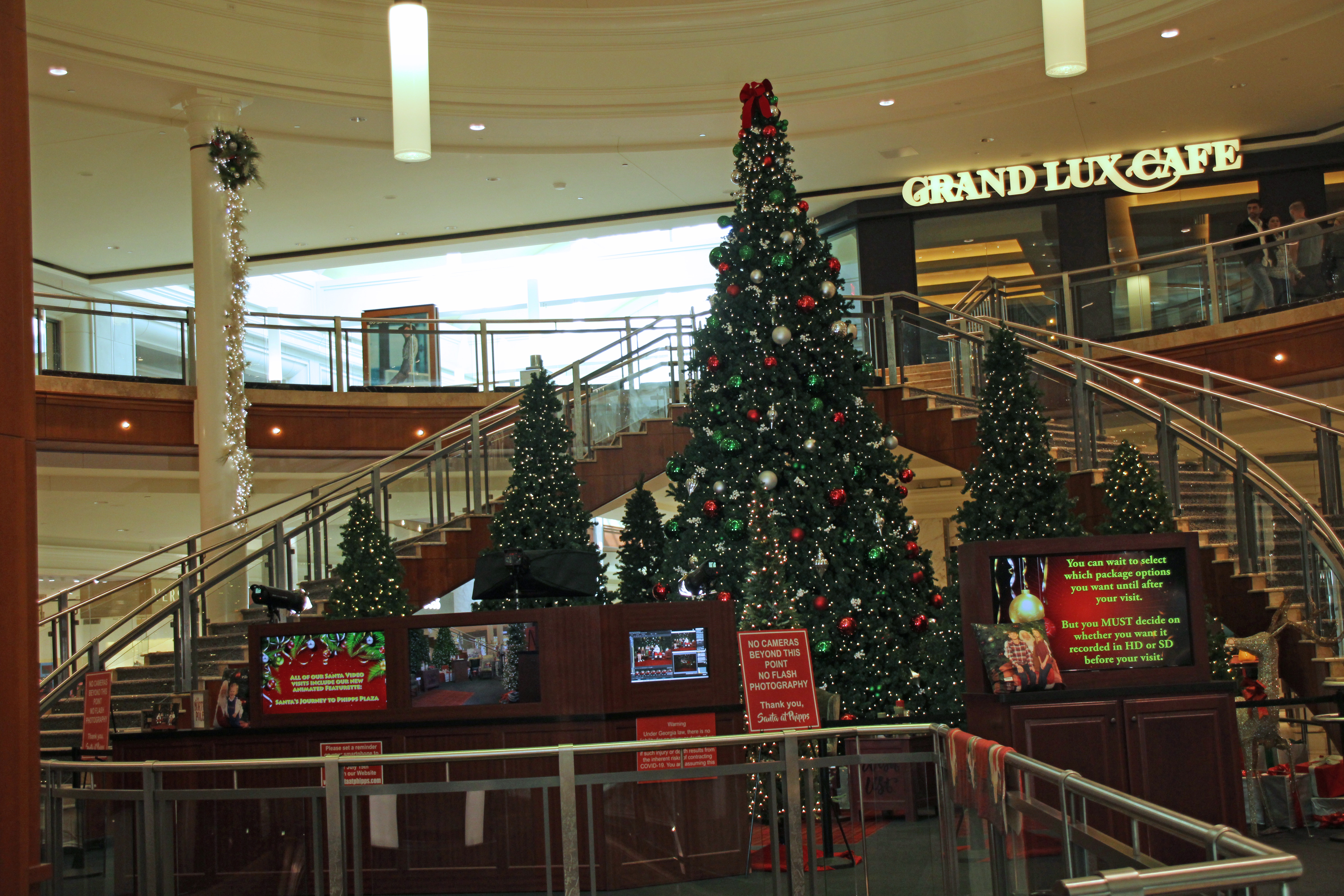
Phipps Plaza during the 2021 holiday shopping season

== See also ==
- List of shopping malls in the United States
- Lenox Square
- Buckhead Village District
