= Gosder Cherilus =

American football player (born 1984)

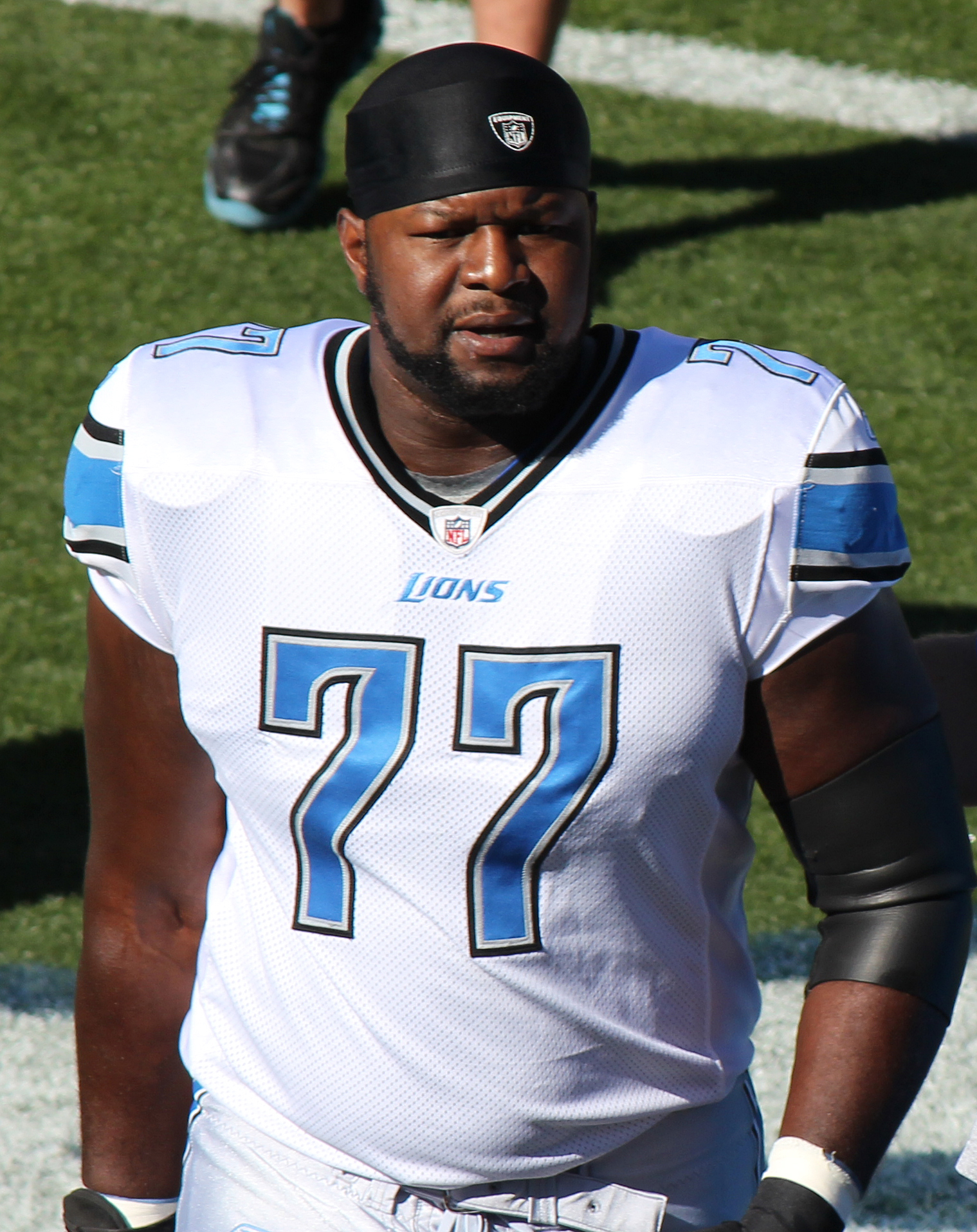
- Cherilus with the Detroit Lions in 2011

No. 77, 78
- Position: Offensive tackle

Personal information
- Born: June 28, 1984 (age 42); Haiti
- Listed height: 6 ft 7 in (2.01 m)
- Listed weight: 316 lb (143 kg)

Career information
- High school: Somerville (MA)
- College: Boston College (2003–2007)
- NFL draft: 2008: 1st round, 17th overall pick

Career history
- Detroit Lions (2008–2012); Indianapolis Colts (2013–2014); Tampa Bay Buccaneers (2015–2016)

Awards and highlights
- Second-team All-ACC (2007)

Career NFL statistics
- Games played: 132
- Games started: 116
- Fumble recoveries: 2
- Stats at Pro Football Reference

Gosder Cherilus (/ˈɡoʊstər ˈʃɛrɪləs/; born June 28, 1984) is an American former professional football player who was an offensive tackle in the National Football League (NFL). He played college football for the Boston College Eagles, and was selected by the Detroit Lions 17th overall in the 2008 NFL draft. Cherilus also played for the Indianapolis Colts and Tampa Bay Buccaneers.

== Early career ==
Cherilus played high school football at Somerville High School in Somerville, Massachusetts. Playing for Somerville head coaches Tony Gulla and Francis McCarthy, Cherilus earned All-State honors.

== College career ==
=== 2003 season ===
Cherilus redshirted for the Boston College Eagles.

=== 2004 season ===
Cherilus was the only redshirt freshman to start for the Eagles. He helped the Eagles to average 385.4 yards per game in total offense.

=== 2005 season ===
He started all 12 contests at right tackle during 2005 season. He worked well with right guard Josh Beekman, as the pair helped the Eagles record 387.75 total yards per game.

=== 2006 season ===
In 2006, Cherilus started in all 13 games at right tackle and paved the way for seven 100-yard rushing games and a collective 1,424 rushing yards by L. V. Whitworth and Andre Callender. He helped the team average 114.5 yards per game on the ground and 355.6 yards in total offense. He played at the 2006 Meineke Car Care Bowl win over Navy.

=== 2007 season ===
He was named all-Atlantic Coast Conference (ACC) second-team selection and recipient of the team’s Unsung Hero Award, Cherilus started 14 games at left tackle, helping BC rank seventh in the nation with an average of 323.9 yards per game passing, he registered 77 knockdowns with twelve touchdown-resulting blocks, finishing with a 78.0 percent grade for blocking consistency and also helped hold opponents to only 61 tackles-for-loss (fifth in the nation) and 22 sacks.

He served as team captain, along with Nick Larkin, Jo-Lonn Dunbar and Matt Ryan, who was also selected in the first round; third overall to Atlanta Falcons of the 2008 NFL draft. He was part of an offensive line that helped support Ryan in his record-setting season including a career-high five touchdown passes against Wake Forest and pave the way for the Eagles 5,924 yards in total offense. He started in the victory over Michigan State Spartans in the 2007 Champs Sports Bowl and in the 2007 ACC Championship Game loss to Virginia Tech. Cherilus started a school-record 51 straight games.

== Professional career ==
Pre-draft measurables
Height	Weight	Arm length	Hand span	40-yard dash	10-yard split	20-yard split	20-yard shuttle	Three-cone drill	Vertical jump	Broad jump	Bench press
6 ft 6 3/8 in (1.99 m)	314 lb (142 kg)	36 1/4 in (0.92 m)	11 3/4 in (0.30 m)	5.00 s	1.72 s	2.89 s	4.71 s	7.60 s	23.0 in (0.58 m)	8 ft 6 in (2.59 m)	24 reps
All values from NFL Combine/Pro Day

=== Detroit Lions ===
The Lions selected Cherilus in the first round with the 17th overall pick in the 2008 NFL Draft. As a rookie, Cherilus became a starter in the offensive line in his third game in the league replacing George Foster, and held that position for most of the 2008 season. As a rookie, he appeared in 16 games and started 13. In the 2009 season, he started all of the regular season games but Week 5. In the 2010 season, he started the first 12 games before suffering a season-ending knee injury. In the 2011 season, he started in all of the regular season games but Week 2. In addition, he started in the Lions' playoff game. In the 2012 season, he started in all 16 regular season games.

=== Indianapolis Colts ===
On March 12, 2013, Cherilus signed a five-year, $35 million with the Indianapolis Colts. Upon signing his contract with the Colts, Cherilus was the highest paid right tackle in the NFL at that time. He played the right tackle position opposite left tackle Anthony Castonzo. In 2013, he started all 16 games and started in the Colts' two postseason games. In 2014, Cherilus started 13 games, including his 100th career start in week 15. He missed the final two weeks of the regular season due to injury, and was placed on season-ending injured reserve on December 31, which is New Year's Eve.

On July 26, 2015, Cherilus was released by the Colts, two years into his five-year contract, having started 29 games.

=== Tampa Bay Buccaneers ===
On August 17, 2015, Cherilus signed a two-year contract with the Tampa Bay Buccaneers. During the 2015 season with the Buccaneers, Cherilus started in all 13 games he played for the team. In the 2016 season, he played in 15 games, starting in three.

On March 16, 2017, Cherilus announced his retirement from the NFL.

== Personal life ==
Cherilus established the Gosder Cherilus Foundation, a nonprofit organization with a goal to "improve the lives of underserved and underprivileged populations in the United States and Haiti."

On August 18, 2024, Cherilus was arrested "after he allegedly urinated on another passenger during a cross-Atlantic flight." His actions caused the Delta Air Lines flight he was on, which had departed Boston for Dublin, to return to Boston, where he was arrested by Massachusetts State Police. In a statement issued the following day, Cherilus noted, in part, that he "took a sleeping medication that I don’t normally use, which resulted in behavior that is not representative of my character".
