= Somerville High School (Massachusetts) =

Public secondary school in Massachusetts, US

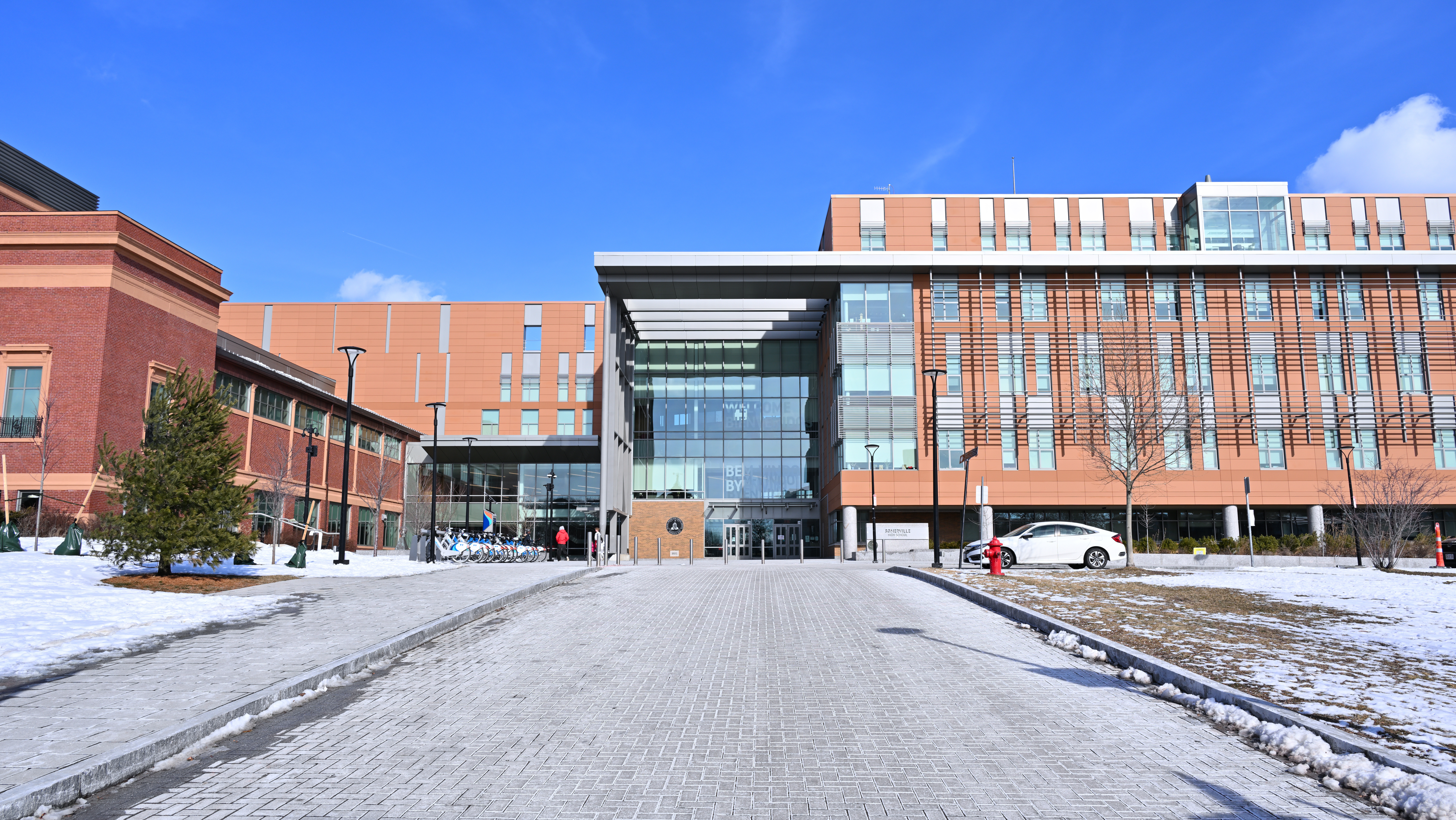

Location
- 81 Highland Avenue; Somerville, MA 02145; United States; 42.387°N 71.097°W

Information
- Type: Public Secondary
- Motto: Education Inspiration Excellence
- Established: 1852; 174 years ago
- School district: Somerville Public Schools
- Superintendent: Rubén Carmona
- Principal: Alicia Kersten
- Teaching staff: 124.50 (FTE)
- Grades: 9–12
- Gender: Coeducational
- Enrollment: 1,394 (2024–2025)
- Student to teacher ratio: 11.20
- Colors: Red and blue
- Song: Somerville Leads The Way
- Athletics: Baseball, Basketball, cheerleading, crew, cross country, football, golf, ice hockey, indoor track and field, outdoor track and field, lacrosse, soccer, softball, Swimming, Ultimate Frisbee, Tennis, Volleyball
- Athletics conference: Greater Boston League
- Nickname: Highlanders
- Accreditation: NEASC
- Newspaper: Highlander Highlights (1852–2010) The Piper (2011–2020), Highlander News (2020–)
- Yearbook: The Radiator
- MCAS % proficient and advanced: ELA: 88 Math: 78 Science: 73 (Spring 2015)

Somerville High School is a public, four-year high school in Somerville, Massachusetts, United States. The school offers a wide selection of classes and vocational programs.

Classes offered include English, social studies, mathematics, science, world languages, music, performing arts, visual arts, TV and media production, and computer applications. There are vocational programs in health careers, childhood development, electrical work, carpentry, auto repair, advanced manufacturing, graphic communications, drafting, cosmetology, culinary arts, and metal fabrication.

== Reconstruction ==
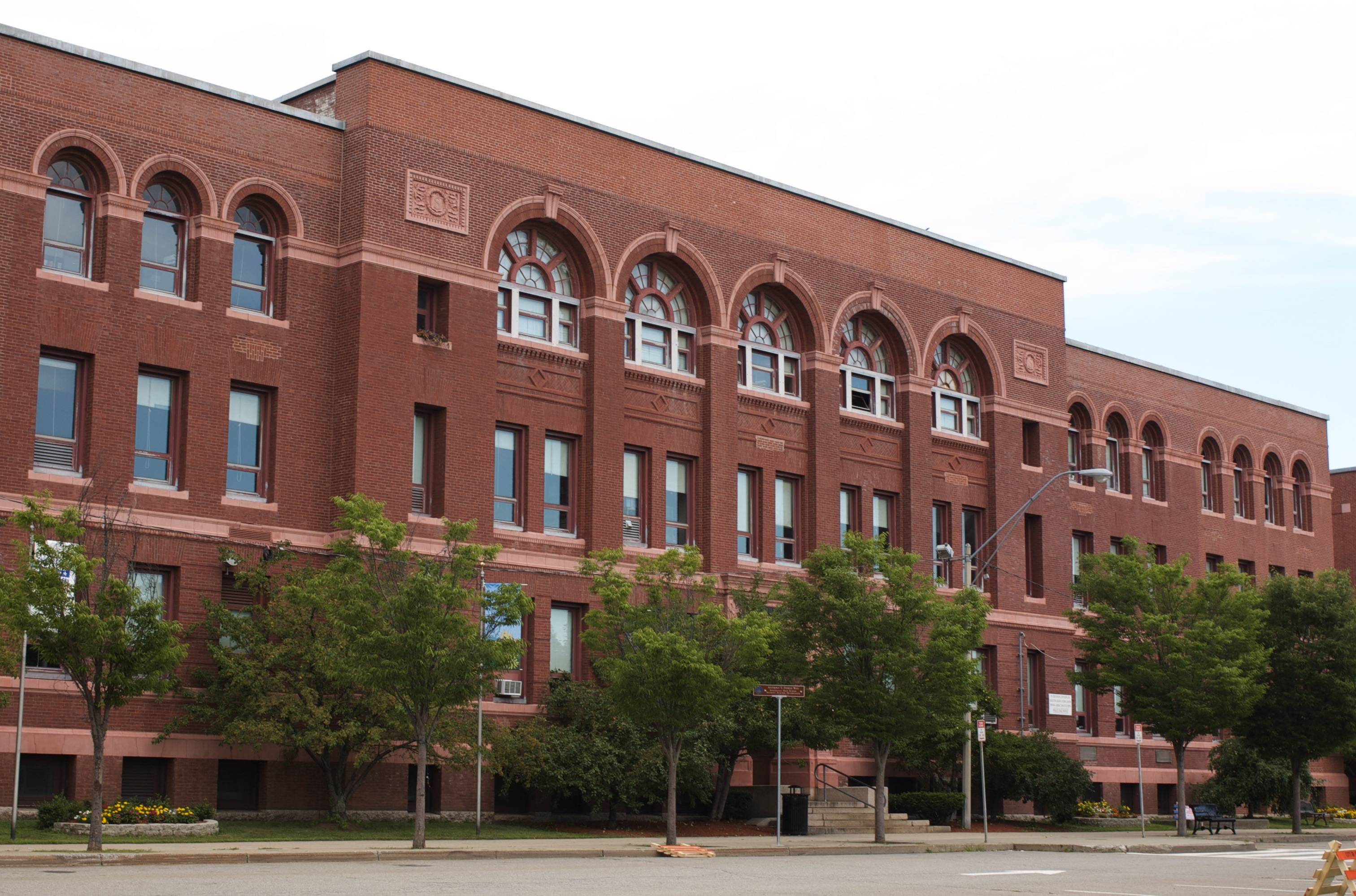
The former building in 2009

Somerville High School underwent extensive rebuilding in the late 2010s and early 2020s. Planning began in 2012, and voters passed a Proposition 2 1/2 override in 2016. Construction began in April 2018, displacing students. The original 1895 building was retained, as was the facade of the 1929 War Memorial. A new connected building opened to a small number of high-need students in various grades on March 4, 2021, during the COVID-19 pandemic in Massachusetts. Construction on the auditorium and cosmetology lab was still in progress, and new athletic fields were completed in spring 2022. A new broadcast studio is shared with the city government, and the 750-person auditorium and a 100-person lecture hall will be available for community events. The new complex is 396,000 square feet (36,800 m^{2}) with capacity for 1,590 students.

== Extracurricular ==
=== Clubs and societies ===
Somerville High School students participate in a wide range of self-run extracurricular clubs and societies. Competitive clubs include its Trivia Team, Science League, and a FIRST Robotics Competition team: FRC 6201 The Highlanders.

The Trivia team has sent students to compete at WGBH's High School Quiz Show. They have competed on the show seven times, most recently in 2025 on Season 16.

FRC 6201 The Highlanders have accomplished many achievements and have won many awards since their rookie year in 2016. Some of their most notable achievements include being the winning the Newsom Division at the 2026 New England FIRST District Championship, later being finalist for the Championship. This earned them a spot in qualifying at the FIRST Worlds Championship in Houston, Texas which they competed at.

In 2025, The Highlanders were also the 2nd seed alliance captain and finalist at the NE District Greater Boston Event with their robot named Plunk. They also won the 2023 NE District North Shore Event with their robot named Yoink, as well as back-to-back Team Spirit awards at both their competitions in 2023. In 2017, they also went to the FIRST World Championship in St. Louis, Missouri where they won the Creativity Award.

=== Student publications ===
Somerville High School publishes an online student newspaper, Highlander News.

=== Sports ===
Somerville High School has a sports program, highlighted by the recent success of its Cross Country team, that went 6–0 in the Greater Boston League in 2007, 2008, 2009 and 2010, capturing the GBL championship each season. The girls' indoor track team was successful, going undefeated and also capturing the GBL indoor track championship in the 2007–08 through 2010 seasons. Somerville High's outdoor track team also won the GBL Championships, with an undefeated winning streak for the 2008 through 2011 seasons.

The Football and Basketball Cheerleading team captured the National Championship title in Florida both in 2003 and in 2007, and has won the GBL title numerous times.

Gosder Cherilus earned Boston Globe and Boston Herald All-Scholastic honors as a senior at Somerville High School. He played tackle on both sides of the ball, and was named to Tom Lemming's All-America team in 2002. He also captured 2002 All-State accolades from the Mass. State Coaches Association. Cherilus also excelled on Somerville's basketball and track teams, and was selected with the 17th overall pick in the 2008 NFL draft by the Detroit Lions.

=== Theater ===
Highlander Theatre Company is Somerville High School's theater department. Highlander Theatre Company usually presents three productions per year: a musical, a full-length play, and a student-run fringe festival. Students participate as actors, crew, student directors, stage managers, and more. All sets, lights, and sound for productions are designed and operated by students.

In response to the COVID-19 pandemic, the 2020–2021 season was changed to feature a full-length play, multiple works written and/or directed by students, and a one-act musical. Performances took place virtually, using both video conferencing technology and pre-recorded techniques. A modified three-show season would run for the 2021–2022 school year, signalling Highlander Theatre Company's return to in-person theatre.

== Guinness World Record ==
On June 2, 2015, 59 Somerville High students attempted to break the world record for "most arm-linked people to stand up from the floor simultaneously." The previous world record is 49 people. After a total of 19 tries, the students managed to successfully stand up twice. Documentation footage was sent to the Guinness World Record Committee for further validation.

On June 19, 2015, the Guinness World Record Committee officially verified and confirmed that 59 Somerville High School students officially set the new world record for "most arm-linked people to stand up from the floor simultaneously." The school received its first certificate in August 2015.

== Notable alumni ==
- Mike Capuano, former mayor of Somerville and congressman of Massachusetts's 7th congressional district
- Gosder Cherilus, National Football League player
- Joseph Curtatone, former mayor of Somerville
- Henry Hansen, Iwo Jima, World War II
- Frank Harris Hitchcock, former United States Postmaster General
- Shanty Hogan, former Major League Baseball player
- James "Hutch" Hutchinson, studio musician and long time Bonnie Raitt bassist
- Eric Kebbon, FAIA, American Architect - 1890-1964 - 1908 Class President
- Marguerite LeHand, private secretary and chief of staff of Franklin D. Roosevelt
- Danny MacFayden, former Major League Baseball player
- Stephen Mahoney, former Boston College head football coach
- Connie Morella, former congresswoman of Maryland's 8th congressional district
- Charlie Osgood, former Major League Baseball player
- Annie Stevens Perkins (born 1868), writer
- Boris Pickett, singer songwriter
- Maurice Roberts, former National Hockey League player
- Pie Traynor, former Major League Baseball third baseman and Baseball Hall of Famer
- Phil Reavis, competitor in the high jump at the 1956 Olympics
- The Sturniolo Triplets, YouTubers and influencers
