= Thomson Mason (disambiguation) =

Thomson Mason (1733–1785) was an American barrister, planter and politician.

Thomson Mason may also refer to:

- Thomson Mason (1759–1820), American entrepreneur, planter, civil servant, and justice
- Thomson Francis Mason (1785–1838), American jurist, lawyer, councilman, judge, and the mayor of Alexandria, District of Columbia (now Virginia) between 1827 and 1830

== See also ==
- Thomas Mason (disambiguation)
