= Gosder Cherilus Foundation =

US Charity focusing on Haiti

The Gosder Cherilus Foundation is a registered 501(c)(3) American non-profit charitable organization. Prior to receiving 501(c)(3) status, the entity was first founded and incorporated as a charity in September 2009 by American football player Gosder Cherilus. According to its mission statement, the foundation's primary goal is to engage in efforts which work to "improve the lives of underserved and underprivileged populations in the United States and Haiti." Since its creation the foundation has engaged and continues to pursue several charitable projects, most notably a rescue and relief effort to Haiti (along with Haiti Outreach Mission) in response to the Haitian earthquake of 2010. The organization continues to fund efforts in Haiti and holds two annual youth football camps.

== Sources ==
- USA Today. "Several sports figures, groups pledge help to Haiti relief"
- NBC News, Michigan. "Lions player helps Wayne State docs aid Haitians"
- The Detroit Free Press. "Meeting with Bill Clinton, keep Lions' Gosder Cherilus inspired to help in Haiti"
- The Somerville News. "Somerville’s Lion, Cherilus gives back, holds camp"
- ESPN (May 28, 2010). Detroit right tackle Gosder Cherilus, a Haiti native, is putting together a group of relief workers to help survivors of the earthquake disaster"
- Boston College (February 2, 2010). "Gosder Cherilus Giving Back To Haiti"
