= Thomas Mayson =

Thomas Mayson may refer to:

- Tom Fletcher Mayson (1893–1958), English recipient of the Victoria Cross
- Tom Mayson (Canadian football) (1928–2010), Canadian football player
- Tommy Mayson (1886–1972), English footballer

== See also ==
- Thomas Mason (disambiguation)
- Mayson (surname)
