= Sturniolo Triplets =

American YouTube vloggers (born 2003)

- The Sturniolo triplets at the Surprise Party Tour in Houston, TX
- Born: Nicolas Antonio Sturniolo; Matthew Bernard Sturniolo; Christopher Owen Sturniolo; August 1, 2003 (age 23); Somerville, Massachusetts, U.S.
- Other names: Nick, Matt, and Chris
- Education: Somerville High School
- Occupations: YouTubers; influencers
- Years active: 2020–present

Instagram information
- Page: sturniolo.triplets
- Followers: 3.3 million

TikTok information
- Page: sturniolo.triplets
- Followers: 9 million

YouTube information
- Channel: Sturniolo Triplets
- Genres: Vlog; challenge; travel
- Subscribers: 7.73 million
- Views: 944.1 million
- Last updated: September 7, 2026
- Website: thesturniolotriplets.com

Nicolas Antonio Sturniolo, Matthew Bernard Sturniolo, and Christopher Owen Sturniolo (born August 1, 2003), known collectively as the Sturniolo Triplets, are American YouTubers and social media influencers. Hailing from Somerville, Massachusetts, the three began uploading videos of their conversations with each other in their car in 2020, through which they rose to online fame. They also became popular on TikTok, where, as of 2026, they have 9 million followers.

== Early lives ==
Nicolas, Matthew, and Christopher Sturniolo (in order of birth) are identical triplets who were born on August 1, 2003, in Somerville, Massachusetts, a suburb of Boston. The boys were delivered via Caesarean section; Nick was delivered first, followed by Matt two minutes later, and then Chris two minutes after Matt. Their surname is of Italian origin and they have one older half-brother named Justin. Their mother, MaryLou, is a former family liaison for Somerville Public Schools. They attended Benjamin G. Brown School for elementary school, where they were cast as the three-headed dog Cerberus in a school play. Chris and Matt both played various sports growing up, including hockey and lacrosse. The family's house burned down the summer before their junior year of high school, forcing them to move to an apartment. Nick is openly gay and came out to his brothers in 2019 during an argument about dating a girl, later publicly coming out in a post to his Instagram account in April 2020. He is also reported to play the clarinet. The triplets graduated from Somerville High School in 2021.

They posted their first YouTube video, a Q&A video of them eating food in a McDonald's parking lot in their mother's minivan while wearing costumes from the Dollar Tree, in October 2020 during their senior year of high school. From then, they chiefly posted videos of themselves casually conversing and arguing with one another in the car about random and humorous topics, which made them popular online, earning them over 25 thousand subscribers by July 2021. They had amassed over seven and a half million YouTube subscribers, over one million Instagram followers, and over three and a half million TikTok followers in 2022, the same year they made an oral contract with WME and moved to Los Angeles. The following year, their YouTube channel rose to having four million subscribers, while their TikTok account grew to having five million followers. In October 2022, Chris launched the clothing brand Fresh Love. In March 2023, they joined the podcast network Studio71 for their podcast Cut the Camera. By 2024, they had more than 8.8 million TikTok followers, six and a half million YouTube subscribers, and more than three million Instagram followers. In January 2024, Nick launched the lip balm brand Space Camp Wellness. In May 2026, Matt announced his debut book 'What Happened Yesterday', which released on August 18, 2026.

== Public image ==
PinkNews wrote that the Sturniolo Triplets' YouTube fame and fan base could be attributed to "their particular brand of chaos". Boston named them Boston's "best YouTube power trio" of 2023, with Amanda Lucidi of the magazine writing that their "bicker[ing] about literally nothing" had "a certain charm" that became "especially endearing when the trio breaks from play-bickering crosstalk to tend to one brother's itchy back emergency". Also for the magazine, Alyssa Giocobbe wrote that they were "cute", "charming", and "taking Zoomers' hearts by storm". For Elite Daily, Rachel Chapman wrote that their appeal came from "their content feel[ing] candid and relatable" and the triplets "each hav[ing] their own individual personalities and senses of humor". Fan edits of the triplets also became popular online in 2024.

The Sturniolo Triplets were included on The Hollywood Reporter's list of 2024's "most influential influencers", where their content was praised as "simple and simply hilarious". The triplets have embarked on three national tours: the Let's Trip Tour in early 2023, the Versus Tour in fall 2023, and the Surprise Party Tour in spring 2025. As of July 2025, they are now represented by United Talent Agency. They were previously managed by Z Star Digital, a talent management company founded by Laura Filipowicz, after being noticed online by her daughter, Madi Filipowicz.

== Tours ==
- Let's Trip Tour (2023)
- Versus Tour (2023)
- Surprise Party Tour (2025)

Surprise Party Tour Dates (2025)
| Date | City | Country | Venue |
|---|---|---|---|
| March 28 | San Antonio | United States | Tobin Center |
| March 30 | Houston | United States | Hobby Center |
| April 2 | Orlando | United States | Dr. Phillips |
| April 4 | Charlotte | United States | Belk |
| April 9 | Philadelphia | United States | Miller |
| April 11 | New York City | United States | Kings |
| April 12 | Boston | United States | Chevalier |
| April 14 | Toronto | Canada | Elgin |
| April 17 | Chicago | United States | Copernicus |
| April 18 | Nashville | United States | Fischer |
| April 19 | Branson | United States | Grand Shanghai Theater |
| April 21 | Denver | United States | Paramount |
| April 23 | Montana | United States | Mansfield PAC |
| April 27 | Las Vegas | United States | The Venetian Hotel |
| April 29 | Los Angeles | United States | Pasadena Convention Center |
