= Thomas Mason (apparel) =

British shirting brand owned by Albini Group of Albino, Bergamo

Thomas Mason is a British shirting brand founded in 1796 and currently owned by Albini Group of Albino, Bergamo.

Thomas Mason fabric mill was one of the first factories to manufacture cotton shirt fabrics. Thomas Mason uses the 100/2 weaving technique, otherwise known as Mayfair cotton, for a tight weave, ideal for high-end shirting. This made Thomas Mason popular with the aristocracy. Thomas Mason has collaborated with Unsubscribed, Brooks Brothers, J. Crew, and Todd Snyder. Thomas Mason was bought by the Albini Group in 1992.
