= Tommy Mason (English footballer) =

English footballer

Personal information
- Full name: Thomas Herbert Andrew Mason
- Date of birth: 20 February 1953 (age 73)
- Place of birth: Buxton, England
- Height: 5 ft 3 in (1.60 m)
- Position: Midfielder

Youth career
- 19??–1972: Derby County

Senior career*
Years	Team	Apps	(Gls)
1972–1974	Derby County	0	(0)
1974–1976	Brighton & Hove Albion	25	(2)
1976–1977	Horsham		
197?–198?	Carshalton Athletic		
- * Club domestic league appearances and goals

Thomas Herbert Andrew Mason (born 20 February 1953) is an English former professional footballer who played as a midfielder in the Football League for Brighton & Hove Albion.

== Life and career ==
Mason was born in 1953 in Buxton, Derbyshire. He began his football career with Derby County as a youngster, and turned professional in 1972. He never broke through to the league team, and signed for Brighton & Hove Albion in 1974. He made 28 appearances in his first season with the club, and was released at the end of his second. He moved into non-league football with Isthmian League clubs Horsham and – after a trial with Portsmouth came to nothing – Carshalton Athletic.
