= Todd Snyder (fashion designer) =

American fashion designer (born 1967)

Todd Snyder (born November 29, 1967) is an American fashion designer based in New York City. He founded his eponymous fashion label in 2011, and has been called "the most influential menswear designer of his generation" by GQ. The brand was acquired by American Eagle Outfitters in 2015, and reports over $100 million in annual sales revenue. Todd Snyder is also the Creative Director of American heritage brand Woolrich's Black Label Collection.

== Early life and education ==
Todd Snyder was born in Ames, Iowa, on November 29, 1967. He was raised in Huxley, Iowa. He graduated from Ballard High School, where he played football and basketball. His father was a civil engineer who "wore a suit and tie every day", and Snyder worked at their civil engineering firm as a draftsperson and surveyor. He initially studied finance at Iowa State University before changing his major to apparel merchandising and design.

== Career ==
In the 1990s, Snyder was a tailor's assistant at Badowers, a Des Moines menswear shop founded in 1950. Snyder moved to New York to design outerwear for Polo Ralph Lauren before becoming the director of menswear for the Gap Inc. Snyder later became SVP of menswear at J. Crew, where he designed The Ludlow Suit, The Broken-in-Chino and The Secret Wash Shirt and created collaborations with heritage brands, including Timex, Red Wing Shoes, Thomas Mason, and Alden.

Snyder founded his namesake label in 2011 in New York City, influenced by Savile Row tailoring, vintage military clothing and American workwear. The brand launched its first menswear collection in the Fall of 2011 at Bergdorf Goodman, Ron Herman, and Neiman Marcus. In 2012, the fashion label was picked up by Barneys New York and select Nordstrom stores. Not long after, GQ named him “The Man Who Taught Men To Love Clothes” and dubbed his New York flagship “The Menswear Temple We’ve Been Waiting For.” He has been a winner of GQ's Best Menswear Designers in America, recognized four times by the Council of Fashion Designers of America as a Menswear Designer of the Year nominee and is a 2013 CFDA/Vogue Fashion Fund finalist.

In November 2015, American Eagle purchased the Todd Snyder clothing brand and Snyder's Tailgate brand of vintage-inspired collegiate sportswear for $11 million.

In 2023, Todd was announced as the new Creative Director for Woolrich, for whom he is designing a new upscale Black Label Collection that will debut in the fall of 2024.

In January 2024, Todd Snyder returned to the runway with his FW24 Collection "The Modernist" in Firenze, Italy at Pitti Uomo, the world's largest menswear trade show. Showing on the international stage, Todd Snyder was described by the New York Times as “the righteous inheritor of Ralph Lauren's mantle” and “arguably the most important American designer in Europe this season” by GQ.

=== Retail locations ===
- Atlanta in Buckhead Village
- Boston in the Seaport District
- Chicago in Lincoln Park on Armitage Avenue
- Dallas at NorthPark Center
- East Hampton, New York
- Greenwich, Connecticut
- Los Angeles
  - The Grove
  - Abbot Kinney
- Manhasset, New York at Americana Manhasset
- Miami Beach at Bal Harbour Shops
- Nashville on South 12th
- New York City
  - Madison Ave at 26th Street, across from Madison Square Park
  - Rockefeller Center
  - Tribeca on West Broadway
  - Williamsburg
  - Upper East Side
- San Francisco Bay Area
  - Hayes Valley in San Francisco
  - Marin Country Mart in Marin County
- San Jose at Santana Row
- Washington, DC in Georgetown

== Collaborations ==
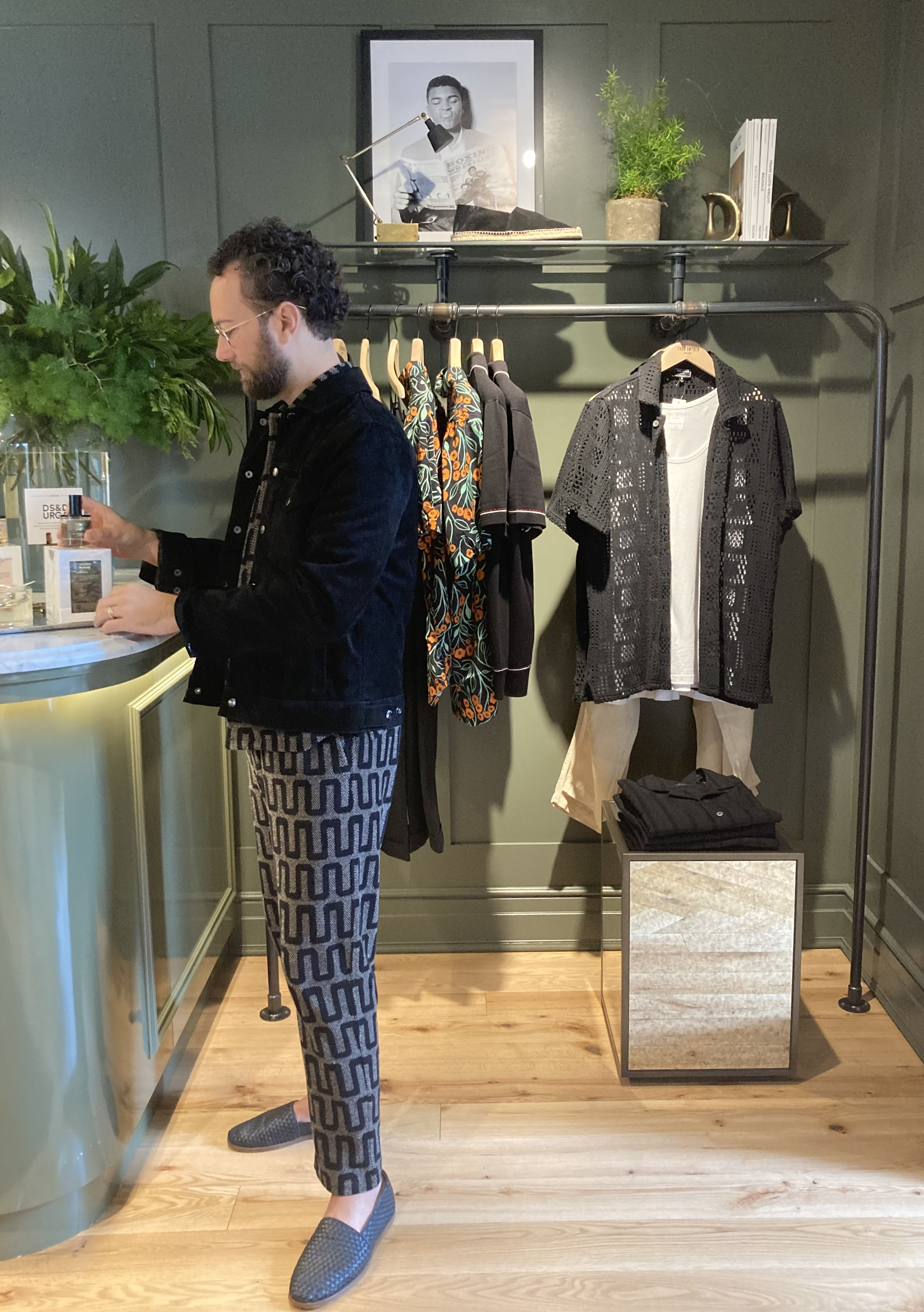
D.S. & Durga fragrances and candles are sold in all Todd Snyder boutiques

Snyder helped pioneer the modern collaboration at J.Crew back in 2007, when he partnered with Red Wing Shoes on an olive green version of their work boot. Four years later, when Todd started his eponymous label, he doubled down on that idea and since then has launch several collaborations with American labels each year.

Todd Snyder was the first designer to do a collaboration with L. L. Bean.

In 2013 Todd Snyder launched a partnership with heritage sportswear brand Champion, which was established in 1919.

In July 2019, Snyder created a Moby's x Todd Snyder capsule collection in collaboration with Hamptons restaurateur Lincoln Pilcher.

Todd Snyder commemorated the 10th anniversary of the brand by partnering with Vans on sneakers in the Vans Slip-On 98 DX and the Lace-Up 73 DX models redesigned with cork insoles and premium suede.

Todd Snyder and New Balance have a long-running collaboration, including a limited-edition version of the New Balance 237.

In 2023 Todd Snyder partnered with Michael Graham, founder of Brooklyn-based Savant Studios, on a capsule collection called Artifacts.

D.S. & Durga collaborated with Todd Snyder on a fragrance named Young Dunes, and its products are sold in Todd Snyder boutiques.

In November 2023 Woolrich appointed Todd Snyder as the Creative Director of its new Black Label premium collection.

The brand vends Red Wing Shoes, Moscot eyewear and Scosha bracelets.

== Awards and honors ==
- 2012 CFDA/Swarovksi Award for Emerging Talent in Menswear (nominee)
- 2012 GQ Best New Menswear Designers in America
- 2013 CFDA/Vogue Fashion Fund finalist
- 2014 CFDA/Swarovksi Award for Menswear (nominee)
- 2016 CFDA Menswear Designer of The Year (nominee)
- 2017 CFDA Menswear Designer of The Year (nominee)
- 2020 CFDA Menswear Designer of The Year (nominee)
- 2024 Fast Company’s Most Innovative Companies
- 2024 CFDA American Menswear Designer of the Year (nominee)

== Personal life ==
Snyder lives in New York City and has three daughters. He sits on the Board of Directors for Goodwill Industries and LIM College, where in 2022 he received the College's "Distinguished Achievement Award" as well as an honorary Doctor of Commercial Science degree in recognition of his outstanding contributions to the business of fashion.

== See also ==
- Tom Ford
- Perry Ellis
- Geoffrey Beene
- Bill Blass
- Ralph Lauren
- Joseph Abboud
- John Varvatos
- Billy Reid
