= Le Labo =

Perfume brand

- Type: Subsidiary
- Industry: Consumer goods
- Founded: 2006; 20 years ago (New York City, U.S.)
- Founders: Eddie Roschi; Fabrice Penot
- Headquarters: New York City
- Key people: Deborah Royer (Global brand president and creative director)
- Products: Cosmetics
- Parent: Estée Lauder Companies
- Website: Official website

Le Labo (French: the lab) is a slow perfumery brand born in Grasse, France, based in New York City and owned by Estée Lauder.

== History ==
Le Labo was founded in 2006 in New York City by Eddie Roschi and Fabrice Penot. It was purchased by Estée Lauder Companies in 2014.

== Products ==
Le Labo fragrances are named after the principal scent note and the total number of ingredients combined to make them.

In 2010, Le Labo was commissioned by Another Magazine to work on an exclusive scent, resulting in another 13.

Some of the most popular scents mentioned online are Santal 33, Thé Noir 29, and Thé Matcha 26.

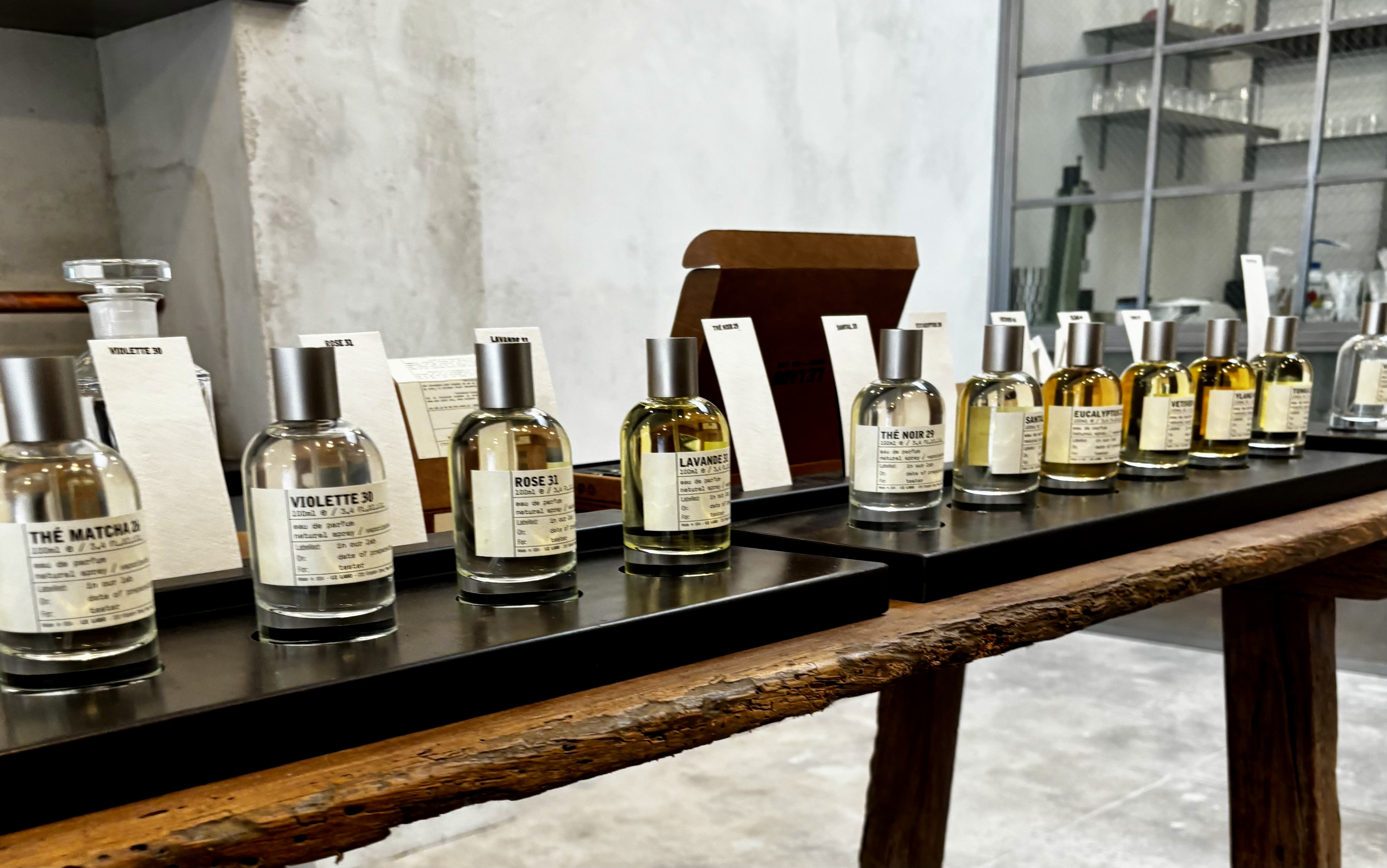
Le Labo, Los Angeles

Le Labo City Exclusives Collection pays tribute to cities all around the world and cost more than fragrances in the regular line. Each fragrance is dedicated to a different city, such as Tokyo (Gaiac 10), Shanghai (Myrrhe 55), Hong Kong (Bigarade 18), Dubai (Cuir 28), New York (Tubereuse 40), etc. These scents can only be purchased in their associated city, except for during Le Labo's annual City Exclusive Event where the products can be purchased online between August and September and in-store the whole month of September. As of 2025, the newest City Exclusive Collection release was Osmanthus 19 for Kyoto.

=== List of Le Labo Scents ===
Le Labo produces:

- ALDEHYDE 44 (Dallas)
- AMBRETTE 9
- ANOTHER 13
- BAIE 19
- BAIE ROSE 26 (Chicago)
- BENJOIN 19 (Moscow)
- BERGAMOTE 22
- BIGARADE 18 (Hong Kong)
- CEDRAT 37 (Berlin)
- CITRON 28 (Seoul)
- CORIANDRE 39 (Mexico City)
- CUIR 28 (Dubai)
- EUCALYPTUS 20
- FLEUR D'ORANGER 27
- GAIAC 10 (Tokyo)
- JASMIN 17
- LABDANUM 18
- LAVANDE 31
- LIMETTE 37 (San Francisco)
- LYS 41
- MOUSSE DE CHENE 30 (Amsterdam)
- MUSC 25 (Los Angeles)
- MYRRHE 55 (Shanghai)
- NEROLI 36
- OSMANTHUS 19 (Kyoto)
- PATCHOULI 24
- POIVRE 23 (London)
- ROSE 31
- SANTAL 33
- SHIU 25 (Beijing)
- TABAC 28 (Miami)
- THÉ MATCHA 26
- THÉ NOIR 29
- TONKA 25
- TUBEREUSE 40 (New York)
- VANILLE 44 (Paris)
- VETIVER 46
- YLANG 49

== Locations ==
The first boutique opened on 233 Elizabeth Street in New York's Nolita neighborhood. The brand has standalone boutiques and counters in department stores in the United States, Canada, Mexico, Brazil, UK, Germany, France, Belgium, Hong Kong, the Middle East, Japan, Malaysia, Singapore, Indonesia, Taiwan, China, South Korea, Thailand, and Australia.

== In popular culture ==
In Beyoncé's 2016 visual album Lemonade, the singer was depicted burning two Le Labo Santal 26 candles during the sequence for "Sandcastles".

In the movie Red, White & Royal Blue, the character Alex wears Le Labo Santal 33.

== See also ==
- Boy Smells
- Byredo
- Diptyque
- List of perfumes
