= Diptyque =

French fragrance company

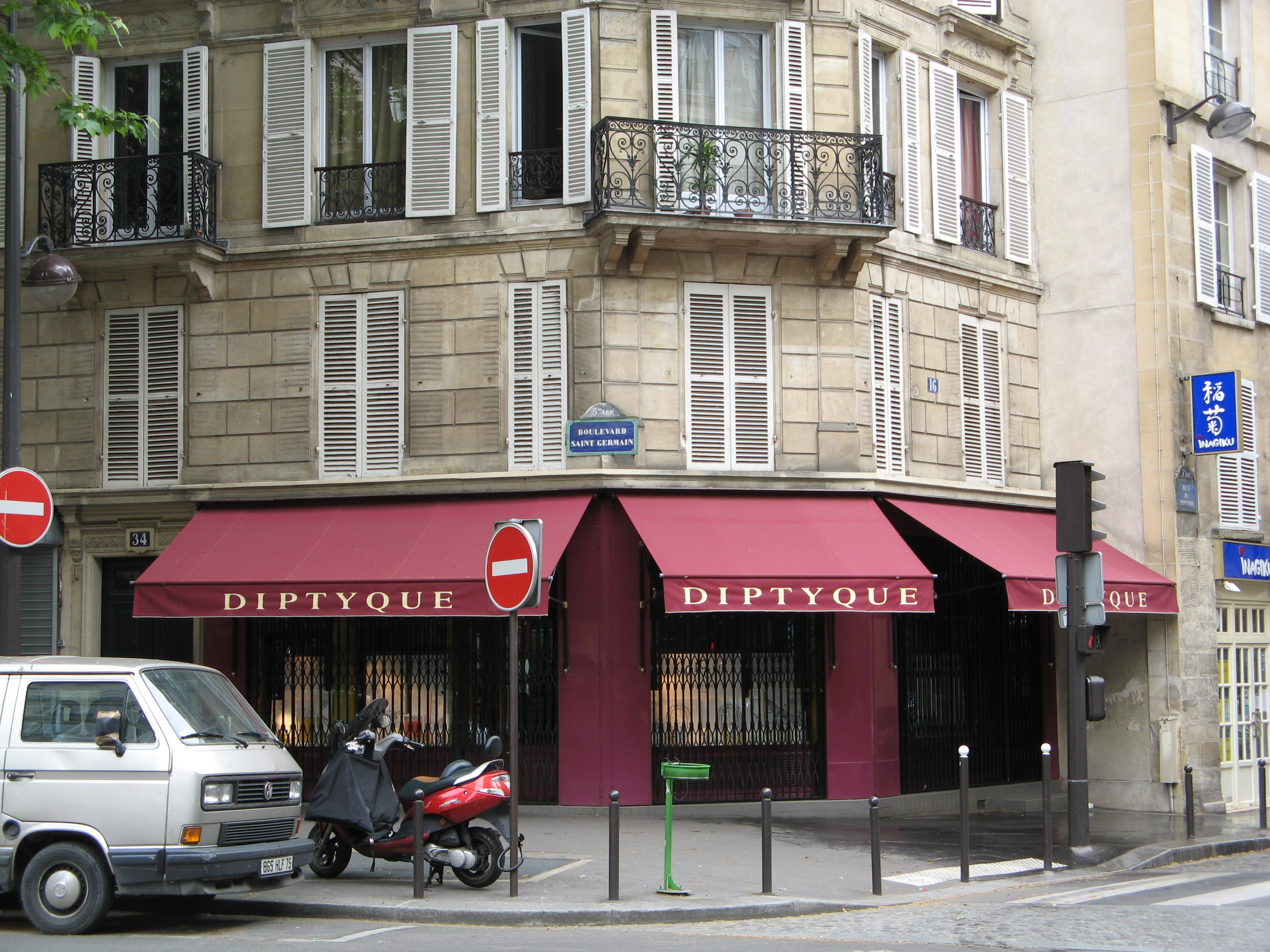
- Diptyque's flagship store in Paris, France, 2008
- Type: Private
- Industry: Luxury goods
- Headquarters: Paris, France
- Number of locations: 124 (global)
- Key people: Laurence Semichon (CEO)
- Revenue: €199 million (2024)
- Owner: Manzanita Capital
- Website: Official website

Diptyque Paris is a French luxury fragrance brand headquartered in Paris, France. Founded on 34 Boulevard Saint-Germain by a trio of designers: Yves Coueslant (French, a stage designer), Christiane Gautrot (French, an interior designer), and Desmond Knox-Leet (British, a painter). The brand name is derived from the Ancient Greek word Diptych, meaning a two-panel image, a reflection of the designer's early interest in cryptography. The company produces perfumes, colognes, scented candles, skincare, soaps, and oil diffusers. The original boutique still operates at the same location in Paris, and the brand has 124 boutiques worldwide.

== History ==
The company was founded by Yves Coueslant (a stage designer), Christiane Gautrot (an interior designer) and Desmond Knox-Leet (a painter). The first shop they opened sold fabric designs and various decorative items, but by 1963, they had introduced scented candles. By 1968, it came out with its first eau de toilette, called L’Eau. Do Son, a tribute to Yves Coueslant's memories of Vietnam, and Philosykos, a tribute to the fig groves of Greece, cemented Diptyque's reputation as a pioneer in niche perfumery. Over the years, more perfumes and scented candles were developed with perfumers including Olivia Giacobetti, Olivier Pescheux, and Fabrice Pellegrin. The signature black and white labels affixed to the candles were designed and hand-drawn by Knox-Leet. After Knox-Leet's sudden death in 1993, following an operation for appendicitis, Coueslant took over the design of the labels, and Mohamed Lataoui, another friend, became managing director.

In 2005, Diptyque was bought by London-based private equity firm Manzanita Capital.

As of 2025, Diptyque operates 124 boutiques worldwide, a significant increase from 70 in 2018. The brand has been expanding its presence in key markets, including the United States, Canada, and the United Kingdom. Notably, Diptyque opened its first Canadian store in Toronto in 2022, followed by locations in Vancouver and Montreal in 2024.

== Candles ==
Diptyque offers an array of candle sizes, small (2.50 oz), classic (6.70 oz), medium (10.60 oz), large (21.20 oz), and very large (51.30 oz). Although, it is worth noting that only bestsellers (baies, rose, figuier, tubérose, feu de bois, and ambre) are in the medium, large and very large sizes.

=== Classic Scents ===
- Baies
- Figuier
- Citronelle
- Rhubarbe
- Shiso
- Café
- Roses
- Ortie
- Feu de Bois
- Santal
- Vanille

=== City Exclusive Candles ===
- Paris
- New York
- London
- Tokyo
- Hong Kong
- Shanghai
- Berlin
- Miami
- Beverly Hills
- Pekin (Bejing)
- Seoul
- Milan

=== Limited Time Releases ===
- Pinéde (2026 Summer)
- Fleur de Cerisier (2026 Spring)

== Fragrances ==
=== Scents ===
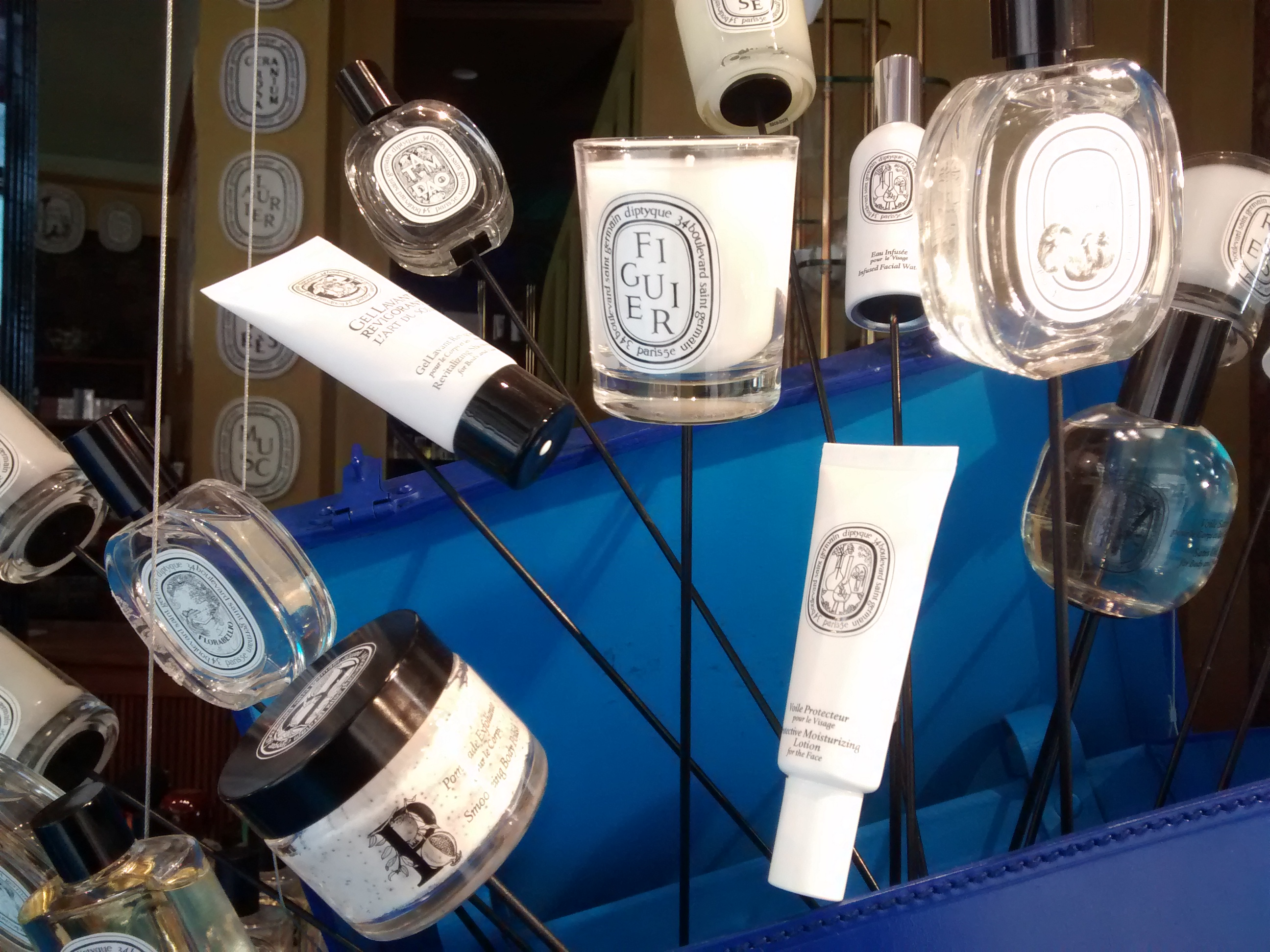
Products on display at Diptyque

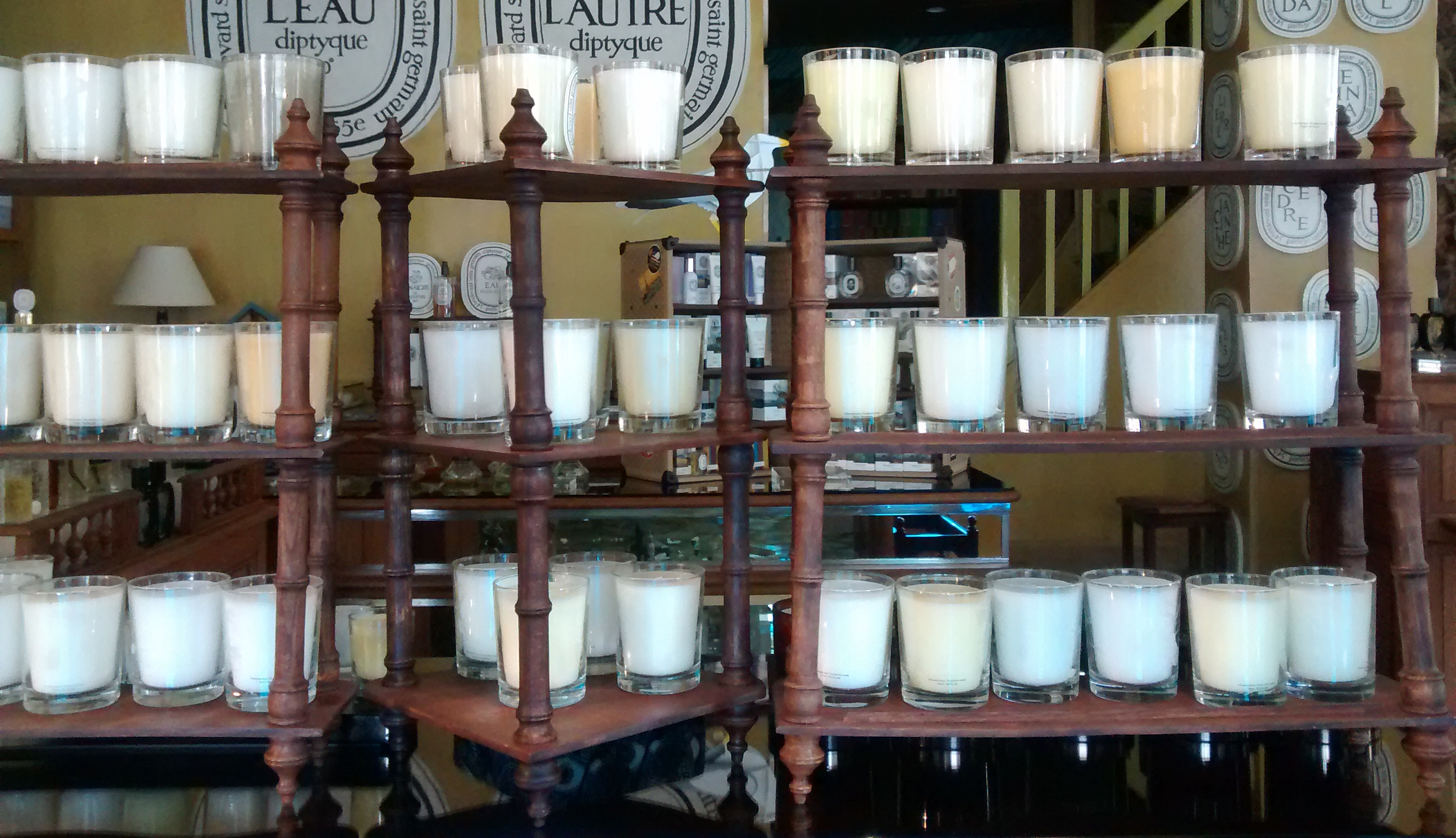
Candles on display at Diptyque

- L’Eau (by Norbert Bijaoui, 1968)
- Vinaigre de Toilette (1973)
- L'Eau Trois (1975)
- Virgilio (1990)
- Philosykos (by Olivia Giacobetti, 1996)
- Eau des Sens (by Olivier Pescheux)
- Tam Dao (2003)
- Do Son (2004)
- Eau de Tarocco (by Olivier Pescheux, 2008)
- L'Ombre dans l'Eau
- L'Autre
- Eau Rose
- Figuier
- Fleur de Peau (2018)
- Eau Duelle
- Eau Capitale
- Orphéon
- Tempo
- L'eau Papier
- Eau de Minthé
- Olène
- Eau Mohéli (by Olivier Pescheux)
- Eau Nabati
- Vetyverio
- 34 Boulevard Saint Germain (by Olivier Pescheux)
- Oyédo
- Benjoin Boheme (by Olivier Pescheux)
- Eau Rihla

== Home Scenting ==
Diptyque offers several other various forms of home scenting apart from their classic candle, such as, reed diffusers, room sprays, car diffusers, and an hourglass diffuser.

== See also ==
- Boy Smells
- Byredo
- Le Labo
- Francis Kurkdjian
- List of perfumes
