= Byredo =

Swedish fragrance company

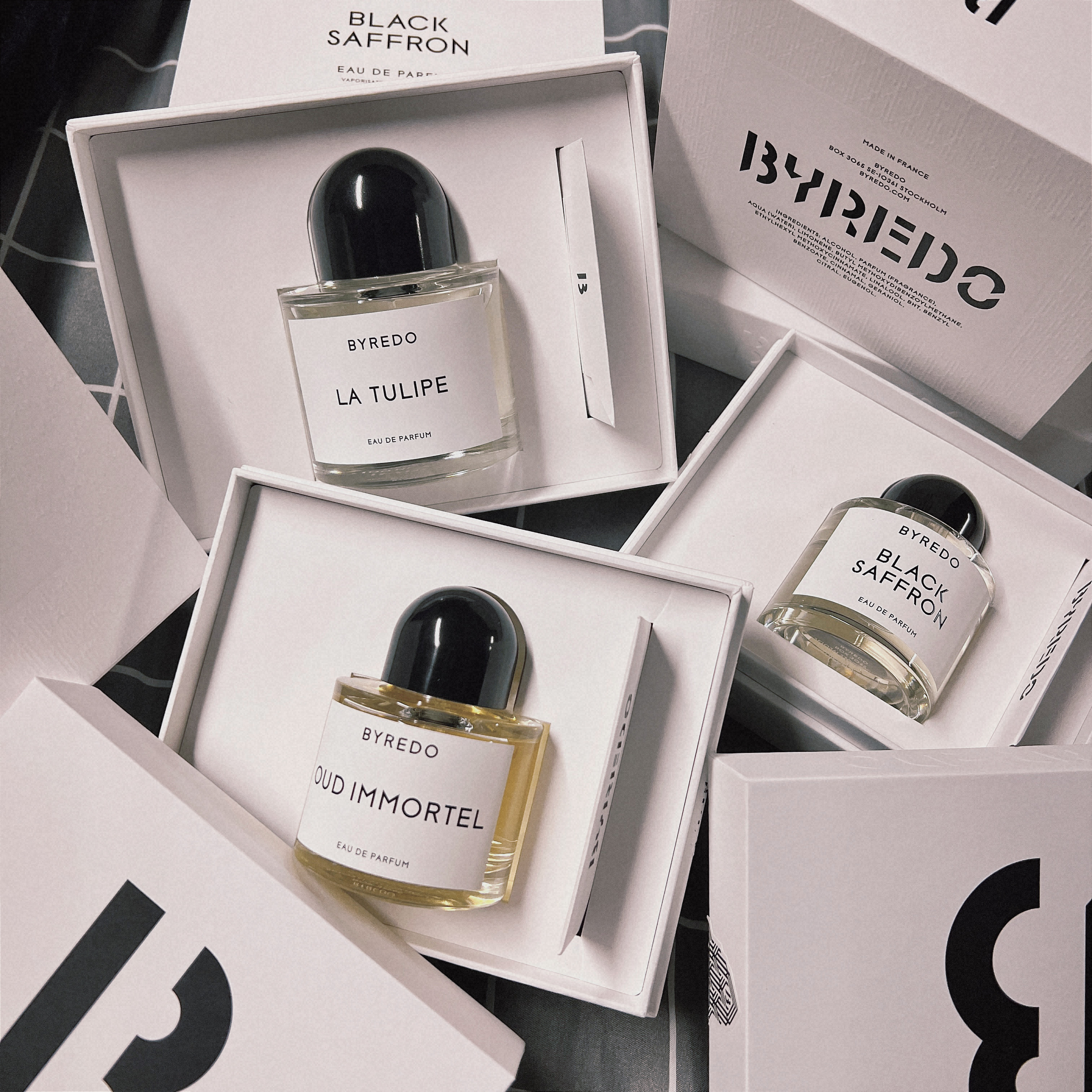
- Type: Subsidiary
- Founded: 2006; 20 years ago ; Stockholm, Sweden
- Founder: Ben Gorham
- Headquarters: Sweden
- Area served: Europe, North America, Asia
- Products: Luxury goods
- Parent: Puig
- Website: Official website

Byredo is a Swedish company that produces luxury fragrances, leather goods, and accessories.

== History ==
Byredo was founded in Stockholm in 2006 by Ben Gorham. The name Byredo is a portmanteau of "by redolence". The first fragrance released was Green (sage, orange and musk). In 2013, Gorham sold a majority stake of the company to London-based investment firm Manzanita Capital. This company was invested in Diptyque and Malin + Goetz, and also owns Space NK. In 2015, Byredo opened a second store in New York's Soho. Its first collection of handbags and other accessories debuted at the 2017 Paris Fashion Week.

In May 2022, Spanish conglomerate Puig acquired a majority stake in Byredo. The acquisition is intended to bolster Puig's high-end luxury portfolio. Byredo's founder, Ben Gorham, initially continued as a shareholder and chief creative officer.

In November 2023, Byredo launched fine jewelry as a new permanent category for the brand.

Ben Gorham left Byredo in June 2025 as part of a transition plan from the 2022 acquisition.

== Collaborations ==
Byredo released products in collaboration with perfumer Jérôme Epinette (2016), photographers Inez and Vinoodh (2016), designer Virgil Abloh (2018), furniture company IKEA (2020), makeup artist Isamaya Ffrench (2020) and US rapper Travis Scott (2021).
