= Aedes de Venustas =

Perfumery

- Named after: “Temple of Beauty”
- Established: 1995; 31 years ago
- Founders: Robert Gerstner and Karl Bradl
- Founded at: 15 Christopher Street, New York
- Purpose: Perfumery
- Headquarters: 16A Orchard Street
- Location: New York, United States
- Award: Fragrance Foundation Award
- Website: aedes.com

Aedes de Venustas is a niche perfume store (also called Aedes Perfumery) and fragrance line. Aedes has operated in Manhattan since 1995. The house perfume line launched in 2012, although there was an earlier collaboration with L'Artisan Parfumeur creating home fragrances (2005) and perfume (2008) also named Aedes de Venustas.

== History ==
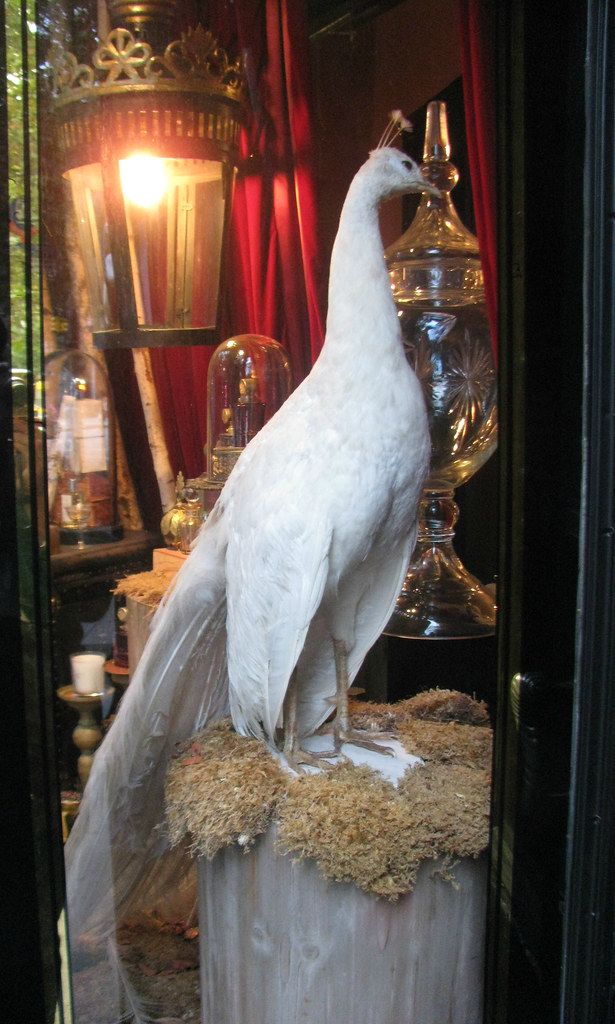
Aedes de Venustas window display at 9 Christopher Street in 2013

Founded by Robert Gerstner and Karl Bradl, Aedes de Venustas, which Gerstner translates as “Temple of Beauty”, first opened at 15 Christopher Street in the West Village in 1995. Gerstner and Bradl had worked for a German shipping company that closed and starting a business offered them a way to stay in New York. Both long-time perfume fans, they decided to offer hard-to-find lines, beginning with L'Artisan Parfumeur. After their first year in business, Bradl earned a small notice in Vogue after he made a cold-call visit to the Vogue offices with a selection of scents in a flower-adorned box, presentation that became an Aedes signature. This won a new customer with deep pockets: supermodel Naomi Campbell did her holiday shopping at the store. Bradl and Gerstner began sending similar floral arrangement packages to fashion industry leaders and the business took off. Other early customers noted in an InStyle magazine piece the following year included actresses Molly Ringwald and Debi Mazar and designer Todd Oldham.

The store later moved down the block to 9 Christopher Street, then in 2016 to a larger space at 7 Greenwich Avenue; in 2018 Aedes moved across town to 16A Orchard Street on the Lower East Side. The store’s decor has remained similar across its moves, described as “a velvet-lined fragrance box”, a “cabinet de curiosités” and a “jewel-box store” with “the feeling of a Victorian drawing room”.

== Products ==
=== Perfume ===
Over time, Aedes continued to bring in lines previously unavailable in the US, becoming the first to import A-esop from Australia, Czech & Speake and Bella Freud from the UK, and Etro from Italy.

=== Home and body products ===
In addition to perfume, Aedes is known for luxury candles from brands like Diptyque, Agraria, Mariage Frères, and Cire Trudon.

=== Aedes branded fragrances ===
For the store’s tenth anniversary in 2005, Aedes developed a signature home scent, a room spray called Aedes de Venustas Parfum d’Ambiance, through a collaboration with L'Artisan Parfumeur. The scent was so popular that it was adapted in 2008 to sell as a personal fragrance, Aedes de Venustas Eau de Parfum by L’Artisan Parfumeur. Bertrand Duchaufour was the perfumer to develop the scent, based on a visit to the store and Bradl and Gerstner’s taste, which they described as “we love dark fragrances, we love incense." In Perfumes: The A-Z Guide, Tania Sanchez gave the perfume four (of five) stars, calling it "an incense for a domestic ceremony, scaled to a private room” and recalled dry tea leaves' "unexpectedly complicated air of plum, rose, hay and cedar, before they awake in water."

Aedes later created an independent fragrance line that shares the names of the store. The line’s first fragrance, called Aedes de Venustas Eau de Parfum, or Aedes de Venustas Signature, launched in 2012. Duchaufour was the “nose” for this fragrance as well, creating a rhubarb and tomato leaf scent. In the 2018 edition of Perfumes: The Guide, Luca Turin gave the fragrance four stars and called it a “superlatively clever accord.” Reviewing the perfume for Vanity Fair, Anthony Rotunno wrote, “Everything, down to the crimson-tinted glass bottle’s packaging—a burgundy velvet box inspired by a swatch of fabric cut from the store—was deliberately chosen to promote the Aedes de Venustas vision, one of indulgent opulence that’s become synonymous with the store.”

The next addition to the line was Iris Nazarena by perfumer Ralf Schweiger, which won the 2014 “Perfume Extraordinaire of the Year” at the Fragrance Foundation Awards. Subsequent releases include Copal Azur, an incense fragrance, and Oeillet Bengale, a rose and carnation fragrance, in 2014; the rosewood perfume Palissandre d’Or in 2015, vanilla fragrance Cierge de Lune and vetiver fragrance Grenadille d’Afrique in 2016; Natalie Feisthauer’s geranium scent Pélargonium in 2017; and Musc Encensé in 2018.

In 2021, the line was relaunched with new packaging and a new fragrance named for the store’s new location, 16a Orchard. Harper's Bazaar said, “With a ginger center, this warm, vibrant scent is a little moody, a bit unexpected, and very much of its neighborhood.” The same year, Aedes released Encens Japonais, followed by Corfu Kumquat in 2022 and Amnesia Rose and Café Tabac in 2023. In 2024, Amnesia Rose won an Art and Olfaction Award in the Independent category, with Luca Maffei as perfumer and Karl Bradl as creative director.

Aedes co-owner Karl Bradl is also co-founder of the fragrance line Nomenclature. This line focuses on synthetic ingredients, molecules scientists have developed for use in perfumery.
