= Aedes (disambiguation) =

Aedes is a genus of mosquitoes. Aedes or Ædes or AeDES may also refer to:

- Aedes (Roman religion), in ancient Roman religion, a shrine or temple
- AeDES (engineering), Italian document re earthquake damage
- Ædes Danielis, building in Malta
- Aedes de Venustas, New York perfume store and perfume line
