= Denyse Beaulieu =

Canadian writer

- Education: Université de Montréal
- Occupations: Writer, translator
- Known for: Grain de Musc; The Perfume Lover
- Website: graindemusc.blogspot.com

Denyse Beaulieu is a Canadian writer, translator, and instructor. She is the author of bilingual perfume blog Grain de Musc as well as the memoir The Perfume Lover: A Personal History of Scent, a book about her collaboration with French perfumer Bertrand Duchaufour to create the L'Artisan Parfumeur fragrance Seville à l’Aube.

== Early life ==
Denyse Beaulieu grew up in a suburb of Montreal, Quebec. She earned a master's degree in French literature at the Université de Montréal, then moved to France to study semiology and literary history at Université Paris VII Jussieu.

== Career ==
Beaulieu's first paying job in France was as nude model. She also appeared, corsetted, in Bettina Rheims's book of erotic photography, Female Trouble (which also showed actress Catherine Deneuve, musician Annie Lennox and model Kristen McMenamy). Her writing career also includes erotica: she was the ghostwriter for an erotic novel and has published hard-core erotica for a literary magazine as well as a cultural history of sexuality. She was one of the translators and supervised the team of translators for the French edition of Fifty Shades of Grey series.

The Perfume Lover: A Personal History of Scent is a memoir recounting Beaulieu’s work with perfumer Bertrand Dechaufour. In trading travel stories with the perfumer, Beaulieu mentioned a love affair in her youth, having met a man during Holy Week in Seville, Spain. The story inspired Dechaufour and the book describes the development of the scent, Seville à l’Aube, going through 128 different versions ("modifications") until they arrived at Seville à l’Aube, which combines the orange blossoms of spring in Andalusia with the frankincense of Easter Week's Catholic processions.

Reviewing Beaulieu's work in the Los Angeles Times, Denise Hamilton said: “She writes with penetrating intellect about perfume, gender roles, cultural signifiers, the boudoir and her Bohemian life in a style that marries Jacques Derrida with Anais Nin.”
