= Olivia Giacobetti =

French perfumer (born 1966)

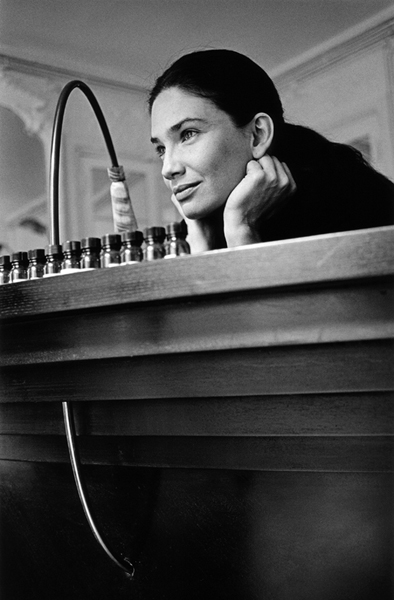
- Olivia Giacobetti
- Born: 1966 (age 59–60)
- Occupation: Perfumer
- Years active: c. 1982–present
- Notable work: Dzing! En Passant; Philosykos; Premier Figuier

Olivia Giacobetti (born 1966) is a French perfumer. She has an independent line called Iunx and has also created fragrances for Diptyque, L'Artisan Parfumeur, Guerlain, and Hermès, among other lines. She is particularly known for a refined style as well as innovation such as her novel use of fig in perfumery, popularizing the note beginning in the mid-1990s. She is among the perfumers who became prominent in a late-20th and early-21st-century turn toward the "nose" behind the scent and independent lines that foreground these creators, a shift away from perfumes sold by fashion labels or celebrities in other fields.

== Early life ==
Olivia Giacobetti was born in 1966. Her father Francis Giacobetti is an artist. Olivia Giacobetti was first drawn to perfumery at nine years old when she saw the Jean-Paul Rappeneau film Lovers Like Us, in which Yves Montand played a perfumer.

== Career ==
Giacobetti began working in perfumery for Annick Goutal when she was 16 years old. She joined French fragrance and flavor firm Robertet the following year and worked there for seven years as an assistant perfumer.

Giacobetti started her own company, Iskia, in 1990, then aged 24. Working out of a garden-laboratory in Paris's ninth arrondissement, she began taking commissions from lines like L'Artisan Parfumeur, Diptyque, and Hermès.

In March 2003, backed by Japanese cosmetics conglomerate Shiseido, Giacobetti started her own line of perfumes as well as candles and body products, called Iunx. Located in a large boutique at 48–50, rue de l’Université in Paris that Giacobetti developed with her father Francis, the original ambition was to create 60 scents, but the line struggled to find an audience and closed after two years. However, beginning in 2006 Iunx products were made available in a boutique in Hôtel Costes in Paris, where Giacobetti had also created the house signature scent in 1995, one of the first hotels to make such a commission. In 2016, Giacobetti opened a new Iunx boutique at 13, rue de Tournon in Paris.

In 2017, Giacobetti developed a line of five candles in collaboration with the Comédie-Française.

== Style and impact on perfumery ==
Giacobetti drew recognition early in her career for developing the use of fig as a note in perfume, particularly in 1994 fragrance Premier Figuier for L'Artisan Parfumeur and the 1996 Philosykos for Diptyque (the line's best-seller), both scents inspired by the fig tree; numerous other lines followed suit with fig fragrances of their own in the latter part of the decade. In Perfumes: The Guide, Luca Turin writes, "Premier Figuier was the fragrance that put Olivia Giacobetti on the map, and deservedly so: its fig-leaf note...was an overdue natural in perfumery, and pleasantly jarring."

Among Giacobetti's best-known creations is En Passant, a subtle but innovative floral fragrance that combines lilac with notes of wheat and cucumber to evoke spring rain on fresh flowers. In The Guide, Turin's co-author Tania Sanchez calls En Passant "a perfect example of Olivia Giacobetti's tendency...a fine white-on-white painting." Launched in 2000 by French niche perfume line Editions de Parfums Frédéric Malle, the fragrance was part of a turn toward the recognition of the perfumer behind the scent, with Malle including not only the name of the perfume and brand on his bottles' labels, but also the "nose" who created the fragrance. In turn, Giacobetti is among the perfumers who have raised the profile and sales of such independent and niche perfume lines, where (with a few exceptions) fashion labels and celebrity licensees previously dominated the perfume market. En Passant was featured in a 2017 exhibit on contemporary perfumery at Somerset House in London.

Giacobetti also received acclaim for her 1999 creation L'Artisan Parfumeur Dzing!, a scent inspired by Paris's Cirque d'Hiver. Discussing Dzing! in The New York Times, Chandler Burr called the perfume "one of the most innovative, authentically strange scents of the past two decades", managing to combine diverse aromas of sawdust, circus animals, caramel apples and more into "a comforting, subtly succulent mix." Burr writes: "Dzing! plays subtle purity against subtle power; it's fresh without green (a trick that takes serious perfumer talent to pull off), sweet without sugar (ditto), warm and soft like a plank of newly sawed pine still warm from the blade." Turin gave the perfume five stars in The Guide, saying "Olivia Giacobetti is at her imaginative, humorous best, and Dzing! is a masterpiece."

Giacobetti's scents are generally mixed-media, employing both natural and lab-developed synthetic ingredients. She describes these elements as "indissociable", with potent synthetic ingredients providing the fragrance's "spine" and natural ingredients adding "nuances". An exception to Giacobetti's mixed-media practice are her fragrances for Honoré des Prés, an all-naturals line.

== Personal life ==
Giacobetti lives in Paris. She has a daughter, born in 1996.

== Perfumes ==
=== Diptyque ===
- Philosykos (1996)
- Ofrésia (1999)
- Ôponé
- Curiosités (candle & scented pillar, 2011)
- Figuier (candle)
- Coing (candle)
- Feu de bois (candle)
- Bois Ciré (candle)
- Myrrhe (candle)
- Essence of John Galliano (candle)

=== Honoré des Prés ===
- Coconut Love
- Nu Green
- Chaman’s Party (2008)
- I Love Les Carottes (2010)
- Sexy Angelic (2008)
- Vamp à NY (2010)

=== Iunx ===
- L’Eau Aztèque
- L'Eau Baptiste
- L’Eau Ivre
- L’Eau qui pique
- L'Ether
- L'Eau Juste
- L'Eau Argentine
- L'Eau Aztèque
- L'Eau Frappée
- L'Eau Latine

=== L'Artisan Parfumeur ===
- L'Eau de L'Artisan (1993)
- Premier Figuier (1994)
- Drôle de Rose (1995)
- Fleur de Carotte
- Thé Pour Un Eté (1996)
- Navegar (1998)
- Dzing! (1999)
- Je me Souviens
- L'Eau du Fleuriste
- Passage d'Enfer (1999)
- Tea for Two (2000)
- Safran Troublant (2002)
- Sautes d'Humeur
- Figuier Extrême (2003)
- Jour de Fete (2004)
- Extrait de Songe / L'Eté en Douce (2005)
- Fou d'Absinthe (2006)

=== Miscellaneous ===
- Cellarius (candle, 2013)
- Cinq Mondes Eau de Brésil
- Idole de Lubin (2005)
- Hermès Hiris (1999)
- Guerlain Petit Guerlain (1994)
- Editions de Parfums Frédéric Malle En Passant (2000)
- Editions de Parfums Frédéric Malle Iris hand cream (2017)
- Andrée Putman Preparation Parfumée (2002)
- Hôtel Costes signature (Costes I, 1995)
- Byredo Flowerhead with Jérôme Epinette
- Theirry Mugler Les Secrets d'Angel (2000)
