= Nishane (perfume house) =

Turkish perfume house

- Type: Private
- Industry: Perfume
- Founders: Mert Güzel; Murat Katran
- Headquarters: Istanbul, Turkey
- Products: Perfumes

Nishane is a Turkish niche perfume house based in Istanbul, founded by Mert Güzel and Murat Katran. Its name comes from the Turkish nişane, meaning "symbol". The house has been the subject of coverage in the fragrance and fashion trade press as one of the better-known niche brands to emerge from Turkey.

== History ==
Accounts of the founding date differ: L'Officiel Monaco reported that the company was established in September 2012, with the two founders having worked together since 2010, while BeautyMatter gives a launch date of March 2015.

Güzel and Katran describe themselves as creative directors rather than perfumers, commissioning outside perfumers to compose fragrances from narratives they develop; Güzel has said each takes a minimum of eleven to twelve months.

== Fragrances ==
Nishane's output is organised into collections, among them the Shadow Play collection, whose fragrances Hacivat and Karagöz are named after characters from Ottoman shadow theatre, and collections drawing on Rumi and on Istanbul itself. Hacivat is built on bergamot, pineapple and grapefruit over jasmine, patchouli and oakmoss.

== Business ==
The company sells through department stores including Harrods, Galeries Lafayette and Harvey Nichols, with the United Arab Emirates, Italy and Germany among its larger markets. BeautyMatter, which included Nishane in its FUTURE50 list for 2026, reported projected revenue of between $150 million and $200 million for that year and backing from the investment firm Maxis Girişim.
