= Iskia =

Iskia may refer to:

- Iskia company
- Iskia Las Mercedes
- Iskia Altamira
- Iskia (company), a fragrance firm owned by perfumer Olivia Giacobetti
- Iskia, the Greek name for Isca sullo Ionio, a town in Italy
