= Goldfield & Banks =

Australian fragrance brand

- Industry: Fragrance
- Founded: 2016
- Founder: Dimitri Weber
- Headquarters: Sydney, Australia
- Website: www.goldfieldandbanks.com

Goldfield & Banks is an Australian fragrance brand. The company was founded in 2016 by Dimitri Weber.

== History ==
Goldfield & Banks was founded by Dimitri Weber, a Belgian-Frenchman who had previously worked at perfume houses in Europe. After previous visits to Australia, Weber moved to the country permanently in 2014 to work with a local cosmetics distributor, and founded Goldfield & Banks in 2016.

The brand first launched with a collection of perfumes based around the Australian landscape, and incorporates native plant extracts that represent Australian locations such as Fraser Island, Kakadu National Park, and Byron Bay. Goldfield & Banks also uses species introduced to Australia in its collection, such as agarwood grown in the Queensland tropics.

== Products ==
Goldfield & Banks fragrances are manufactured both in Switzerland at Firmenich, and in Melbourne at Australian Botanical Products. Its products are also sold in Europe, the United States, the Middle East, and East Asia.

One of the brand's fragrances, Southern Bloom, won the silver award for best new niche fragrance at the 2019 Pure Beauty Awards. Another Goldfield & Banks fragrance, Bohemian Lime, was a finalist in the 2021 Belgian Beauty Awards.
