= Niche perfume =

Type of perfume company

Niche perfume is an alternative to mass perfume production. Niche perfumery typically involves a more selective distribution and targets a narrower audience, rather than aiming for mass-market sales. These companies are generally smaller than the major fragrance firms like Coty Inc., Puig, and Firmenich, but bigger than "indie perfume" lines that are generally owned and operated by the perfumer themselves. Especially since the 2010s, however, the distinction has blurred as more and more niche perfume brands have been purchased by a larger parent corporation.

== History ==
In the last decades of the 20th century and first years of the 21st, niche perfumery gained a following especially in Europe and North America among people looking for unique scents, as niche houses generally made smaller batches than designer or celebrity fragrances and were thus less ubiquitous at a given moment. In Luca Turin and Tania Sanchez's Perfumes: The A-Z Guide (2010), Turin pinpoints L'Artisan Parfumeur, founded 1976, as "the first niche firm", and in the series’ second volume, names the opening of New York City perfume boutique Aedes de Venustas in 1995 as marking "the earliest days of the Cambrian Explosion of Niche."

In the 2010s, following a decade of decline for mass market fragrances, international luxury conglomerates purchased many niche lines and put them into wider distribution. Estée Lauder Cos. Inc. was an early entrant to this sector, buying the British niche brand Jo Malone London in 1999 (the founder, Jo Malone, stayed on as creative director until 2006, then left and eventually formed a new niche line called Jo Loves.) Estée Lauder's niche acquisitions accelerated in the 2010s, buying Éditions de Parfums Frédéric Malle and Le Labo in 2014 and By Kilian in 2016. Also in 2016, Spanish perfume conglomerate Puig purchased Penhaligon's and L'Artisan Parfumeur and L'Oréal acquired Atelier Cologne. In 2017, LVMH bought Maison Francis Kurkdjian.

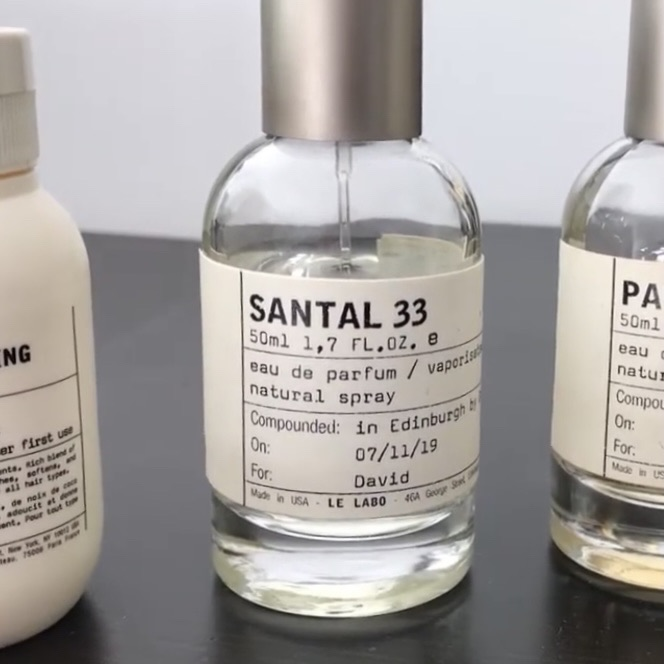
Le Labo Santal 33 in a 50 milliliter bottle

These changes complicated the concept of niche perfumery as many niche perfumes became as widely available and ubiquitous as designer perfume—where the latter had sometimes been termed "department store perfume", now many niche lines became frequently available in department stores as well. A September 2020 article in Marie Claire touting "Niche Perfumes That'll Set You Apart From the Crowd" mentioned Chanel No. 5 and Le Labo Santal 33–the latter a formerly exclusive niche scent—together as now broadly familiar fragrances to avoid in favor of more obscure niche lines.

== See also ==
- Olivia Giacobetti
- Bertrand Duchaufour
- Jean-Claude Ellena
