= Bertrand Duchaufour =

French perfumer

Bertrand Duchaufour (French pronunciation: [bɛʁ.tʁɑ̃ dy.ʃo.fuːʁ]) is a French perfumer. He has had a prolific career, beginning in Grasse at Lautier Florasynth and continuing for a number of fragragrance firms as well as working independently and as the house perfumer for L'Artisan Parfumeur. He has drawn praise for niche perfume creations as well as mainstream hits.

== Career ==
Beginning his career in 1985, Bertrand Duchaufour trained at the Lautier Florasynth group in Grasse, then spent 10 years at Créations Aromatiques, then Symrise, working in their fine fragrance department. His first signed fragrance came in 1995, creating Amber & Lavender for Jo Malone. In 2008, he became an independent perfumer, taking on work directly, including at L'Artisan Parfumeur as house perfumer. In 2014, he joined fragrance firm TechnicoFlor, where he has been consulting for three years.

== Fragrances and style ==
Duchaufour is a prolific creator, making fragrances for a variety of perfume houses, including Penhaligon's and Acqua di Parma, as well as fashion houses Comme des Garcons, Givenchy and Dior. Many of his fragrances have received substantial critical praise. In 2008, The New York Times perfume critic Chandler Burr wrote of Duchaufour's creation for Eau d'Italie Paestum Rose: "Duchaufour is an expert in shadows (see his Dzongka, done for l'Artisan Parfumeur). He paints olfactory charcoals and grays and deep purples with the smells of smoke and worn wood, a living Old Master of scent, and Paestum Rose is not just perfectly calibrated on a technical level. It is better than that. It is a work of art. The perfume unfolds with a scented crepuscular darkness, a twilight that is an exact balance of disappearing sunlight and incipient evening." The fragrance smelled modern, Burr said, without resorting to "easy clichés" to accomplish this. Rather the scent reminded Burr of a Caravaggio one of the Eau d'Italie owners admired. "Paestum Rose is a perfume that's rich and filled with meaning like the intimate opalescent blacks Caravaggio painted, instantly known and strangely unfamiliar. In this perfume we smell ancient beauty made thrillingly new."

Though Duchaufour's œuvre is widely varied, he is especially known for incense fragrances, like Timbuktu (2004) and Dzongkha (2006) for L'Artisan Parfumeur and Jubilation XXV for Amouage (2007). His 2008 L'Artisan creation for perfume boutique Aedes de Venustas was another entrant into this category, earning four stars in Luca Turin and Tania Sanchez's Perfumes: The A-Z Guide; writing of all four, Sanchez said Duchaufour's work with incense makes "austerity seem rich, as it does in Rembrandt's portraits of burghers, whose penitent black and white costumes are clearly cut of luxurious cloth." In the same Guide, Turin gave Timbuktu five stars, calling it “the first true masterpiece of what, by analogy with nouvelle cuisine, I would call nouvelle parfumerie” and Duchaufour one of its “chief exponents”, with Jean-Claude Ellena. The ingredient cypriol gave Timbuktu “a smoky note without a trace of oiliness or tar, the smell of crisply burned dry wood on a bonfire”, but, Turin notes, “no single raw material ever ‘made’ a fragrance, and [Duchaufour] should take full credit for a masterly composition.”

In 2017, Duchaufour's 2002 fragrance Incense: Avignon for Comme des Garçons was included in an exhibit at Somerset House on developments in perfumery in the prior 20 years, in particular "perfumes that have changed the way we think." Co-curator Claire Catterall named it as one of the 10 most important niche perfumes in the period, noting that scent, which uses frankincense, sandalwood and Iso E Super to evoke a Catholic mass, is Morrissey's favorite perfume.

== Controversy ==
In 2012 Duchaufour worked for Gulnara Karimova, daughter of Uzbek dictator Islam Karimov. Duchaufour created her fragrances Victorious for men and Mysterieuse for women. Asked why he would involve himself with the repressive regime, Duchaufour responded in writing to fragrance blog CaFleureBon: "I have been a little bit naive and just considered the good part of the project (money) and didn't realize what was behind."

== Honors ==
In 2017, Duchaufour was awarded perfumer of the year by the Russian FiFi Awards.

== Perfumes ==
=== Acqua di Parma ===
- Cipresso di Toscana (2005)
- Colonia Assoluta (2003), with Jean-Claude Ellena

=== Alex Simone ===
- Encore un peu (2016)
- Après vous (2016)
- L'incitation (2016)
- Encore un peu absolu golden signature (2021)
- Après vous absolu golden signature (2021)
- L'incitation absolu golden signature (2021)

=== Comme des Garçons ===
- Series 1, Leaves: Calamus (2000)
- Series 1, Leaves: Mint (2000)
- Series 2, Red: Harissa (2001)
- Series 2, Red: Sequoia (2001)
- Series 3, Incense: Avignon (2002)
- Series 3, Incense: Kyoto (2002)
- Series 5, Sherbet: Cinnamon (2003)
- Series 5, Sherbet: Peppermint (2003)
- Series 5, Sherbet: Rhubarb (2003)
- Comme des Garçons 2 Woman

=== Eau d'Italie ===
- Baume du Doge (2008)
- Paestum Rose (2008)

=== Extrait d'Atelier ===
- Maître Jardinier (2019)

=== Frapin ===
- 1697 (2011)

=== Givenchy ===
- Amarige d'Amour (2002), with Emilie Copperman
- Lucky Charms (2005)

=== Grandiflora ===
- Queen of the Night (2017) for Grandiflora
- Boronia (2018) for Grandiflora

=== L'Artisan Parfumeur ===
- Mechant Loup (1997)
- Patchouli Patch (2002, with Evelyne Boulanger)
- Piment Brulant (2002)
- Poivre Piquant (2002)
- Timbuktu (2004)
- Ambroisie Ararat (2005)
- Aedes de Venustas (2005 home fragrance, succeeded by a 2008 Eau de Parfum)
- Dzongkha (2006)
- Fleur de Liane (2008)
- Al Oudh (2009)
- Havana Vanille (2009)
- Nuit de Tubereuse (2010)
- Traversée du Bosphore (2010)
- Seville à l'aube (2012)
- Deliria (2013) (Triptyque I Explosion d'émotions)
- Skin on skin (2013) (Triptyque I Explosion d'émotions)
- Amour nocturne (2013) (Triptyque I Explosion d'émotions)
- Haute Voltige (2014) (Triptyque II Explosion d'émotions)
- Onde Sensuelle (2014) (Triptyque II Explosion d'émotions)
- Rappelle-toi (2014) (Triptyque II Explosion d'émotions)
- Noir Exquis (2015)
- Vanille Absolument

=== LAMBRE ===
- Son Secret (2012)
- Son Desir (2012)

=== Majda Bekkali ===
- Fusion Sacrée Clair (2012)
- Fusion Sacrée Obscur (2012)

=== Miller Harris ===
- Tender (2018)
- Blousy (2019)

=== Naomi Goodsir ===
- Or du Serail (2014)

=== Neela Vermeire Créations ===
- Trayee (2012)
- Mohur (2012), Mohur Extrait (2014)
- Bombay Bling (2012)
- Ashoka (2013)
- Pichola (2015)
- Rahele (2016)
- Niral (2018)

=== Penhaligon's ===
- Amaranthine (2009)
- Orange Blossom (2010)
- Sartorial (2010)
- Eau Sans Pareil (2011)
- Esprit du Roi (2011)
- Vaara (2013)
- Lothair (2014)
- Tralala (2014)
- Ostara (2015)

=== Phuong Dang ===
- Artist (2017) with Mark Buxton

=== Pont des Arts ===
- A ce Soir (2018)
- A chaque instant (2018)

=== Sigillo Verona ===
- Romeo (2024)
- Juliet (2024)

=== Spiritum paris ===
- Solar Soul - N°1 (2022)
- Builder Of Future N°4 (2022)
- Spiritual Explorer N°7 (2022)
- Final Spirit N°9 (2022)

=== St Giles Fine Fragrance ===
- The Writer (2017)
- The Stylist (2017)
- The Mechanic (2017)
- The Actress (2017)
- The Tycoon (2017)

=== THEATRE des PARFUMS ===
- J`ATTIRE (2014)
- MONPLAISIR 1723 (2015)
- POÉSIE du CHAOS (2019)
- Lе VENT STELLAIRE (2019)
- Lа SOIF d`ÉTERNITÉ (2019)

=== Miscellaneous ===
- Amber & Lavender (1995), for Jo Malone
- Fahrenheit Fresh, for Parfums Christian Dior
- Bazar Femme (2002), with Emilie Copperman & Jean-Claude Ellena, for Christian Lacroix
- Flora Bella (2005), for Lalique
- Jubilation XXV (2007), for Amouage
- Cauliflower (2009)
- Enchanted Forest (2012) for The Vagabond Prince
- I Miss Violet (2015) for The Different Company
- Hidden (2018) for Forage
