= Lyn Harris =

British perfumer

Lyn Harris is a British independent perfumer trained in Paris and Grasse, known for her eponymous fragrance line – Perfumer H, as well as founding British fragrance house Miller Harris. The New York Times has described Harris as the first classically trained female British perfumer.

== Early life and education ==
Harris was born in Halifax, Yorkshire, and spent her childhood between Yorkshire and Scotland. Her early olfactory memories were influential – she has stated that her grandparent’s countryside home in Scotland is something she frequently recalls and is imbued in her work – They grew berries, fruits and flowers in their walled garden and the house was filled with the aromas of home baking, jam making and burning log fires. Harris has said these memories became foundational in her journey as a perfumer.

Later in her native Yorkshire, school holidays were spent working at a local perfumery. It was in these years, and during trips to France that Harris’s curiosity about scent grew, leading her to want to study to become a perfumer.

She moved to Paris in 1992 to study under Monique Schleinger, a perfumer trained by Jean-Carles. She later moved to Grasse to work with a second-generation master perfumer at Robertet, beginning an enduring relationship between Harris and Robertet.

== Miller Harris ==
In 2000, Harris created Miller Harris with her business partner Chistophe Michel, opening their first store in Notting Hill. According to The Times, Harris quickly built a reputation as a leading perfumer in the fashion & beauty industry during her time at the company.

Among the fragrances created during her time at Miller Harris was L’air De Rien – a scent composed with Jane Birkin, who famously disliked most perfumes as she felt that they weren’t ‘her’. Birkin describes this process as ‘like trying to do a portrait of me in scent’.

In 2013, she left Miller Harris to continue to focus on independent projects and bespoke fragrance commissions.

== Perfumer H ==
Perfumer H was established in 2015, with the vision of communicating her specific style as a Perfumer whilst championing the artistry and beauty of fragrance – from the formulas, to the bottles in which they’re contained, to the spaces from which they’re sold. The brand’s motto is ‘Making air visible’.

Perfumer H has collaborated with various artists and designers since the launch of the brand. The hand-blown glass bottles - which have been present since the brand’s inception - are all made by Michael Ruh, a glass artist based in south London.

Perfumer H stores feature work from Will Calver, a London-based painter who applies 18th-century masters’ techniques, often rendering still life imagery of some of Harris’s raw materials. Other collaborators include woodworker Bobby Mills and ceramicists Ed Hill and Hiro Nakata. Photographer & filmmaker Joao de Sousa works alongside Harris on each creative campaign for Perfumer H. High Snobiety have described the brand as ‘a work of tight collaboration — a way for Harris to work with people she likes and respects’.

Harris has described her approach to perfumery as creating "olfactive paintings".

In 2025, Perfumer H opened its Shanghai flagship store, a multi-level concept space incorporating an artist-in-residence programme and a gallery. The inaugural exhibition, Process, featured work by Harris's collaborators alongside local artisans.

In 2026, Perfumer H received investment from Elixir 1 investment – the firm led by former Aesop chief executive Michael O’Keefe, and Ilyos Capital, which is led by former Aesop general manager, Thomas Buisson.

== Fragrances ==
Harris has created for brands including Cire Trudon, Ulla Johnson, Sunspel, Claus Porto, Vyrao, Sam McKnight, Antoinette Poisson, and Connolly.

Ink is one of Perfumer H's best-known fragrances. In 2024, Harris collaborated with food writer Nigel Slater on Ink Re-written, a limited-edition reinterpretation of the original fragrance. Slater, who had worn Ink for years prior, worked with Harris on the reimagined version.

In 2026, she released Soap Eau de Parfum, a collaboration between Perfumer H and British clothing brand Studio Nicholson. Described by 10 Magazine as ‘weightless, invisible and essential’. Soap was released to widely positive reception, and stands apart in the Perfumer H range as an aldehydic, clean, skin-scent.

Harris has also collaborated with various brands on interior scents – having worked on projects for venues including Estelle Manor, 40 Duke at Selfridges, The Carlyle and St Clement.

== Style and reception ==
Harris's work has been described as combining artistic practice with perfumery. Highsnobiety referred to her as "both an artist and a translator", noting her emphasis on collaboration and craftsmanship.

Nature is a recurring source of inspiration in Harris's work. The New York Times described her fragrances as featuring "deliciously native and naturalistic notes", while Vogue referred to her as "the best and most stylish nose in the British fragrance business".

In conversation with Sotheby’s – for whom Harris created three unique scented candles inspired by paintings – she described her process as akin to the still lives from which she drew inspiration: ‘Capturing aspects of nature with such beauty, but also such reality’.

Harris has also said that her approach to perfumery has long been informed by the idea that fragrance should not "wear you", commenting that the growing popularity of skin scents reflects a philosophy that has shaped her work throughout her career.

== Accolades and recognition ==
In 2005, she was a finalist in the prestigious Francois Coty awards.

In 2017, Harris participated in the exhibition Perfume: A Sensory Journey Through Contemporary Scent at Somerset House, which featured the work of ten perfumers.

In 2025 Harris was the subject of The Perfumer, an exhibition at BY ART MATTERS Tianmuli Art Museum, which presented fragrances alongside raw materials, objects and items from her personal collections spanning the course of her career.
