= Jo Malone =

British perfume entrepreneur (born 1963)

Jo Malone CBE
- Born: Joanne Lesley Malone; 5 November 1963 (age 62)
- Occupations: Perfumer, entrepreneur
- Known for: Founder of companies Jo Malone London and Jo Loves
- Spouse: Gary Willcox
- Children: 1

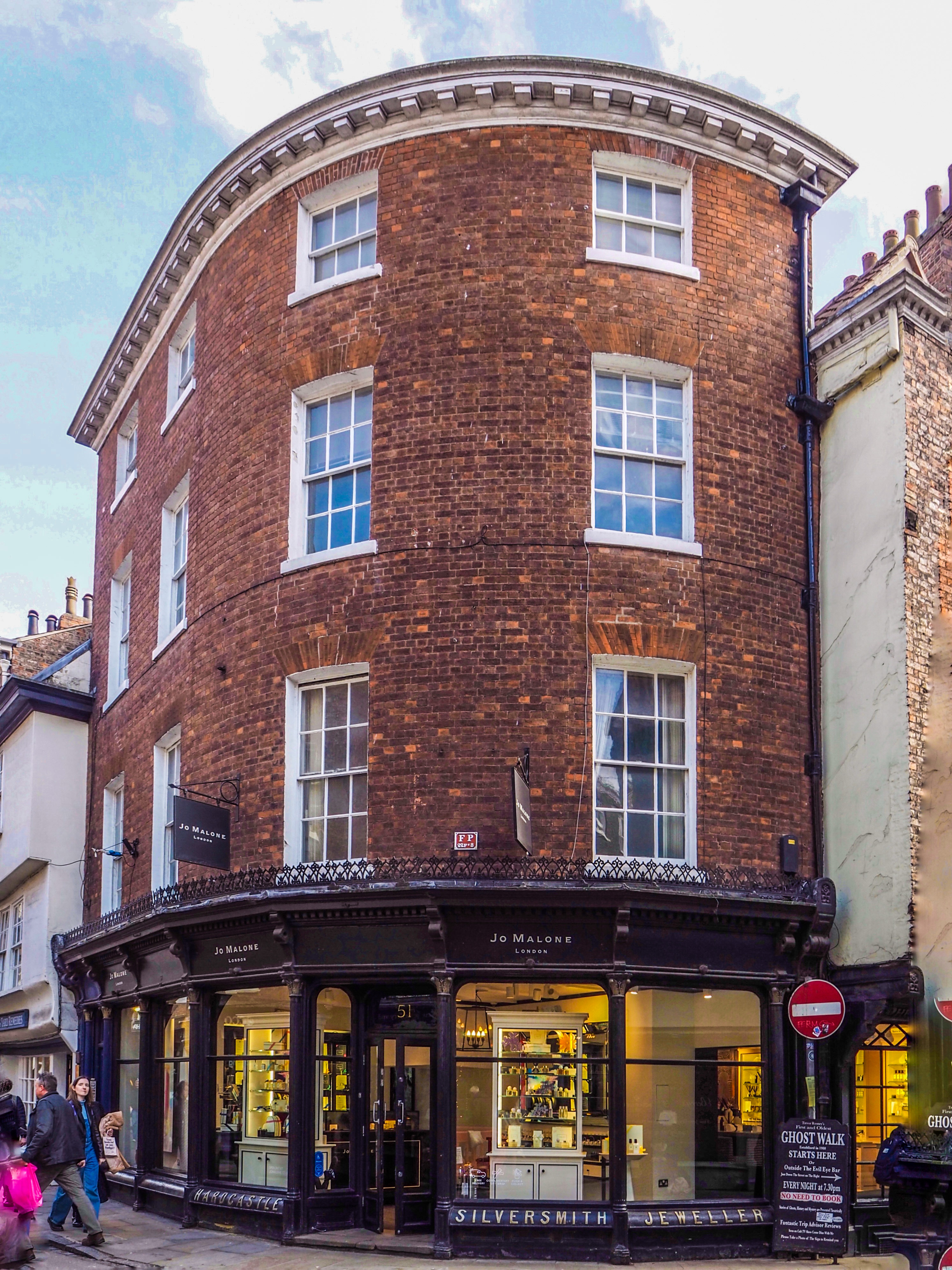
Jo Malone shop in York, England

Joanne Lesley Malone (born 5 November 1963) is a British perfumer and founder of the companies Jo Malone London, Jo Loves and Jo Vodka. She sold Jo Malone London in 1999 to Estee Lauder Companies. In 2011 Malone founded Jo Loves.

== Early life ==
Malone was born on 5 November 1963, and grew up in a council house in Bexleyheath, South East London. She had severe dyslexia, and left school aged 13 to care for her mother, who had a stroke.

== Business ==
In 1999, Malone sold Jo Malone London to Estée Lauder Companies for "undisclosed millions". In 2011, she started a new fragrance company, Jo Loves.

In 2008, Malone received an MBE, then in 2018 a CBE. In 2015, she was a castaway on BBC Radio 4's Desert Island Discs.

In 2025, Malone established Jo Vodka, a trilogy of fusion vodkas named "101 The Purist", "102 The Bohemian" and "103 The Artist".

In 2026, Estée Lauder Companies sued Malone over the use of her name in a fragrance collaboration between Jo Loves and Zara. Estée Lauder argued that the collaboration breached contractual restrictions dating from Malone's 1999 sale of Jo Malone London.

== Personal life ==
Malone is married to former surveyor Gary Willcox, and they have a son together.

In 2003, Malone was diagnosed with an aggressive form of breast cancer, and after a year of treatment her cancer was in remission.
