= Miller Harris =

British luxury perfume brand

- Type: Private
- Industry: Fragrance
- Founded: 2000; 26 years ago in London, United Kingdom
- Founder: Lyn Harris
- Headquarters: London, United Kingdom
- Website: millerharris.com

Miller Harris is a London-based perfume brand founded by perfumer Lyn Harris in 2000. In 2012 Harris sold a stake in the company, with The Daily Telegraph later noting that Miller Harris had become "a major player in the world of independent fragrance".

Miller Harris has two London stores, in Seven Dials and Covent Garden.

As of 2019, Miller Harris have opened eight shops in other countries, in Hong Kong and China.

In 2010, the business received a boost in awareness to its clientele when Michelle Obama was gifted a set of candles by the then UK Prime Minister David Cameron and his wife Samantha Cameron, on their first trip to meet President Barack Obama in Washington DC.

From 2010 through to 2020, Miller Harris continued to launch fragrances with Robertet, the French fragrance house, adding bestselling lines such as Lumière Dorée and Étui Noir. In 2018, the brand launched the now bestselling fragrance Scherzo. Based on a page torn out of the novel Tender is the Night, by F. Scott Fitzgerald, and given to perfumer Mathieu Nardin. The resulting fragrance was, in 2020, claimed by Grazia to be one of the 10 cult perfumes, taking the planet by storm.

In 2020, Miller Harris gave all the hand wash and soap in its warehouse to Age UK in response to the COVID-19 pandemic.

In 2021, Miller Harris became part of the Spanish beauty and fashion group Puig.
