= Mane SA =

Manufacturer of fragrances

- Industry: Flavours and Fragrance
- Founded: 1871
- Founder: Victor Mane
- Headquarters: Le Bar-sur-Loup
- Number of locations: 28 Manufacturing sites, 50 R&D centers, 39 countries
- Key people: Jean Mane, Michel Mane, Samantha Mane
- Products: Flavours and Fragrances
- Revenue: €1,5 billion (2021) €1,7 billion (2022)
- Number of employees: +8,000
- Website: www.mane.com

Mane SA is a French family-owned multinational company that manufactures flavours and fragrances and related ingredients for the food, beverage, and consumer goods industries. Founded in 1871, Mane has grown into one of the significant providers of sensory solutions globally, with a presence in multiple countries and annual revenues in the billions of euros. The company is a member of the European Flavour Association.

== History ==
Mane was established in 1871 by Victor Mane, beginning with the extraction of aromatic materials from regional flowers and plants in the Provence region of France. Over the 20th century, the company expanded internationally and diversified its operations to include both flavours and fragrances. Leadership of the company has remained within the Mane family across multiple generations.

By the early 21st century, Mane had become a global player in its sector, operating manufacturing and research centres in Europe, North America, Asia and Africa. Annual sales continued to increase, with reported revenue of approximately €1.7 billion in 2022 and €1.77 billion in 2023.

Throughout its history, Mane has also engaged in sustainability and corporate responsibility efforts, including signing the United Nations Global Compact in 2003.

== Acquisitions ==
In January 2026, it was announced that Mane had acquired Belgian biotechnology company Chemosensoryx Biosciences for an undisclosed sum. The acquisition is intended to support Mane’s receptor-based research into olfactory, gustatory, and trigeminal perception, enhancing its scientific capabilities in flavour and fragrance development.

== Affiliations ==
Mane is listed as a flavour house member by the European Flavour Association, a trade association representing flavour suppliers and national flavour organisations across Europe.
