= European Flavour Association =

European trade association for flavour industry

- Abbreviation: EFFA
- Formation: 1961; 65 years ago
- Type: Nonprofit
- Legal status: Trade association
- Purpose: Advocate for the European flavouring industry
- Location: Brussels, Belgium
- Region served: Europe
- Official language: English
- Affiliations: International Organization of the Flavor Industry (IOFI)
- Funding: Member fees
- Website: effa.eu
- Formerly called: Bureau de Liaison des Syndicats Européens des Produits Aromatiques

European Flavour Association (EFFA) is a non-profit European-level trade association of the flavor industry, based in Brussels, Belgium. Founded in 1961, the organisation originally focused on both flavours and fragrances, but has focused solely on flavours since 2006. Its members include 12 national (covering approximately 300 SME's) and 10 direct member companies.

== History ==
The association was founded in 1961. It was originally called the "Bureau de Liaison des Syndicats Européens des Produits Aromatiques". Thirty years later, this name was officially changed to the European Flavour and Fragrance Association (EFFA). EFFA is based in Brussels, Belgium.

In 2009, changes in how the flavour and fragrance industries were regulated led to EFFA to divide into two organisations. After that date, EFFA focused solely on the flavour industry, while the International Fragrance Organisation - Europe (IFRA) assumed responsibility for the fragrance industry in Europe.

On 20 June 2017, EFFA hosted the "FlavourDay" in Brussels to bring together food and flavouring industry experts. Additional FlavourDays were held later that year in Copenhagen, London and Paris, and continues in 2018, starting with Istanbul.

== Purpose ==
EFFA helps to promote and coordinate Europe's flavour industry, which accounts for approximately one-third of the global market and includes more than 300 businesses employing 10,000 skilled workers. In addition, EFFA helps to coordinate regulatory positions within the industry and information about flavourings for the general public.

EFFA welcomed the European Commission (EC) Regulation on Flavourings and has published a Guidance Document on the EC Regulation on Flavourings that is available at its public website: http://effa.eu/library/guidance-documents

== Members ==
EFFA's members include the national flavour associations of Austria, Belgium, Denmark, France, Germany, Italy, the Netherlands, Spain, Sweden, Switzerland, Turkey, and the UK.

Company members include Firmenich, Givaudan with its famous molecule Petalia, Mane, Robertet, International Flavors and Fragrances, Symrise, Takasago, Kerry Group, and Sensient Flavors. In January 2018, McCormick & Company joined as an EFFA full member.

EFFA is itself a member of the International Organization of the Flavor Industry (IOFI).
