= Jo Loves =

British perfume brand

Jo Loves is a British niche perfume brand founded by perfumer Jo Malone in 2011, following her 2006 departure from Jo Malone London. She had founded that brand in 1994, and subsequently sold it to Estée Lauder Companies in 1999.

== Background ==
Based in London, England, Jo Loves sells fragrances, scented candles, and bath and body products.

The name Jo Loves refers to the memories and experiences which inspired Malone to create each fragrance. When the brand launched in 2011, Malone said, "This new brand is about memories – it's where I am and the person I am now". The CEO is Gary Willcox, Malone's husband.

== Products ==
The company produces 14 different fragrances, and bath cologne, body crème, body lotion, bath & shower gel, and scented candles. The scent 'Pomelo' was the first fragrance that Malone created after a five-year pause from creating fragrances. Malone has explained that all of her products capture the things in life that inspire her, and many of the fragrances are influenced by Malone's interest in cooking.

With Jo Loves, Malone has developed innovative products, including layered scented candles, launched in 2012. Composed of three scent layers, the candle burns through the first scent and then blends with the middle layer, producing a compound fragrance before burning down to the bottom layer for a final fragrance. Bath cologne was introduced in 2013; an industry first, it contains 10% fragrance, placing it between an eau de toilette and an eau de parfum. The formulation took Malone two years to develop. The same year Malone introduced the Jo Loves tapas, an in store service where customers are served fragrances as if they were culinary dishes, such as a tagine of Bath Cologne.

== Stores ==
The first Jo Loves store was opened on 42 Elizabeth Street in London's Belgravia neighbourhood. The same site was the location of Malone's first job as a florist's assistant when she was sixteen years old. Malone created the fragrance "No. 42 The Flower Shop" to commemorate this. In November 2011, Jo Loves operated two pop-up stores; one in department store Selfridges in London and another in Mayfair, London. Jo Loves also has an on-line store.
