= Takasago International Corporation =

Japanese flavours and fragrances company

- Native name: 高砂香料工業株式会社
- Company type: Public (K.K)
- Traded as: TYO: 4914
- ISIN: JP3454400007
- Industry: Chemicals
- Founded: December 9, 1920; 106 years ago
- Headquarters: Kamata, Ota-ku, Tokyo 144-8721, Japan
- Area served: Worldwide
- Key people: Satoshi Masumura (President and CEO)
- Products: Flavors; Fragrances; Aroma ingredients; Fine chemicals
- Revenue: ▲JPY 141.5 billion (FY 2018) (US$ 1.3 billion)
- Net income: ▲JPY 7 billion (FY 2018) (US$ 66 million)
- Number of employees: 4,154 (consolidated, as of March 31, 2026)
- Website: Official website

Takasago International Corporation (高砂香料工業株式会社, Takasago Kōryō Kōgyō Kabushiki-gaisha) is a major international producer of flavours and fragrances headquartered in Japan, with presence in 27 countries and regions worldwide. Takasago ranked 8th overall and 1st in Asia on the Global Top Food Flavours and Fragrances Companies list published by FoodTalks in 2021.

== History ==
Takasago International Corporation was founded on 9 February 1920 as the Takasago Perfumery Company Limited. In 1938, the headquarters of Takasago was moved to Taihoku (modern-day Taipei), and in 1940, a branch office and factory were set up in Shanghai. In 1945, the Taipei headquarters and Shanghai office were taken over by Republic of China.

In 1951, the Takasago Chemical Company in Taipei was closed and a new company, Takasago Chemical Industry Company was founded. The new company later changed its name to Takasago Perfumery Industry Company and merged with Takasago Perfumery Company.

During the 1960s, Takasago established offices in New York City and Paris, and their headquarters were moved to Hatchoubori 2–11, Chūō Ward. In 1963, Takasago Company Limited was listed in the Tokyo 2nd stock market, but by 1969 they were listed in the Tokyo 1st stock market. Since then the company has opened offices around the world.

In 2010, Takasago ranked fifth in the list of the world's major aroma and perfume producers.

Takasago is a member of the European Flavour Association.

== Awards and honors ==
In 2001, Takasago's member of Board of Directors Ryōji Noyori won the 2001 Nobel Prize for Chemistry for the study of chirally catalyzed hydrogenations.

== Competitors ==
Major competitors of Takasago include Firmenich, Döhler, International Flavors and Fragrances, Givaudan, and Symrise.
