= Atelier Cologne =

Perfume company

Atelier Cologne is a niche perfume line owned by L'Oréal. Founded in 2009 by Sylvie Ganter and Christophe Cervasel, Atelier Cologne is best known for unisex citrus scents like Orange Sanguine.

== History ==
Founded in 2009 by fragrance industry veterans Sylvie Ganter (chemist from Marseille) and Christophe Cervasel (perfumer from Toulouse), who married in 2014, Atelier Cologne was originally based in Paris and New York. Atelier Cologne has worked with perfumers Jérôme Epinette, Ralf Schwieger and Cecile Hua (Grand Néroli).

L'Oréal acquired the company in 2016, part of a broader trend of multinational groups buying niche fragrance lines and putting them into wider distribution.

== Products ==
Initially focused on unisex citrus scents, Atelier Cologne developed a line of "colognes absolues": in perfumery, "cologne" can refer to the concentration strength of a formula (an eau de cologne containing a smaller percentage of perfume oil than an eau de toilette, which in turn has less than an eau de parfum). But "cologne" can also be a qualitative descriptor, historically describing citrus and herbal blends like the benchmark 4711 from Cologne, Germany. Atelier Cologne's "colognes absolues" took inspiration from that style, but made their fragrances more concentrated: an absolue in perfume terms. Though the line expanded to include other styles, like florals, Atelier remains best known for unisex citrus scents like Orange Sanguine, Pomelo Paradis, and Pacific Lime.

In addition to perfume, Atelier also makes matching scented body products (shower gels, soaps, lotions) and candles.

=== Perfumes ===
Perfumes by year released:

- 2010: Bois Blonds, Grand Néroli, Oolang Infini, Orange Sanguine, Trèfle Pur
- 2011: Vanille Insensée
- 2012: Ambre Nue, Rose Anonyme, Vétiver Fatal, Sous le toit de Paris
- 2013: Mistral Patchouli / Patchouli Riviera, Silver Iris, Gold Leather
- 2014: Cédrat Enivrant, Blanche Immortelle, Santal Carmin, Rendez-Vous
- 2015: Pomélo Paradis, Sud Magnolia, Mandarine Glaciale, Cedre Atlas, Figuier Ardent, Oud Saphir, Jasmin Angélique, Musc Impérial
- 2016: Bergamote Soleil, Philtre Ceylan, Encens Jinhae, Poivre Electrique, Mimosa Indigo, Tobacco Nuit, Citron d’Erable, Camelia Intrepide, Emeraude Agar, Clémentine California
- 2017: Café Tuberosa
- 2018: Iris Rebelle, Pacific Lime
- 2019: Rose Smoke
