= Frédéric Malle =

French perfume entrepreneur

Frederic Malle
- Born: Pierre Frederic Serge Louis Jacques Malle; 17 July 1962 (age 64); Paris, France
- Occupations: perfume industry businessman, author, company founder
- Known for: Editeur de Parfams
- Family: uncle Louis Malle (film director, producer and screenwriter)
- Website: Official website

Pierre 'Frédéric' Serge Louis Jacques Malle (born 17 July 1962 in Paris, France) is a French businessman, author and 'Editeur de Parfums' who founded the perfume house Editions de Parfums Frédéric Malle in 2000.

== Personal life ==
Frédéric Malle was born in Paris and is the son of Marie Christine Hetfler-Louiche and Jean-François Malle. Marie was the former Art Director at Parfums Christian Dior, whilst Jean-François was a film producer who worked alongside his brother, director Louis Malle. In addition, Malle's maternal grandfather is Serge Heftler-Louiche who in 1947, created the Parfums Christian Dior line for the fashion house with the launch of the perfume Miss Dior. He has a brother, Guillaume.

Malle lives on Fifth Avenue, New York with his wife Marie: they have four children, Louise, Lucien, Paul and Jeanne.

== Early career ==
As a young man, Malle was more interested in the marketing and art direction side of the perfume business and wanted to emulate the career of Jacques Helleu, the Art Director at Chanel. To this end, he attended New York University where he read Art History and Economics. Upon graduating, Malle worked for several photographers before moving into advertising. He was then offered the role of becoming Jean Amic's assistant at Roure Bertrand Dupont, a company that creates the raw materials used in perfumery. He briefly worked in the UK before returning to France with the aim of becoming "a French Ann Gotlieb", an American woman who acted as a go-between for marketing professionals and perfumers. Finding little success in this field, Malle consulted for Hermès under Jean-Louis Dumas, before doing the same for Christian Lacroix at LVMH. During his time with Dumas, Malle was sent to perfumery school for two months where he learned from perfumers such as Françoise Caron, Edouard Flechier & Jean Guichard. Following this, Malle went on to launch his own perfume house Éditions de Parfums Frédéric Malle.

== Editions de Parfums Frédéric Malle ==
Malle does not create the perfumes for Editions de Parfums Frédéric Malle, instead he acts as an 'Editor' working alongside the perfumer. Initially the creative process started with a mood board or more formal brief, however, it is now started with a conversation between Malle and the perfumer. The level of input Malle has varies for each fragrance; for Dominique Ropion's Carnal Flower, Malle smelled 690 different iterations, whilst for other creations he can be non-interventionist. For Malle, there is only one rule perfumers have to follow when creating a perfume for the house; "Eliminate all that is superfluous or merely decorative".

Malle wanted the perfumers to receive credit for their creations, and as such openly advertises the perfumer behind the scent, which includes placing the perfumers name on the bottles and boxes. This acknowledgment of the perfumer was a decision that perfume critic Chandler Burr described as "all-but-revolutionary". The reason Malle gives for crediting the perfumers was that he "thought it was so unjust to always hide perfumers like ghostwriters; I wanted them to be in the limelight", whilst also lamenting that since perfumers rarely received credit, the general public would be under the illusion that "Opium was made by Mr. Saint Laurent himself and that Coco created Chanel No. 5".

The house launched in 2000 with nine perfumes, amongst these was Le Parfum de Thérèse by Edmond Roudnitska. Whilst Roudnitska died in 1996, Le Parfum de Thérèse was a perfume he had initially created in the 1950s for his wife Thérèse, who was the only person allowed to wear it. Following Roudnitska's death, Thérèse passed it on to Malle to ensure that it would be remembered. Another best-selling fragrance from 2000 was Angeliques Sous La Pluie, a rain-scented fragrance created by Jean-Claude Ellena. As of November 2017, the house has 29 perfumes created by 16 different perfumers. The most popular fragrances of Éditions de Parfums Frédéric Malle today are Portrait of a Lady, Carnal Flower, Musc Ravageur, French Lover, The Night and L'Eau d'Hiver.

In January 2015 Editions de Parfum Frédéric Malle was sold to Estée Lauder for an undisclosed fee.

=== Parfums ===
- Musc Ravageur - Maurice Roucel (2000)
- Une Fleur de Cassie – Dominique Ropion (2000)
- Le Parfum de Thérèse – Edmond Roudnitska (2000)
- Noir Épices – Michel Roudnitska (2000)
- En Passant – Olivia Giacobetti (2000)
- Lipstick Rose – Ralf Schwieger (2000)
- Lys Méditerranée – Édouard Fléchier (2000)
- Iris Poudre – Pierre Bourdon (2000)
- Angéliques sous la Pluie – Jean-Claude Ellena (2000)
- Cologne Bigarade – Jean-Claude Ellena (2001)
- Bigarade Concentrée – Jean-Claude Ellena (2002)
- Vétiver Extraordinaire – Dominique Ropion (2002)
- Une Rose – Édouard Fléchier (2003)
- L’Eau d’Hiver – Jean-Claude Ellena (2003)
- Carnal Flower – Dominique Ropion (2005)
- French Lover – Pierre Bourdon (2007)
- Outrageous! – Sophia Grojsman (2007)
- Dans Tes Bras – Maurice Roucel (2008)
- Géranium pour Monsieur – Dominique Ropion (2009)
- Portrait of a Lady – Dominique Ropion (2010)
- Dries Van Noten - Bruno Jovanovic (2013)
- Eau De Magnolia – Carlos Benaim (2014)
- Cologne Indélébile - Dominique Ropion (2015)
- The Night - Dominique Ropion (2016)
- Monsieur. - Bruno Jovanovic (2016)
- Superstitious - Dominique Ropion (2016)
- Outrageous! Limited Edition - Sophia Grojsman (2017)
- Sale Gosse - Fanny Bal (2017)
- Promise - Dominique Ropion (2017)
- Music For A While - Carlos Benaïm (2018)
- Dawn - Carlos Benaïm (2018)
- Rose et Cuir - Jean-Claude Ellena (2019)
- The Moon - Julien Rasquinet (2019)
- Synthetic Jungle - Anne Flipo (2021)
- Uncut Gem - Maurice Roucel (2022)
- Heaven Can Wait - Jean-Claude Ellena (2023)
