= AeDES (engineering) =

AeDES (Agibilità e Danno nell'Emergenza Sismica) is a printed Rapid Post-Earthquake Damage Evaluation form, from GDNT (Italian national seismic protection group). It is used by Italian qualified civil engineers to assess the structural damage of buildings after an earthquake. The AeDES Form is used from the civil protection technical staff since June 1998 to survey damage in the after-shock. The form has 9 sections. This tool allows for the definition of the conformity or non-conformity of a building. The form is scanned and digitized for further evaluations. Information about position of the building, classification, material, structural typology, damage of the current event and previous damage are object of this form.
