= Mariage Frères =

French tea company

- Product type: Tea
- Current owner: Kitti Cha Sangmanee, Frank Michel Desains
- Country: France
- Introduced: 1854
- Previous owners: Marthe Cottin, Henri Mariage, Edouard Mariage, Richard Bueno
- Website: www.mariagefreres.com

Mariage Frères (French, Mariage Brothers) is a French gourmet tea house and company, based in Paris. It was founded on 1 June 1854 by brothers Henri and Edouard Mariage.

== History ==
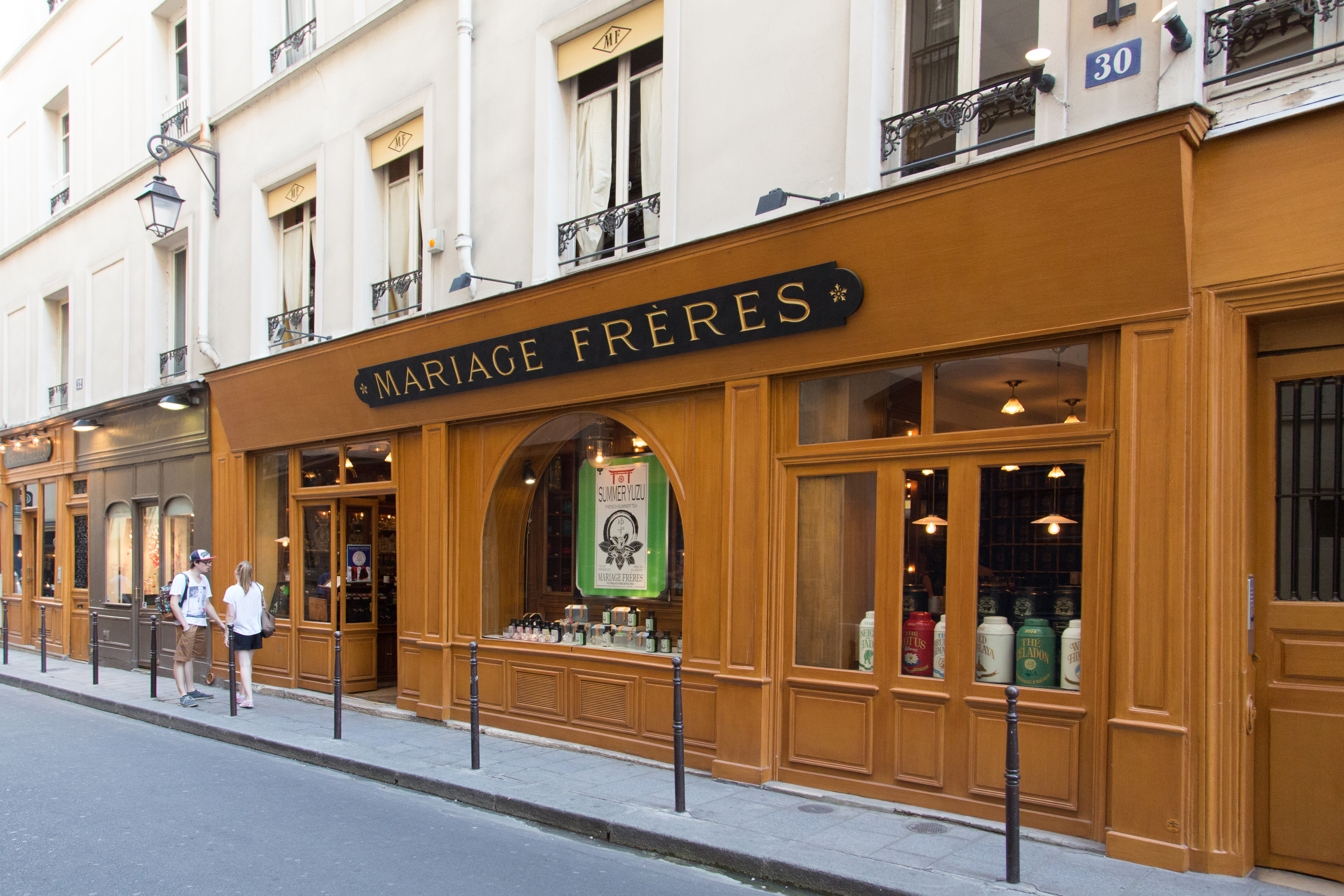
Mariage Frères, 30 Rue du Bourg-Tibourg, Paris.

The tea trade in France began to boom in the middle of the 17th century. At this time, King Louis XIV and the French East India Company encouraged the exploration of distant lands in the search of exotic goods. Around 1660, Nicolas and Pierre Mariage began voyaging on behalf of the royal court: Pierre was sent to Madagascar on a mission for the French East India Company, while Nicolas made several trips to Persia and India before being named part of an official deputation sent by Louis XIV to sign a trade agreement with the Shah of Persia. Successive generations of the Mariage family remained in the tea trade and in 1843, by then reflecting their experience and knowledge of the tea trade, members of the Mariage family opened their first wholesale shop in Paris.

On 1 June 1854 Henri and Edouard Mariage, founded the present-day Mariage Frères Tea Company. For over 130 years the company was managed by four generations of Mariage tea merchants who maintained a wholesale-only business from their Parisian warehouse. The business consisted of importing premium quality leaf teas from the Orient, which were then traded to first class hotels and tea shops in France.

In 1983 the company transformed itself from a wholesale import firm into a retail company. Under the leadership of Kitti Cha Sangmanee and Richard Bueno, Mariage Frères started opening tea houses within central Paris. The first tea emporium and tea salon, located on 30 rue du Bourg-Tibourg, opened in the same building where Henri Mariage had his offices over 150 years ago. The 19th-century colonial and exotic furniture, cash registers, counters and tea instruments come from the historic former tea office and deposit in Rue du Cloître-Saint-Merri.

Today, the company operates over 30 Mariage Frères points-of-sale within France, the United Kingdom, Germany and Japan. There are five Mariage Frères tearooms in Paris. The brand is also distributed through a network of resellers in over 60 countries, served in grand hotels such as the Meurice in Paris, Claridge's in London, Mandarin Oriental Hotel in Bangkok and Singapore as well as being offered to first-class voyagers on Japan Airlines.

In the early 2000s, an online shop (available in French, English, and Japanese) with worldwide distribution was launched.

There is one unique production platform in Paris for Europe, as well as for the rest of the world, and another platform for distribution only in Japan.

== Products ==
Mariage Frères' modern product range encompasses teas, tea blends, grand cru teas, tea accessories, teaware and products associated with the company's culinary interpretation of tea. The company states that each of its maisons contains a collection of more than 1,000 teas, combining original compositions with grand cru teas. Its range includes black, green, white, yellow, blue and matured teas, as well as non-tea infusions such as rooibos. The company also produces its own teapots, tea services and tea accessories, a practice it associates with the development of its retail business from 1984 onwards.

=== Blends ===
Blended and flavoured teas form an important part of Mariage Frères' range. The company describes some of its most prominent products as original compositions, alongside teas sourced from individual plantations and estates. Among its best-known compositions is Marco Polo, which the company describes as one of its iconic blends. Other collections include flavoured Earl Grey teas, scented green teas and a variety of compositions combining tea with floral, fruity, spicy and other aromatic notes. The company's present catalogue distinguishes these compositions from its grand cru and single-origin teas while presenting both as part of the broader Mariage Frères collection.

=== Tea cuisine ===
Mariage Frères also produces products connected with its Cuisine au Thé concept. These include culinary ingredients such as matcha powder, matcha salt and green-tea sesame, as well as books containing recipes developed around tea. The company's La Cuisine au Thé collection includes 40 recipes by its chefs and pastry chefs, organised around flavour categories including spicy, green, floral and fruity preparations, cocktails and tea-flavoured delicacies. A separate collection of tea-cuisine recipes includes preparations using tea in salads, fish, meat, desserts and drinks.

== Gastronomy ==
Mariage Frères operates tea salons and restaurants in which tea is incorporated into food and pâtisserie. The company refers to this approach as Cuisine au Thé, using tea as an ingredient, flavouring or spice in both savoury and sweet preparations. The concept developed alongside the company's move into retail in the 1980s: according to Mariage Frères' historical account, its tea salon became the first of its kind to offer brunch in Paris and subsequently became associated with a tea-based cuisine and pâtisserie in which tea occupied an important place in recipes. The salon also became a meeting place for people from the worlds of fashion, cinema, theatre and the press.

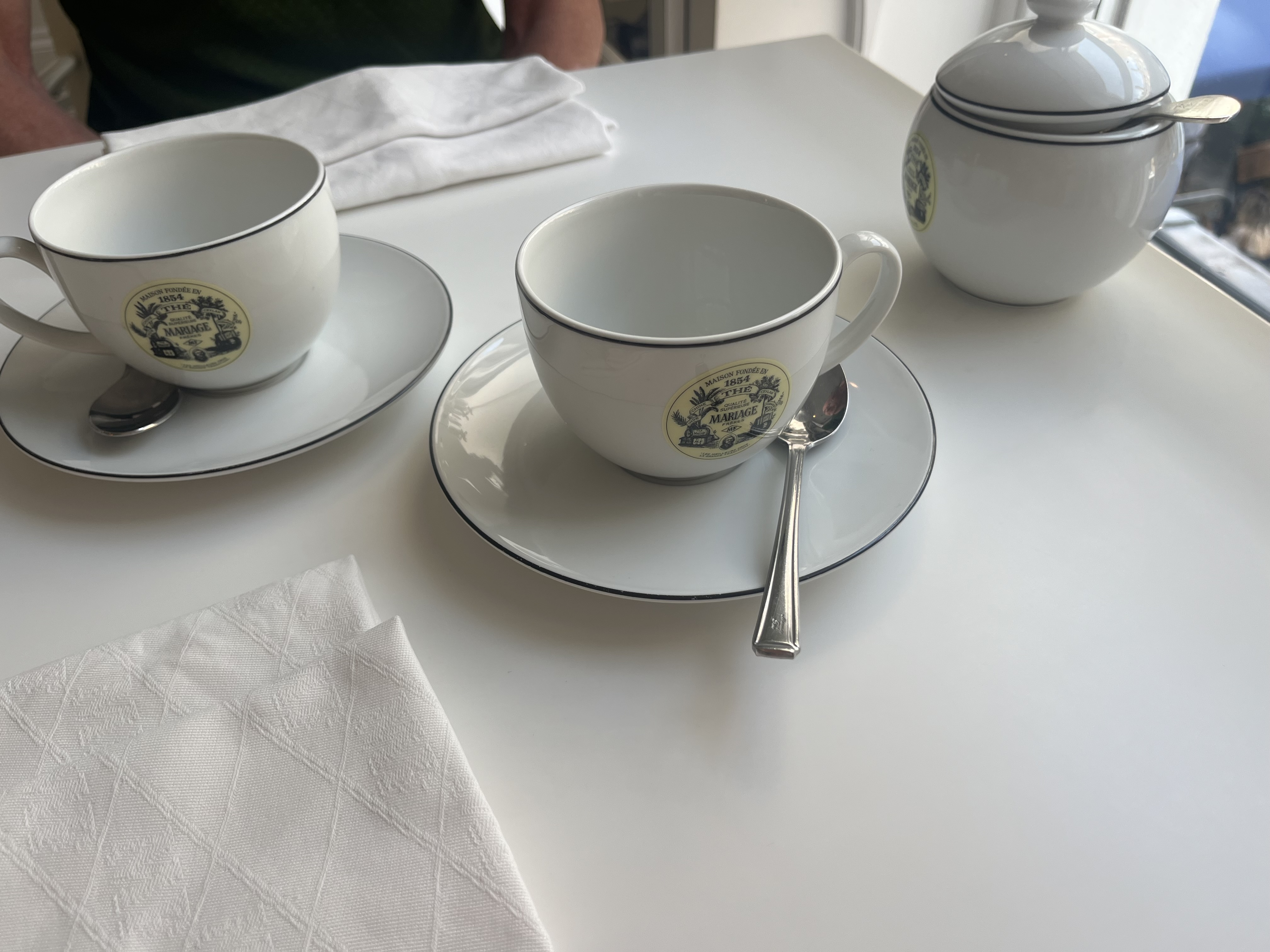
An array of Mariage Freres teacups.

The gastronomic concept continues at the company's London flagship in Covent Garden. The 100-cover Salon de Thé offers breakfast, brunch, lunch, afternoon tea and dinner, with tea incorporated throughout the menus. The company also describes the London Maison as offering cocktails made with tea, while the Covent Garden establishment combines its restaurant and tea room with the company's retail collection and tea museum.

== Tea Museum ==
Mariage Frères maintains a museum devoted to the history and material culture of tea. The museum was founded and expanded by Richard A. Bueno and contains objects associated with the company's historical tea trade, including oak blending chests, commercial tea chests, herbalist boxes, teapots, travel cases, sample cases and historical archives. Its displays also include East Asian furniture and lacquered objects, linking the material culture of tea preparation and storage with the long-distance trade through which tea reached Europe. The collection is presented by the company as part of its broader interpretation of the French art of tea and the history of the Mariage family's trade.

The museum is incorporated into some of Mariage Frères' contemporary retail establishments. At the Covent Garden Maison, it occupies part of the multi-storey flagship alongside the tea emporium and restaurant. The London museum displays tea chests, caddies, canisters, teapots, Chinese furniture and historical archives, providing a material-history component alongside the company's contemporary retail and gastronomic activities.

== Tea houses and interiors ==
Mariage Frères' tea houses combine retail, gastronomy and displays of objects associated with the historical tea trade. The company's historic Marais establishment retains vintage Chinese tea crates, scales, filters, scoops and antique counters that continue to be used, while the company describes the accumulated aroma of tea as having permeated the woodwork and walls over decades. Its book Mariage Frères French Tea: Three Centuries of Savoir-Faire, published by Rizzoli in 2003, presents the company's tea houses, tea rituals, recipes and interiors as part of its interpretation of French tea culture.

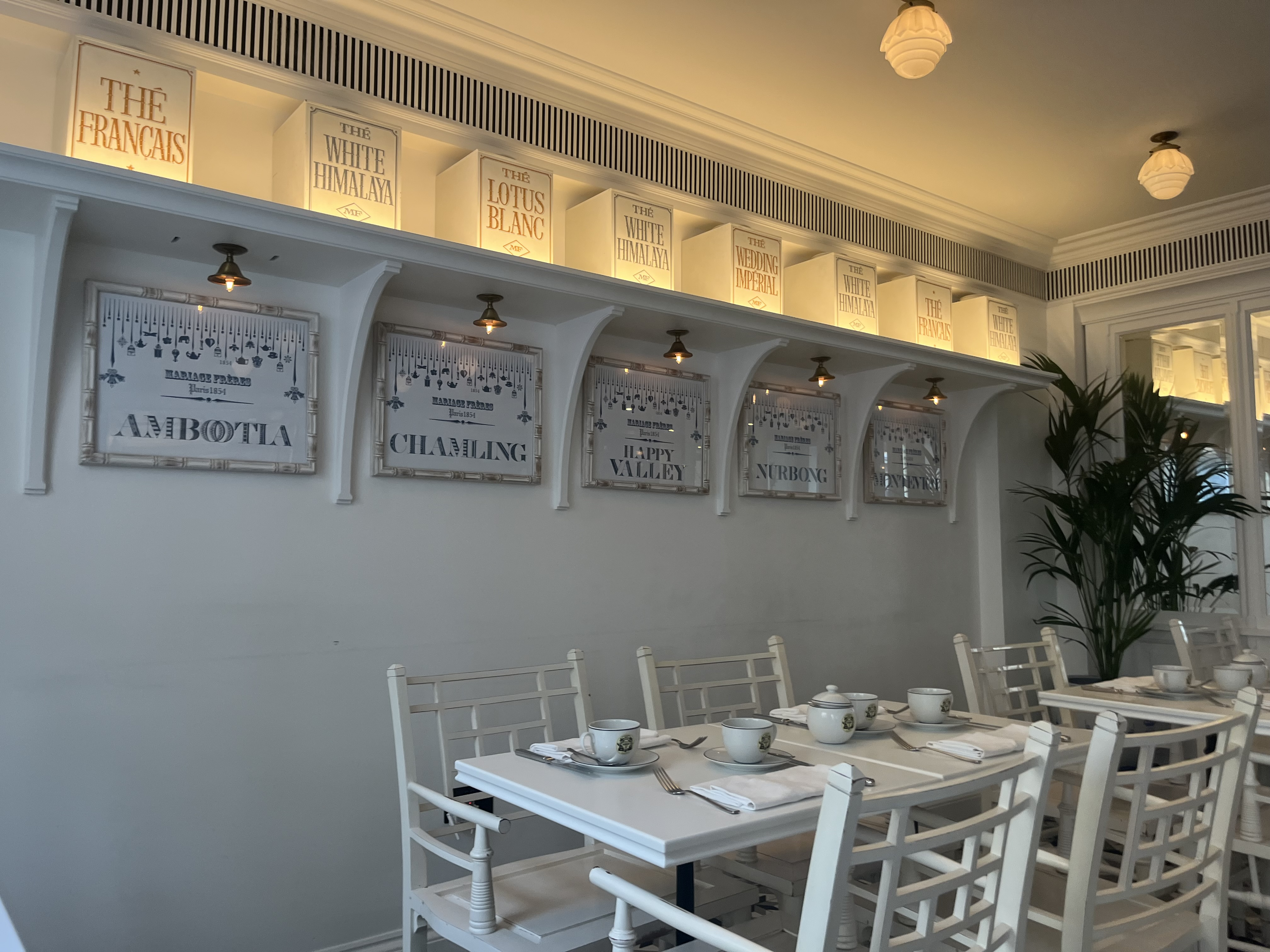
The interior of the Covent Garden branch’s salon.

The company has adapted this style to its international maisons while retaining a connection with its Parisian establishments. Its first Japanese flagship opened in Tokyo's Ginza district in 1990, occupying five floors and combining a tea counter with a tea room. The company states that the interior reflected the refined atmosphere of its Parisian establishments. The Covent Garden Maison similarly combines an emporium, restaurant, tea room and museum within a four-storey building, with the retail area centred on a large wall displaying the company's teas.

== Tea trade and sourcing ==
Mariage Frères presents its modern tea business as a continuation of the family's long involvement in overseas commerce. Its historical account traces members of the Mariage family to commercial journeys to Persia, the East Indies, India and Madagascar before the foundation of the tea company in Paris in 1854. The company states that Henri and Édouard Mariage established the Maison in Paris while maintaining trade with distant tea-growing regions including China and Ceylon. It subsequently supplied tea to wealthy households, fine-food shops, tea rooms and hotels.

The company's current sourcing model combines grand cru teas with original compositions and teas developed specifically for the Maison. Mariage Frères states that selected plantation plots are cultivated for and with the company and that some teas are conceived and worked “made to measure” for its collection under the Jardin Premier designation. The company says it prioritises quality over quantity, negotiates directly with planters and selects harvests according to its own quality standards.

== International retail and distribution ==
Mariage Frères' retail network expanded from its Parisian tea houses into international markets during the late 20th and early 21st centuries. Its first Japanese Maison opened in Ginza, Tokyo, in 1990, followed by additional establishments in Tokyo and other Japanese cities. In London, the company first established a counter at Selfridges in 2012 before opening its four-storey Covent Garden Maison in 2018. The company currently describes its shops and tea rooms as operating in France, Germany, England and Japan.

The company's distribution practices were the subject of a French competition investigation. In December 2023, the Autorité de la concurrence imposed a €4 million fine on the Mariage Frères group after finding that, for almost 15 years, it had restricted its distributors from selling branded products online and from reselling them to other retailers. The authority concluded that the practices restricted intra-brand competition and partitioned markets. The decision followed an investigation by the French Directorate General for Competition Policy, Consumer Affairs and Fraud Control.

== Legal disputes ==
=== TWG Tea ===
Mariage Frères became involved in a series of intellectual-property disputes with Singaporean tea company TWG Tea and individuals associated with the company. The French proceedings concerned allegations of trademark and copyright infringement, unfair competition and parasitism, with Mariage Frères arguing that TWG Tea had reproduced elements of the identity that it had developed around what it described as the French Art of Tea. Among the elements identified in the litigation were the presentation and organisation of tea shops, tea walls, antique-style tea boxes, table settings, tableware, floral decoration and a colonial-inspired visual style; the organisation and presentation of tea menus; the alphanumeric referencing of teas; the presentation of tea photographs; particular classifications and descriptions of teas; packaging and illustrations; and various tea names. Mariage Frères also alleged that former employees and associates had used confidential or privileged information and had contributed to the development of TWG Tea's competing presentation. The dispute therefore extended beyond individual trademarks to a wider claim that TWG Tea had reproduced aspects of the commercial and visual universe developed by Mariage Frères.

The French proceedings also concerned a number of individual trademarks and tea names. Mariage Frères relied on marks including SAKURA, WEDDING, BIRTHDAY TEA, PARIS SINGAPOUR, POLO CLUB, EARL GREY FRENCH BLUE, LUCKY NUMBER TEA and PLEINE LUNE, alleging that corresponding or similar names used by TWG Tea infringed its rights. The court proceedings considered, among other things, TWG Tea products named Sakura! Sakura! Tea, Grand Wedding Tea, Happy Birthday Tea, Paris-Singapore Tea, Polo Club Tea, French Earl Grey, Lucky Tea and Silver Moon. TWG Tea disputed the alleged infringements and argued that various elements relied upon by Mariage Frères were not sufficiently original or distinctive to receive the protection claimed. The litigation consequently involved separate assessments of individual trademarks, packaging, names and other elements rather than treating the entire concept of a luxury tea house as a single protected work.

The dispute also produced proceedings concerning Mariage Frères' SAKURA marks in the United Kingdom. TWG Tea opposed the registration of Mariage Frères' SAKURA SAKURA! application, which covered tea and tea-based beverages as well as a range of food products. The UK proceedings recorded that TWG Tea's founder, Taha Bouqdib, had previously been employed by Mariage Frères, having joined the company in 1993 and left in 2007. Mariage Frères argued that its SAKURA mark had been used for many years, including in the United Kingdom, and that the application by TWG Tea raised issues concerning the circumstances in which TWG's marks had been adopted. The proceedings illustrate the international nature of the dispute, with the companies contesting rights in related tea marks in both French and British intellectual-property systems.

A separate UK proceeding concerned Mariage Frères' application for SAKURA SAKURA! and an opposition brought by TWG Tea. The case reached the Appointed Person on appeal in 2019 after an earlier decision had dismissed much of TWG Tea's opposition. The application covered tea and tea-based beverages, non-medicinal infusions, flavourings, confectionery and other food products. The proceedings considered the respective rights of the two companies in relation to the SAKURA SAKURA! designation and demonstrate that the dispute continued through trademark proceedings in the United Kingdom after the principal French litigation had begun.

The French litigation eventually reached the Cour de cassation. In a judgment of 8 November 2017, the court rejected the appeals brought by Mariage Frères and Maisons de Thé Mariage Frères against the Paris Court of Appeal's 2015 decision. The case concerned claims against TWG Tea and associated individuals for trademark and copyright infringement, unfair competition and parasitism arising from alleged copying of elements of Mariage Frères' visual identity in several Asian countries. The Cour de cassation upheld the relevant reasoning concerning the applicable territorial scope of copyright protection and rejected Mariage Frères' arguments concerning unfair competition and parasitism. The proceedings also resulted in the loss of Mariage Frères' French French Tea trademark in respect of tea and tea-based beverages, with the court finding that the evidence supplied was insufficient to establish genuine use of the mark during the relevant period. Mariage Frères and Maisons de Thé Mariage Frères were ordered to pay the relevant costs, and the court rejected their appeal.

== References in popular culture ==
In Episode 11, Season 3 of American TV series Gossip Girl, Blair's mother, Eleanor, returns from a trip to Paris. Blair suspects her mother has been keeping a big secret from her. When she suggests that her mother opens an envelope she had just received, Eleanor replies: "But tea first. I have the most amazing Lapsang Souchong from Mariage Frères".

During the third leg of the American television series The Amazing Race, which aired on September 26, 2001, teams could attempt a Fast Forward requiring them to find a Mariage Frères tea shop in Paris and ask the store manager for a specific tea blend, L'Aventurier. Kevin and Drew successfully completed the task, winning the Fast Forward and bypassing the remaining tasks of the leg.

Mariage Frères teas feature in Deborah Harkness's 2011 novel A Discovery of Witches. The author has identified Thé des Impressionnistes, a green tea blended with flowers, as the favourite tea of the novel's protagonist, Diana Bishop. Mariage Frères is also mentioned in the novel in connection with Diana's tea-drinking habits and her time in Paris.

Mariage Frères teas are referenced in the Japanese anime Black Butler. In one episode, Mariage Frères Eros is identified as the tea being served with a pastry during a tea-time scene, providing a direct reference to one of the company's commercial blends within the series.

Mariage Frères has also been associated with the development of Bulgari's Eau Parfumée au Thé Vert. Perfumer Jean-Claude Ellena visited Mariage Frères in Paris while developing the fragrance and drew inspiration from the aromas of its loose-leaf teas. The fragrance was launched in the early 1990s and became an important early example of tea being used as a central theme in modern perfumery.
