= Perfumes: The Guide =

Perfume encyclopedia

- Author: Luca Turin
- Original title: Parfums. Le guide
- Language: French
- Publication date: 1994
- ISBN: 978-2866651794

Perfumes: The Guide is part of a series of books cataloguing major perfumes, written by Luca Turin and Tania Sanchez.

== Authors ==
Luca Turin and Tania Sanchez co-authored The Guide. The couple are married; he is a biophysicist and she is a perfume critic.

== Perfumes: The Guide and Perfumes: The A–Z Guide ==
In 1992, Turin published Parfums. Le guide (french), via publisher Hermé. A 2nd edition was published in 1994.

In 2008, Turin and Sanchez published an English-language edition, as Perfumes: The Guide. It began with introductory chapters on the basics of perfumery and then reviewed more than a thousand perfumes, giving a rating of one to five stars and a brief critical review, signed either LT or TS. These ranged from a single word (Sanchez on Lanvin Rumeur: "Baseless") to a few paragraphs.

In 2009, they published a paperback edition, titled Perfumes: The A–Z Guide, adding 451 reviews and Top 10 lists. In 2019, they re-issued it via publisher Perfüümista OÜ.

In 2019, they published an English translation of Turin's original book, as Perfumes: Parfums Le guide 1994 (english), also via publishing house Perfüümista OÜ.

== Perfumes: The Guide 2018 ==
In 2018, Turin and Sanchez released a companion volume, Perfumes: The Guide 2018, covering 1,200 fragrances released in the 10 years since the 2008 book.

== Reception ==
The Guide received a starred review in Publishers Weekly, which said, "The book brings [the authors'] exquisite connoisseurship to life in a contagious manner. Their passion for a few scents and their outrage at the others' failings make for entry after entry of hilarious, catty comments interspersed with occasional erudite, eloquent disquisitions." Other reviewers echoed the praise for the book's prose. In The Guardian, Hermione Hoby wrote, "Convincing the reader that perfume-making is an art form is easy for these authors: the real joy of this husband and wife's dazzlingly comprehensive compendium is in its case for perfume criticism as the even greater art." Likewise in Maclean's, Anne Kingston wrote, "Perfumes' metaphorically brilliant descriptors often qualify as art themselves." In The New Yorker, John Lancaster wrote that the authors "offer vivid, funny, evocative descriptions of the smells they write about...To enjoy "Perfumes," you don't need to know, or even to like, perfumes, such is the brio of Turin's and Sanchez's prose."

== See also ==
- Fragrance wheel

== Bibliography ==
- Turin, Luca; Tania Sanchez (2008). Perfumes: The Guide. Viking. ISBN 978-0-670-01865-9.
- Turin, Luca; Tania Sanchez (2009). Perfumes: The A–Z Guide. Penguin. ISBN 978-0-143-11501-4.
- Turin, Luca; Tania Sanchez (2018). Perfumes: The Guide 2018. Perfüümista OÜ. ISBN 978-9949885534.
- Turin, Luca; Tania Sanchez (2019). Perfumes: The A–Z Guide. Perfüümista OÜ. ISBN 978-9949889679.
