= L'Artisan Parfumeur =

Perfume company

- Type: Subsidiary
- Industry: Beauty
- Founded: 1976
- Founder: Jean Laporte
- Headquarters: Paris, France
- Products: Fragrances personal care
- Parent: Puig
- Website: Official website

L'Artisan Parfumeur is a French perfume house owned by Puig, which also owns British perfume house Penhaligon's.

== History ==
L’Artisan Parfumeur was established in 1976 by Jean Laporte. In 1982, he left the company, going on to form rival Maître Parfumeur et Gantier in 1988.

L'Artisan is based in Paris—the original store opened on Rue de Grenelle in 1979—but now has outlets worldwide.

L’Artisan's 2012 release Seville à l’aube was the subject of the book The Perfume Lover, a memoir by Denyse Beaulieu describing her collaboration with French perfumer Bertrand Duchaufour to develop the scent. Together they went through more than 100 modifications to develop the fragrance with notes of orange blossom, incense, smoke, beeswax, flowers and musk.

In January 2015, private equity firm Fox Paine & Company, then L’Artisan's owner, sold the company to the Spanish perfume group Puig (along with British perfume line Penhaligon's).

== Products ==
It specialises in unusual fragrances, working with master perfumers such as Michel Almairac, Evelyne Boulanger, Bertrand Duchaufour, Jean-Claude Ellena, Dora Baghriche-Arnaud, Elisabeth Maier, Karine Vinchon, Fabrice Pellegrin, Olivia Giacobetti, and Anne Flipo. The emphasis is on scents from nature. The most popular perfumes of L'Artisan Parfumeur are Mure et Musc Extreme, Timbuktu, Passage d'Enfer, Bana Banana, L'Ete en Douce.

The company sells candles and home fragrances as well as fragrances.

=== Perfumes ===
Fragrances (with date of release):

1978

- Vetiver
- Vanilia
- Tubéreuse
- Santal
- Mûre et Musc
- L'Eau d'Ambre

1979

- Patchouli
- L'Eau du Navigateur

1982

- La Haie Fleurie du Hameau
- Les Hesperédés de la Grande Sierre

1984

- Bouton d'Or

1985

- Orchidée Blanc
- L'Eau du Caporal

1989

- Alchimie Pourpre
- Eau des Merveilleuses

1990

- Riviéra Palace

1992

- Mimosa Pour Moi

1993

- Voleur de Roses
- Mûre et Musc Extrême
- L'Eau de L'Artisan

1994

- Premier Figuier

1996

- Thé Pour un Été
- Drôle de Rose

1997

- Méchant Loup
- L'Eau du Floriste

1998

- Navegar
- Sautes d'Humeur: A Rire
- Sautes d'Humeur: Reveuse
- Sautes d'Humeur: A Rien
- Sautes d'Humeur: Jalouse
- Sautes d'Humeur: Massacrante

1999

- Passage d'Enfer
- La Chasse aux Papillons
- Dzing!

2000

- Tea for Two
- Jacinthe des Bois
- Oeillet Sauvage
- Verte Violette
- Fleur de Carotte

2001

- Ambre Extrême
- Framboise Tralala
- Une Bouquet en Mai
- Thé des Sables

2002

- Safran Troublant
- Poivre Piquant
- Piment Brûlant
- Patchouli Patch

2003

- Bois Farine
- Premier Figuier Extrême
- Un Zeste D'Été

2004

- Ananas Fizz
- Jour de Fête
- Timbuktu
- Eau de Printemps

2005

- La Chasse aux Papillons Extrême
- Extrait de Songes
- Ambroisie Ararat
- Fleur d'Oranger 2005

2006

- Dzongkha
- Fleur de Narcisse 2006
- Fou d'Absinthe
- Mandarine Tout Simplement
- L'Été en Douce

2007

- L'Eau de Jatamansi
- Iris Pallida 2007
- Fleur d'Oranger 2007
- L'Echange

2008

- Fleur de Liane
- Aedes de Venustas
- Mûre et Musc Extrait

2009

- Côte d'Amour
- Vanille Absolument (first called Havana Vanille)
- Al Oudh

2010

- Nuit de Tubéreuse
- Coeur de Vetiver Sacré
- Traversée du Bosphore

2011

- Fleur d'Oranger 2011
- Mon Numero series (1, 3, 4, 6, 7, 8, 9, and 10)
- Batucada

2012

- Séville à L'Aube

2013

- Caligna eau de parfum
- Amour Nocturne
- Deliria
- Skin on Skin

2014

- Haute Voltige
- Rappelle-Toi
- Onde Sensuelle

2016

- Bucoliques de Provence
- Arcana Rosa 9
- Venenum 32
- Tenebrae 26
- Violaceum 2
- Glacialis Terra
- Mirabilis 60
- Bucoliques de Provence

2017

- Un Air de Bretagne
- Histoire d'Orangers
- Sur L'Herbe
- Au Bord de L'eau

2018

- Mont de Narcisse
- Mandarina Corsica
- Champ de Fleurs
- Champ de Baies
- L'Eau de L'Artisan

2019

- Le Chant de Camargue
- Bana Banana

2020

- Couleur Vanille
- Passage d'Enfer Extrême

2021

- Ode à l'Oudh
- Légendes du Cèdre
- Fables d'Orient
- Contes du Levant
- Bois des Sables
- Crepusculum Mirabile 63
- Obscuratio 25

2022

- Soleil de Provence
- Abyssae 33
- Musc Amarante
- Cédrat Céruse
- Vétiver Écarlate
- Tonka Blanc
- Iris de Gris
- Mémoire de Roses

2023

- Cuir Grenat
- À Fleur de Pêche

2024

- Il Était Un Bois

Some of these fragrances are no longer in production.

=== Limited editions ===
Beginning in 2005, L'Artisan has issued a limited edition "grand cru" soliflore perfume each year from a specific harvest of a particular flower. The creator of the fragrances is master "nose" Anne Flipo. Production is limited to a few thousand bottles each. The price is considerably higher ($250–$295 per 3.4 ounce bottle) and the packaging more elaborate than for the regular fragrances. These include:

- Fleur d'Oranger 2005 (Orange blossom harvest of April 2004 from Nabeul, Tunisia)
- Fleur de Narcisse 2006 (Narcissus harvest of June 6–7, 2005 from Lozère, France)
- Iris Pallida 2007 (Tuscan iris harvest of 2001). Iris scent molecules take three years to form in the roots (rhizomes) of the iris plant. These roots are dried, ground into colloidal powder, and treated with alcohol to make orris butter, the precious pure absolute of the Iris pallida plant. It takes 41 tons of iris root to produce one kilogram of rhizomal extract.
- Fleur d'Oranger 2007 (Orange blossom harvest of April 2006 from Nabeul, Tunisia)
