= Jo Malone London =

British fragrance brand

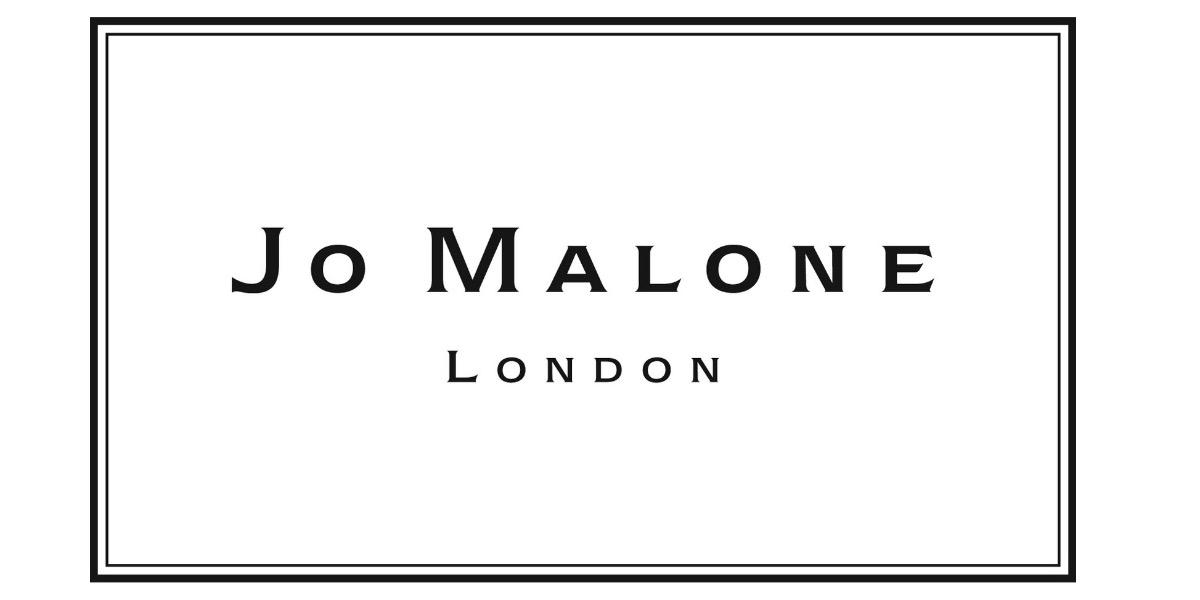
- Type: Subsidiary
- Industry: Cosmetics
- Founded: London, England (1990)
- Founders: Jo Malone CBE
- Products: Fragrance, Bath & Body
- Parent: Estée Lauder Companies (1999–present)
- Subsidiaries: RODIN olio lusso
- Website: Jo Malone London

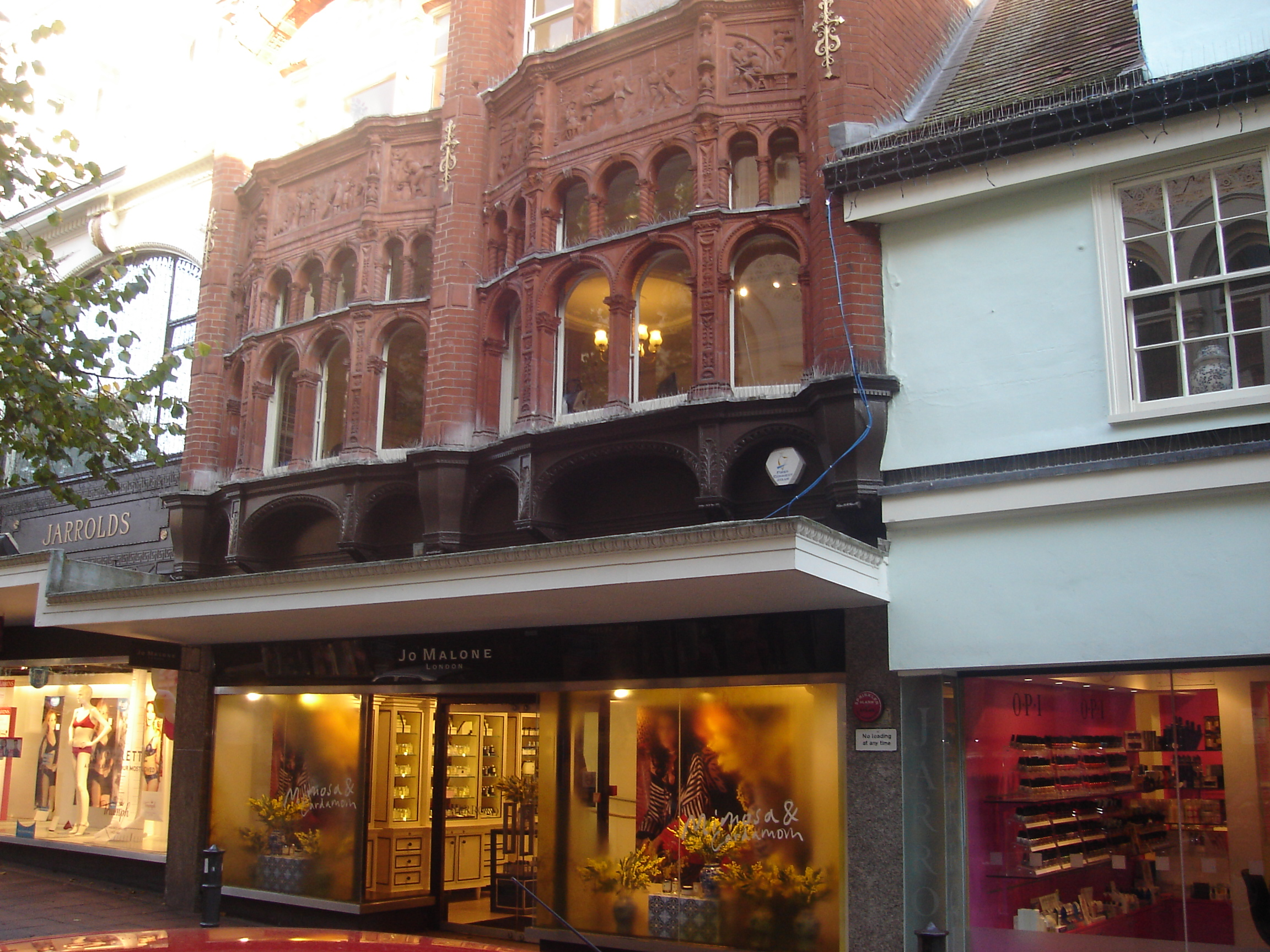
Jo Malone boutique in Norwich, England

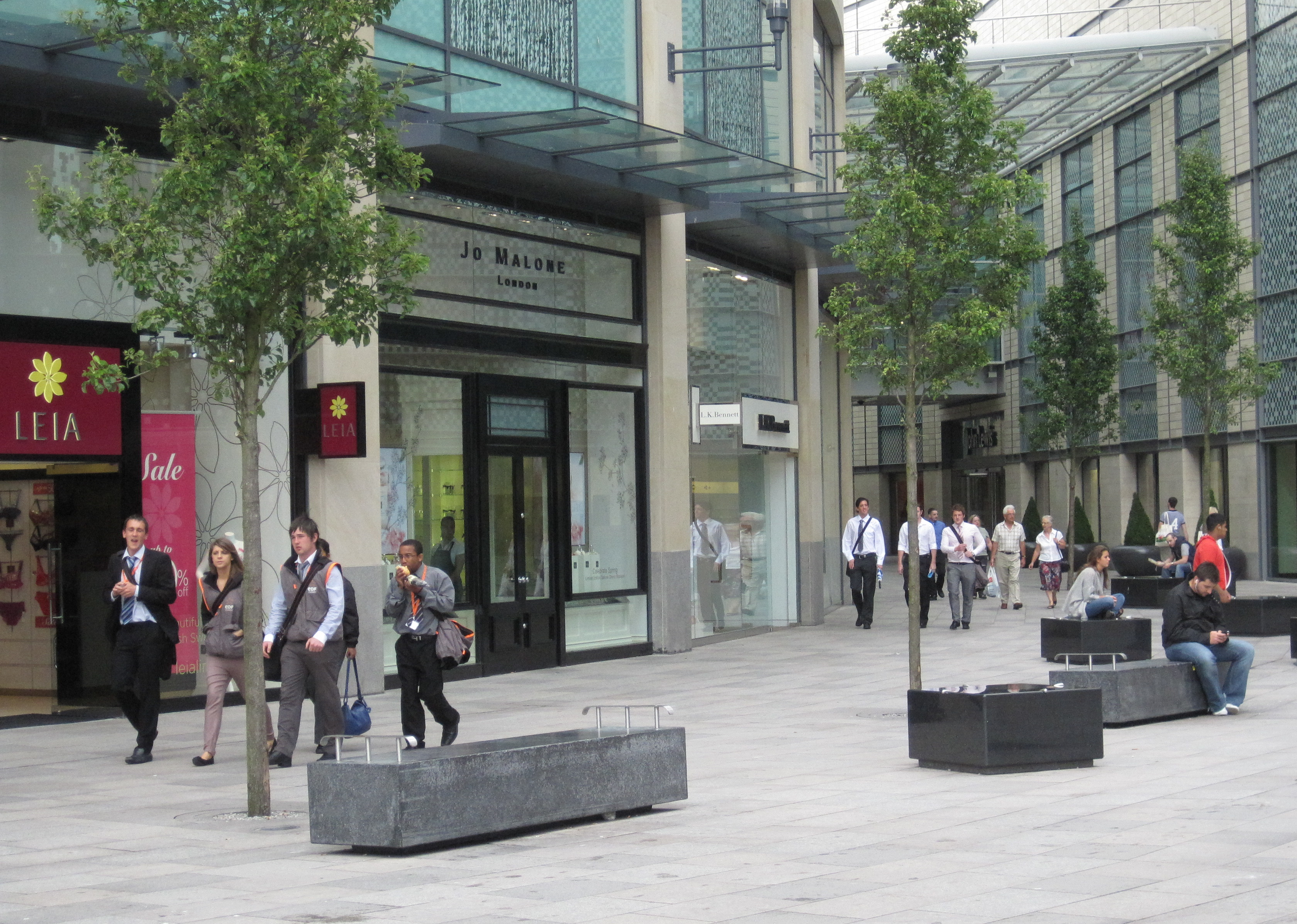
Jo Malone Store in Cardiff, Wales

Jo Malone London is a British multinational cosmetics company, perfume and scented candle brand, founded by Jo Malone in 1990. It has been owned since 1999 by Estée Lauder. The brand is known for its perfumes, candles, bath products, and room scents.

== Founding ==
The brand became popular in the United States following founder Jo Malone's appearance on The Oprah Winfrey Show. In 1999, Jo Malone London (JML) sold the company to Estée Lauder Companies for "undisclosed millions". Malone continued to work for the brand as creative director until 2006, and was barred from creating a new fragrance or skincare line for 5 years due to a non-compete agreement. She subsequently launched a new line, Jo Loves.

== Fragrances ==
Until 2014, the perfumer Christine Nagel created 47 scents for Jo Malone including Wood Sage & Sea Salt (2014), a skin scent of salt lingering on the body after a day at the beach, that in 2015, the Marie Claire International Fragrance Awards honored as the year's most daring fragrance for women.

== Marketing ==
The brand manager Jean-Guillaume Trottier joined Estee Lauder in 2004, and has worked for Jo Malone exclusively since 2012. Additionally Jo Malone has its own shops. The brand was introduced in Brazil, China, Korea, Philippines and Israel.

The brand's first brand ambassadors were English supermodel and musician Karen Elson and model and actress Poppy Delevingne.

In July 2019, the British actor John Boyega was named as first gent ambassador. In September 2020, he resigned as its global brand ambassador after the company replaced him with a Chinese actor in a version of an advertisement (designed to be shown in China) that he had created based on his upbringing in Peckham, London. The firm had earlier apologised to him for reshooting the commercial without his consent which it had called a "mistake". Jo Malone, the person, was greatly displeased by the incident saying "how dare [those associated with the brand]" do as they did without having spoken to Boyega about it. She further expressed dismay at the situation as people were confusing the brand and Malone herself, thinking she was responsible, when in fact she currently holds no position there.

In May 2024, Tom Hardy became the brand ambassador of Jo Malone London and the brand announced plans to expand its male fragrance offering.
