= Robertet Group =

French fragrance manufacturer

Robertet SA
- Type: Public
- Traded as: Euronext Paris: RBT; CAC Mid 60
- Founded: 1850; 176 years ago
- Headquarters: Grasse, France
- Key people: Philippe Maubert (President)
- Number of employees: 2,223 (2022)

Robertet SA (doing business as Robertet Group or Groupe Robertet) is a French fragrance and flavor manufacturer that specializes in natural raw materials, founded in 1850. Robertet is a member of the European Flavour Association. In 2021, Robertet ranked 12th on FoodTalks' Global Top 50 Food Flavours and Fragrances Companies list.

== Presentation ==
The group is a publicly traded, listed on the Euronext Paris with Ticker Symbol: RBT Robertet is among the top ten developers of flavor and perfume additives and ingredients. It operates factories in Grasse, France (headquarters) Turkey, South Africa, Madagascar, New Caledonia, Brazil, China, Singapore, UK and the US, and has a presence in about 50 countries.

Robertet is managed and controlled by the fourth and fifth generation of Maubert family members: Philippe Maubert (Chairman), Christophe Maubert (Head of the perfumery division), Olivier Maubert (Head of the Flavourings division), Julien Maubert (Raw Materials Director) and Arthur Le Tourneur d'Ison (Chief Growth officer).

The company controls each step in the process from the seed to the finished scent. Robertet specializes in the design, production, and marketing of aromatic products. Net sales break down by family of products as follows:

- Food flavors (40.2%)
- Perfume compositions and bases (37.4%)
- Natural aromatic products (22.4%)

The Group has worldwide subsidiaries and is represented in over 50 countries.

- 15 manufacturing sites
- 4 main R&D Innovation centers
- 14 Creative Centers

In May 2022, it was announced Robertet had acquired the UK-based natural food flavouring and extract manufacturer, Omega Ingredients.
