= BoutiqueAfricaine.com =

Canadian online marketplace

Boutique Africaine
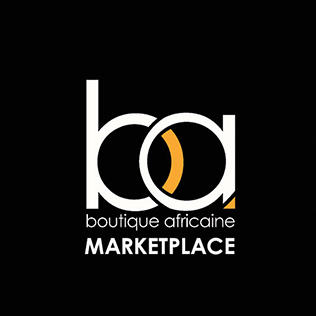
- Company type: Private
- Industry: Online shopping, Retail, Fashion
- Founded: 2016
- Founder: Franck Hounsokou
- Headquarters: Alberta, Canada
- Area served: Worldwide
- Key people: Franck Hounsokou
- Products: Retail; Handbags; Fashion; Home décor; Backpack, Kid's items
- Services: Online shopping, Online marketplace
- Website: boutiqueafricaine.com

BoutiqueAfricaine.com, also called Boutique Africaine, is an online marketplace for African clothing, home & living items and accessories based in Alberta, Canada. The website hosts designers who sell fashion products that are inspired by African culture and ethnicity.

== History ==
The company was founded by Franck Hounsokou as an online marketplace. By hosting designers worldwide on its platform, the website is able to fill in the market gap which was present due to the fact that African ethnic or cultural accessories could previously only be bought by going to Africa or via import.

The website charges a 15% commission from its sellers and does not allow them to sell any item that was not designed by themselves. The Boutique Africaine marketplace, however, allows both established as well as newer designers to register.

== Products and services ==
Boutique Africaine product categories include:

- Fashion
- Handbags
- Jewelry
- Backpack
