= Blauner =

Blauner is a surname. Notable people with the surname include:

- Bob Blauner (1929–2016), American sociologist, professor, and author
- Peter Blauner (born 1959), American author, journalist, and television producer
- Stephen Blauner (1933–2015), American music manager

== See also ==
- Launer
