= Lauener =

Lauener is a surname. Notable people with the surname include:

- Kuno Lauener
- Henri Lauener (1933–2002), Swiss philosopher

== See also ==
- Launer
