= Hervé Chapelier =

French fashion accessories company

- Industry: Retail
- Founded: 1976
- Founder: Hervé Chapelier
- Headquarters: Paris, France
- Area served: Worldwide
- Products: Handbags; Fashion accessories
- Website: www.hervechapelier.com

Hervé Chapelier (pronounced [ɛʁve ʃapəlje]) is a French fashion accessories company based in Paris that specializes in handbags.

== History ==
After his graduation in France, Hervé Chapelier moved to Los Angeles and started to make artisanal handbags to earn some money. His business grew. He moved back the France and founded the company Hervé Chapelier in 1976.

During the 1980s, he designed ample and colorful backpacks and handbags that were trendy in French high schools. In the 1990s, Hervé Chapelier launched a travel tote bag (similar to Longchamp's Le Pliage) that remained a classic, the '925'.

In 2005, the Galeries Lafayette were found guilty of copying Chapelier's bags.

In 2018, the company opened its first US store in the Royal Hawaiian Center.

== Description ==
Hervé Chapelier sells handbags, wallets, briefcases, tote bags, and backpacks. Since 2003, Hervé Chapelier bags have been made of cotton fabric. Nylon was previously used. Chapelier's signature is the refined appropriation of the duffel bag concept design cabas bags.

The company's first market is Japan, followed by Italy.

== See also ==
- Courtauld bag
