= Belen Echandia =

Defunct British fashion company

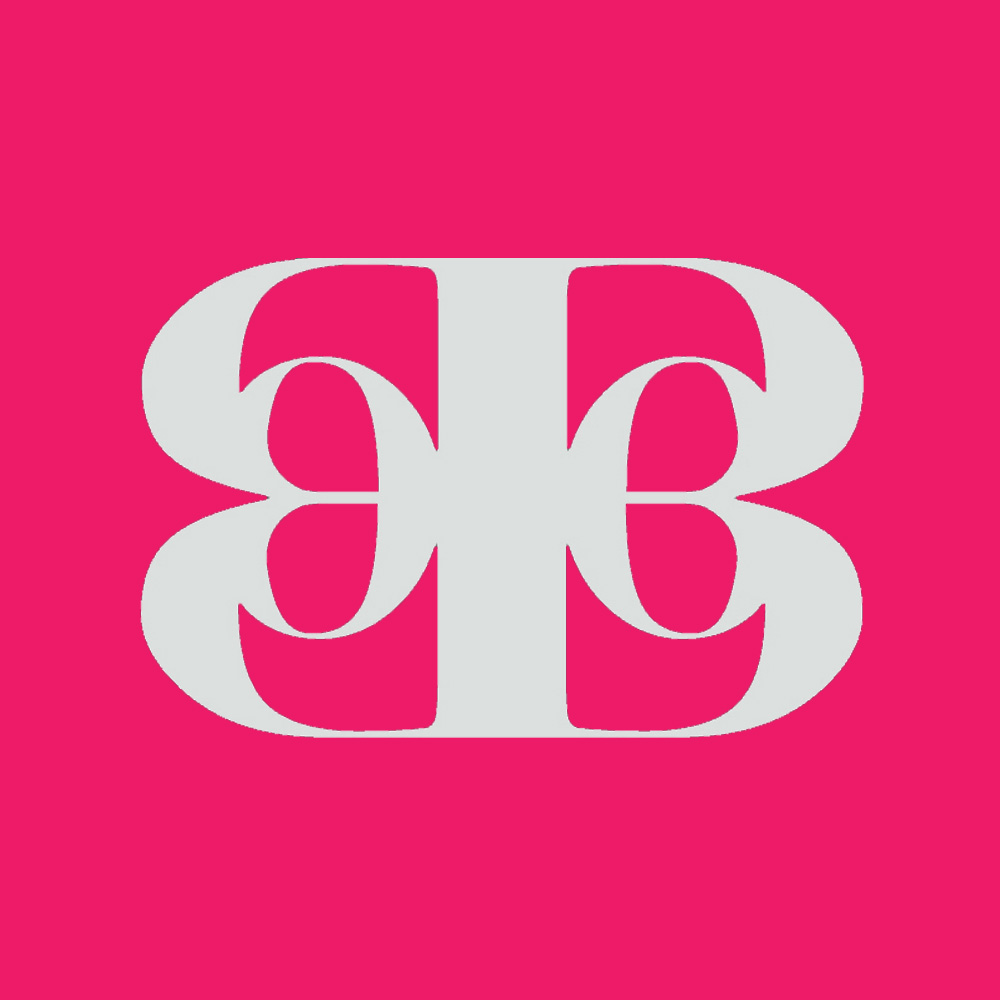
- Company type: Private
- Industry: Luxury goods
- Founded: 2005
- Founder: Jackie Cawthra (Founder & Creative Director)
- Headquarters: London, England
- Area served: Worldwide
- Products: Handbags and accessories
- Website: www.belenechandia.com

Belen Echandia was a handbag and fashion accessory design and manufacturing company. It was incorporated in 2005 and is based in London, England. Belen Echandia produces leather handbags, travel bags, wallets, clutch purses, and accessories for women.

== History ==
Belen Echandia was founded by Jackie Cawthra, whilst she was training to be a lawyer. Jackie says her idea came after experiencing a difference between Spain and London in the supply of luxury handbags. In 2004, Cawthra states she left the law practice to work solely on Belen Echandia.

Jackie Cawtha states that Belen Echandia was chosen as a Spanish girl's name which reflects the brand's Spanish origins.

== Products ==
In an interview for Hilary Fashion Jackie Cawthra says the company has been offering handbag collections since 2004. The names of the bags being said to be based on customer comments. Retailers that sell Belen Echandia products include Harvey Nichols in Dubai. Belen Echandia also launched a service on their website in 2009 where customers could design their own handbag. The BEC service that allowed customers to customise their handbags was discontinued in 2012.

In 2007, to mark Belen Echandia's introduction to London Fashion Week, Belen Echandia collaborated with Canadian leather artist Vivien Cheng, who hand-painted a one-off collection of six bags.

== In the media ==
In September 2005, as part of London Fashion Week, Belen Echandia was featured as part of the CNN program Design 360 presented by Dayna Hochfelder.

Belen Echandia has been mentioned in Vogue, Harper's Bazaar and The Daily Telegraph.
