= Launer =

Launer is a surname. Notable people with the surname include:

- Dale Launer (born in 1952), American comedy screenwriter
- S. John Launer (1919-2006), American television and film actor

== See also ==
- Launer London, British manufacturer of luxury handbags
- Lauener
