= Launer London =

British manufacturer of handbags and leather goods

- Industry: Luxury goods
- Founded: 1940
- Founder: Sam Launer
- Headquarters: Warlingham, Croydon, United Kingdom
- Products: Handbags
- Website: launer.com

Launer London is a British manufacturer of luxury handbags and other small leather goods founded in 1940 by Sam Launer, who emigrated to London from Czechoslovakia during the Second World War. The company first sold a handbag to a member of the British royal family in 1950 and subsequently was awarded a royal warrant by Queen Elizabeth II.

== History ==
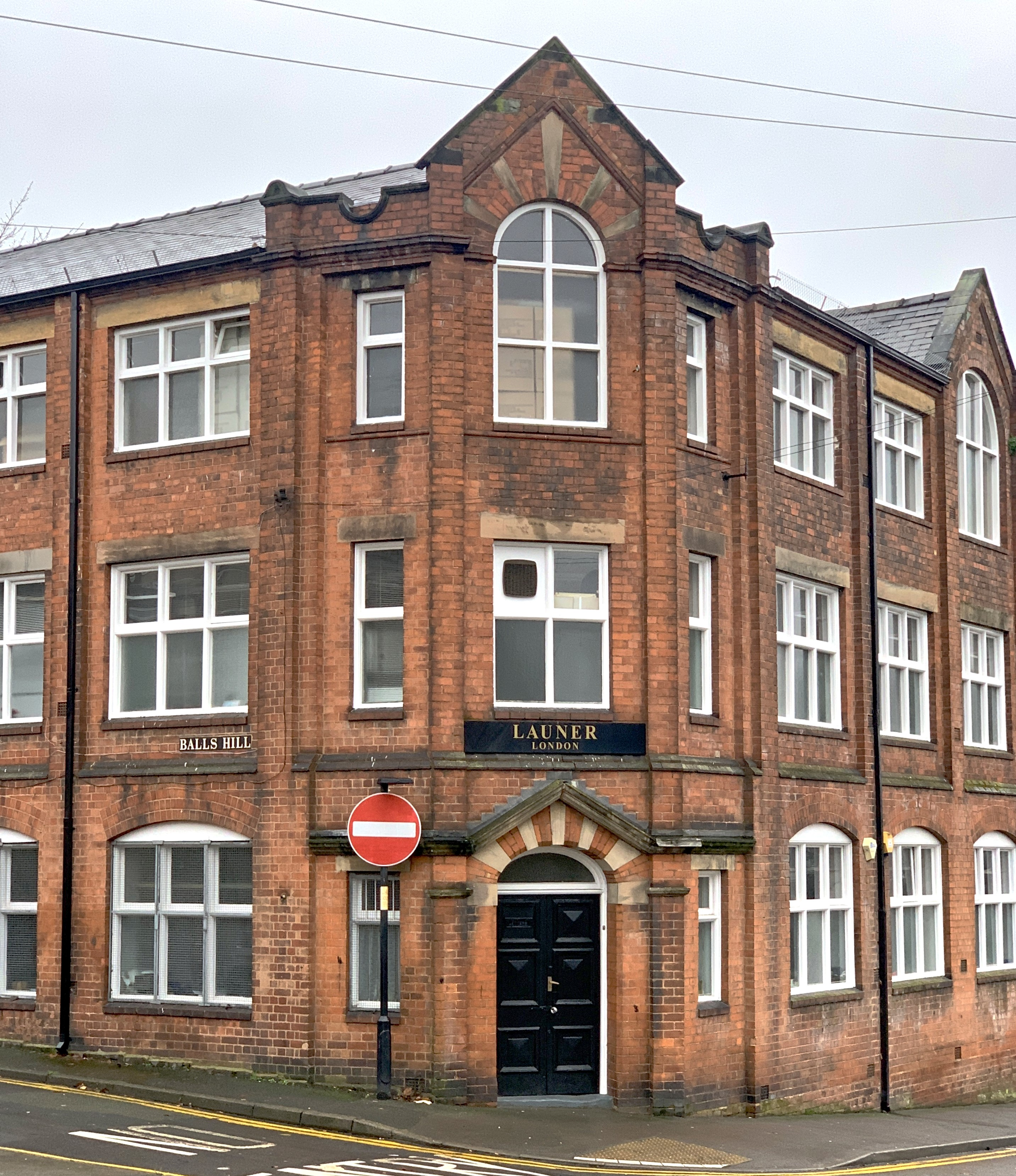
Launer London, Holtshill Lane, Walsall

In 1940, Sam Launer founded Launer London, and began making handbags in a small rented workshop in London's Soho district. He had left Czechoslovakia after it was occupied by Germany early in the Second World War. Launer died in 1955, and the company remained a family business until Gerald Bodmer purchased the company in 1981.

In 2011, Launer started producing bags in colours other than their traditional black, brown, and navy.

By 2019 turnover had risen 167% since the 2011 figure of £1.5 million. For the 52 weeks of 2018 Launer reported a 23% increase in turnover to £4 million.

== Royal warrant ==
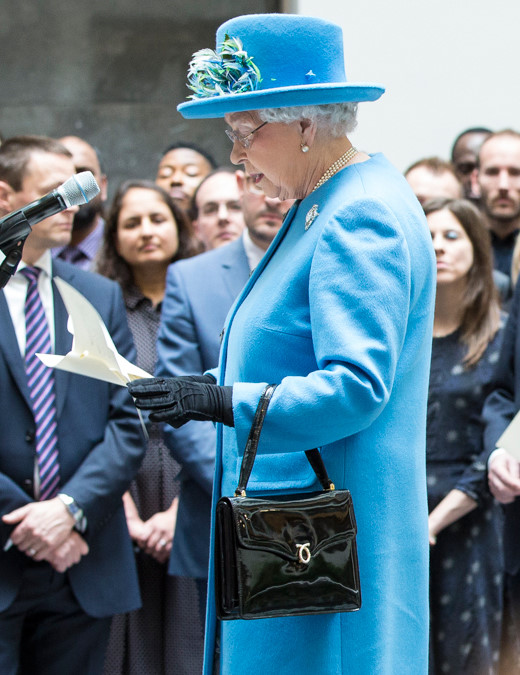
Queen Elizabeth II with a Launer bag in 2015

Queen Elizabeth the Queen Mother first purchased a Launer bag in the 1950s, and later gave one to her daughter, Queen Elizabeth II.

In 1968, Launer London were given a royal warrant by the Queen. She had bought more than 200 of their bags by 2019, according to CEO and owner Gerald Bodmer; and her three favourites appear to have been a black leather Royale, a black patent Traviata, and a third custom-made bag. She also kept all of her mother's Launer bags, according to Bodmer. The Traviata is Launer's bestselling design, partly due to the influence of The Queen; it is handmade in Walsall in the West Midlands, and sold for about £1,800 in 2019.

Prime Minister Margaret Thatcher regularly carried a Launer handbag, which was remarked upon as a characteristic. Gerald Bodmer first sent her one after seeing a cartoon of Thatcher whacking Argentina with her bag at the time of the Falklands War.

In June 2025, Launer was granted a royal warrant by Queen Camilla.
