= Handbag =

Handled bag used to carry personal items

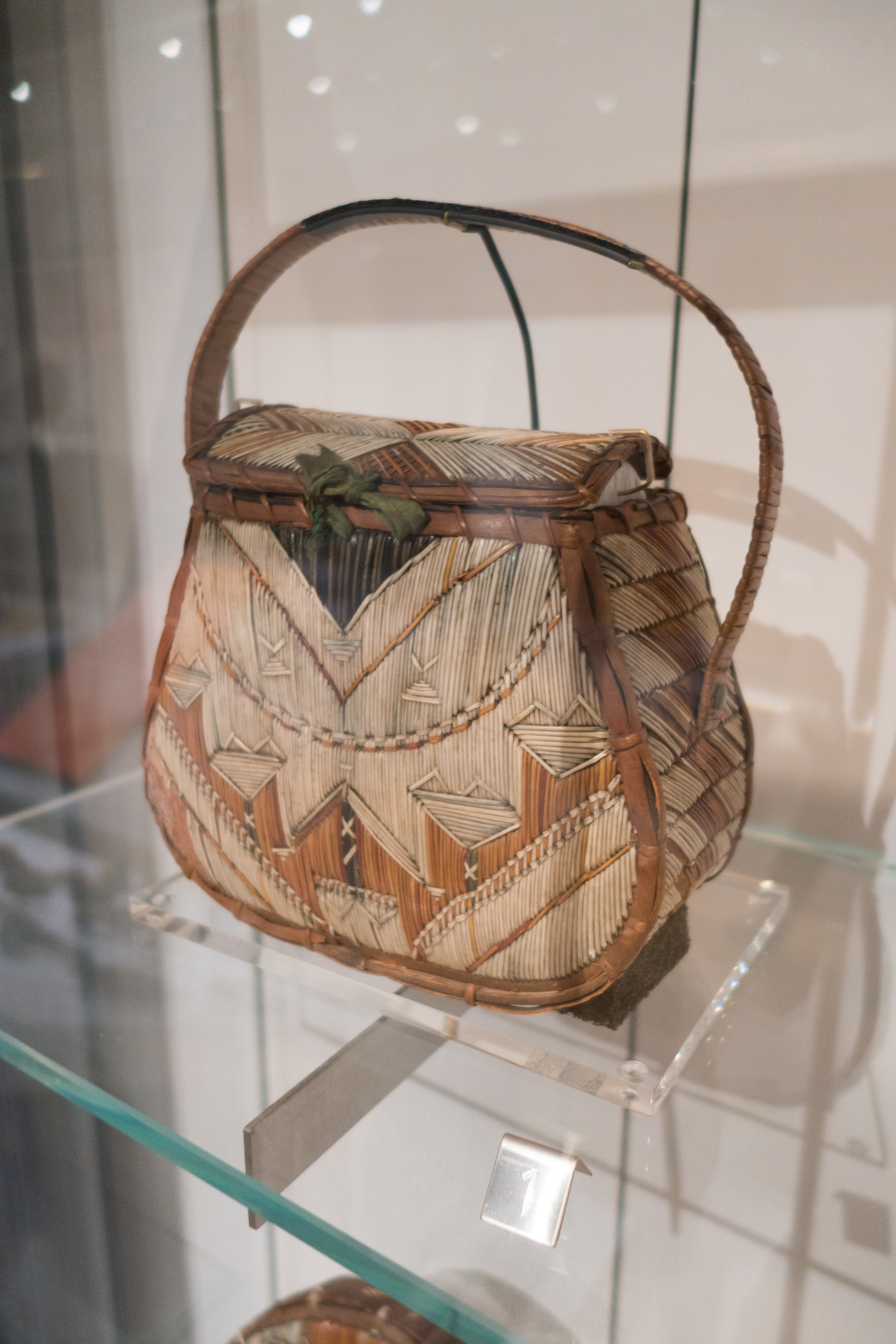
Mi'kmaq porcupine quill handbag

A handbag, commonly known as a purse in North American English, is a handled medium-to-large bag used to carry personal items. It has also been called a pocketbook in parts of the U.S.

== Terminology ==
The term "purse" originally referred to a small bag for holding coins. In many English-speaking countries, it is still used to refer to a small money bag.

A "handbag" is a larger accessory that holds objects beyond currency, such as personal items. American English typically uses the terms purse and handbag interchangeably. The term handbag began appearing in the early 1900s. Initially, it was most often used to refer to men's hand-luggage. Women's bags grew larger and more complex during this period, and the term was attached to the accessory.

"Pocketbook" is another term for a woman's handbag that was most commonly used in the United States in the mid-twentieth century.

== Origin ==
=== Antiquity ===
During the ancient period bags were used to carry items including flint, tools, supplies, weapons, and currency. Early examples of these bags have been uncovered in Egyptian burial sites (c. 2686–2160 BCE) and were made of leather with two straps or handles for carrying or suspending from a stick. The ancient Greeks made use of leather, papyrus and linen purses known as byrsa to store coins, which is the etymological origin of the English word "purse". The emergence of money further inspired the creation of drawstring purses, most commonly hung from a belt or kept in clothing folds.

A handbag was discovered with the remains of Ötzi, who lived between 3350 and 3105 BC. While one of the earliest discoveries of an ornate leather purse came from Anglo-Saxon Britain, dated circa 625 CE, revealed from the burial site of King Roewald in the mounds of Sutton Hoo in Suffolk. Although the leather had deteriorated, its gold ornaments were still intact. Inside the purse was forty gold coins and it was held in place by a gold belt buckle and golden hinged straps. These features symbolised a display of opulence, making the purse part of a lavish suite of possessions.

=== Medieval period ===
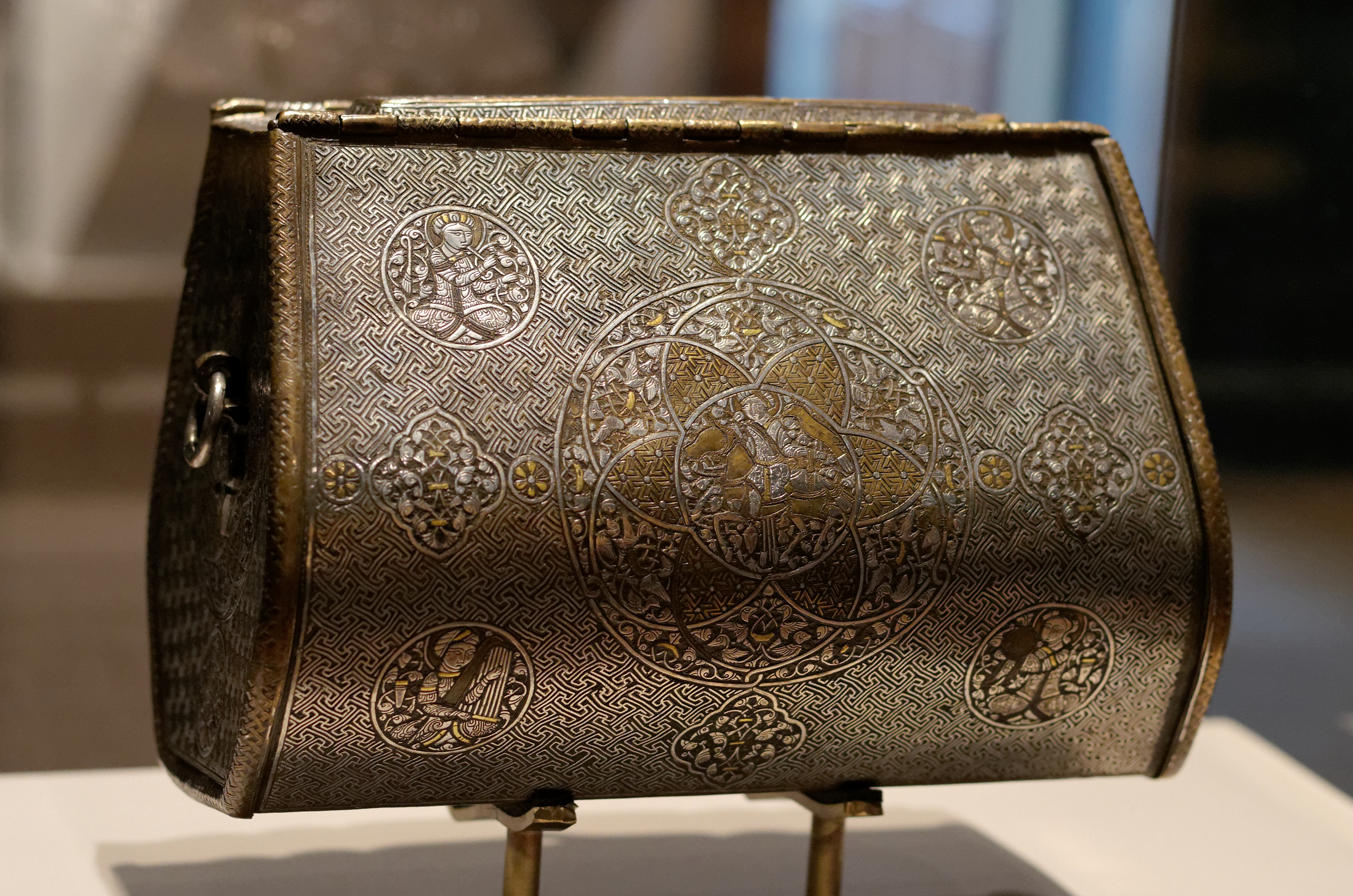
The Courtauld bag, thought to be the world's oldest surviving handbag

The Courtauld bag, tentatively believed to have been made at Mosul in the early 1300s, is thought to be the oldest surviving handbag in the world today. It likely belonged to an Ilkhanate noblewoman.

=== Modern origin ===
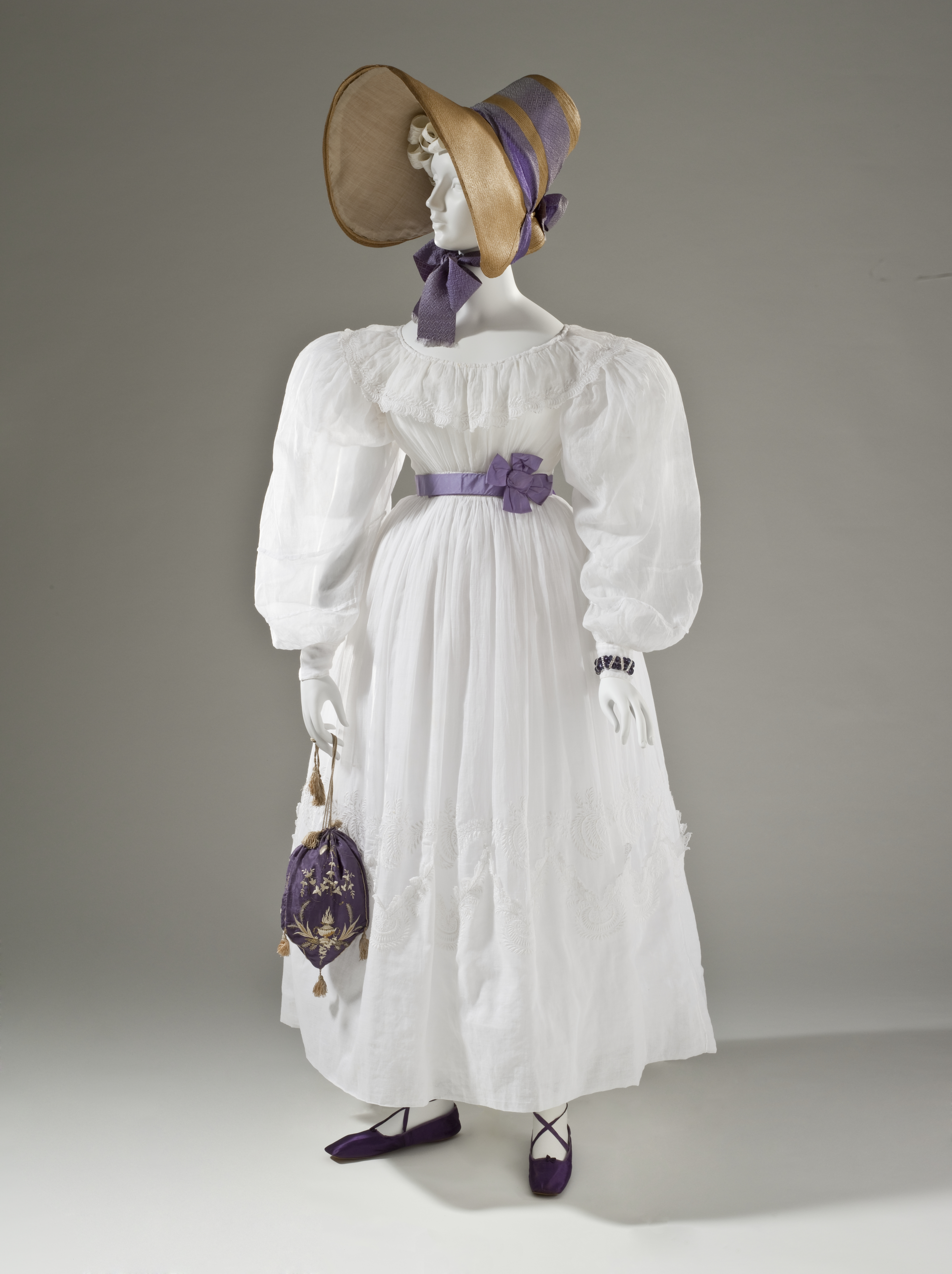
Women's fashion from 1830, including a reticule handbag from France

Until the late 1700s, both men and women carried bags. Early modern Europeans wore purses to carry coins. Purses were made of soft fabric or leather and were worn by men as often as ladies; the Scottish sporran is a survival of this custom. In the 17th century, young girls were taught embroidery as a necessary skill for marriage; this also helped them make very beautiful handbags.

By the late 18th century, fashions in Europe were moving towards a slender shape for these accessories, inspired by the silhouettes of Ancient Greece and Rome. Women wanted purses that would not be bulky or untidy in appearance, so reticules were designed. Reticules were made of fine fabrics like silk and velvet, carried with wrist straps. First becoming popular in France, they crossed over into Britain, where they became known as "indispensables". Men, however, did not adopt the trend. They used purses and pockets, which became popular in men's trousers.

The modern purse, clutch, pouch, or handbag came about in England during the Industrial Revolution, in part due to the increase in travel by railway. In 1841 the Doncaster industrialist and confectionery entrepreneur Samuel Parkinson (of butterscotch fame) ordered a set of traveling cases and trunks and insisted on a traveling case or bag for his wife's particulars after noticing that her purse was too small and made from a material that would not withstand the journey.

He stipulated that he wanted various handbags for his wife, varying in size for different occasions, and asked that they be made from the same leather that was being used for his cases and trunks to distinguish them from the then-familiar carpetbag and other travelers' cloth bags used by members of the popular classes. H. J. Cave (London) obliged and produced the first modern set of luxury handbags, as we would recognize them today, including a clutch and a tote (called a "ladies traveling case"). These are now on display in the Museum of Bags and Purses in Amsterdam.

H. J. Cave continued to sell and advertise the handbags, but many critics said that women did not need them and that bags of such size and heavy material would "break the backs of ladies". H. J. Cave ceased to promote the bags after 1865, concentrating on trunks instead, although they continued to make the odd handbag for royalty, celebrities, or to celebrate special occasions, the Queen's 2012 Diamond Jubilee being the most recent. H. J. Cave resumed handbag production in 2010.

== 20th century ==
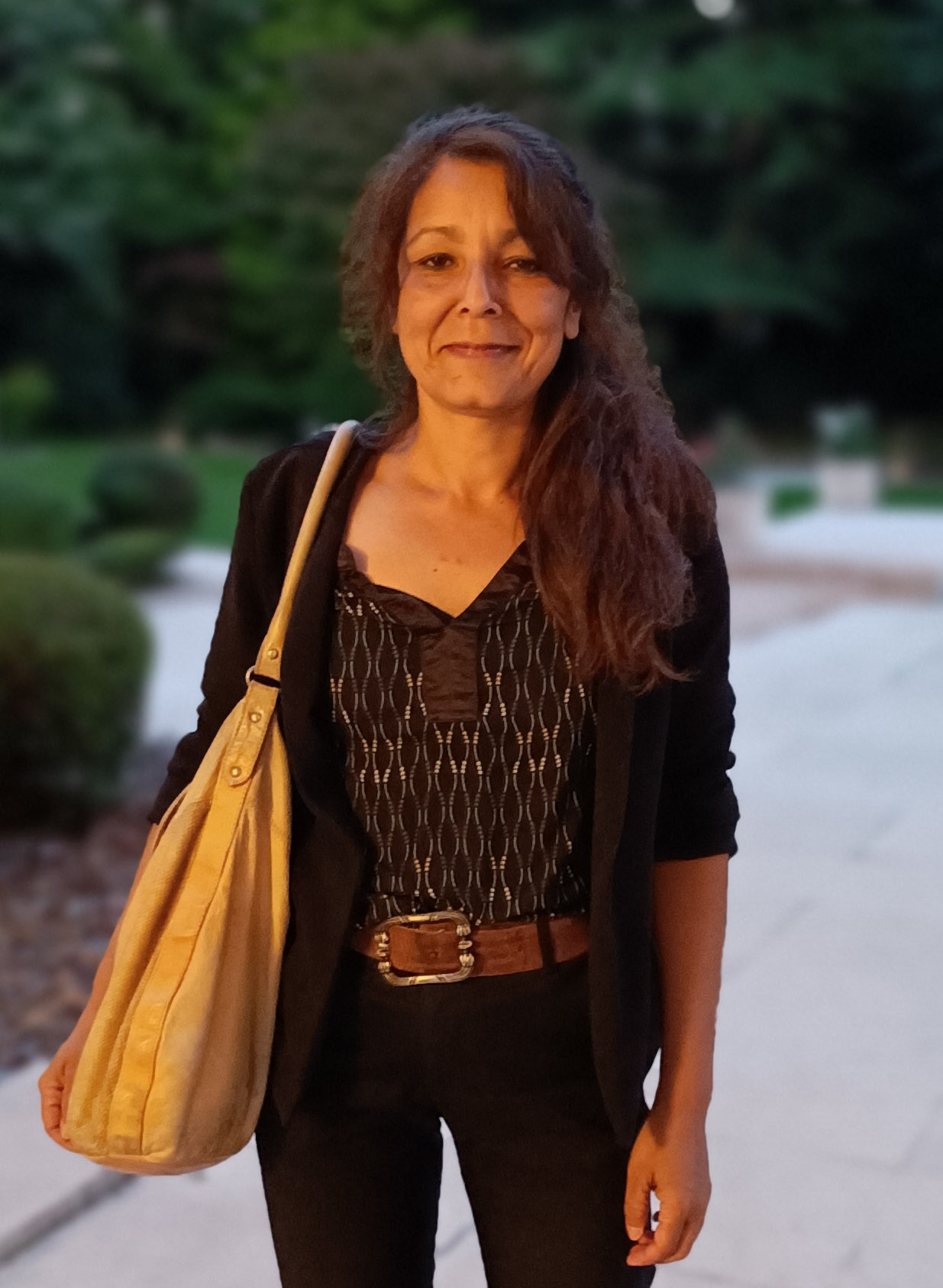
Handbag over the shoulder

When handbags started to become popular, they were criticized as unfeminine. In the early 20th century, Sigmund Freud argued that purses were sexually suggestive as the structure of the purse symbolized female genitalia and sexuality. Before handbags, pockets were secured inside of a woman's dress, which allowed items to be retrieved discreetly and modestly. Because handbags are carried in the open, the accessory exposed a woman's personal items. To Freud, a woman retrieving items from her purse was a representation of masturbation.

As handbags grew into the mainstream in the 20th century, they began to transform from purely practical items to symbols of the wearer's wealth and worth in society. The styles, materials, prices, and the brand names of purses and handbags became just as (if not more) valuable than the functionality of the bags themselves. Handbags transitioned from being seen as unfeminine, to being seen as specifically feminine and unmasculine. While women's bags served as fashion accessories meant to hold a few personal and beauty items, men's bags stayed more in the realm of briefcases: square, hard-edged, plain; containing items pertaining to the "man's world": such as business-related items, documents, files, and stationery. The gendered division between the personal bag and the business bag met in the middle with the unisex alms purse. Originating in the Middle Ages, the alms purse is meant to carry coins to donate to the church or the poor. The charitable symbolism of the alms purse later carried over to women's handbags in general; a woman carrying a bag was seen as upper class and therefore potentially using the bag to hold her donations.

During the 1940s, the rationing of textiles for World War II led to the manufacturing of handbags made in materials like raffia or crocheted from yarn. Some women crocheted their own small handbags from commercial patterns during this period.

== Men's bags ==
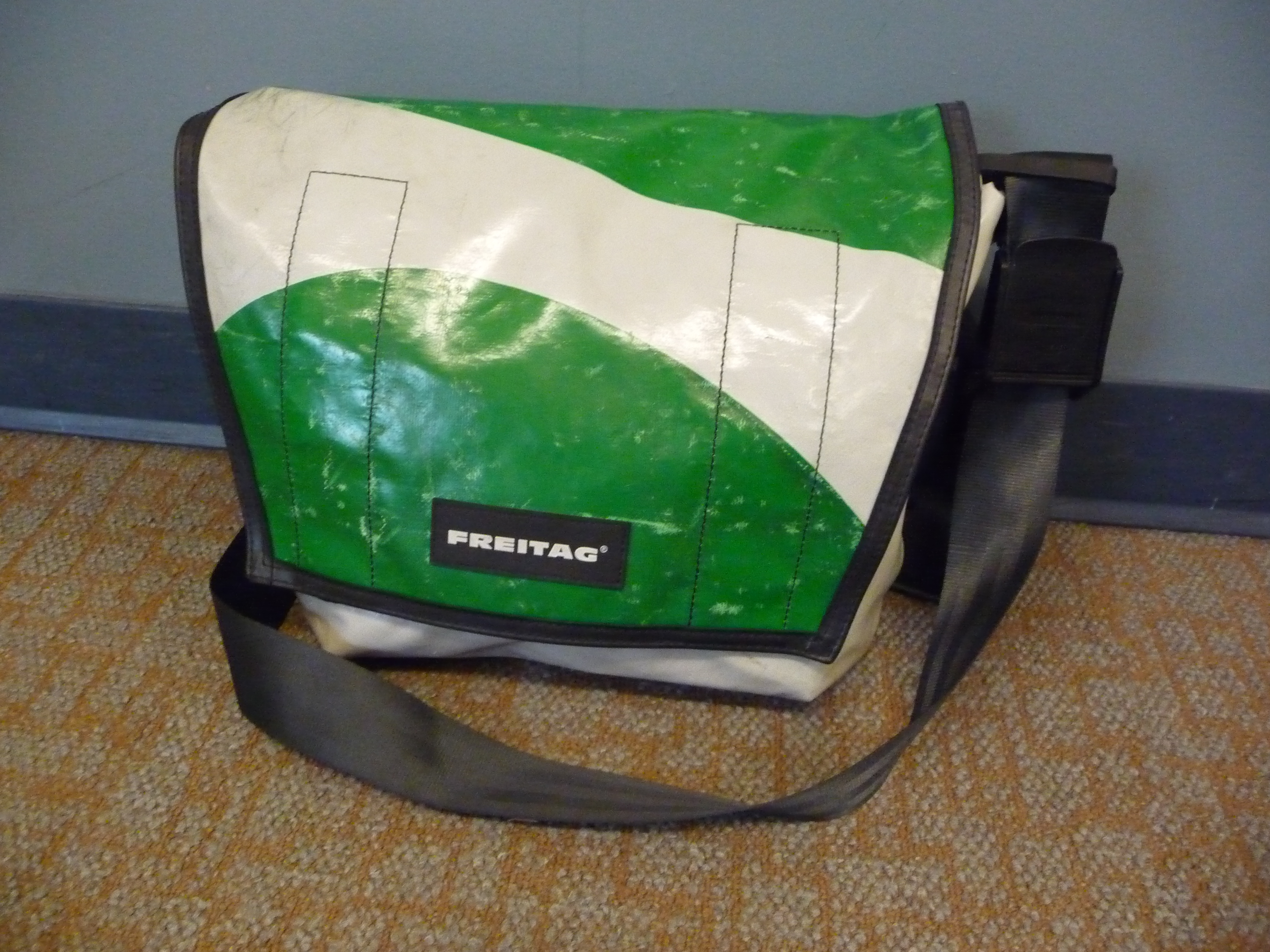
A casual messenger bag

The oldest known purse dates back more than 5000 years, and was a pouch worn by a man, Ötzi the Iceman. Men once carried coin purses. In early modern Europe, when women's fashions moved in the direction of using small ornamental purses, which evolved into handbags, men's fashions moved in another direction. Men's trousers replaced men's breeches during the course of the 18th and 19th centuries, and pockets were incorporated in the loose, heavy material. This enabled men to continue carrying coins, and then paper currency, in small leather wallets. Men's pockets were plentiful in the 19th century and 20th century trousers and coats, to carry possessions, such as pipes, matches, and knives, and they were an item frequently mended by their wives.

Men's purses were revived by designers in the 1970s in Europe. Since the 1990s, designers have marketed a more diverse range of accessory bags for men. The names man bag, man-purse, murse, and mini bag have been used to describe these bags. The designs common in the U.S. are typically variations on backpacks or messenger bags, and have either a masculine or a more unisex appearance, although they tend to be more streamlined than a backpack and less bulky than a briefcase. These bags are often called messenger bags or organizer bags. In many other countries, it is common for men to carry small rectangular shoulder bags, often made of leather. The leather satchel is also commonly used by men. Men's designer bags are produced by companies such as Prada, Louis Vuitton, Coach, and Bottega Veneta in a variety of shapes and sizes. As of 2011, the global men's bag and small leather goods trade was estimated at $4 billion per year. As of 2012, sales of men's accessories including "holdall" bags were increasing in North America.

== Types ==
Varieties of handbags (proportional)

- Baguette: a small, narrow, rectangular shape purse, resembling a French loaf of bread (baguette)
- Bowling bag: a popular 1990s "retro" style for younger women, modeled after American bags used to carry bowling balls; sturdy design with arched top and sides and a zipper closure with two carrying handles, may or may not have feet, usually no strap, no drawstring, no top flap
- Barrel bag: a cylindrical shape akin to a barrel, larger than a baguette bag, with two short handles, has no flap, and usually does not have shoulder straps.
- Bucket bag: a cylindrical bag, shaped like a bucket, medium-size or large, with one or two large handles, often shoulder strap(s), and a drawstring closure
- Clutch: a small firm handbag with a top flap and without handles, often rectangular in shape (soft versions sometimes are shaped like sections of an orange), often an evening bag but used during the day as well; some will feature a strap that can be worn over the shoulder but many will not
- Crossbody bag: a bag worn across the body from shoulder to hip; this is as opposed to a smaller hand carried bag such as a clutch as well as opposed to a larger bag such as a tote or bowling bag; a baguette, for example, may be worn crossbody, as can a half-moon or a messenger bag, but a tote cannot be worn this way nor can a hobo (some bucket bags are worn crossbody)
- Doctor's bag: also known as a Gladstone bag, modeled after a Victorian-era doctor's bag for making house calls, medium to large, has two sturdy handles but no straps and no top flap; resembles a bowling bag but may have a different closure, traditionally always in black leather
- East-west bag: a horizontally elongated handbag that is wider than it is tall
- Half-moon bag: shaped like a half-moon, usually smaller and feminine, worn hanging from the shoulder, may or may not have a handle
- Hobo bag: a soft-sided medium-sized crescent-shaped bag with a shoulder- or crossbody-length strap with no handle, no feet, and a top zipper closure with no top flap; a modern, casual silhouette
- Messenger bag: technically a variety of satchel (see below), square or rectangular (wider than tall) with one long strap worn across the body and large flap covering the top opening with no feet; inspired by bags worn by urban messengers to deliver business mail; meant to be carried against the lower back and usually made out of waterproof canvas rather than leather, with a secure front closure
- Minaudière: a variety of clutch, usually rigid-bodied with a hinge at the bottom, sometimes with a soft fabric lining, with no handles, straps, or feet, often encrusted with jewels and worn as evening wear
- Reticule: also known as a ridicule or indispensable, is an obscure type of small drawstring handbag or purse, similar to a modern evening bag, used mainly from 1795 to 1820
- Saddlebag: a small to medium size bag shaped like an equestrian saddle bag, always with a top flap and curved sides and bottom along with a shoulder strap but no top handle(s), no drawstring, and no feet. The Dior Saddle bag, introduced in 1999 by designer John Galliano, is a well-known contemporary example of this style
- Satchel: a larger soft-sided case usually of leather, often with a pair of top handles and a shoulder strap, usually has a front flap, similar to a doctor's bag or tote in shape but smaller, worn across the body and resting on the opposite hip; a satchel made of canvas is usually considered a messenger bag
- Shoulder bag: a bag worn hanging off the shoulder, as opposed to a crossbody bag or a handheld bag; has a shorter strap than a crossbody, but otherwise is not usually distinguished; both shoulder bags and crossbody bags are larger than most clutches or wristlets, but smaller than totes or bucket bags; they may have a top flap, a handle, and feet, or none of these; a hobo bag is a variety of shoulder bag, but because of its distinct shape, it is usually referred to as a hobo specifically
- Top handle bag: a medium-sized bag with one or two top handles, may or may not have a flap, often rectangular with four feet, may also have a strap; many satchels are also top-handle bags, and some of these may be worn as crossbody bags or as shoulder bags if they also have a strap
- Tote: a medium to large bag with two longer straps and an open top (no flap, no zipper closure), similar to a bucket bag but usually less cylindrical and more square, with no feet; the Hermes Birkin bag is an example
- Wristlet: a small rectangular handbag with a short carrying strap resembling a bracelet that can be worn around the wrist. Similar to a clutch in design, but with the added wrist strap

== Hardware ==
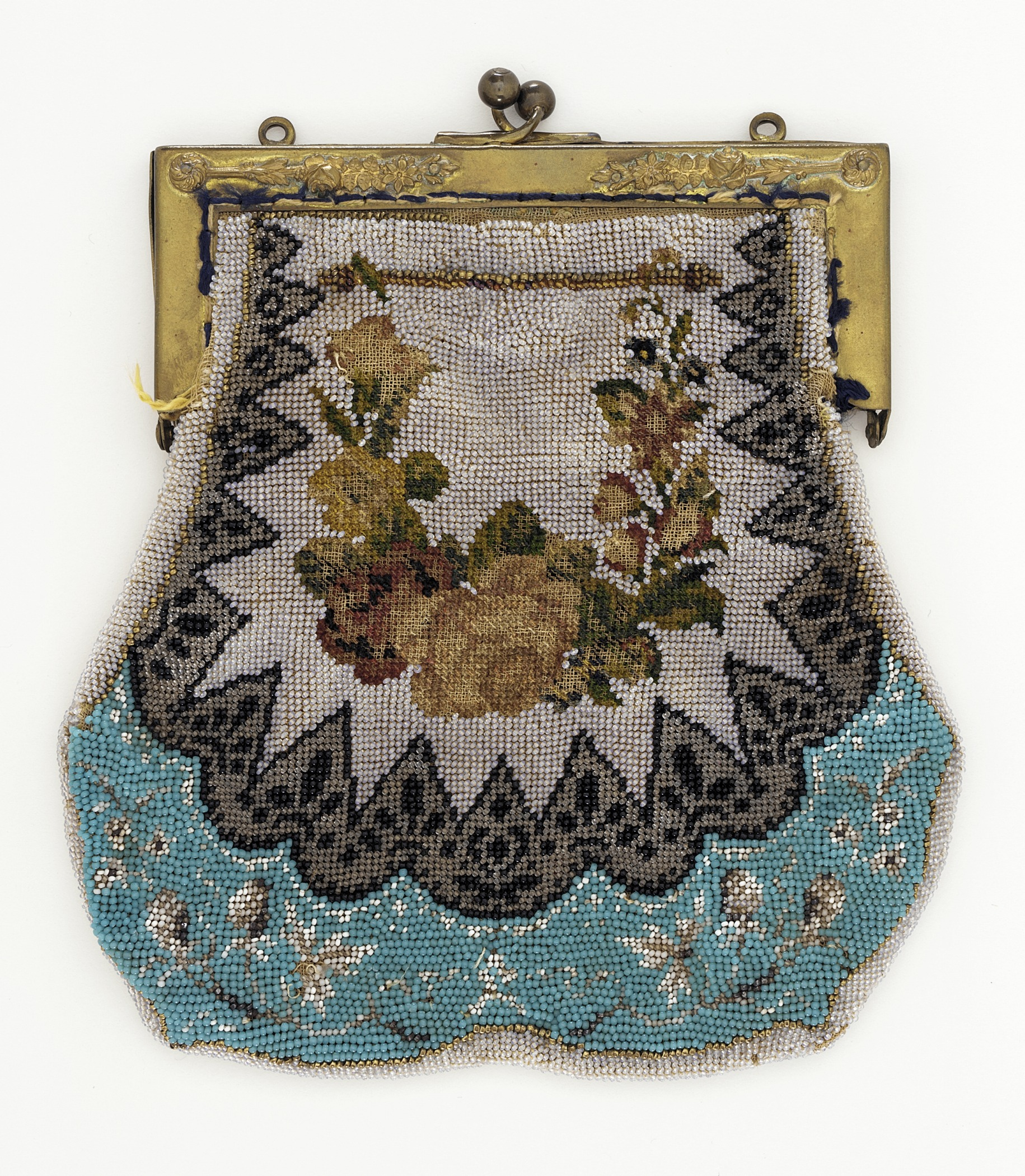
1860 Woman's handbag with frame and kissing lock (LACMA)

A distinction can also be made between soft-body handbags or frame handbags, where a metal frame supports the textile or leather of the bag. Frame bags often use a kissing lock closure, with two interlocking metal beads set on the top of the frame. Kissing locks were popular on handbags during the early- to mid-20th century, and remain popular with vintage collectors and in "retro" designs. These locks are still seen on smaller coin purses.

== Coinage as a verb ==
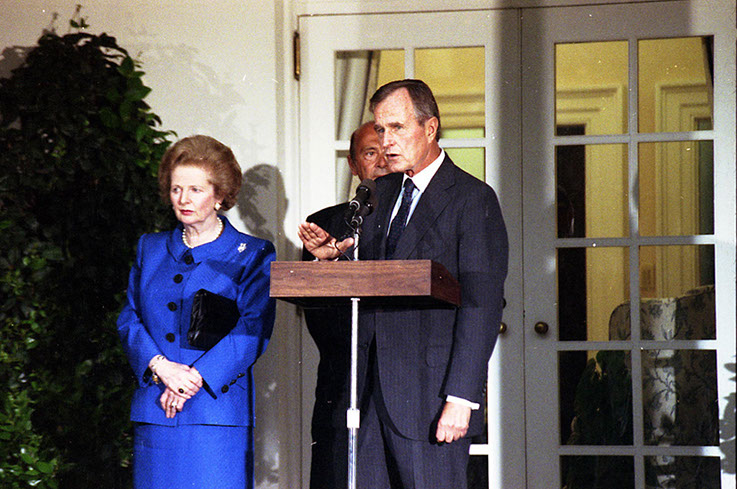
President George H. W. Bush, Prime Minister Margaret Thatcher, and NATO Secretary General Manfred Woerner make statements to the press regarding Iraq's invasion of Kuwait; Thatcher holds her famous handbag

The verb "to handbag" and its humorous usage was inspired in the 1980s by UK prime minister Margaret Thatcher having "weaponized" the handbag in the opinion of British biographer and historian David Cannadine. As "her most visible symbol of her power to command" the bag became an emphatic prop that she produced at meetings to show she meant business. She would invariably bring out of the bag a crucial document from which she would quote, her speech notes often being cut to size to fit inside. Because Thatcher was Britain's first female prime minister, former Daily Telegraph editor Charles Moore wrote in his authorised biography of 2013, "her handbag became the sceptre of her rule".

The verb's more general meaning of "treating ruthlessly" came to symbolize Thatcher's whole style of government. Victims of her handbaggings, from political leaders to journalists, have testified to what the German chancellor Helmut Kohl perceived as her "ice-cold pursuit of her interests". US secretary of state James Baker recalled her standby ploy: "When negotiations stall, get out the handbag! The solution is always there."

Julian Critchley, one of her biggest Tory backbench critics, once said, "Margaret Thatcher and her handbag is the same as Winston Churchill and his cigar." Thatcher's bag was almost as newsworthy an item as she was herself and on the day she died, one of her handbag-makers saw a sharp rise in sales of her favorite structured design. The original bag Thatcher asserts on a signed card was the one "used every day in my time at Downing Street" is archived at Churchill College, Cambridge. Made of dark blue leather "in mock-croc style", it was a gift from friends on her birthday in 1984.

== Handbag collecting ==
In 2014, the auction house Christie's started a handbag department. In June 2017, Christie's had its first sale devoted exclusively to handbags.

According to The Daily Telegraph, the most sought-after and valuable brand is Hermès, followed by brands such as Céline, Chanel, and Louis Vuitton.

=== World records ===
In June 2015, a Christie's handbag sale in Hong Kong saw a pink crocodile skin Hermès Birkin bag made only in 2014, sell for a then world record £146,000.

In May 2017, Christie's Hong Kong sold a white crocodile skin Hermès Birkin bag with 10.23 carats of diamonds for a world record HK$2.9 million (£293,000).

=== Museums ===
The Museum of Bags and Purses is in Amsterdam, the Netherlands; the Simone Handbag Museum is in Seoul, South Korea; the ESSE Purse Museum is in Little Rock, Arkansas; the German Leather Museum is in Offenbach am Main, Germany; and the Victoria and Albert Museum (V&A) is in London, the UK.

=== Notable collectors ===
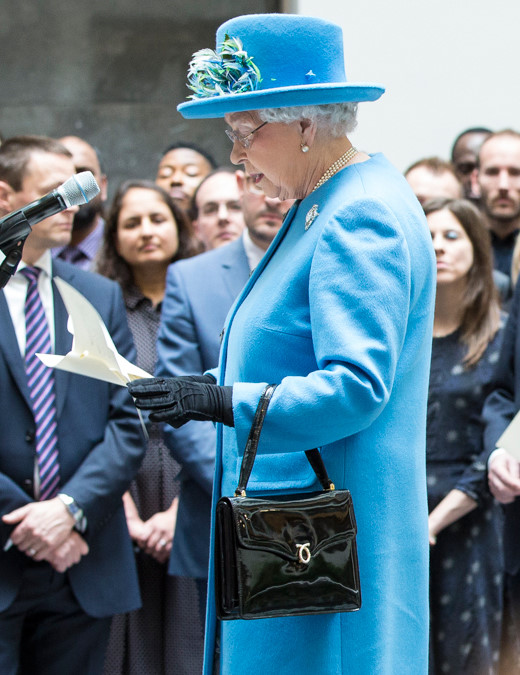
Queen Elizabeth II with a Launer London bag in 2015

Queen Elizabeth II owned over 200 Launer London bags, and kept all of her mother's Launer bags.

The largest privately owned purse collection is owned by Ilene Hochberg Wood, totaling over 3000 handbags with the most expensive valued at $110,000. She keeps most of her collection in a secure bunker but a portion of her collection has traveled to five museums as exhibitions, including to Bethlehem, Pa at the Kemerer Museum of Decorative Arts, Moravian Museum of Bethlehem, America on Wheels Museum in Allentown, PA, the Coral Gables Museum in Coral Gables, FL, and the Fort Wayne Museum of Art, in Fort Wayne, IN.

Other notable collectors include Victoria Beckham, who has more than 100 Birkin bags, Katie Holmes, Rita Ora and Kelly Brook. Cara Delevingne, Miranda Kerr, Lauren Conrad, Rosie Huntington-Whiteley, Beyoncé, Mary-Kate Olsen, Ashley Olsen, Lady Gaga, Olivia Palermo, and Rihanna are also collectors. Others include Kim Chiu, KC Concepcion, Kris Aquino, Heart Evangelista, Marian Rivera, Bea Alonzo, Kathryn Bernardo, Lovi Poe, Megan Young, Gretchen Barretto, Camille Prats, Sarah Lahbati, and Jeffree Star.

== Gallery ==
=== Popular silhouettes ===
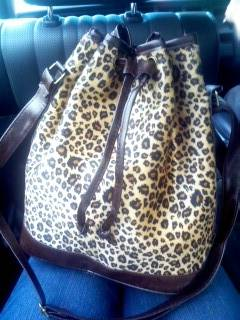
Bucket bag with drawstring closure

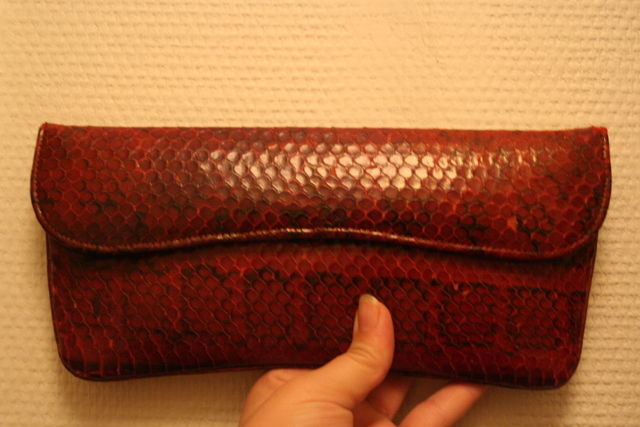
Clutch with fold-over closure, made of red snakeskin

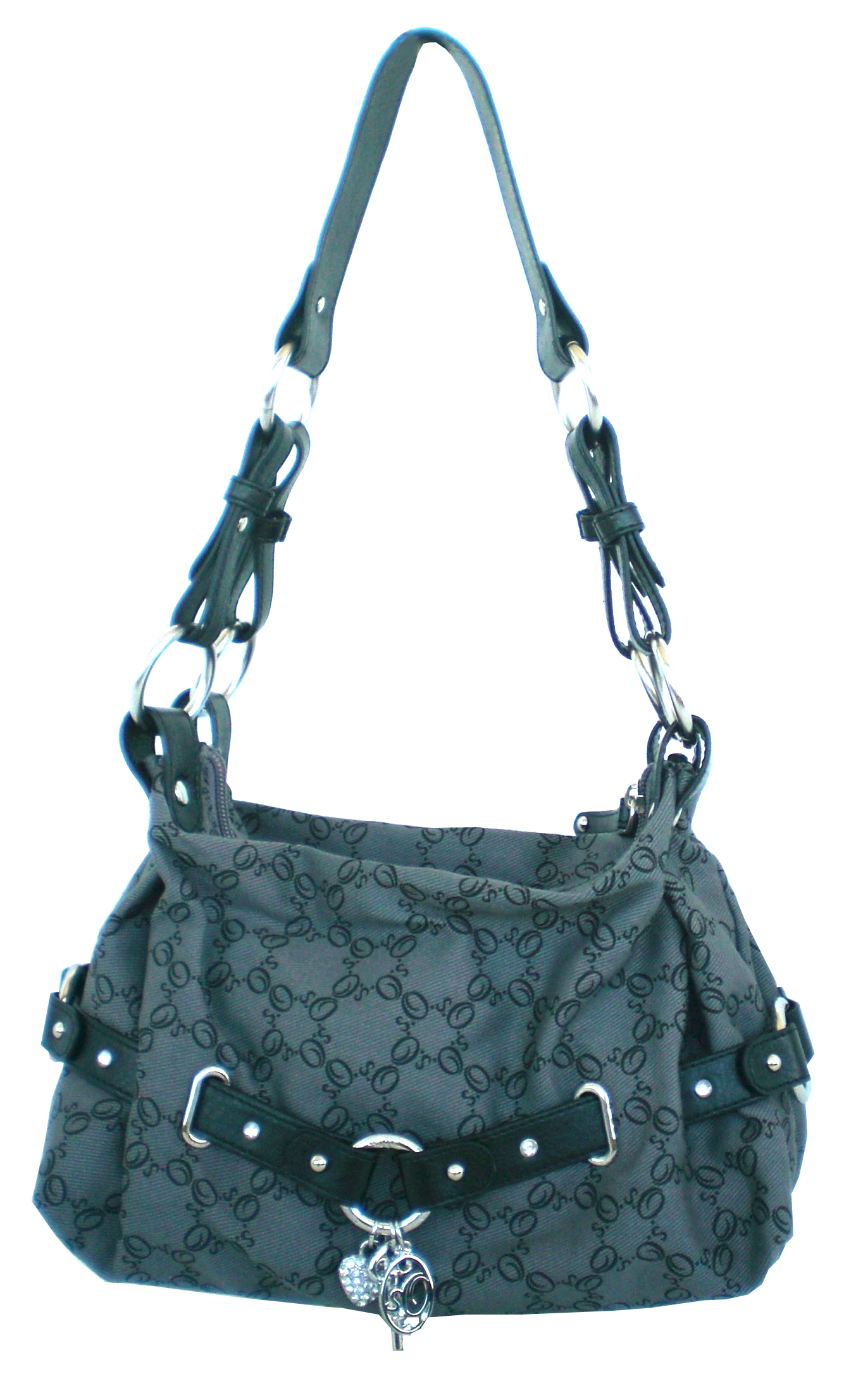
Hobo bag with top zipper, shoulder strap, and characteristic slouch in the middle

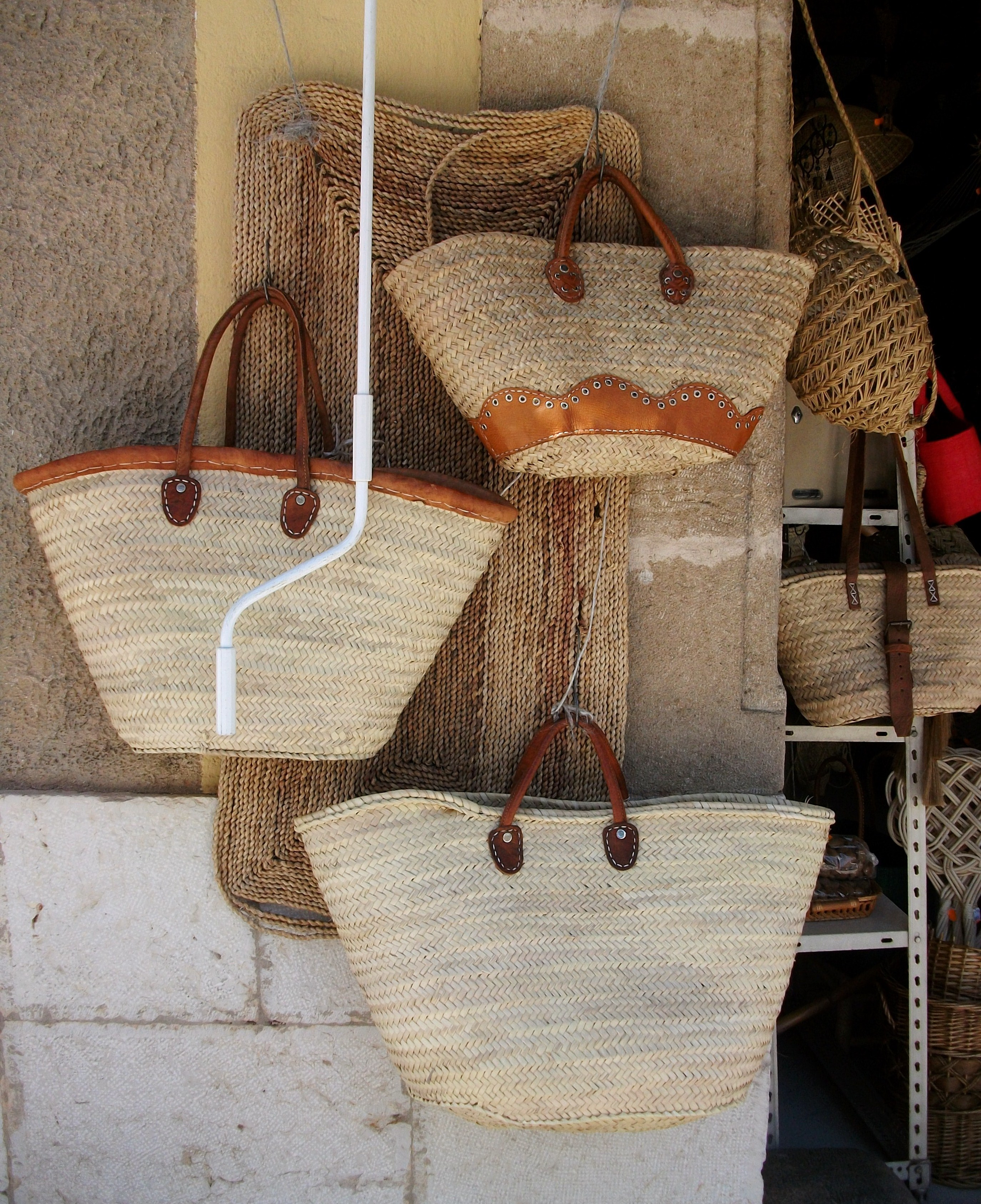
Collection of kiondo style handbags

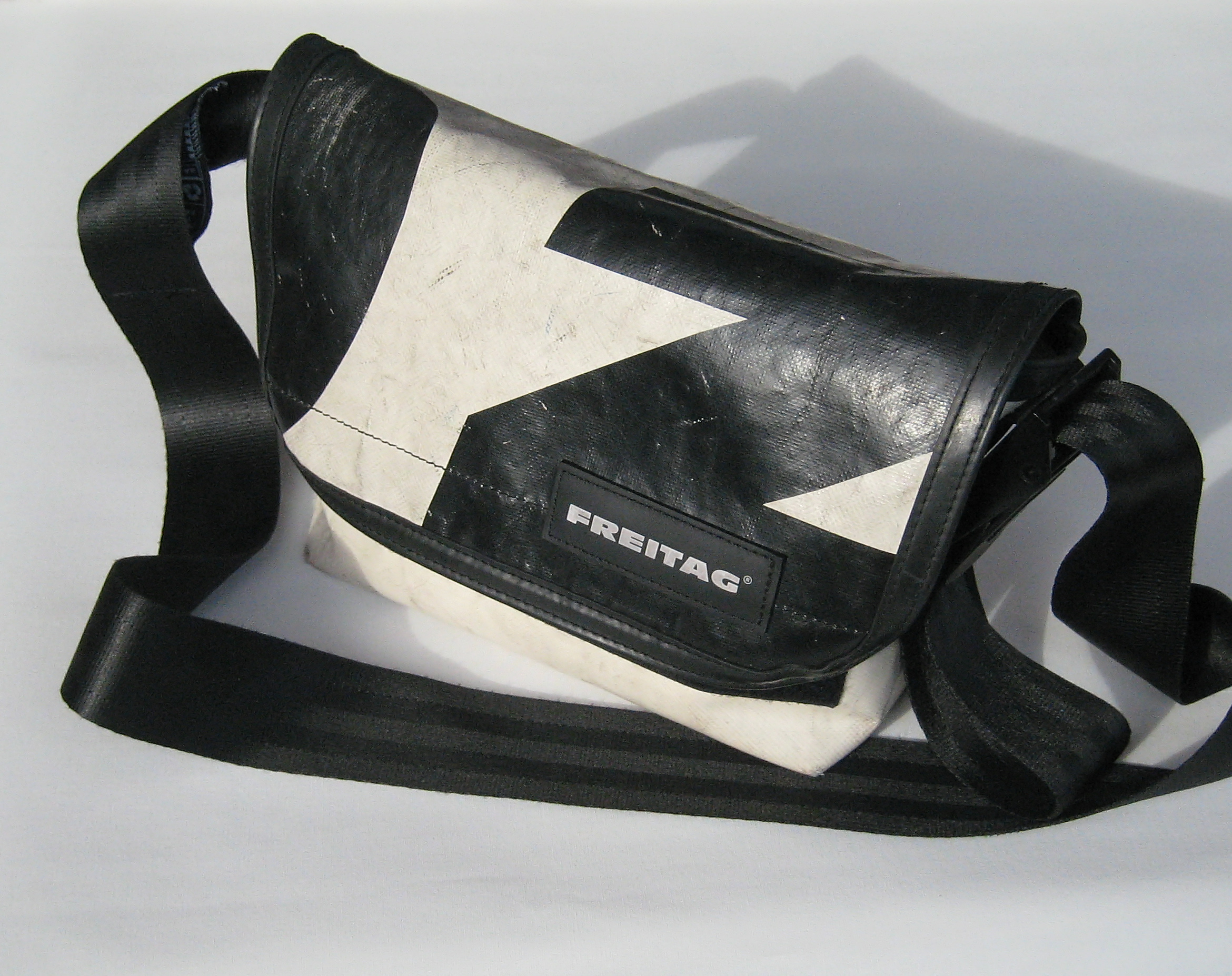
Messenger bag from old truck tarp with seat belt as strap, made by Freitag, Switzerland (2008)

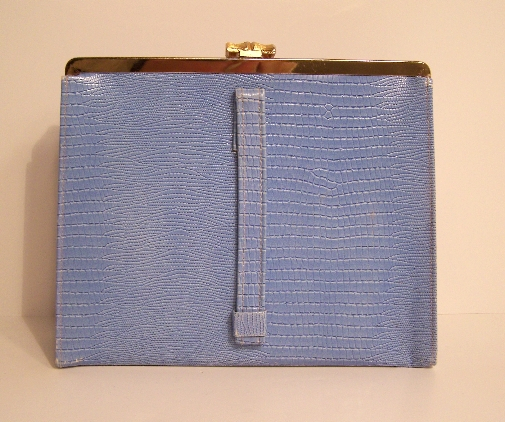
Vintage pocketbook

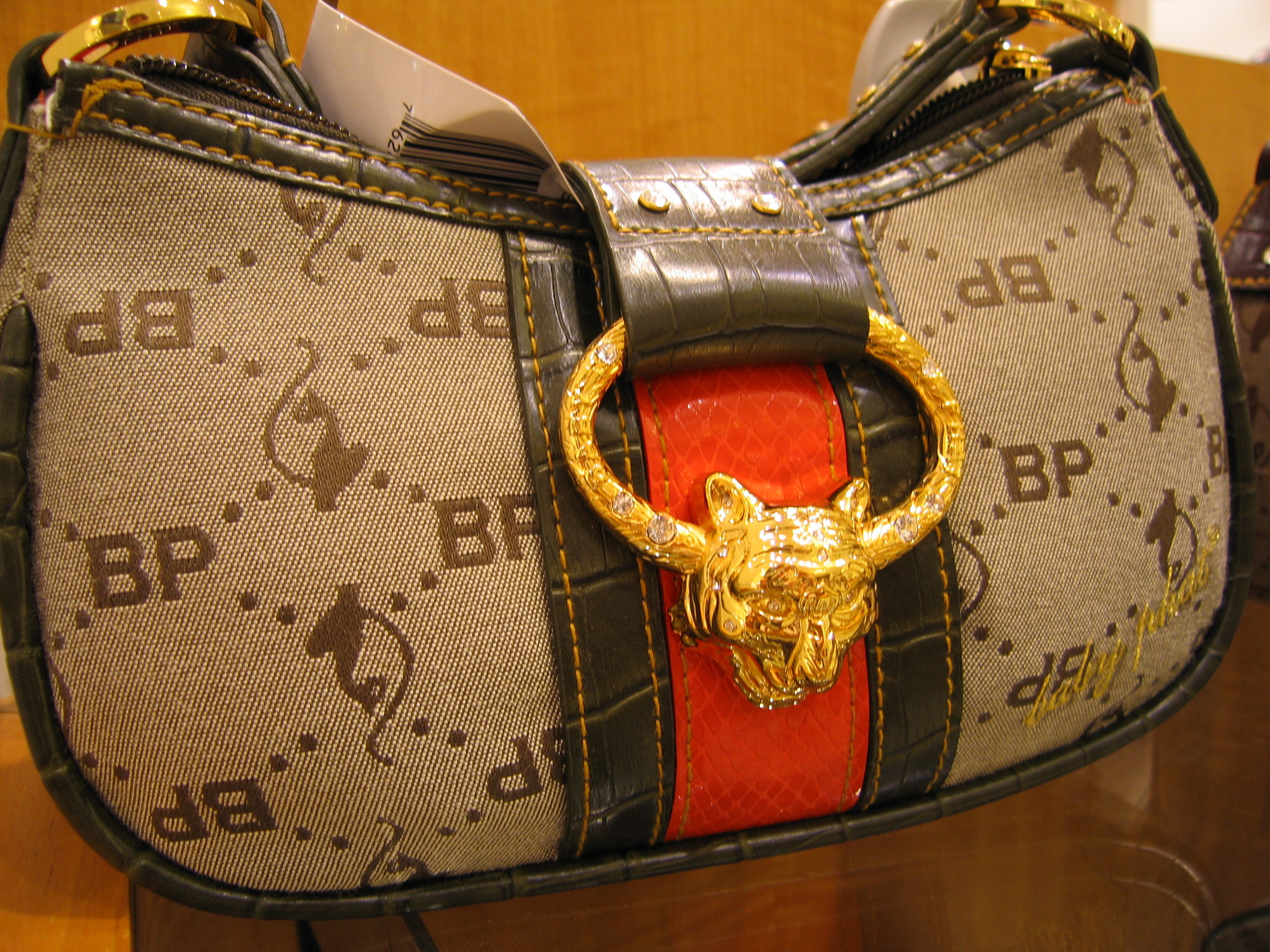
Saddle shape, with equestrian hardware detail

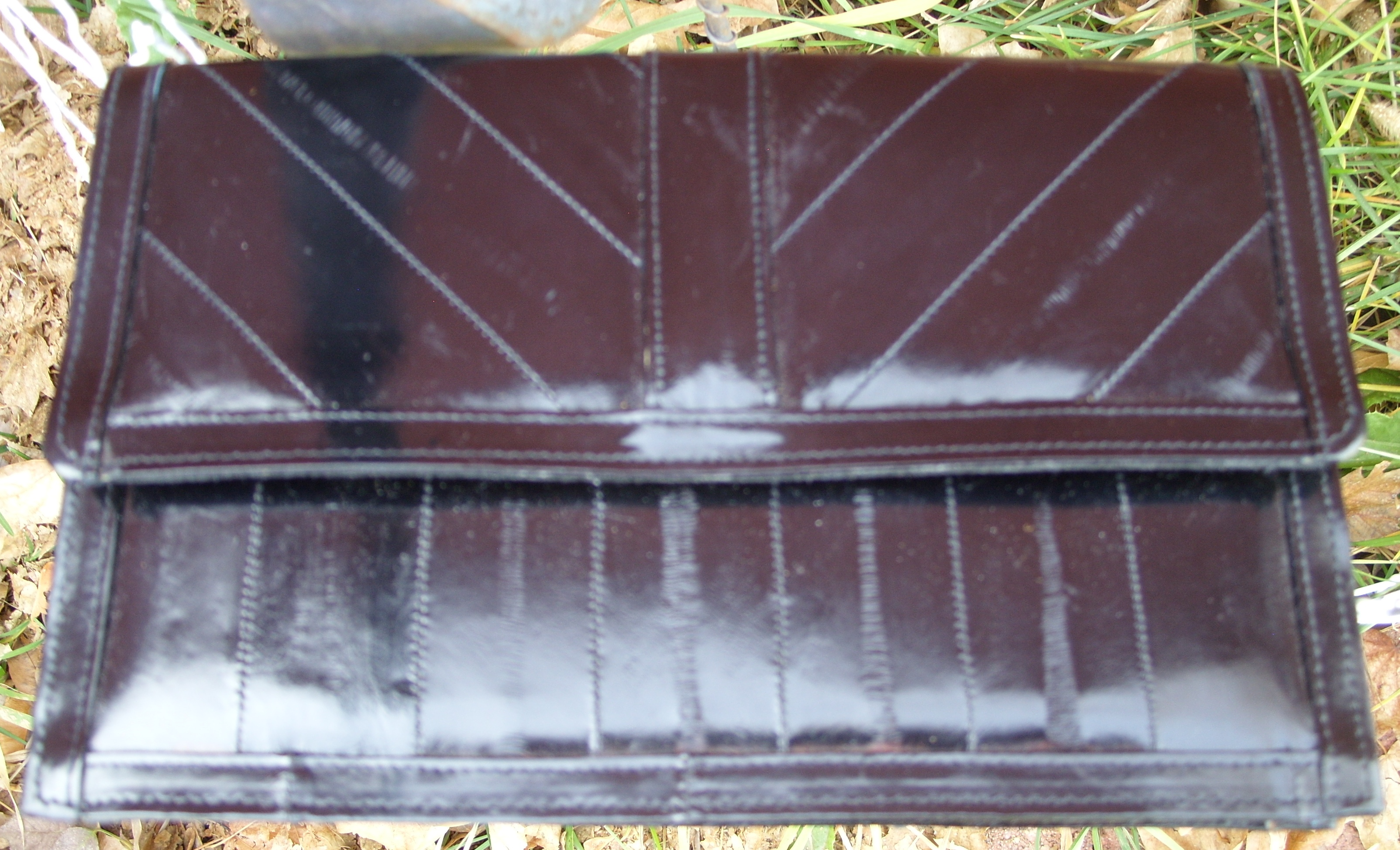
Clutch made from eel skin

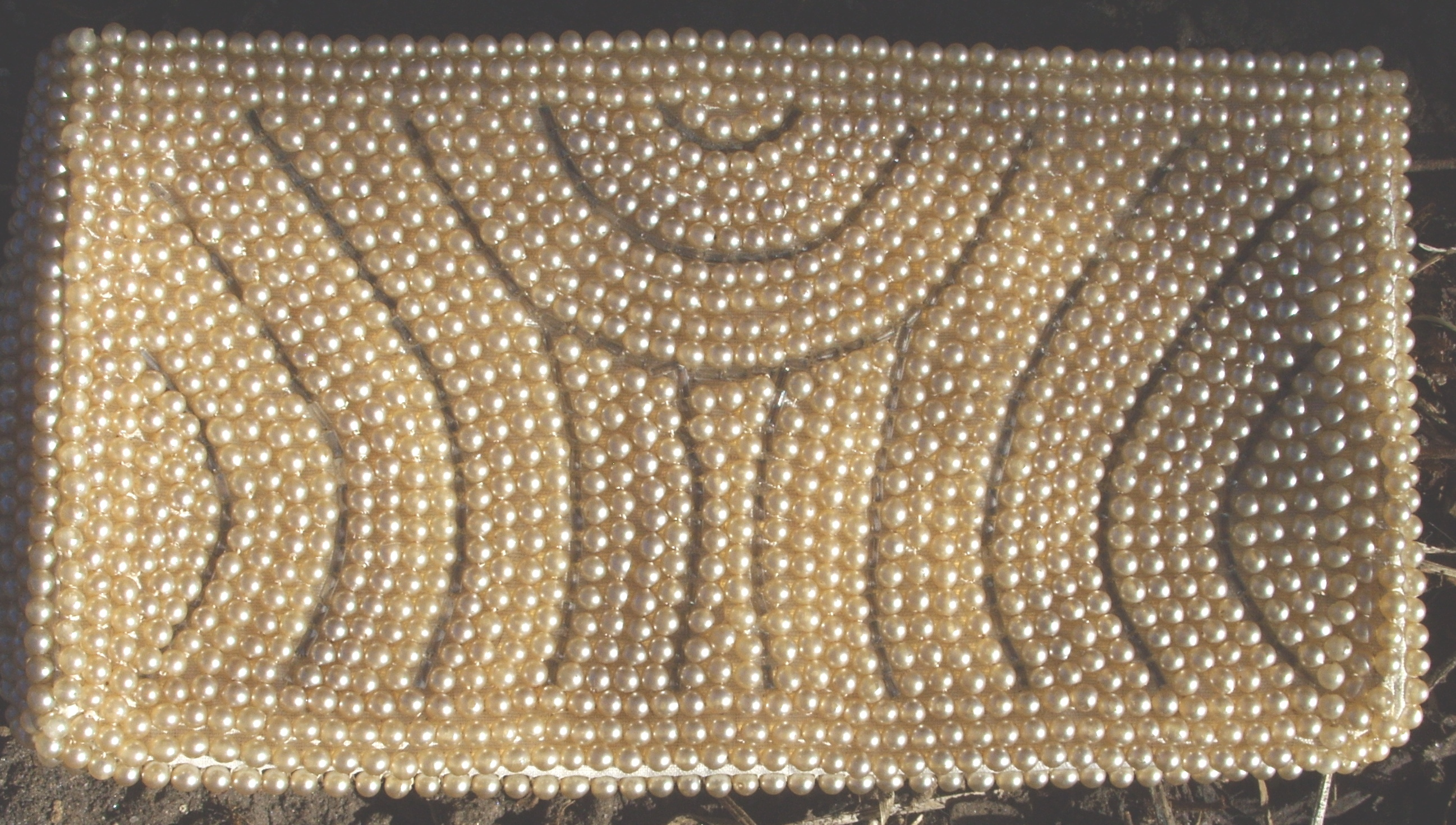
Vintage evening minaudière, made of ivory satin encrusted with faux pearls and glass bugle beads

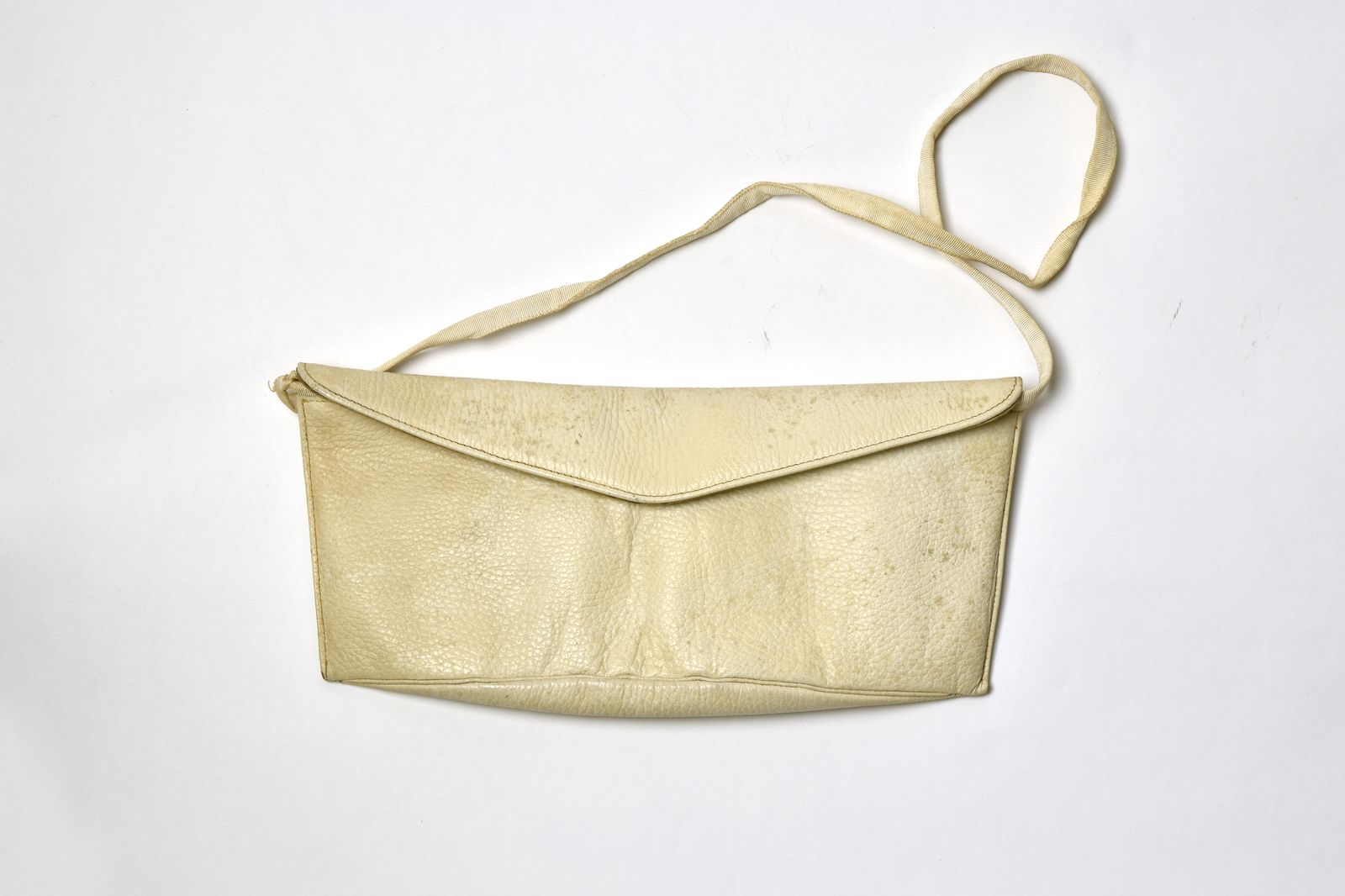
White leather baguette bag

=== Traditional types ===
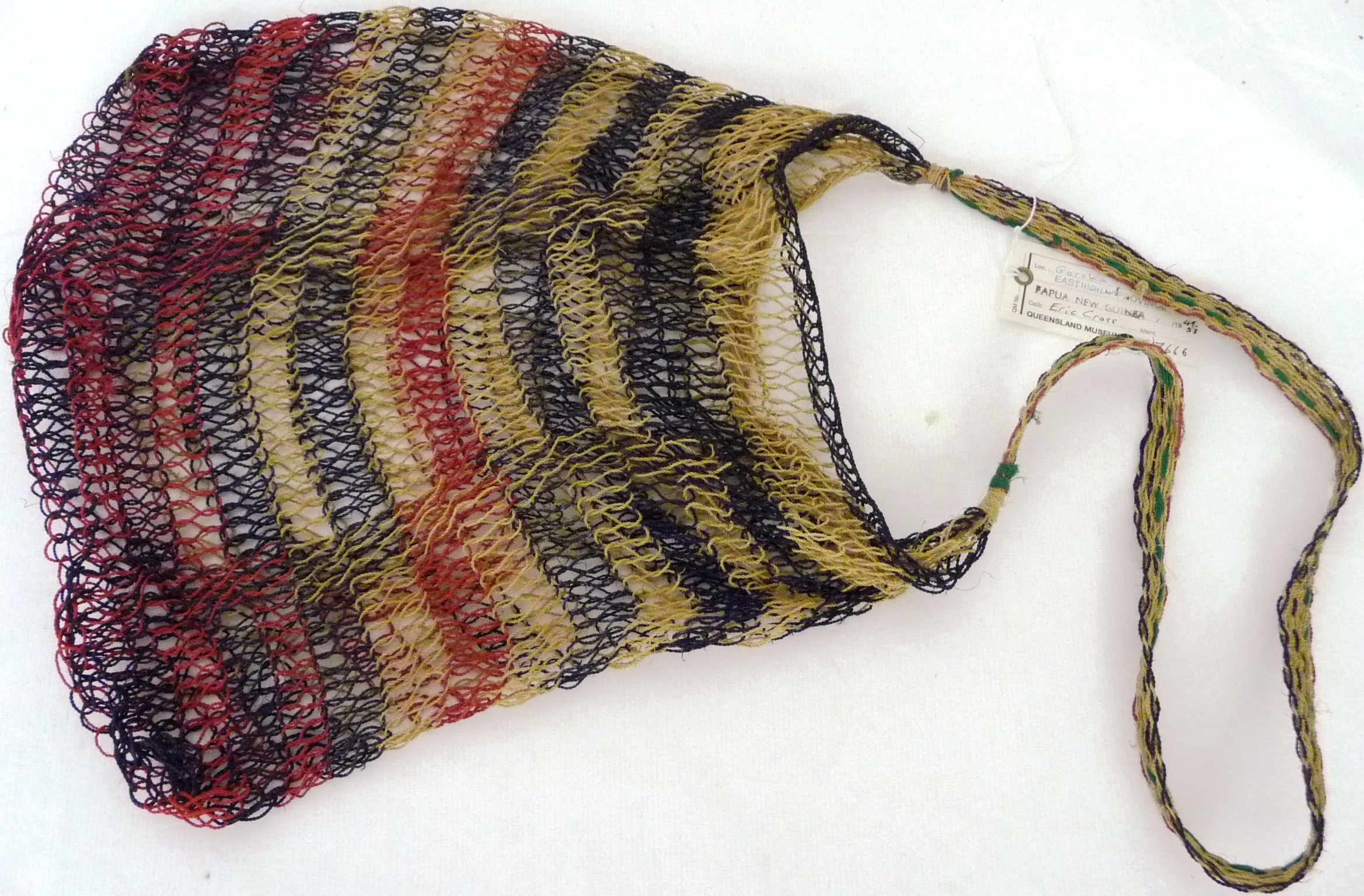
A bilum bag, used in Papua New Guinea. Bilums are made of "bush rope", cuscus fur or wool, and expand in size.

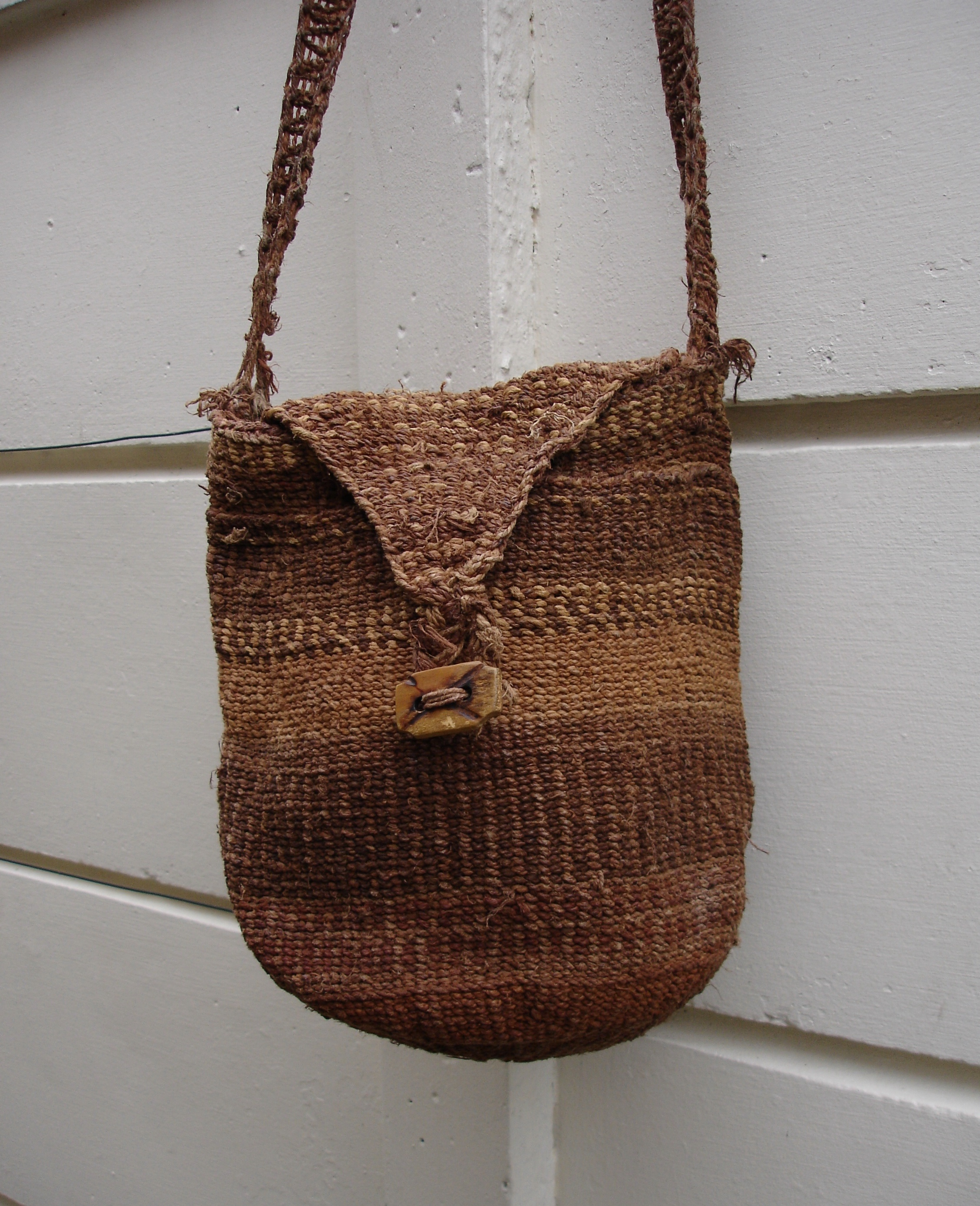
A shoulder bag made of baobab tree fibres, Zimbabwe, 1995

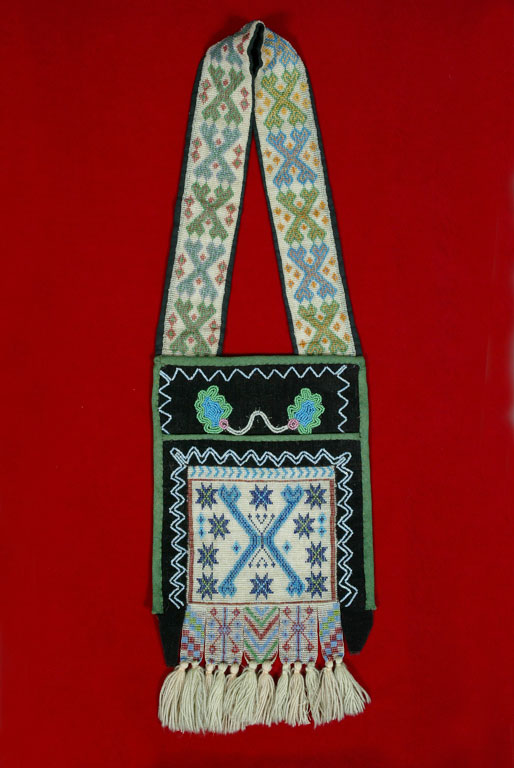
Ojibwa bag with decorative beadwork; this particular bag was probably made for a child

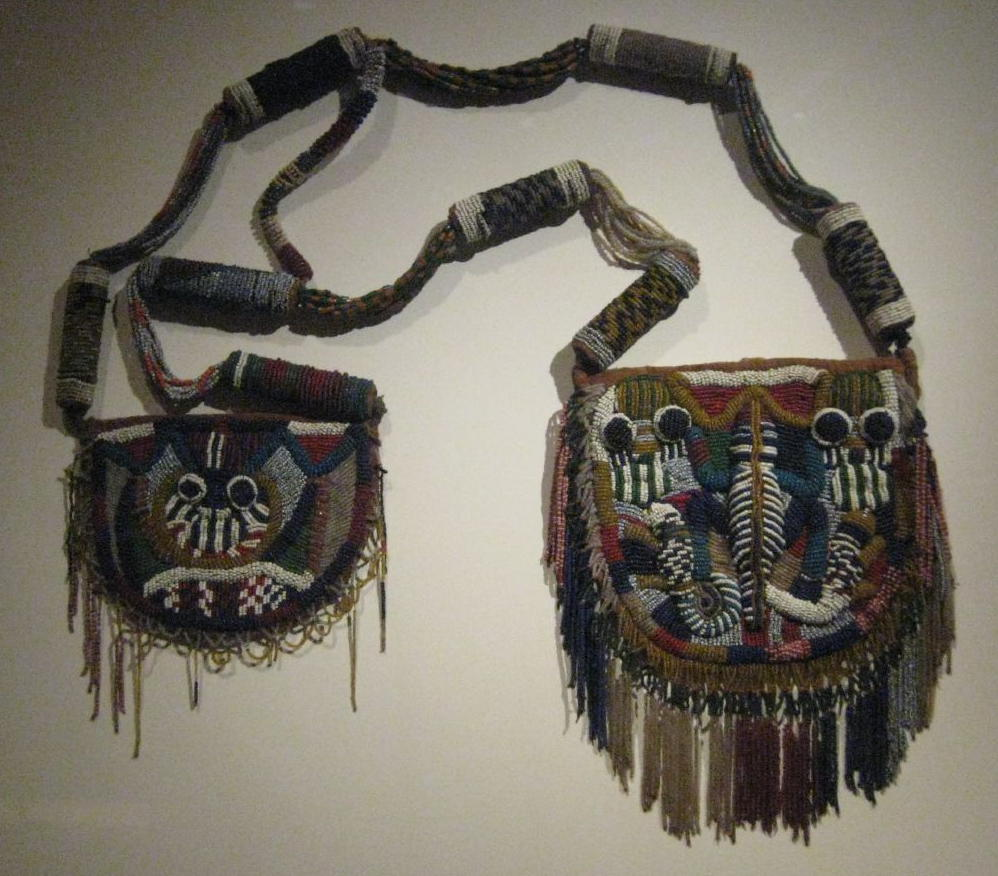
Early 20th century Yoruba Diviner's bag, from the Oyo region, Nigeria

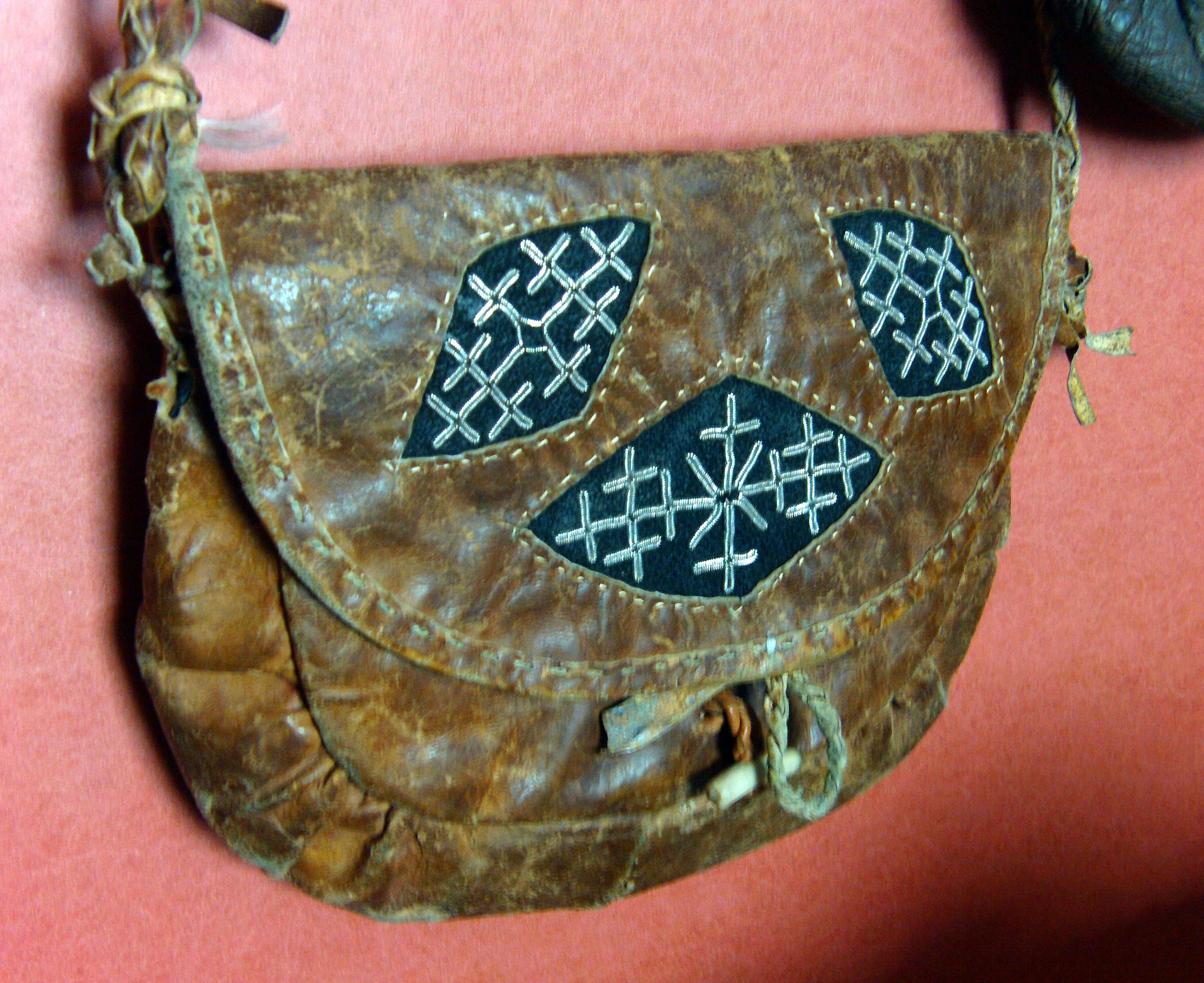
A Scandinavian Sámi purse (handbag) with shoulder strap

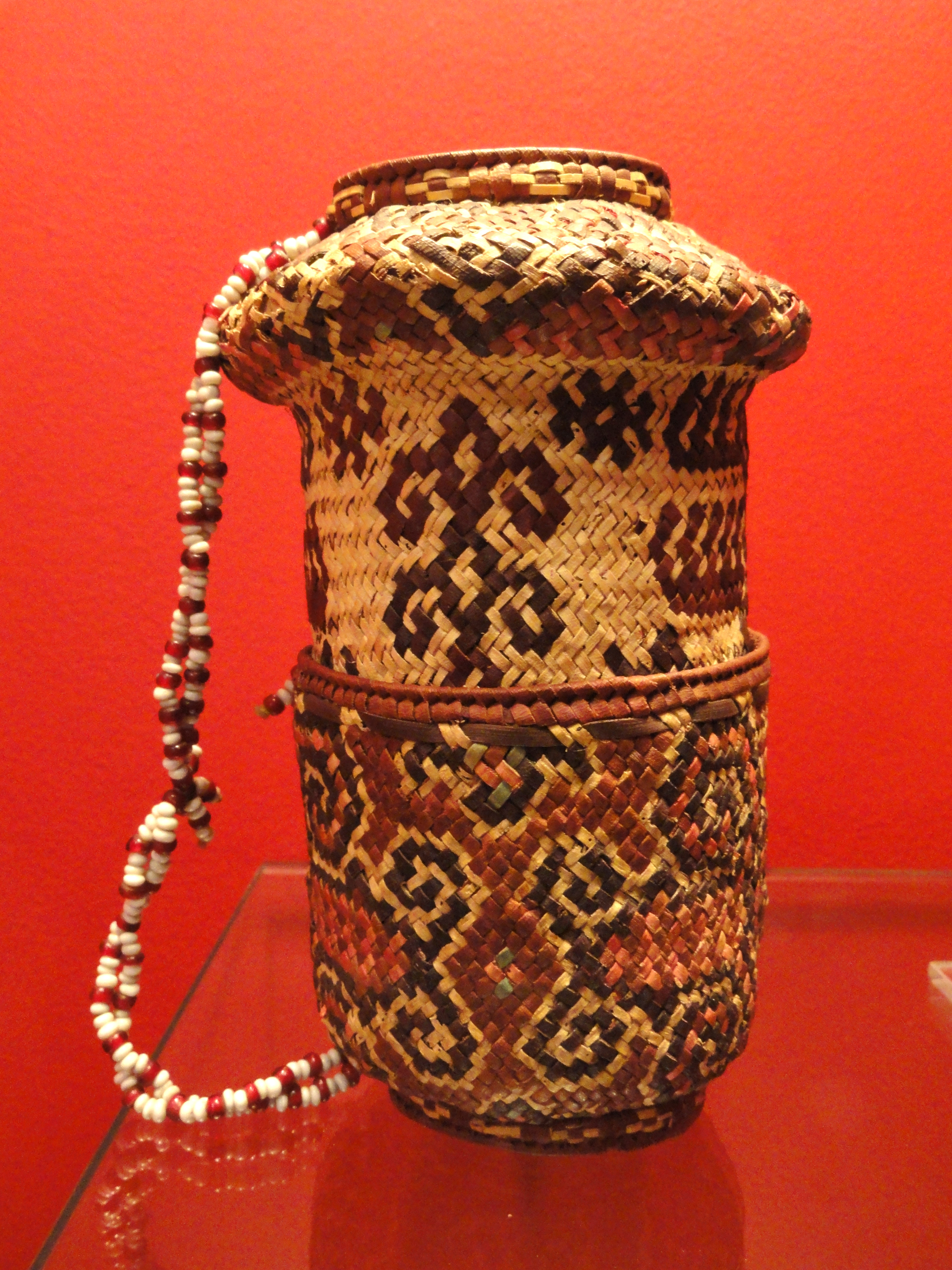
A Betel bag from West Timor, made around 1921. Called an aluk, such bags are still made.

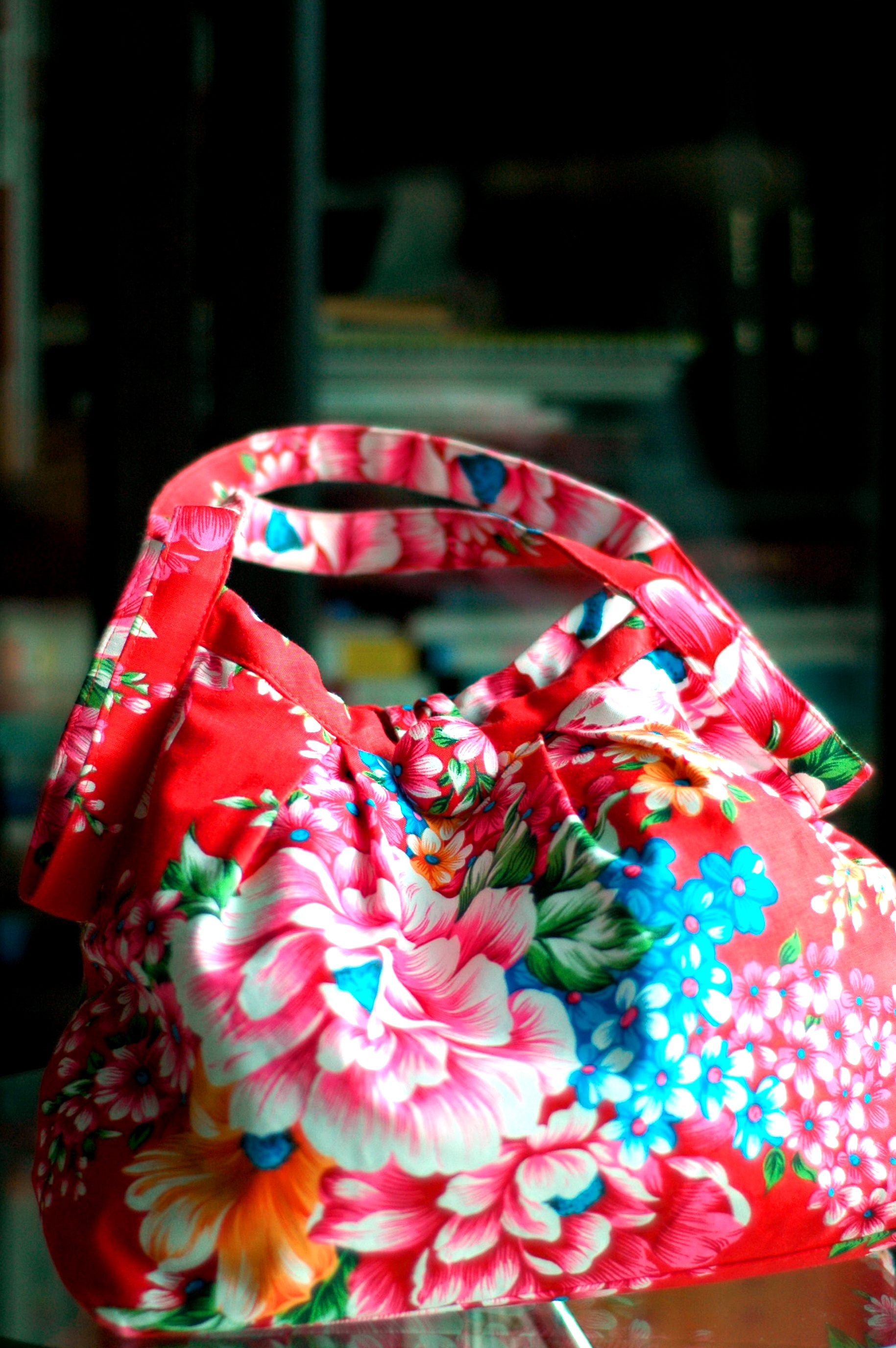
A modern handbag in a traditional Hakka Chinese-style floral fabric design

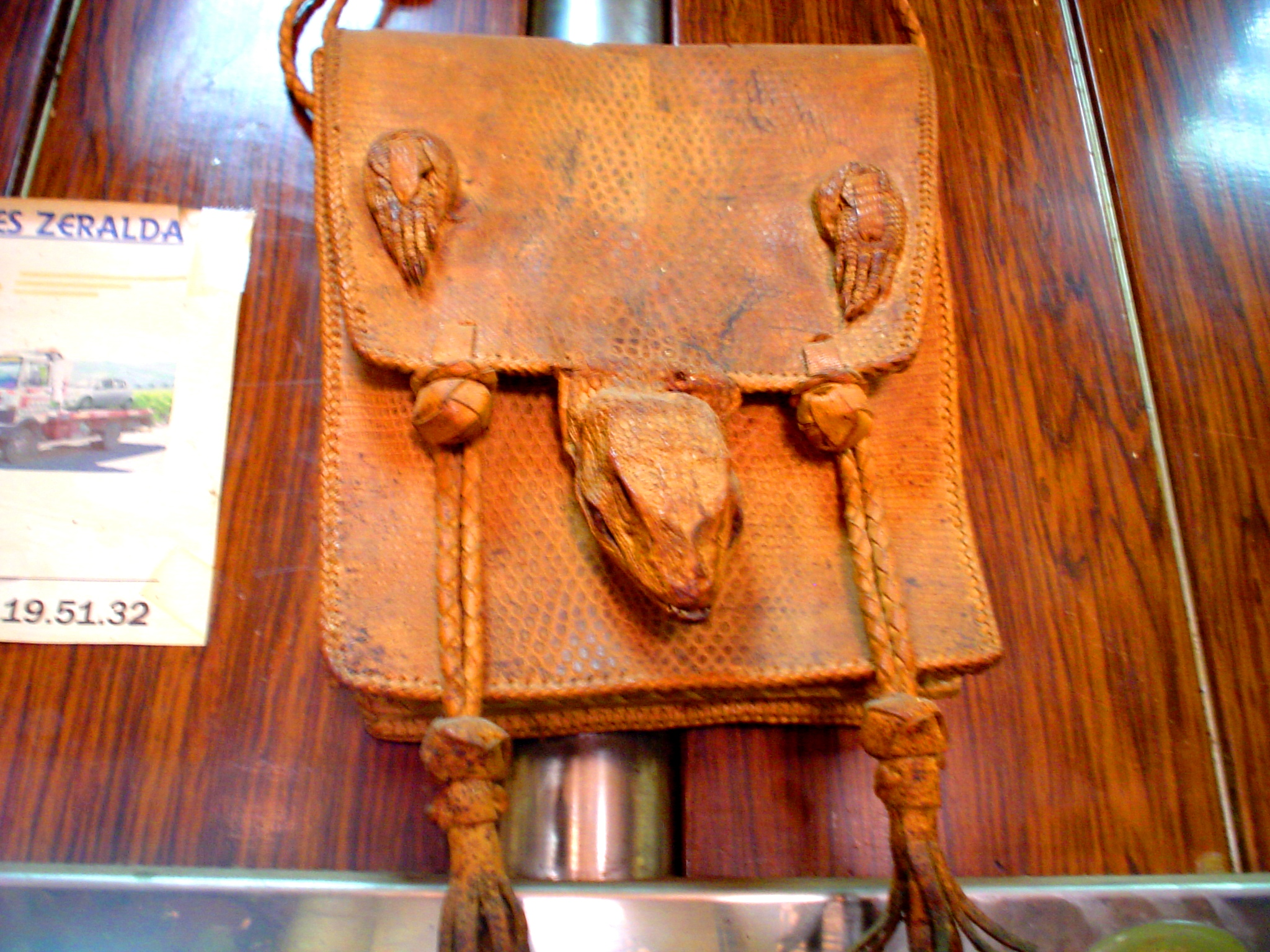
North African bag with lizard head and paws

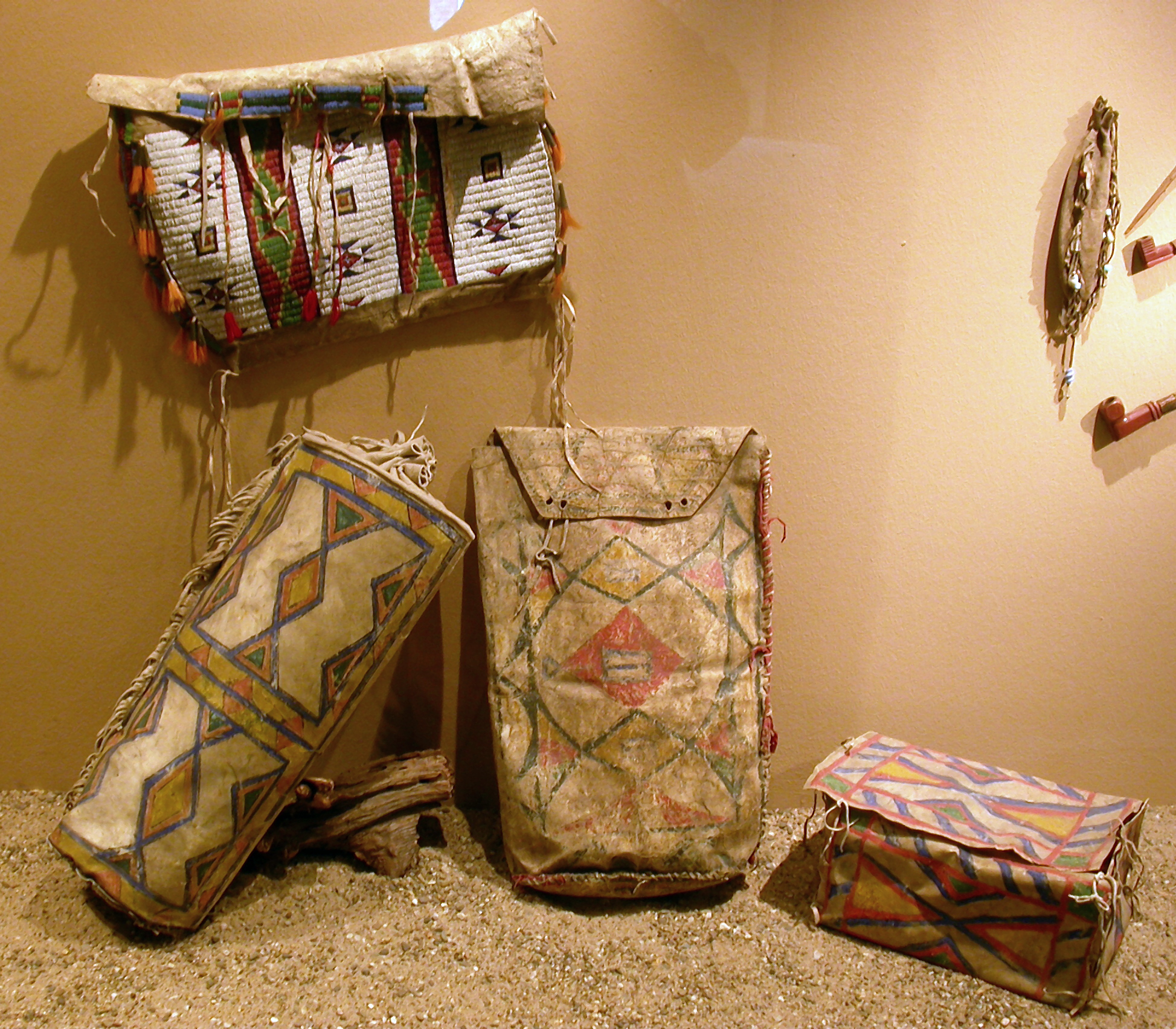
19th century bags and pouches of the Sioux

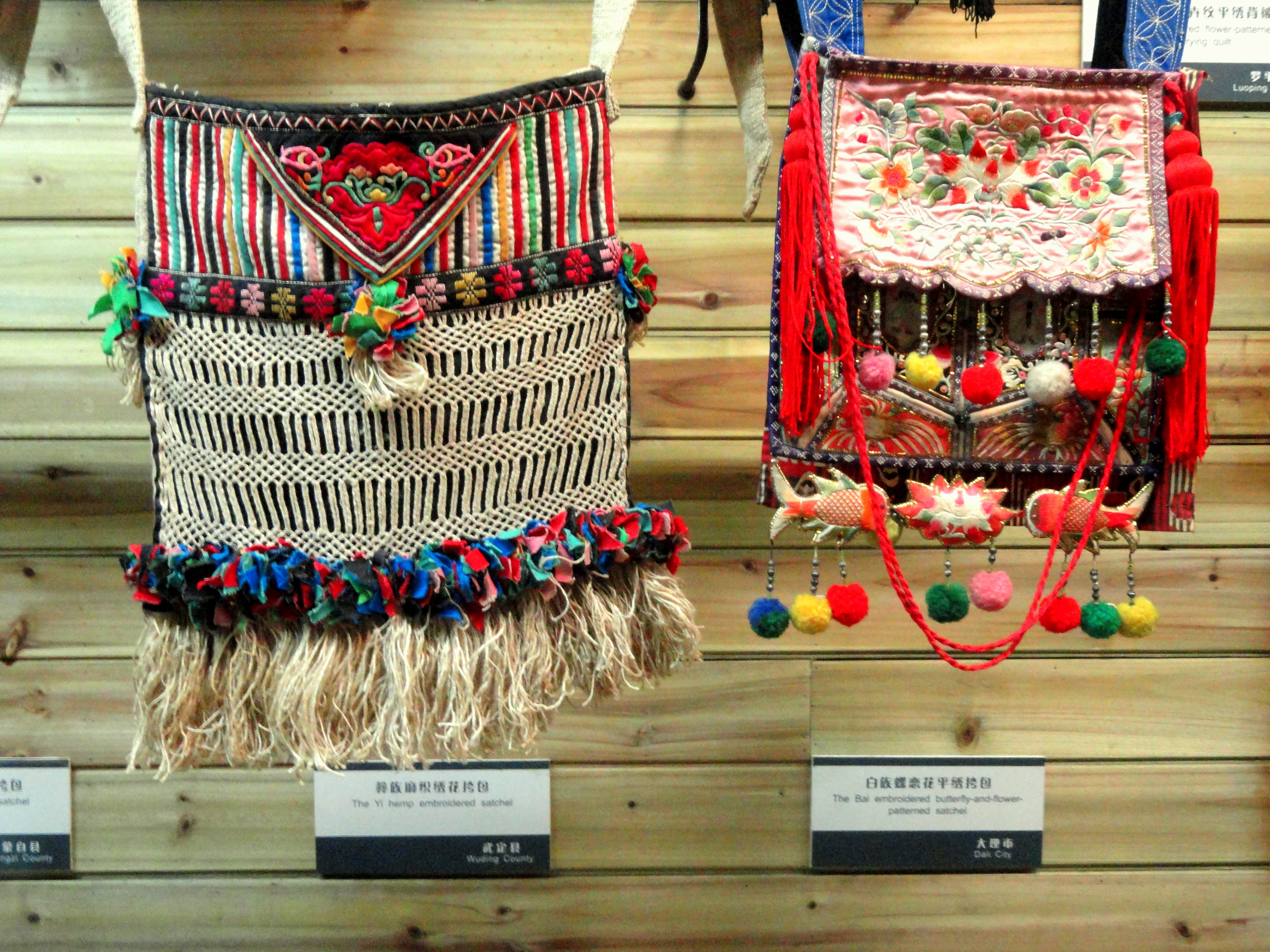
Bags exhibited in the Yunnan Nationalities Museum, Kunming, Yunnan, China

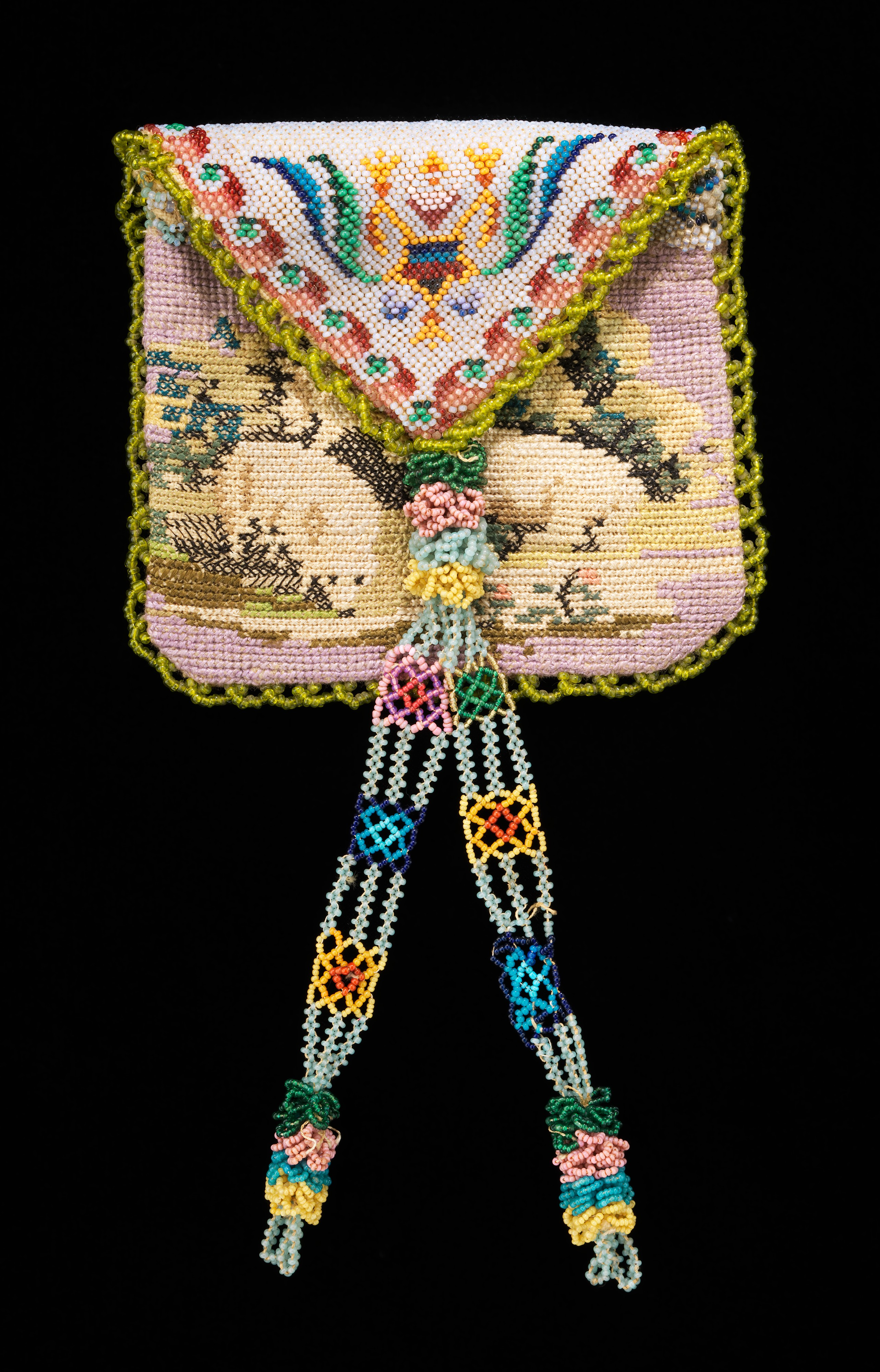
An early 19th-century Mexican handbag featuring a lamb and crown motif in traditional needlework and a silk dress lining

=== Contemporary types ===
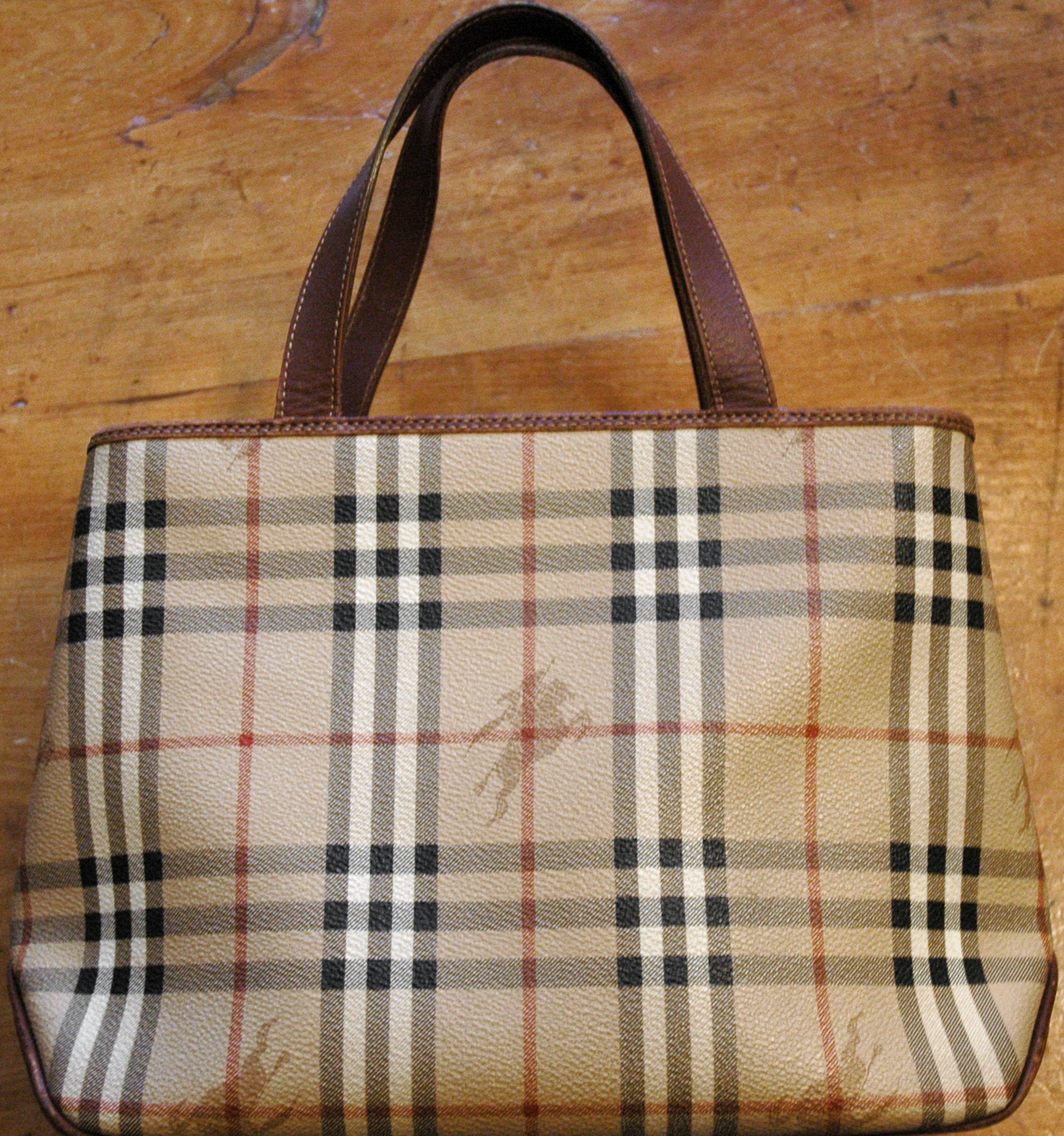
Ladies' Burberry tote (2005)

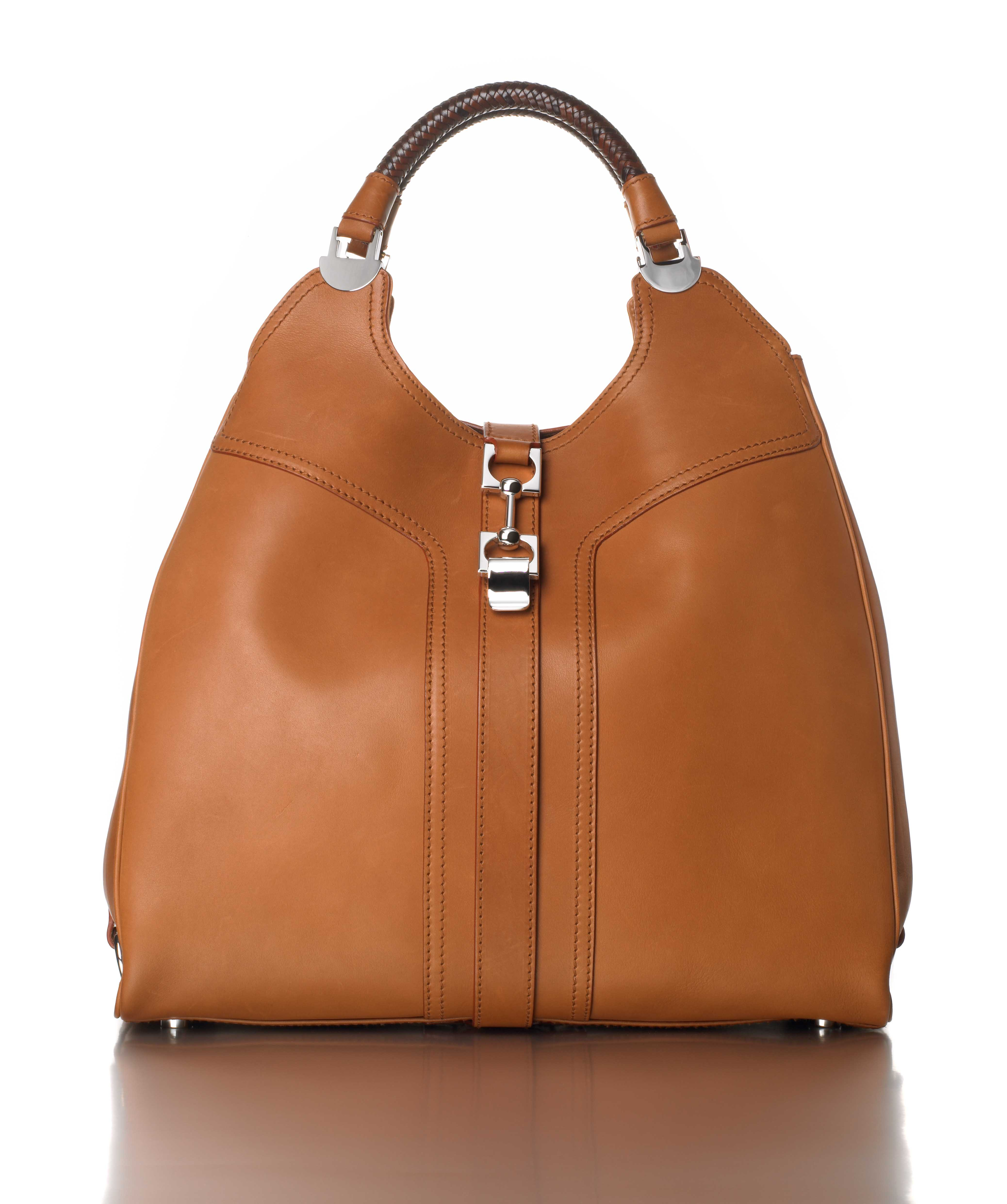
Tanner Krolle Eva hobo bag (2006)

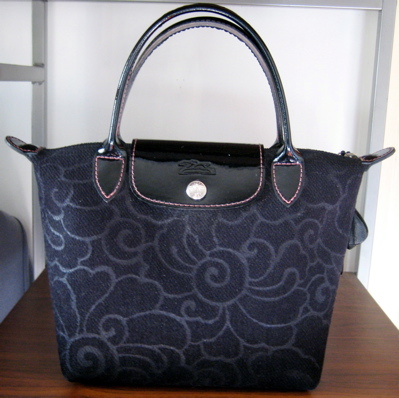
Longchamp tote bag

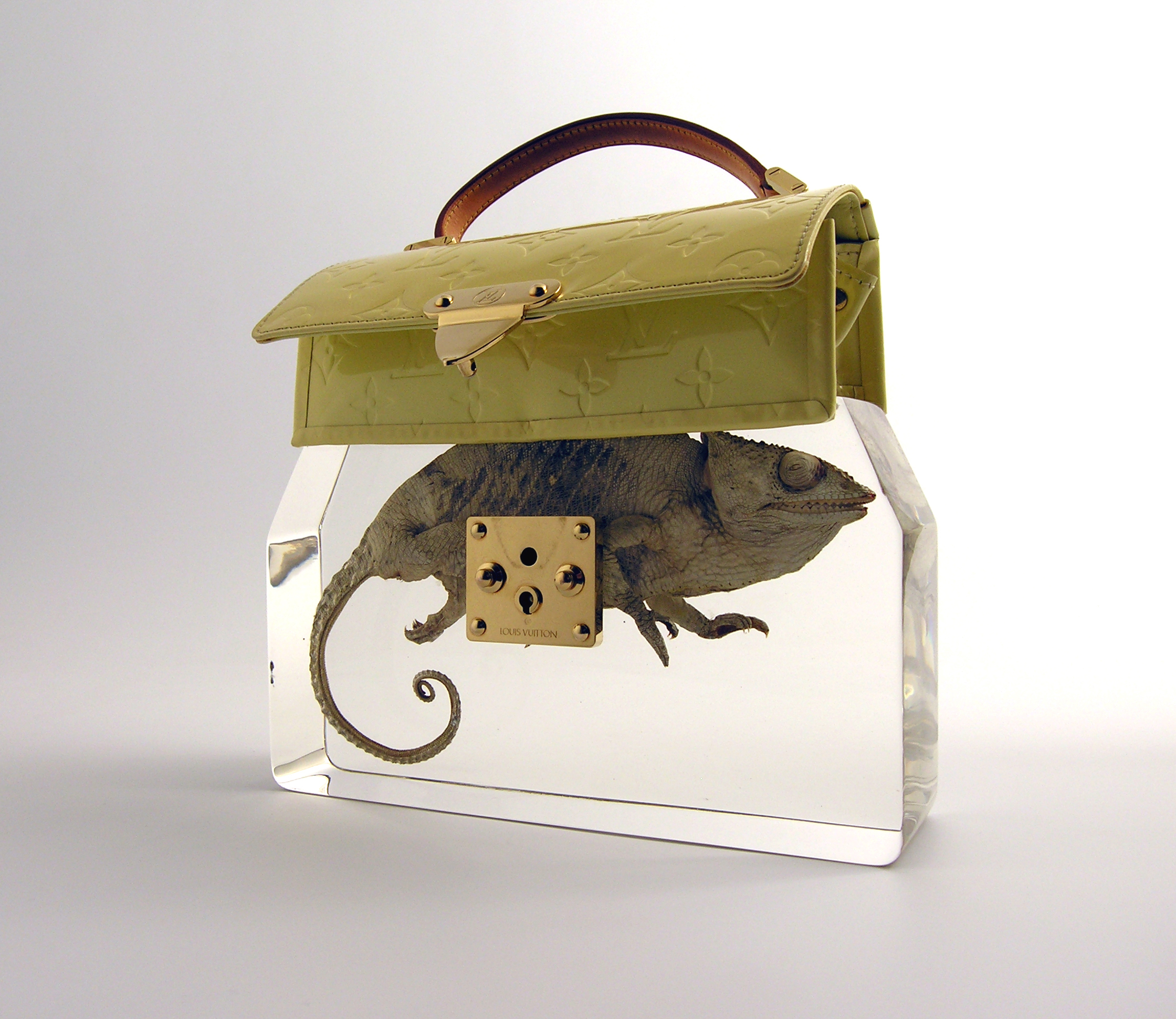
Ted Noten top handle bag (2009)

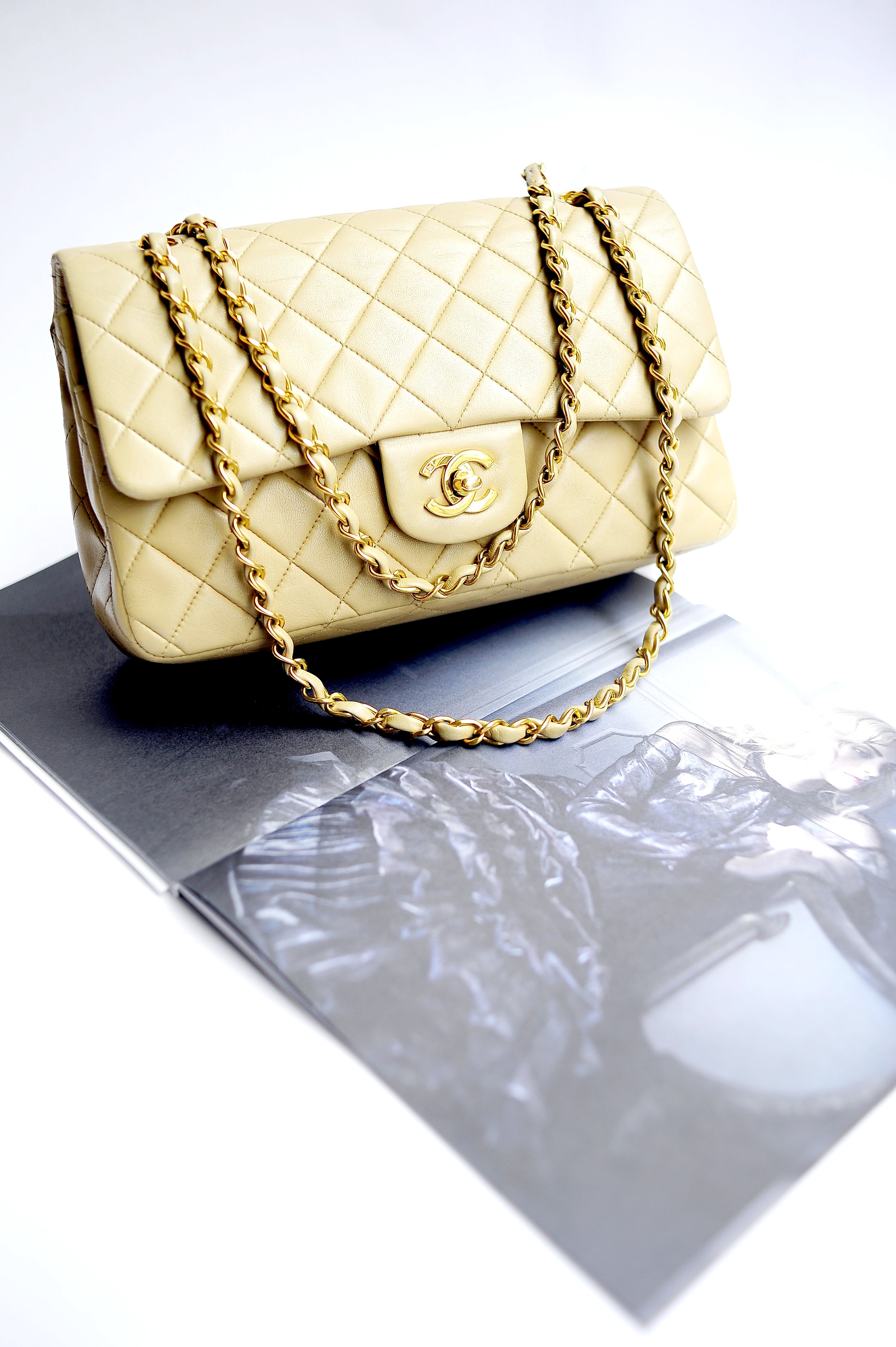
Chanel 2.55 satchel

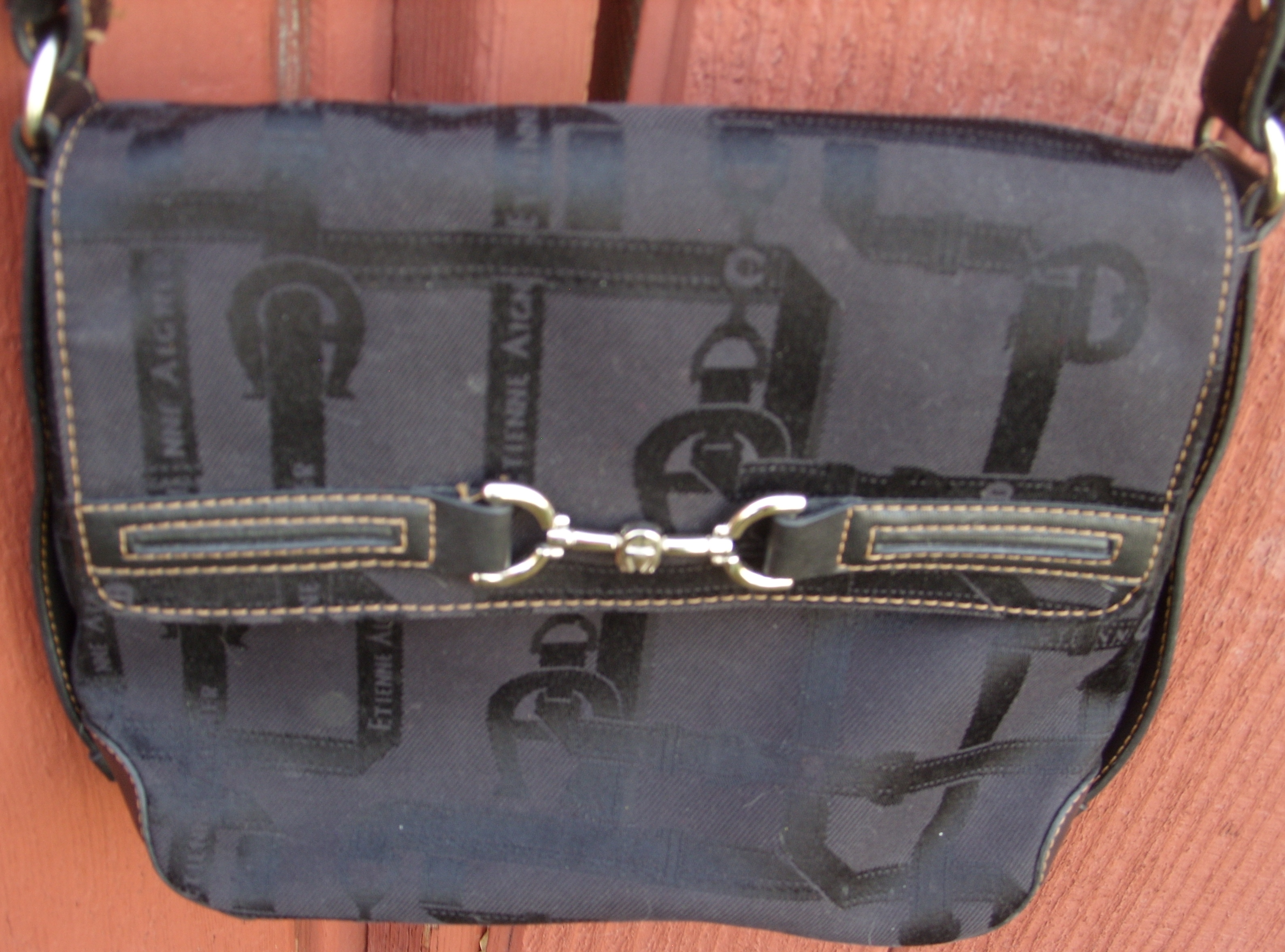
A satchel from French designer Etienne Aigner

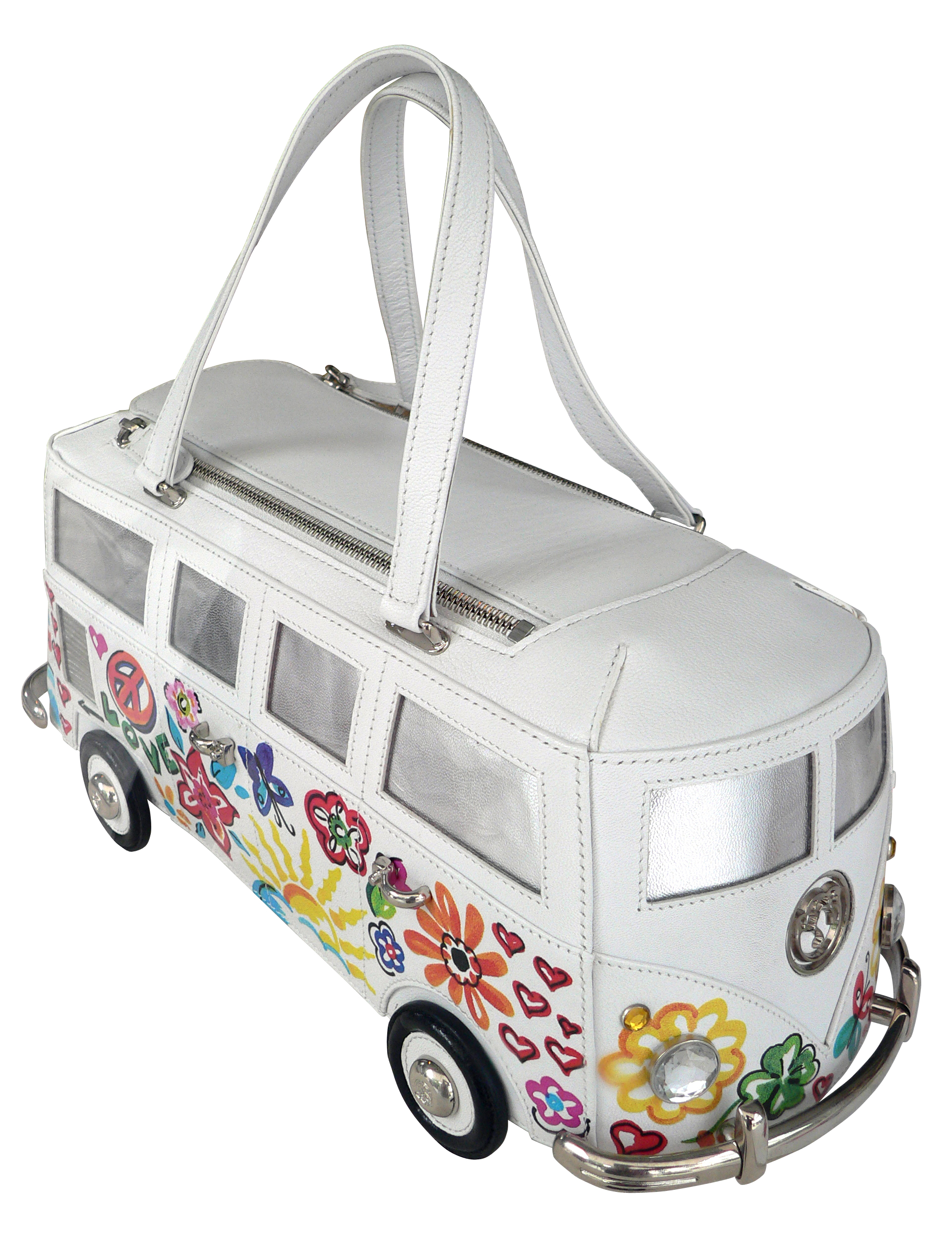
Tote shaped like vintage Volkswagen bus (2007)

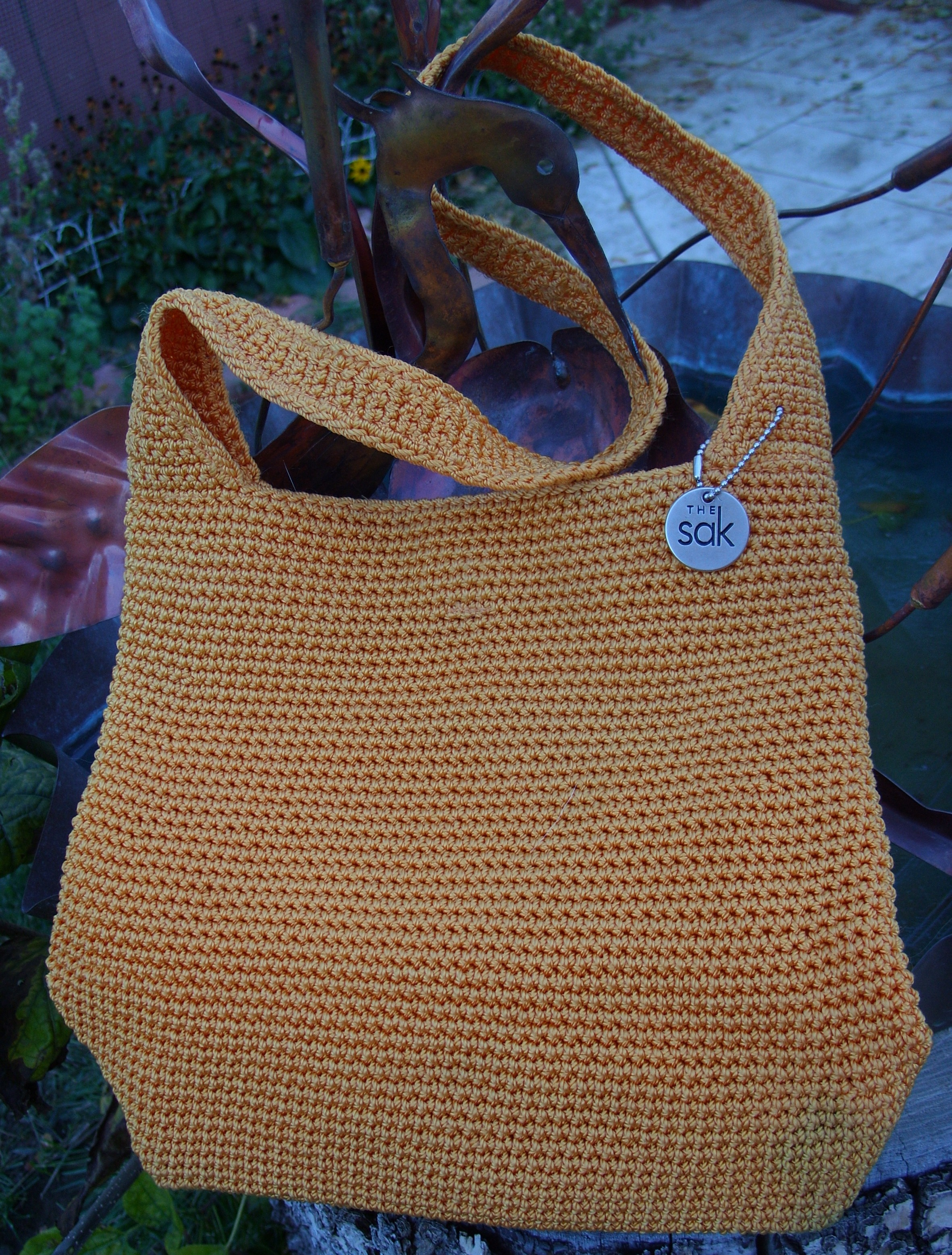
Crocheted bucket-style handbag by Sak.com

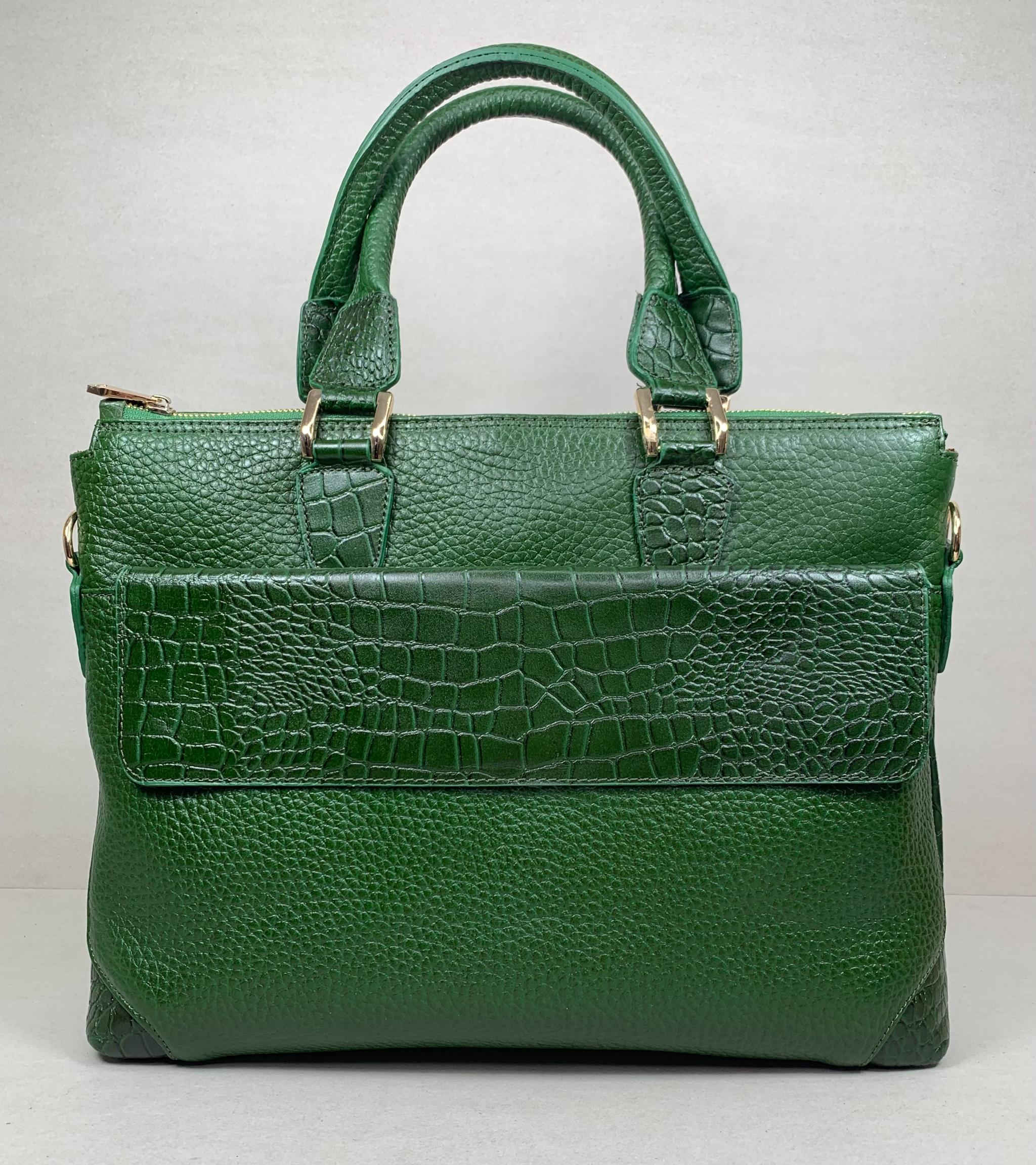
Large Handbag

== See also ==
- Belen Echandia
- Hervé Chapelier
- Chuspas
- ESSE Purse Museum in Little Rock, Arkansas
- Fanny pack
- Hunting bag
- Museum of Bags and Purses in Amsterdam, Netherlands
- Party plan
- Purse hook
- Purse organizer
- Shell purse
- Simone Handbag Museum in Seoul, South Korea
