= Gotham Book Prize =

Literary award

- Date: December
- Reward: $50,000
- First award: 2020
- Final award: Active
- Website: gothambookprize.org

The Gotham Book Prize is a $50,000 prize awarded annually to a fiction or non-fiction work judged the best about or set in New York City. The award was founded by venture capitalist Bradley Tusk and political consultant Howard Wolfson.

== Recipients ==
Gotham Book Prize winners and finalists
Year	Author	Title	Result	Ref.
2021	James McBride	Deacon King Kong	Winner	
2021	Rumaan Alam	Leave the World Behind	Finalist	
2021	Christopher Beha	The Index of Self-Destructive Acts	Finalist	
2021	David Goodwillie	Kings County	Finalist	
2021	Debra Jo Immergut	You Again	Finalist	
2021	N. K. Jemisin	The City We Became	Finalist	
2021	David Paul Kuhn	The Hard Hat Riot: Nixon, New York City, & the Dawn of the White Working-Class Revolution	Finalist	
2021	Raven Leilani	Luster	Finalist	
2021	Amy Poeppel	Musical Chairs	Finalist	
2021	Jerry Seinfeld	Is This Anything?	Finalist	
2022	Andrea Elliott	Invisible Child: Poverty, Survival & Hope in an American City	Winner	
2022	Tom Dyja	New York, New York: Four Decades of Success, Excess and Transformation	Finalist	
2022	Kaitlyn Greenidge	Libertie	Finalist	
2022	Zakiya Dalila Harris	The Other Black Girl	Finalist	
2022	Jim Lewis	Ghosts of New York	Finalist	
2022	Torrey Peters	Detransition, Baby	Finalist	
2022	Sarah Schulman	Let the Record Show: A Political History of ACT UP New York, 1987-1993	Finalist	
2022	Natalie Standiford	Astrid Sees All	Finalist	
2022	Elisabet Velasquez	When We Make It	Finalist	
2022	Colson Whitehead	Harlem Shuffle	Finalist	
2023	Sidik Fofana	Stories from the Tenants Downstairs	Winner (tie)	
2023	John Wood Sweet	The Sewing Girl’s Tale	Winner (tie)	
2023	Jill Bialosky	The Deceptions	Finalist	
2023	Hernan Diaz	Trust	Finalist	
2023	Xochitl Gonzalez	Olga Dies Dreaming	Finalist	
2023	James Hannaham	Didn't Nobody Give a Shit What Happened to Carlotta	Finalist	
2023	Lisa Hsiao Chen	Activities of Daily Living	Finalist	
2023	Dwyer Murphy	An Honest Living	Finalist	
2023	Bushra Rehman	Roses, in the Mouth of a Lion	Finalist	
2023	Mecca Jamilah Sullivan	Big Girl	Finalist	
2023	Martha Anne Toll	Three Muses	Finalist	
2024	Colson Whitehead	Crook Manifesto	Winner	
2024	Reuven Blau	Rikers: An Oral History, Graham Rayman	Finalist	
2024	Patrick Brinkley	All the Beauty in the World	Finalist	
2024	Aisha Abdel Gawad	Between Two Moons	Finalist	
2024	Patricia Park	Imposter Syndrome and Other Confessions of Alejandra Kim	Finalist	
2024	Prudence Peiffer	The Slip: The New York City Street That Changed American Art Forever	Finalist	
2024	Melissa Rivero	Flores and Miss Paula	Finalist	
2024	Joshunda Sanders	Women of the Post	Finalist	
2024	Maria Smilios	The Black Angels: The Untold Story of the Nurses Who Helped Cure Tuberculosis	Finalist	
2024	Alexander Stille	The Sullivanians: Sex, Psychotherapy, and the Wild Life of an American Commune	Finalist	
2024	Tyriek White	We Are a Haunting	Finalist	
2025	Nicole Gelinas	Movement: New York’s Long War to Take Back Its Streets from the Car	Winner (tie)	
2025	Ian Frazier	Paradise Bronx: The Life and Times of New York’s Greatest Borough	Winner (tie)	
2025	Anna Akbari	There Is No Ethan	Finalist	
2025	Rumaan Alam	Entitlement	Finalist	
2025	Andrew Boryga	Victim	Finalist	
2025	Xochitl Gonzalez	Anita de Monte Laughs Last	Finalist	
2025	Prithi Kanakamedala	Brooklynites: The Remarkable Story of the Free Black Communities that Shaped a Borough	Finalist	
2025	Lisa Ko	Memory Piece	Finalist	
2025	Joél Leon	Everything and Nothing at Once	Finalist	
2025	Muriel Leung	How to Fall in Love in a Time of Unnameable Disaster	Finalist	
2025	Tricia Romano	The Freaks Came Out to Write: The Definitive History of the Village Voice, the Radical Paper That Changed American Culture	Finalist	
2025	Guy Trebay	Do Something: Coming of Age Amid the Glitter and Doom of ’70s New York	Finalist	
2025	Karen Valby	The Swans of Harlem: Five Black Ballerinas, Fifty Years of Sisterhood, and Their Reclamation of a Groundbreaking History	Finalist	
2025	Yasmin Zaher	The Coin	Finalist	
2026	Lisa Ko	I Regret Almost Everything by Keith McNally	Winner	
2026	Andrew Ross Sorkin	1929	Finalist	
2026	Katie Kitamura	Audition	Finalist	
2026	Bench Ansfield	Born in Flames	Finalist	
2026	Keith McNally	I Regret Almost Everything	Finalist	
2026	Ravi Gupta	Garbage Town	Finalist	
2026	Victoria Christopher Murray	Harlem Rhapsody	Finalist	
2026	John Kenney	I See You've Called in Dead	Finalist	
2026	Mark Ronson	Night People: How to Be a DJ in '90s New York City	Finalist	
2026	Adam Ross	Playworld	Finalist	
2026	Jonathan Mahler	The Gods of New York	Finalist	
2026	Lili Taylor	Turning to Birds	Finalist	
