= John Galliano =

British fashion designer (born 1960)

John Galliano CBE RDI
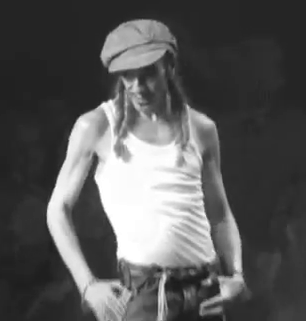
- Galliano in 2010
- Born: John Charles Galliano; 28 November 1960 (age 65); Gibraltar
- Other name: Juan Carlos Antonio Galliano-Guillén
- Education: Central Saint Martins
- Labels: Givenchy (1995–1997); Dior (1997–2011); Maison Margiela (2014–2024)
- Partner: Alexis Roche
- Awards: British Fashion Designer of the Year for 1987, '94, '95 and '97; Dress of the Year Fashion Museum, Bath for 1987; Order of the British Empire (2001); French Legion of Honour (2009; revoked 2012)

John Charles Galliano (born 28 November 1960) is a British fashion designer. He was the creative director of his eponymous label John Galliano and French fashion houses Givenchy and Dior. From 2014 to 2024, Galliano was the creative director of Paris-based fashion house Maison Margiela. Galliano has been named British Designer of the Year four times. In a 2004 poll for the BBC, he was named the fifth most influential person in British culture. The Metropolitan Museum of Art planned for the Costume Institute's Spring 2027 exhibition to be a retrospective of Galliano's work. Following renewed criticism over the designer's antisemitic remarks in 2011, the museum and the designer announced the cancellation of the exhibition in August 2026.

== Early life and education ==
Galliano was born in Gibraltar to a Gibraltarian father of Italian descent, Juan Galliano, and a Spanish mother, Ana Guillén, and has two sisters. His father worked as a plumber. Though registered at birth as John Charles Galliano, he has given his full name in interviews as Juan Carlos Antonio Galliano-Guillén. Galliano's family moved to England when he was six, settling in Streatham and later Dulwich and Brockley, in South London. He was raised in a strict Roman Catholic family.

Galliano attended St. Anthony's Primary School, Dulwich and Wilson's Grammar School in London. He went on to study at Central Saint Martins and graduated in 1984 with a first class honours degree in Fashion Design. His graduating collection was inspired by the French Revolution and entitled Les Incroyables. The collection received positive reviews and was bought in its entirety for resale in the London fashion boutique Browns.

== Career ==
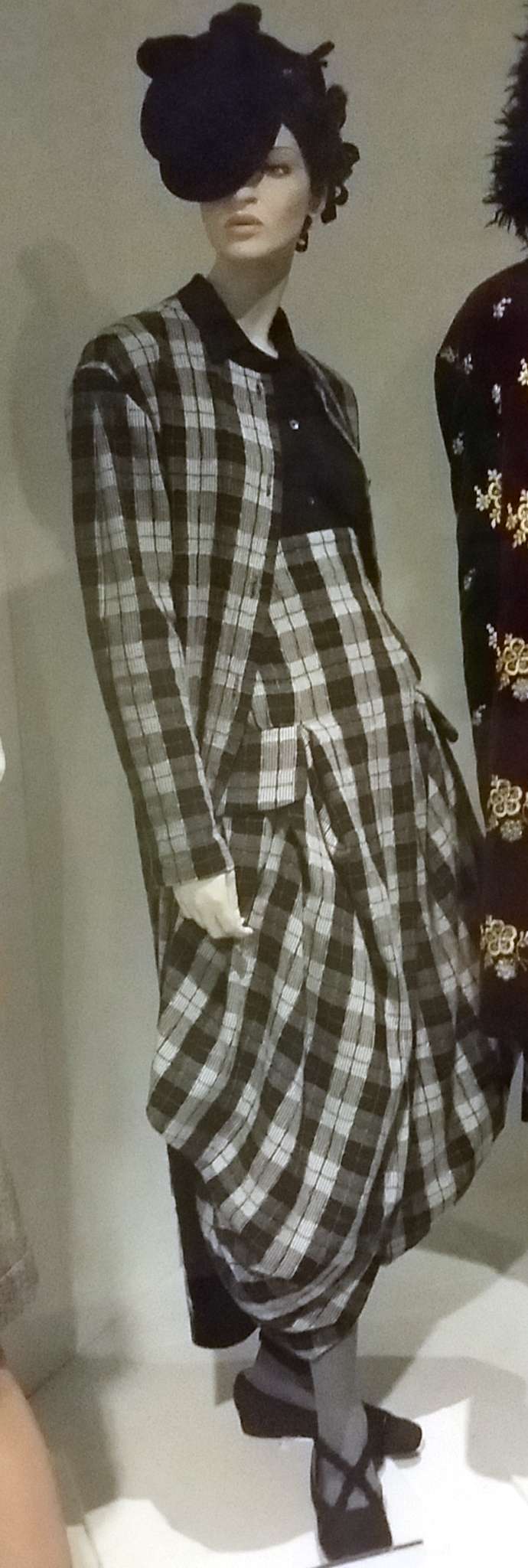
John Galliano ensemble; Dress of the Year for 1987

=== Early career and the John Galliano label ===
==== London ====
Galliano then started his own eponymous label alongside long-term collaborators Amanda Harlech, at that time stylist with Harpers and Queen, and milliner Stephen Jones.

Media fashion celebrity Susannah Constantine has worked for Galliano, and he has also aided the future success of other designers including shoe designer Patrick Cox. In 1991, he collaborated with Kylie Minogue, designing the costumes for her Let's Get to It Tour.

In 1993, Galliano's financial agreement with Amor ended, and he did not have a showing in October, missing the season. With the help of American Vogue editor-in-chief Anna Wintour and André Leon Talley, then European correspondent at Vanity Fair, Galliano was introduced to Portuguese socialite and fashion patron São Schlumberger and financial backers of venture firm Arbela Inc, John Bult and Mark Rice. It was through this partnership that Galliano received the financial backing and high society stamp needed to give him credibility in Paris. This collection was important in the development of Galliano as a fashion house and is regarded as a 'fashion moment' in high fashion circles. This show is historically known as The Black Show, that was quoted as the "most memorable show" by Anna Wintour in an interview with Page Six.

=== Givenchy ===
In July 1995, he was appointed as the head designer of Givenchy by Bernard Arnault, owner of luxury goods conglomerate LVMH. Galliano thus became the first British designer to head a French haute couture fashion house. On 21 January 1996, he presented his first couture show at the helm of Givenchy at the Stade de France. Some of Galliano's designs for Givenchy were licensed to Vogue Patterns. When he left Givenchy, he was succeeded by Alexander McQueen. McQueen's friend and muse, socialite Annabelle Neilson, was also a muse of Galliano.

=== Dior ===
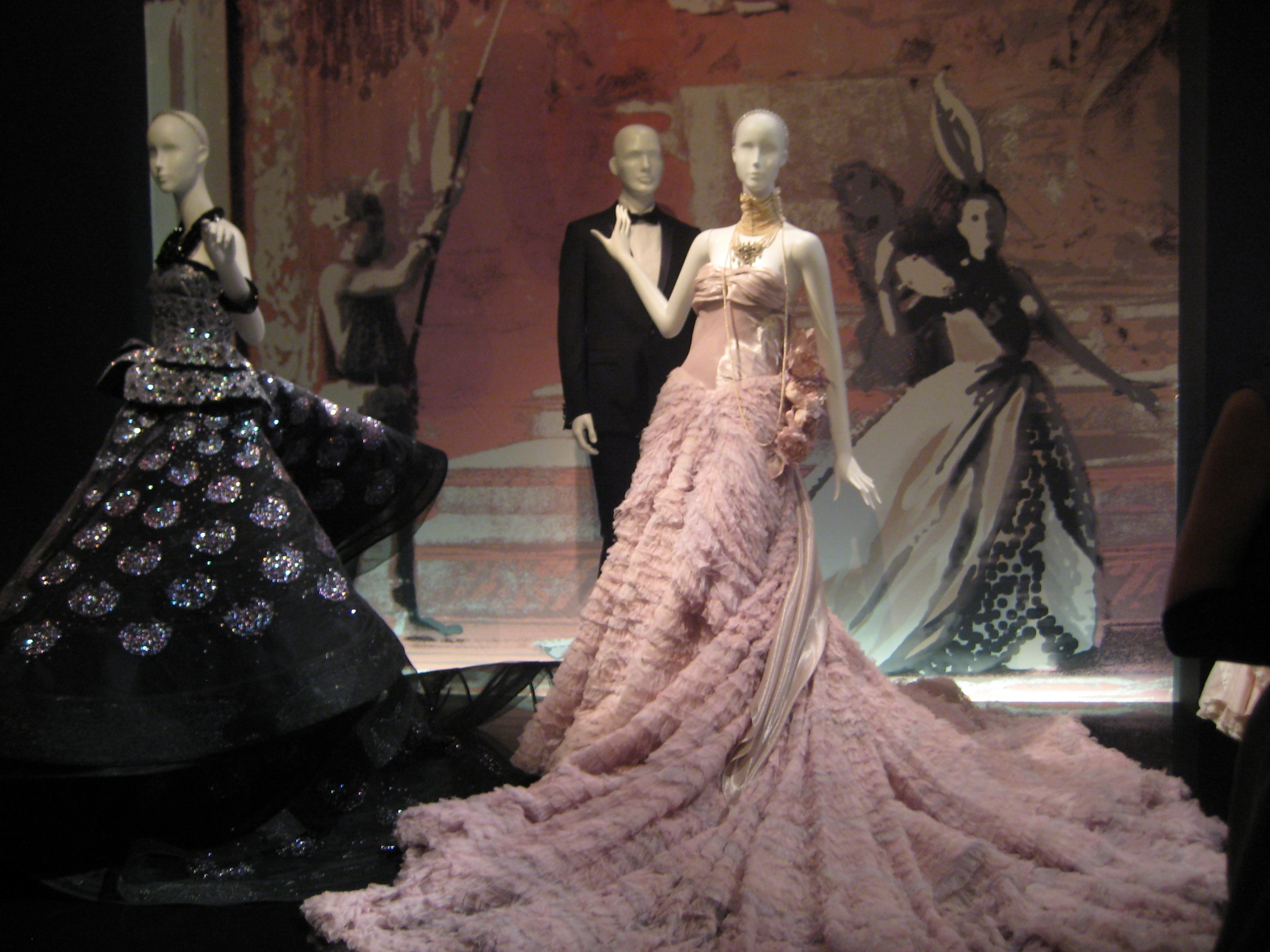
Galliano ballgowns designed for Dior as exhibited in Moscow, 2011

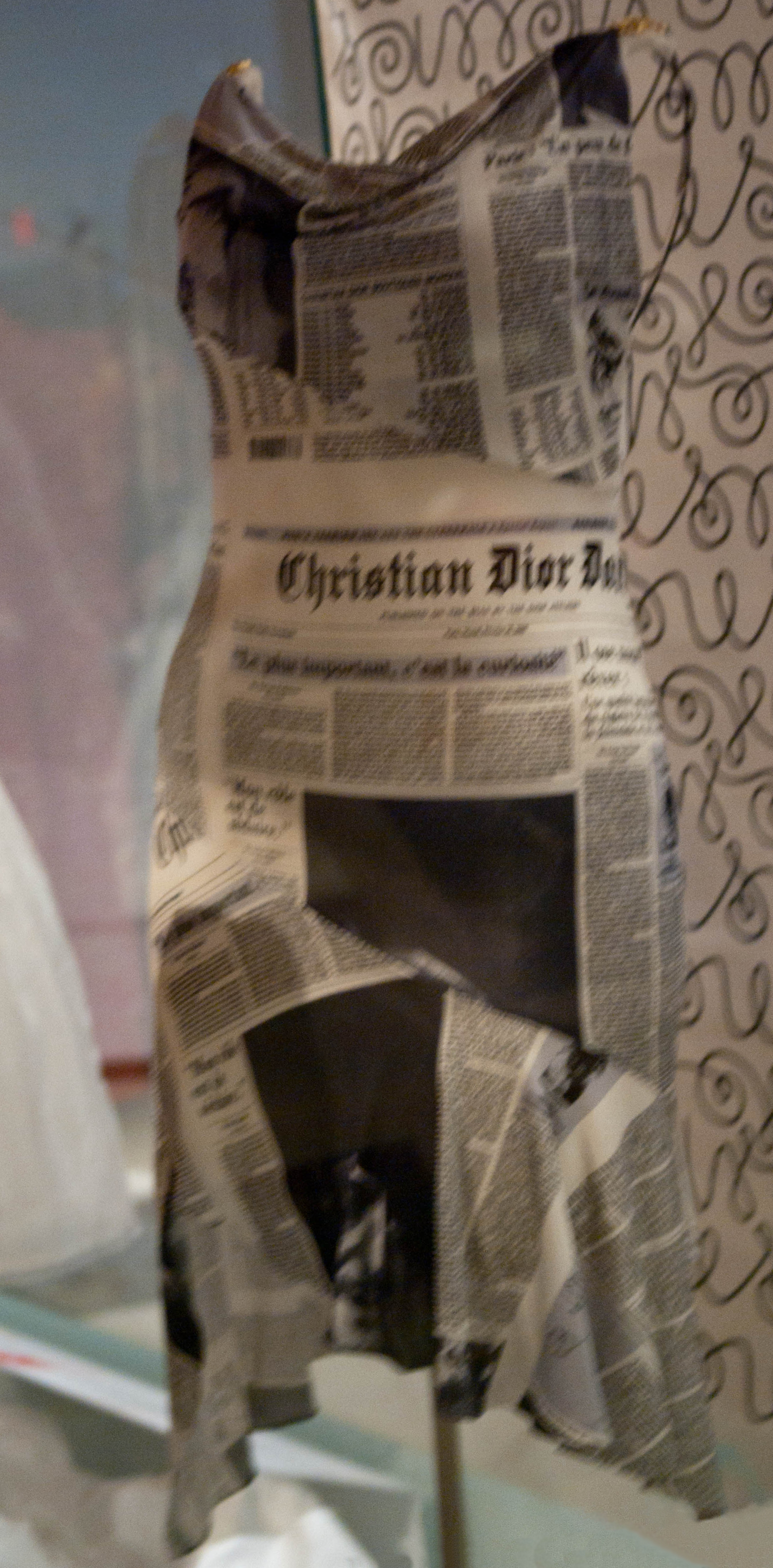
Galliano Dior newspaper dress at the Royal Ontario Museum donated by Kara Alloway, purchased by the Toronto "Real Housewife" at the Dior flagship in Paris.

In October 1996, LVMH moved Galliano to Christian Dior, replacing Italian designer Gianfranco Ferré. At Dior, Galliano's Haute Couture and ready-to-wear collections received critical acclaim. His designs at Dior included the Dior Saddle bag, which debuted in the Spring/Summer 2000 collection and became one of the most popular handbags. Galliano also designed the chartreuse Chinoiserie gown worn by Nicole Kidman at the 69th Academy Awards in 1997.

In 2007, a close friend and colleague of Galliano, Steven Robinson, died. At the time, it was maintained that he died from a heart attack, but it was later revealed to have been a drug overdose that killed him. Robinson had worked closely with Galliano and been his supporter, providing creative input for over 20 years and organising many of his events. According to the documentary "High and Low", Galliano stated Robinson's death affected him heavily.

In 2010, Galliano identified his love of theatre and femininity as central to his creations; he said "my role is to seduce", and credited Standard Oil heiress Millicent Rogers as an influence.

=== Antisemitic and racist remarks ===
Between October 2010 and February 2011, Galliano was involved in three reported incidents at La Perle, a bar in Paris, in which he was accused of making antisemitic or racist remarks. In the first, in October 2010, a woman later alleged that Galliano had directed antisemitic insults at her. In a separate incident in December 2010, Galliano was recorded on video saying that he loved Adolf Hitler and telling two women that people like them would have been killed in the Holocaust.

On 24 February 2011, Galliano was involved in a third incident at the same bar, in which he directed antisemitic remarks at museum curator Géraldine Bloch and racist insults at her companion, Philippe Virgitti. Dior suspended him the following day and announced on 1 March that it had begun proceedings to dismiss him as its creative director.

The remarks drew public responses from figures associated with Dior and Galliano. Actress Natalie Portman, then a Dior spokesperson, said that she was "deeply shocked" and would not associate with Galliano. French actress and model Eva Green, who is Jewish, said that she did not believe Galliano was antisemitic and attributed the remarks to his intoxication.

Galliano was prosecuted over the October 2010 and February 2011 incidents. The December video concerned a separate incident and was not the subject of an additional charge, although it was shown during the proceedings. His lawyer argued that the outbursts occurred while Galliano was experiencing work-related stress and addictions, and Galliano said that his mental state had also been affected by the death of his friend and business partner Steven Robinson. On 8 September 2011, a Paris court found Galliano guilty of public insults based on origin, religious affiliation, race or ethnicity and imposed suspended fines totalling €6,000.

Galliano later pursued an unfair-dismissal claim against companies associated with Dior and his namesake label. On 21 November 2013, the Paris Court of Appeals rejected an attempt by Christian Dior Couture SA to transfer the dispute from the Conseil de prud'hommes (Labour Court) to a commercial court and ordered Christian Dior Couture SA and John Galliano SA each to pay Galliano €2,500 plus court costs. Galliano, who had sought approximately €6 million in compensation, subsequently lost the unfair-dismissal case and was ordered to pay €1 to each opposing party.

=== Oscar de la Renta ===
In early 2013, Galliano accepted an invitation from Oscar de la Renta, brokered by Anna Wintour, for a temporary residency at de la Renta's design studio to help prepare for a showing of his Fall 2013 ready-to-wear collection during February New York Fashion Week. Galliano also received a measure of absolution from the Anti-Defamation League, which lauded his efforts to atone for his misdeeds and wished him well. The ADL again came to his defence after the New York Post ran a photo of him on his way to the de la Renta show dressed in what it claimed was Hasidic-like garb.

Galliano remained backstage at the show, which received favourable reviews amid speculation about his future, including as a possible successor to Oscar de la Renta and that Galliano might take up a teaching post at Parsons The New School for Design. On 12 June 2013, Galliano's first filmed interview since his dismissal from Christian Dior was broadcast on United States television. He closed this conversation by stating, "I am able to create. I am ready to create. ... [and] I hope through my atonement I'll be given a second chance".

=== Maison Margiela ===
On 6 October 2014, the OTB Group announced that John Galliano had joined Maison Margiela to take the responsibility of the creative direction of the house, marking the designer's return to a leading role in designing luxury fashion. Just a few weeks later, on the occasion of the annual British Fashion Awards, Galliano presented the Outstanding Achievement Award to Anna Wintour who wore Galliano's first creation for Maison Martin Margiela, "an unambiguous fashion blessing" from the Editor in Chief of American Vogue according to Vanessa Friedman, Fashion Director of The New York Times.

Galliano exhibited his first couture collection for Margiela during London Collections: Men, on 12 January 2015. He told French Elle in 2018 that he would stop using fur in his collections, citing as inspiration from a meeting with Penélope Cruz and PETA's Dan Mathews.

On 26 September 2018, Galliano made a statement in Paris at his Maison Margiela show, when he unveiled Mutiny, his first perfume for the fashion house.

The designer left Maison Margiela in December 2024.

=== Zara ===
In March 2026, Zara announced a two-year creative partnership with Galliano. Under the agreement, he was tasked with re-authoring pieces from the brand's archive through a series of seasonal collections, with the first launch scheduled for September 2026.

=== Metropolitan Museum of Art ===
In July 2026, the Metropolitan Museum of Art announced that the Costume Institute's Spring 2027 exhibition will be devoted to Galliano, concluding with his Spring/Summer 2024 collection for Maison Margiela. In preparation for the gala, Galliano and Andrew Bolton, curator in charge of the Met's Costume Institute, discussed the designer's antisemitic history with rabbis and Jewish leaders. Bolton told The New York Times, the exhibition will include that history. After the exhibition's announcement, the decision to honor Galliano with a retrospective was nonetheless controversial, both among designers and the Jewish community. In August 2026, it was announced in a joint statement by the museum and Galliano that the exhibition would not be going forward due to the designer's antisemitic and racist remarks in 2011. Galliano stated on his Instagram that "I also recognize and respect that an exhibition honoring my work would be painful for some."

== Personal life ==
Galliano had a relationship with fellow Central St Martins student and fashion designer John Flett (1963–1991), whom he described as his soulmate. Galliano currently shares his Paris home with his long-term partner Alexis Roche, a style consultant.

He is vegetarian for health reasons, telling French Elle that "The energy that I get from having fewer toxins in my body is extraordinary".

== Honours ==
- British Designer of the Year (1987, 1994, 1995, 1997). In 1997, he shared the award with Alexander McQueen, his successor at Givenchy.
- Commander of the Order of the British Empire in the 2001 Birthday Honours List for his services to the Fashion Industry as a Fashion Designer. He received his CBE on 27 November 2001 at Buckingham Palace in London, England.
- RDI for his contribution to the fashion industry (2002)
- Appearance on The Independent on Sunday's 2007 "pink list" for being one of "the most influential gay people in Britain"
- French Legion of Honour (2009). The medal was withdrawn by decree of the president of the Republic, François Hollande, published in the official journal on 20 August 2012.

Preceded by Hubert de Givenchy	Head Designer Givenchy; 1995–1996	Succeeded by Alexander McQueen
Preceded by Gianfranco Ferré	Head Designer Christian Dior; 1996–2011	Succeeded by Raf Simons
