= The Coin (novel) =

Contemporary Palestinian-French-American novel

- Author: Yasmin Zaher
- Cover artist: Jaya Miceli
- Language: English
- Publisher: Catapult Books
- Publication date: July 9, 2024
- Media type: Print (hardback and paperback), ebook, audiobook
- Pages: 240
- ISBN: 978-1-64622-210-0

The Coin is a 2024 novel by Palestinian writer Yasmin Zaher published by Catapult Books. It won the 2025 Dylan Thomas Prize, was a finalist for the 2025 Gotham Book Prize, and appeared on the New York Times 100 Notable Books of the Year list for 2024.

Zaher has claimed the novel's primary inspiration was Clarice Lispector's novel The Passion According to G.H., and cited Ottessa Moshfegh's novel My Year of Rest and Relaxation as its "soul sister," having read it after. She has been cited as being somewhat uncomfortable with the book's acclaim, due to how complex issues surrounding current affairs in Israel and Palestine may have driven such widespread initial interest in the novel. The novel has been celebrated for its bold representation of an immigrant living in America (even being touted by The Millions as "the Year's Best New York City Novel"), and has received much critical acclaim, with Elif Batuman saying she "loved" the "bonkers" novel and Slavoj Žižek citing it as a "masterpiece"

== Plot summary ==
The Coin follows an unnamed, cleanliness-obsessed Palestinian woman who becomes a middle school English teacher at Franklin Middle School in New York City. Her teaching methods are unconventional, and she often allows her students "free days" of unprogrammed learning. She attempts to be a "general" to the students, and to teach them about what she considers important, rather than directly following the school curriculum. Her relationships with the students in her classroom develop nuance throughout the novel, especially with Jay, Sal, Leonard, and Carl. Her influence leads the students to form a group called the Dandies, who dress in bowties and organize a strike against the school. One of the leaders of the Dandies, Leonard, is expelled from school after it is discovered he stole the narrator's wallet (some of the money from which he gave to his mom and some of which he used to buy expensive burgers for the class).

The narrator's obsession with cleanliness manifests throughout the novel and is central to much of its plot. She often goes on multiple-hour-long "CVS retreats" in which she buys products at CVS in order to bathe and manicure herself, repeatedly referencing "gray snakes" that come off her body in the shower as a sign of uncleanliness. She believes a coin she swallowed in her childhood to be the source of a "blazing and spinning" area in the center of her back that she is unable to reach with her loofah.

The narrator has an ongoing romantic relationship with a rich man named Sasha, though she continually refers to her lack of real interest in him. She gets him to attend a fundraising gala for Palestine run by Curls, a woman with whom she earlier has a sexual encounter. She meets a mysterious homeless man, known only to the reader as "Trenchcoat" for the fact that they met while he was wearing a trench coat the narrator had previously abandoned on the subway, who espouses an ideology that living a rich life is entirely a performance. The narrator travels with him to Europe and helps him with a scheme to purchase and resell Birkin bags. When they return from Europe, she gets Sasha to take her up north in order to be in nature, and their argument in the car ride back leads them to break up, seemingly for good.

As we near the end of the novel, the narrator's spiral into a mental breakdown becomes more and more obvious. She eventually decides to transform her entire apartment, repainting the walls, transplanting dirt, moving her furniture to a now-boarded off bathroom, planting a garden, taking the fish she had previously purchased for the classroom and placing them, along with a 15-year-old koi, in a kiddie pool, and more. She lives in this pseudo-wilderness for a couple of weeks before returning to work, where her boss, Aisha, reveals to her that someone flooded and set fire to the school. Aisha demands the narrator's CVS basket containing her students' notebooks in hopes of finding the culprit, and the narrator walks back to her apartment, which she decides to clean and return to its normal state.

The novel is filled with unreliable narration that casts the protagonist as sarcastic, punchy, sexually inappropriate, and politically incorrect. Woven throughout by the narrator are sentences and sections in second person addressed to an ambiguous "you," flashbacks, recounted dreams, and tirades. The novel addresses many themes, including but not limited to colonialism, sexuality, class (particularly its performativity), race, and societal norms.

== Cover ==
The original cover design of the book was a woman with her back to the viewer in a trench coat on a pink background, but the final cover design by Jaya Miceli features a woman, in heels and wearing a white trench coat, contorted and reaching around herself, with a cab yellow background.

In the bottom right corner of every page of the novel is a black-and-white coin in a different position after being dropped, allowing the pages to work as a flip book, where the reader can see the coin fall, spin, and settle on a surface.
