= Bench Ansfield =

American historian

- Awards: Los Angeles Times Book Prize (2025); Anisfield-Wolf Book Award (2026); Athenaeum Literary Award (2025)

Academic background
- Education: Wesleyan University (BA, 2008); Yale University (MPhil, MA, 2016; PhD, 2021)
- Doctoral advisor: Joanne Meyerowitz and Michael Denning
- Website: benchansfield.com

Bench Ansfield is an American historian. Ansfield is an assistant professor at Temple University, where they teach history. They are best known for their 2025 book, Born in Flames, which was a finalist for the Pulitzer Prize and the winner of the Los Angeles Times Book Prize, Anisfield-Wolf Book Award, Francis Parkman Prize, Frederick Jackson Turner Award, and Athenaeum Literary Award.

== Early life and education ==
Ansfield grew up in Milwaukee and received a Bachelor of Arts in African American studies from Wesleyan University (2008). They spent five years organizing with the transformative justice organization Philly Stands Up, after which they attended Yale University, earning a Master of Philosophy and Master of Arts in American studies (2016), followed by a Doctor of Philosophy in American studies (2021). Their doctorate was supervised by American historians Joanne Meyerowitz and Michael Denning.

Ansfield's doctoral dissertation received the 2022 Allan Nevin Prize from the Society of American Historians, the Zuckerman Prize in American Studies from the McNeil Center for Early American Studies, the Herman E. Krooss Prize from the Business History Conference, and the Theron Rockwell Field Prize from Yale University. The dissertation has been adapted into Ansfield's 2025 nonfiction book, Born in Flames, with some parts being published in academic journals, through which Ansfield received the Louis Pelzer Award from the Organization of American Historians and the Arnold Hirsch Award from the Urban History Association.

== Career ==
Ansfield started their career as an American American Democracy Fellow at Harvard University, after which they took a postdoctoral fellowship at Dartmouth College. In 2024, they became an assistant professor of history at Temple University.

In 2025, Ansfield published their debut book, Born in Flames: The Business of Arson and the Remaking of the American City, with W. W. Norton & Company. The book explores the history of landlords committing arson in The Bronx in the 1970s to file insurance claims. Born in Flames was well received by critics, including starred reviews from Kirkus Reviews and Publishers Weekly. The New York Times included it on their list of "100 Notable Books" for 2025, and Kirkus Reviews named it one of the best non-fiction books of the year. In 2025, it won the Athenaeum Literary Award and the Los Angeles Times Book Prize for History. The following year, it won the Anisfield-Wolf Book Award for Nonfiction and the Francis Parkman Prize. It was also shortlisted for the Gotham Book Prize, J. Anthony Lukas Book Prize, NAACP Image Award for Outstanding Literary Work – Nonfiction, and Pulitzer Prize for History.
