= Dior Saddle bag =

Designer handbag by Dior

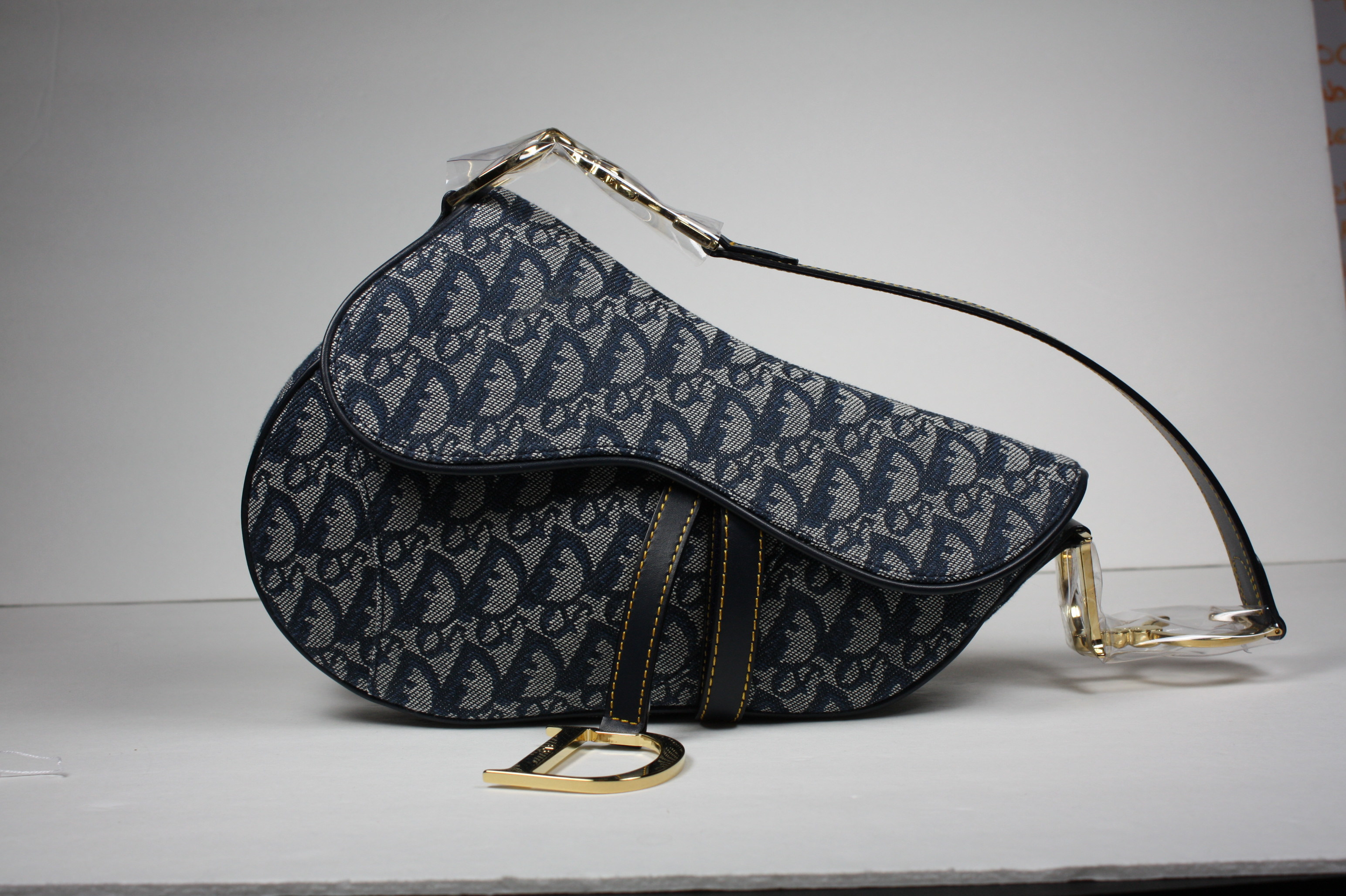
Dior Saddle bag displayed in blue monogrammed canvas.

The Dior Saddle bag is a designer handbag introduced in 1999 by French fashion house Dior under the creative direction of John Galliano. Inspired by equestrian themes, the asymmetrical, saddle-shaped bag debuted in Dior's Spring/Summer 2000 ready-to-wear collection, which incorporated stylistic references to rapper Lauryn Hill. The Saddle bag gained popularity in the early 2000s after being carried by public figures such as Paris Hilton, Foxy Brown, and Sarah Jessica Parker's character, Carrie Bradshaw, in Sex and the City.

After a period of decline, the bag experienced a resurgence in the late 2010s and has since become associated with high-end fashion and collectible designer accessories. It has been ranked by Who What Wear among the ten most popular handbags of all time, and is frequently referred to in fashion media as an "it bag".

== History ==
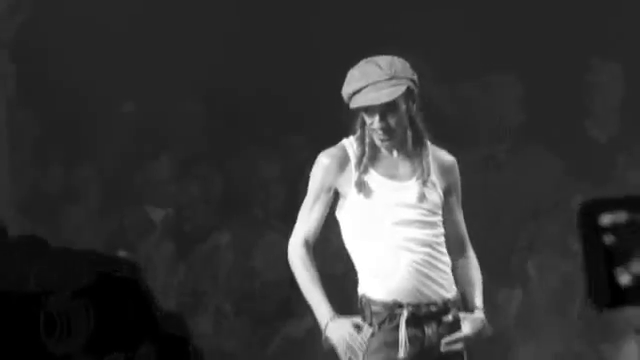
John Galliano, creative director of Dior when the Saddle bag was introduced.

The Dior Saddle bag debuted during the brand's Spring/Summer 2000 ready-to-wear runway presentation, presented in October 1999 under the creative direction of John Galliano.

The collection incorporated equestrian references along with elements of streetwear and hip-hop fashion. Commentators described the collection as a significant departure from Dior's previous aesthetic, with The Herald characterizing the handbag as "funky, streetwise and cool".

In a conversation with André Leon Talley, Galliano cited Lauryn Hill as a direct inspiration for the line, stating "I was dancing with her onstage, with Nina Simone, when she was in concert in Paris last summer. She stands for all the things I love." The runway show included Hill's 1998 single "Everything Is Everything" from The Miseducation of Lauryn Hill (1998) as its soundtrack, and models were styled with locs, denim outfits, and Saddle bags, echoing Hill's appearance in the song's music video, where she is depicted with locs, a denim jacket and a shoulder bag.

Some fashion writers have speculated that the bag may have drawn partial inspiration from Helmut Newton's 1976 photograph Saddle I, Paris, which depicts a model wearing a saddle on her back in a suggestive pose. Dior did not confirm the connection, however, the brand's early 2000s advertising campaigns for the Saddle bag featured themes of sensuality. A Spring/Summer 2000 campaign photographed by Nick Knight included an image of models Gisele Bündchen and Rhea Durham with the Saddle bag.

Rapper Foxy Brown appeared with the Saddle bag shortly after its runway debut, performing at the opening of Dior's boutique inside the LVMH Tower in New York City in late 1999 while wearing a full look from the collection. Guests were invited to the event with a denim-printed, Saddle bag-shaped invitation designed by Galliano.

The Saddle bag gained broader attention in season three of the television series Sex and the City, when costume designer Patricia Field styled Sarah Jessica Parker's character, Carrie Bradshaw, with the accessory. The handbag was later seen on public figures, such as Sienna Miller, Christina Aguilera, and Mischa Barton, Paris Hilton and Nicole Richie, contributing to its classification as an It bag by fashion media. Vogue dubbed the Saddle bag as a "pop culture phenomenon" and a defining item of Y2K fashion.

By 2001, Dior's accessories sales had reportedly increased by 60%. Galliano continued to release new designs of the handbag, including variations in denim, monogram, camouflage, and newspaper print.

== Design and features ==
The Dior Saddle bag has a distinctive, asymmetrical curved shape inspired by a horse saddle, typically including a dangling "D" charm, a short shoulder strap and hand-stitched piping. Galliano's original designs were produced using materials such as denim and leather. Under Maria Grazia Chiuri, later editions introduced new versions made with calfskin, beading, and patchwork florals.

Due to its popularity, the Saddle bag has been commonly counterfeited and sold among replica goods on New York City's Canal Street. In 2023, Dior's attempt to trademark the Saddle bag's shape in the European Union was denied on the grounds that the bag's design lacked distinctiveness.

== Cultural impact ==
According to Who What Wear, the Dior Saddle bag is among the ten most popular designer handbags ever, remaining one of the brand's definitive accessories. It has been included in lists of influential designer handbags alongside the Birkin bag, Chanel 2.55, and Baguette. The Saddle bag contributed to a shift toward a more youth-driven, provocative, and globalized aesthetic for Dior.

Although interest in the Saddle bag decreased in the late 2000s, the bag experienced renewed attention in 2014 when singer Beyoncé was photographed carrying a vintage version. It later appeared on public figures including CL, Bella Hadid, Rihanna, Jennifer Lawrence, and Taylor Swift. In 2018, Dior's creative director Maria Grazia Chiuri reissued the Saddle bag in multiple formats and launched a marketing campaign involving fashion influencers that reportedly led to a 957% spike in online searches, according to Harper's Bazaar.

A men's version of the Saddle bag was later introduced in 2019 by fashion designer Kim Jones for Dior Homme, and gained popularity in high-fashion streetwear communities, and was photographed on actor Kit Connor. A limited-edition all-metal men's version, which retailed for $35,000, was later photographed on media personality Kim Kardashian.

The secondary market value of vintage Saddle bags increased significantly in the 2010s and 2020s. A 2025 study analyzing resale appreciation, brand influence, and consumer demand ranked the Saddle bag as the most valuable fashion item of the previous decade, citing its overall value increase and a 7,400% surge in online search interest.

== See also ==
- Parfums Christian Dior
