= The Coin =

The Coin may refer to:

- Louis Colavecchio (1942–2020), American counterfeiter, known as "The Coin"
- The Coin (novel), a 2024 novel by Palestinian writer Yasmin Zaher
