= David Paul Kuhn =

American writer

- Occupations: Journalist; Author
- Website: www.davidpaulkuhn.com

David Paul Kuhn is an American author, journalist and political analyst. His book, The Hardhat Riot: Nixon, New York City, and the Dawn of the White Working-Class Revolution, was recognized by The New York Times as one of the "100 Notable Books of 2020." In 2025, the book was turned into a PBS documentary, titled Hard Hat Riot.

== Career ==
Early in his career, Kuhn reported on the United States for the Tokyo-based Yomiuri Shimbun. During this period, Kuhn covered issues including anthrax, North Korean nuclear negotiations, and the September 11th attacks. He wrote about his experience at the Twin Towers, on September 11, 2001, in the book At Ground Zero.

Since his first book in 2007, Kuhn has examined the Democratic Party's declining working-class support, particularly among white voters, and the male side of the gender gap in American politics. On June 26, 2020, former Senator Jim Webb wrote in The Wall Street Journal that Kuhn is an "unacknowledged prophet" because "over the past 15 years few writers have covered this realignment" of "white working people" from the Democratic Party to the GOP with "the consistency of David Paul Kuhn, whose warnings about the reasons white working people were moving away from the Democrats were largely dismissed by the news media and party elites."

Kuhn has analyzed American politics for networks including BBC, Fox News Channel, and CNN. Kuhn has served as the chief political writer for CBS, a senior political writer for Politico, and as chief political correspondent for RealClearPolitics. In 2009, he wrote his first piece for the Wall Street Journal on the subject of gender differences during economic disruption and the political repercussions. Kuhn first wrote for The New York Times in 2016, and continues to write for them.

On September 30, 2025, American Experience on PBS aired a documentary titled Hard Hat Riot adapted from Kuhn's 2020 book of the same name. Kuhn also co-produced and appeared in the documentary. According to The Boston Globe, the documentary is about “a hinge point in American politics, a major turn in what became the working class decades-long shift toward the Republican Party."

== Books ==
Kuhn's first book, The Neglected Voter: White Men and the Democratic Dilemma, was published in 2007 and received positive reviews.

Kuhn's second book, the political novel What Makes It Worthy, was published in 2015.

The Hardhat Riot: Nixon, New York City, and the Dawn of the White Working-Class Revolution, was published in July 2020. It was a New York Times Book Review Editors' Choice. The Washington Post book review called it "engrossing, well-crafted," "deeply researched," adding that "Kuhn writes with empathy for both sides" and "concludes with a sharp analysis of how the revolt of the white working-class almost immediately reshaped American politics."The New York Times review called it a "compelling narrative." The New York Daily News reported that the book, which tells the story of the Hard Hat Riot of May 8, 1970, as well as the antecedents and aftermath, is about how a "day changed American politics, perhaps forever." The Wall Street Journal book review wrote that the book "insightfully explains why and how" the white working-class tilted "the 2016 election to Donald Trump," centered around the microcosm of a "riveting account of the May 1970 explosion of New York's blue-collar workers." Reviews in the Journal of Interdisciplinary History and the Journal of Social History offered critical assessments, including Daniel Schlozman of Johns Hopkins University who criticized the book for adhering to an "illusion" that "condescending elites" pushed out "FDR's everyman." The book was praised in reviews in the journal The Sixties and by historian Vincent Cannato. Jill Lepore of Harvard University also commended it, writing in The New Yorker that The Hardhat Riot was a "riveting book." New York magazine's "Approval Matrix" placed the book in its quadrant for "brilliant" and "highbrow." In 2021, the book was a finalist for the Gotham Book Prize.
