= Giuliana Camerino =

Italian fashion designer (1920–2010)

Giuliana Camerino in aRoberta di Camerino dress with trompe-l'œil buckled belt print, c. 1960

Giuliana Camerino (née Coen; December 8, 1920 – May 10, 2010) was an Italian fashion designer who founded the Roberta di Camerino fashion house in Venice, the only major Italian fashion brand to be based in the historic seafaring and trading city. The label is principally known for its velvet handbags, though it has also produced womenswear and shoes. Giuliana Camerino has been credited with creating the concept of the status bag.

== Early life ==
Giuliana Coen was born in 1920 to a Jewish family in Venice. Her grandfather had a pigment factory, where Giuliana learned to match colours, and which would later become the atelier for her fashion house. She married banker Guido Camerino, with whom she had two children, a son, Ugo, and a daughter, Roberta.

In 1943, to escape the persecution of Jews in Italy during the Second World War, the Camerinos fled to Switzerland where Giuliana started designing handbags for a local leather goods store.

== Roberta di Camerino ==
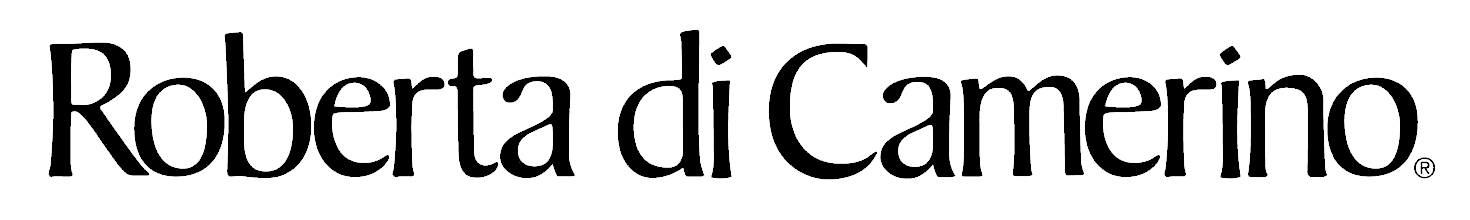

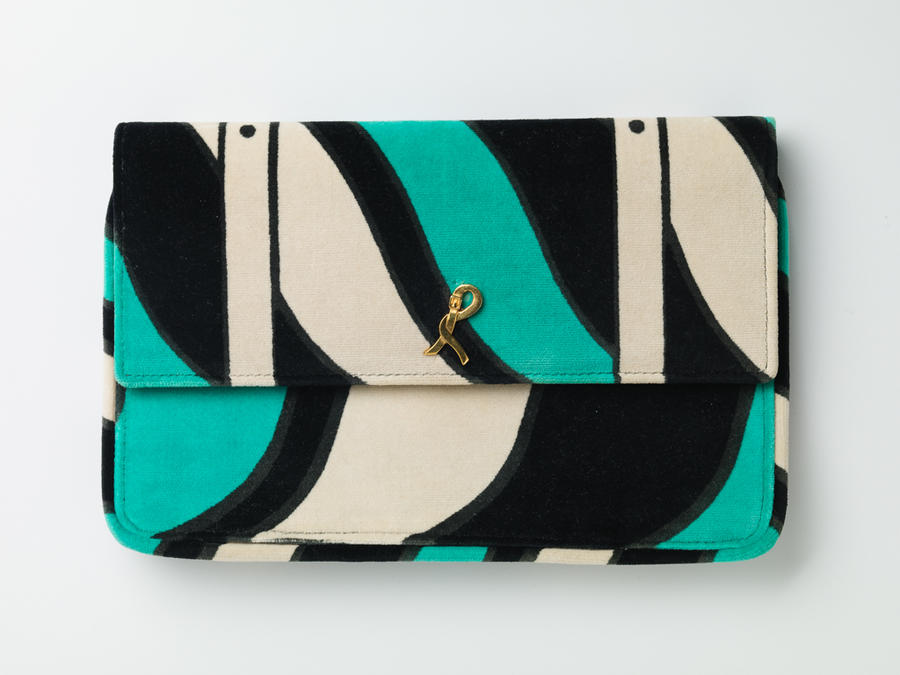

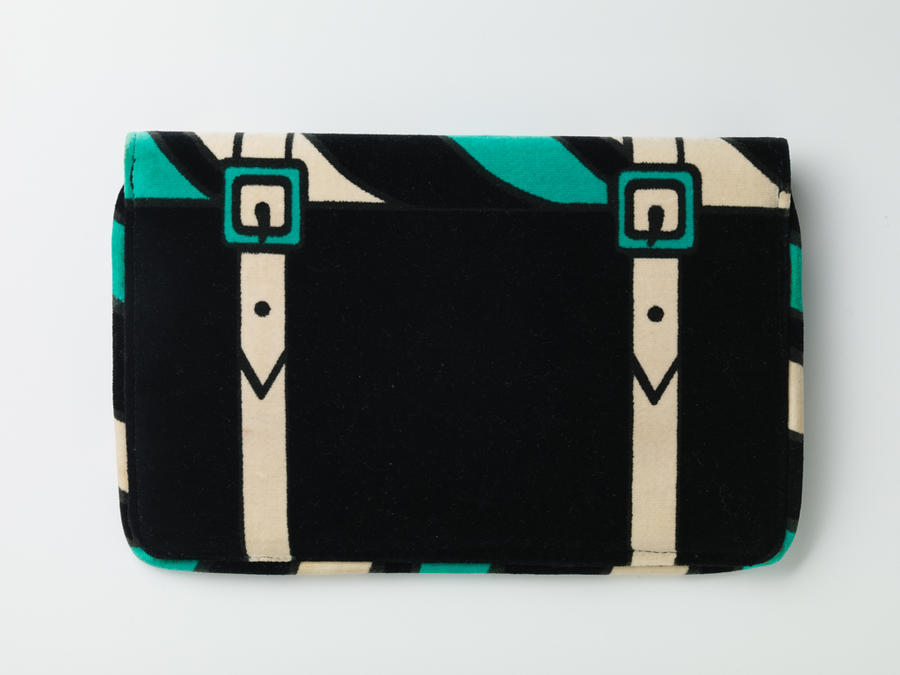
1971 velvet clutch bag with trompe l'oeil buckle print (RISD Museum)

The fashion house Roberta di Camerino was founded in 1945 when the Camerinos returned to Italy after the War ended. It was named after the film Roberta, starring Fred Astaire and Ginger Rogers. The song Smoke Gets In Your Eyes from the film was the last song that Giulliana Camerino danced to before fleeing for Switzerland, and so she took the professional name Roberta as a memory of earlier, happy times.

Roberta di Camerino's handbags were renowned for their innovativeness. They used richly patterned and coloured fabrics that had formerly been only used for clothing. In 1946, she made a bag patterned with a trellis of R's, foreshadowing Gucci's G's; in 1957 she made woven leather bags before Bottega Veneta did, and in 1964, she made a handbag with an articulated frame that was later reproduced by Prada. Her designs were widely copied. Although this upset her, Coco Chanel reassured her, telling her not to cry about being copied, but to 'cry the day they don't copy you'.

Camerino won a Neiman Marcus Fashion Award in 1956 in recognition of the success and influence of her handbags. Her cut-velvet bags featured brass hardware made by Venetian craftsmen, and were carried by celebrities such as Grace Kelly, Farrah Fawcett, and Elizabeth Taylor. In addition to the handbags, which often featured trompe-l'œil buckles and flaps, Roberta di Camerino also sold coats, dresses, and other clothing. Some of her fabrics were woven on antique looms, which helped support local industry in post-war Italy. The first Roberta di Camerino fashion show, held in Venice in 1949, was remembered for its theatricality.

In 1980 Camerino closed her fashion house in order to focus her energies into profitable licensing deals for ties, scarves, aprons, and wallpaper. That same year, the Whitney Museum of American Art held an exhibition of her work. Another exhibition of her work was held at the Fashion Institute of Technology museum in late 1999.

In 1996 the Roberta di Camerino label was revived, offering re-issues of their handbags, which were sold through New York department stores, including Neiman Marcus, who, in the 1950s, had been the first American stockist of Camerino bags. In 2008, at Milan Fashion Week, Sixty Group acquired the Roberta di Camerino label. The creative director of the label is Giorgia Scarpa, formerly of Prada and Christian Dior, and the general manager, Alessandro Varisco, formerly of Gianfranco Ferre and Versace. In order to concentrate on the luxury handbag market, Sixty Group dissolved many existing Roberta di Camerino licenses, including eyewear, knitwear, and small leather goods.

== Death ==
Giuliana Camerino was taken ill suddenly on Istria, near Venice, and died in Venice during the night of May 10, 2010. She was 89. Giorgio Orsoni, the Mayor of Venice, paid tribute to her as a friend and entrepreneur and an active promoter of Venice and Italian-made goods.
