= Stories from the Tenants Downstairs =

2022 short story collection by Sidik Fofana

- First edition of hardcover
- Author: Sidik Fofana
- Language: English
- Genre: Short story collection
- Publisher: Scribner
- Publication date: August 16, 2022
- Publication place: United States
- Media type: Print
- Pages: 224
- ISBN: 978-1-982145-81-1

Stories from the Tenants Downstairs is a 2022 short story collection by Sidik Fofana, published by Scribner. The collection consists of eight interconnected stories set in Harlem and centered on the residents of Banneker Terrace, a high-rise apartment building facing gentrification and rising rents.

== Reception ==
Publishers Weekly gave the collection a starred review.
