= Mary Ping =

American fashion designer

Mary Ping (born 1978) is an American fashion designer based in New York City. She is best known for her conceptual label "Slow and Steady Wins the Race" (founded in New York in 2001-2), although she has also designed under her own label.

== Biography ==
Ping studied fine art at Vassar College, graduating in 2000. The following year, aged 23, she launched her label. Apart from having attended design courses at the London College of Fashion, and working as an intern with Robert Cary-Williams, she had had little formal training.

In 2004, Mary Ping was one of five winners of the Ecco Domani Fashion Foundation Award. As of 2007 her designs were sold in New York, Los Angeles, and Tokyo. Her bi-annual collections focused upon sportswear designs featuring simple, multi-functional shapes, mix-and-match separates for daywear, and deceptively simple evening wear. In 2008, her work was described as based on postmodern architecture and natural forms, with asymmetrical elements.

In 2007, Ping's work was selected along with designs by Zac Posen, Proenza Schouler, Derek Lam, and Behnaz Sarafpour to represent contemporary sportswear in the Victoria and Albert Museum's New York Fashion Now exhibition. Her alternative label, Slow and Steady, was also featured in the Avant-Garde section of the V&A exhibition. Ping was inducted into the Council of Fashion Designers of America in 2007.

As of 2013, Mary Ping has ceased designing under her own name.

Her work is part of the permanent collections of the Victoria and Albert Museum, Museum at F.I.T., the R.I.S.D. Museum, Deste Foundation, and the Fondation d’entreprise Galeries Lafayette. She is a member of the Council of Fashion Designers of America.

== Slow and Steady Wins the Race ==
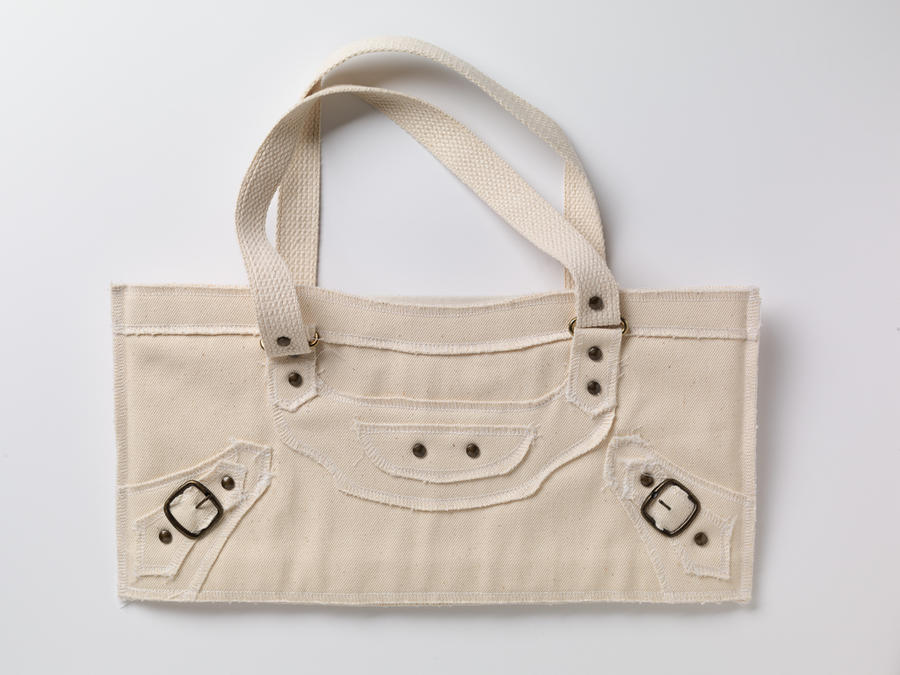
"Balenciaga" bag by Mary Ping, cotton twill & brass, 2007. RISD Museum

At the time of the Victoria and Albert Museum's exhibition in 2007, Slow and Steady Wins the Race was presented as having been founded on the Upper East Side in 2001 by an anonymous 23-year-old creator born in New York. However, Ping was openly linked with the label as early as 2005, and by 2008, was increasingly known as the label's founder. The concept of the label in 2005 was to offer inexpensive, affordable designs in limited numbers (originally 100, but increased to 3500), retailing for less than $100 apiece. Described as anti-consumerist, it was intended to offer designs that challenged the obsolescence of the output of the traditional fashion industry.

One of Slow and Steady Wins the Race's best-known lines was their re-interpretations of It Bags based on designer bags by Balenciaga, Gucci, and Dior among others. Made in calico and reduced to the bare essentials, custom-made designer fittings were replaced by equivalent metalwork from hardware stores.

In 2017, Slow and Steady Wins the Race received Cooper Hewitt's National Design Award for achievements in Fashion Design.

In 2017, Slow and Steady Wins the Race was featured in MoMA's fashion exhibit Items: Is Fashion Modern?, the museum's first fashion exhibit in 70 years.

== See also ==
- Chinese Americans in New York City
