= Yasmin Zaher =

Palestinian journalist and writer

- Born: ياسمين زاهر; 1991 (age 34–35); Jerusalem
- Education: Yale University, The New School
- Occupations: Journalist, Novelist, Thinker
- Writing career
- Notable work: The Coin
- Notable awards: Dylan Thomas Prize

Yasmin Zaher (Arabic: ياسمين زاهر) (born 1991) is a Palestinian journalist and writer. Her debut novel, The Coin won the Dylan Thomas Prize in 2025.

== Early life and education ==
Zaher is from Jerusalem. She has a Bachelor of Science in biomedical engineering from Yale University and a Master of Fine Arts in creative writing from The New School, where she was advised by Katie Kitamura.

== Writing ==
Zaher was previously a journalist for Agence France-Presse and Haaretz, and has also been published in Al-Monitor.

Published July 2024 via Footnote Press (a Bonnier Books UK imprint) and Catapult Books, Zaher's debut novel The Coin is narrated by a Palestinian woman living in New York. Central themes include fashion, luxury, and consumerism, which intensify in a trip to Paris where the protagonist participates in a Birkin bag reselling scheme, as well as dirt and cleanliness. The book has been translated into French, Korean, German, Turkish and Italian.

== Bibliography ==
- Zaher, Yasmin (2024-07-09). The Coin. Catapult. ISBN 978-1-64622-210-0.
