= Ostrich leather =

Material created by tanning ostrich skin

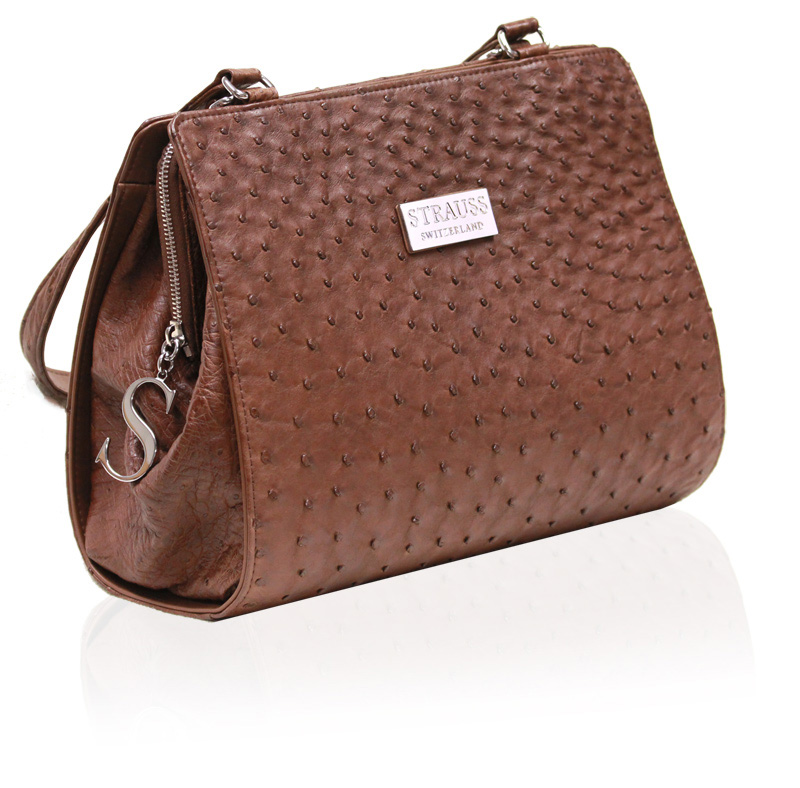
Bag «Classic» Braun.

Ostrich leather is the result of tanning skins taken from African ostriches farmed for their feathers, skin and meat. The leather is distinctive for its pattern of vacant quill follicles, forming bumps ranged across a smooth field in varying densities. It requires an intricate, specialised, and expensive production process making its aesthetic value costly.

Although the first commercial farming began in South Africa in 1850, the industry collapsed after World War I and the drop in demand for the feathers for fashionable hats and military uniforms. Other products were marketed, with each success battered by world events and droughts until now, when ostrich skin is globally available and seen as a luxury item in high-end demand.

Ostrich leather began to be produced after ostrich farming was well established but after a tannery was set up onsite, it went on to make an impact in European haute couture and in the US for cowboy boots becoming widespread during the 1970s. Demand peaked in the 1980s. Availability was artificially limited when ostrich leather was subject to a cartel monopoly through trade sanctions, and single export and distribution channels until the end of apartheid in 1993. After that and other factors, the South African government began to export stock allowing other countries to have their own ranches. Although wider production resulted in competition and lower prices, Klein Karoo Group remains the leading global producer.

There were estimated to be just under 500,000 commercially bred ostriches in the world in 2003, with around 350,000 of these in South Africa. Ostrich leather is regarded as an exotic leather product alongside crocodile, snake, lizard, camel, emu among others. Ostrich skins are the largest in terms of volumes traded in the global exotic skins market.

The premium strain of ostrich is the "African Black", which originated on the ranches of South Africa through various forms of selective breeding.

== General description ==
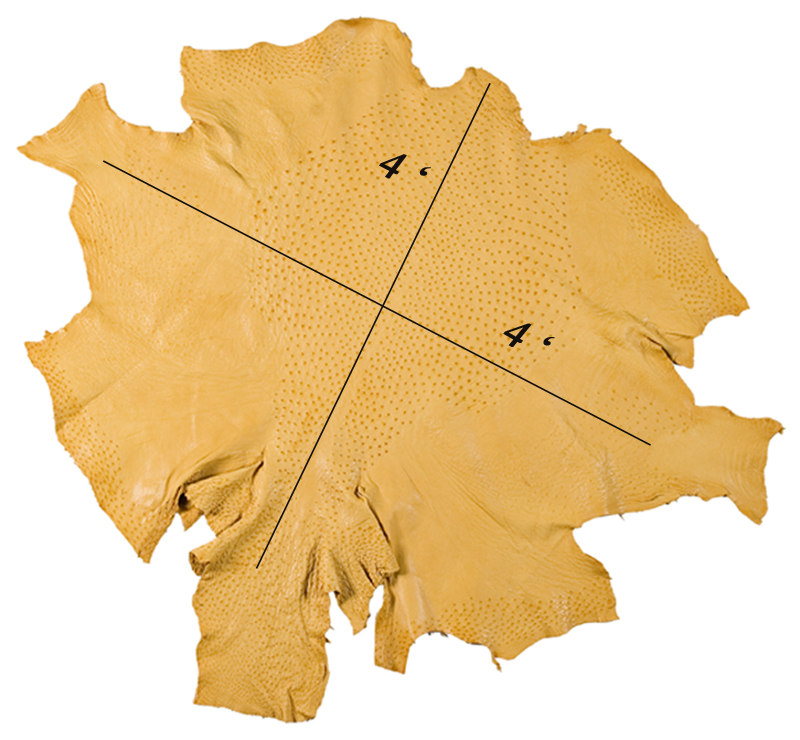
Tanned ostrich hide

Ostrich leather is distinct in its appearance and is characterized by raised points that are localized to the center of the hide. The portion with these bumps is called the "crown". It is actually the back of the ostrich where the animal's neck meets its body. The bumps are quill follicles where a feather grew. On the left and right side of the diamond shaped crown the skin is quite smooth. Only about a third of the whole skin has quill bumps. Since the crown is the most sought-after portion and since it constitutes such a small area of the skin, "full quill" ostrich products are considerably more expensive when compared to bovine leather. This, along with the fact that it is one of the strongest commercial leathers, leads ostrich leather to be seen as a luxury item.

== History ==
=== Feathers ===
The commercial farming of ostriches first began in the 1850s when pioneering farmers located in Oudtshoorn, South Africa, saw great economic potential in harvesting ostrich feathers. Horse-drawn carriages made large, dramatic hats fashionable. Ostrich feathers are some of the most intricate and grandiose in the world so it only made sense to use them in this new rage. During this period of the late 19th and early 20th century, South African ostrich farmers made a fortune. Henry Ford began to mass-produce the automobile which made large stylish hats for women virtually obsolete. The onset of World War I shut down the ostrich feather industry. The same barons who had been making a fortune soon found themselves on the verge of poverty.

=== Klein Karoo cooperative ===
Over the next 50 years the entire industry bottomed out and maintained a minimal presence in the world. This status quo would not last, however. In 1945 the Klein Karoo region near Oudtshoorn set up a cooperative of farmers and speculators ("KKLK") who would work together to rebuild the ostrich industry. Eventually the demand for ostrich meat locally grew to a point where an abattoir was needed. In 1963/64 the world's first ostrich abattoir was erected in Klein Karoo by the KKLK to supply dried and fresh ostrich meat locally.

The marketing of ostrich skin started in 1969/1970 when a leather tannery was built near the abattoir. Prior to this, there was very little known about the tanning process of ostrich skin. Most likely, ostrich skins were sent from the abattoir to tanneries in England and then sold to fashion houses. It appears that a group of South African entrepreneurs set out earlier in the 1960s in search of ways to tan ostrich skin. "I will give anything to see ostrich skins used", said Gerhard Olivier. With Hannes Louw, Jurgens Schoeman and the tanner Johan Wilken, he traveled abroad for the first time in search of people who could tan ostrich leather. Arnold and Dianne de Jager, founders of a tannery in London, offered to train a tanner for Klein Karoo, and in 1970, the first ostrich skin tannery opened there.

=== Cartel ===
Ostrich leather was instantly popular in high fashion throughout Europe and the United States where it was used for cowboy boots. Notably, during the 1980s, demand was extremely high in the United States. During this period, apartheid and other political turmoil caused some countries, the United States included, to put pressure on South Africa in the form of trade sanctions. The ostrich leather purveyors, brothers John G. Mahler and Wilfred Mahler of Dallas, Texas, were the only importers of ostrich skin for many years. Just like the single channel KKLK, who had a virtual monopoly on the exportation of the only viable ostrich skins, the Mahlers were able to control not only prices but also who got skins in the United States and how many they were allowed. The Mahlers' control was so absolute that some bootmakers would be reprimanded by John if they sold his skins to other bootmakers. The arrangement has been compared to the DeBeers diamond cartel.

In 1993 apartheid in South Africa ended. This, combined with several droughts in Klein Karoo that crippled the ostrich industry, forced the South African government to permit the exportation of ostrich stock. This allowed neighboring countries and the US to import and begin raising ostriches. It effectively ended the strong monopoly enjoyed by South Africa and the KKLK. It also ended the Mahlers' monopoly in the United States. More suppliers began to open up in the US and, with fewer trade restrictions, they were able to supply ostrich leather at lower prices. There are several ostrich ranches and tanneries in the US, but with a 150-year head start Klein Karoo Group is still considered the industry leader, and South Africa the centre of ostrich leather production.

== The leather ==
Like other exotic skins, ostrich is a small-area skin compared to bovine and horse hides, and is ranked by the follicles per area since they thin out further away from the neck. It is processed consequently in a more particular way to preserve the largest possible area for processing and treatments, and is put through more than 30 stages related to this. Per unit it is comparable to goat and sheep skins and the range of equipment used is about the same. For this reason, the smaller units, smaller batches, subsequent longer tanning times and skills, increase the cost, elevating it to a luxury product.

Chemical measurements must be precise to avoid mistakes and to not waste resources. Skins are tagged, with production taking time and quality standards being high. Lime is added, removed, and redone after days of processing and expert clipping prevents skins from tangling with each other. Pigmentation is bleached out of the skin, with more and more tanning happening. Mold prevention is added in between this process. A well-finished hide necessarily receives high-quality colours and finishing dyes to industry and market standards.

=== Size ===
The average size of a prepared ostrich skin which can be used with success in most applications is around 16 square feet (1.5 m^{2}). The size and thickness of the skin, as well as follicle development is influenced by maturity of development of the birds at the time of slaughter. This varies depending on production methods.

=== Processing ===
The production process is tabulated in three stages: raw, crust, and finished product. At the first stage, the raw materials are pre-soaked, then cleaned, fleshed and pickled over several times, trimmed, weighed chrome-tanned using chromium sulfate and other chromium salts; and so on, involving 15 steps the last being the "wet blue" product where it is wrung and set out.

The second, or crust stage involves 10 steps, with side trimming and finer cutting, dyeing and drying to produce "crust" leather product. This when it is measured, after drying. The third stage of "finishing" ostrich leather begins with conditioning to soften it, staking, and other applications making eleven steps, including grading, measuring and packing.

Because it is expensive to manufacture all three processes, countries that produce ostrich skins on a smaller scale, export them at the "raw" and "crust" stages. South Africa is an important processor of finished skins for the main leather manufacturers in Japan. Other African countries engaged in ostrich skin processing are Zimbabwe, Namibia, Botswana. Botswana markets directly to South African tanneries.

South African tanneries receives about 200,000 skins a year from the ostrich abattoirs of the region and from elsewhere in the world it receives around 15,000 skins. South African tanneries export around 90% of its finished leather to manufacturers in Europe and East Asia where it is made into gloves, wallets, hand bags, shoes, luggage, upholstery and sports goods. The remaining 10% goes to South African manufacturers of the same range of items.

=== Grading ===
Ostrich skins, like crocodile skins, are graded by the centimetre as they are sold in small measurements.

Grading is required to set producer payment as well as finished leather prices.

- Finished Skins: Tannery for buyer
- Graded Crust: Tannery to pay farmer or buyer purchasing crust skins
- Graded Green: Tannery to pay farmer or trader
- Graded Green: Trader to pay farmer

Note: 1 and 2 use the same standards.

Scars and blemishes currently form the basis for grading with further penalties for poorly developed follicles and skins deemed too small. Definitions of acceptable follicle size and style are vague and often simply a subjective opinion of the tanner or buyer. A defect can be such things as a hole, scratch, loose scab, a healed wound or bacterial damage. The World Ostrich Association has a document with full definitions of defects for each grade.

The World Ostrich Association also have a document entitled "Factors Influencing Skin Quality".

== Uses ==
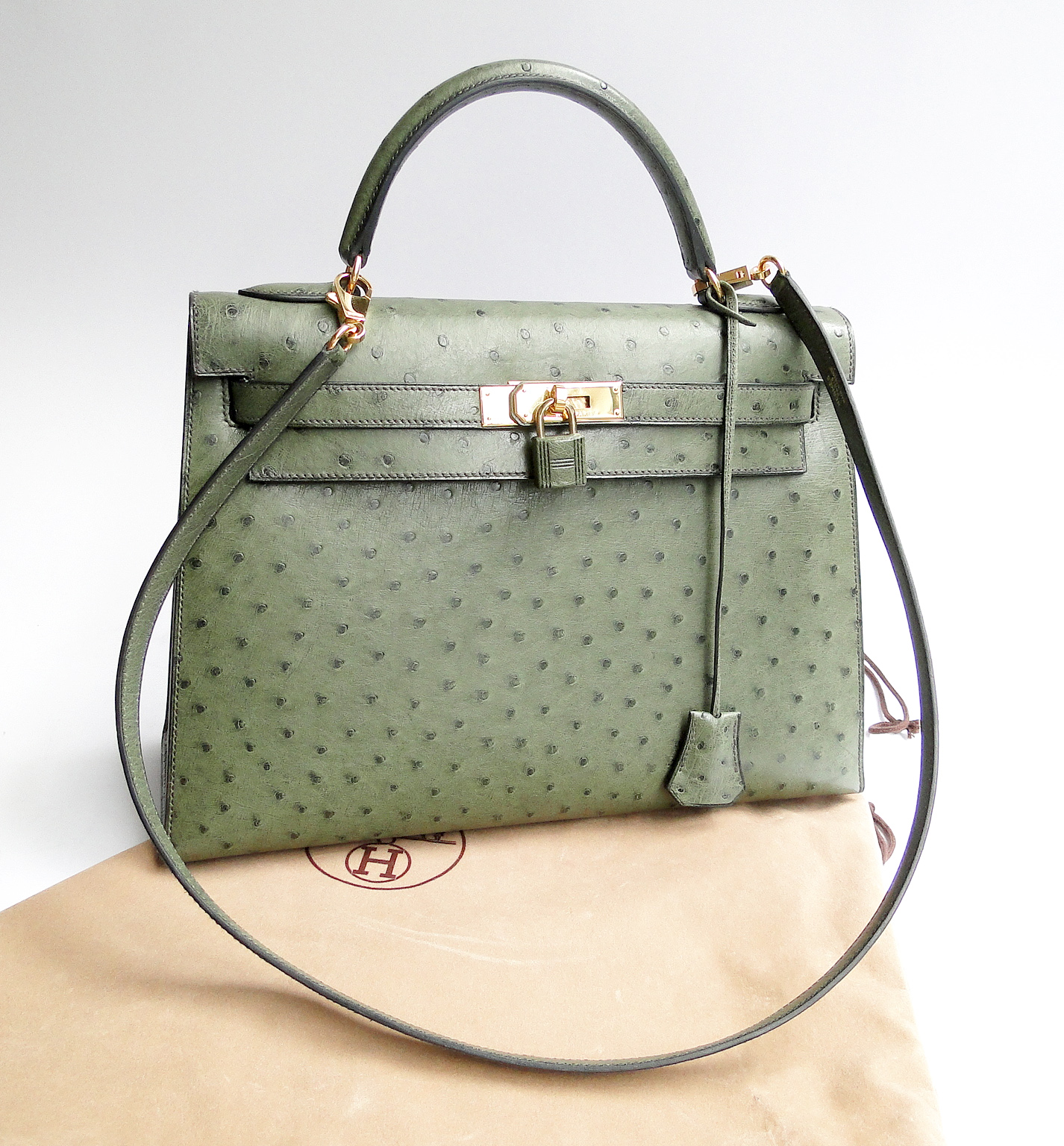
Ostrich leather Kelly bag by Hermès

Traditionally, fashion has driven the demand for ostrich leather. Fashion houses successfully used ostrich leather in handbags for many years. Most designer brands have at least one purse made with ostrich leather. Footwear is another way in which designers showcase the material. By far the most widely-used application is for ostrich leather boots. Just about every bootmaker uses ostrich and the demand for ostrich boots is higher than for any other ostrich leather product. Belts are another major accessory that utilize ostrich leather; most ostrich boots are purchased with a matching ostrich belt. There are other uses for ostrich leather notably shoes, wallets and jackets. Handbags and jackets are the highest priced due to the sheer amount of leather used.

Different geographic regions have different demands for ostrich leather. For instance, Japan has an especially strong market for ladies' handbags while the southern United States has many consumers of ostrich boots.

=== Extended applications ===
Ostrich leather has also made a name for itself within the street and skate cultures, as it has been featured on several skate shoes; most notably the Nike Dunk Low Pro SB "Ostrich."

Aside from fashion designers, the automotive industry is a heavy user of ostrich leather. Car seats, dashboards, motorcycle seats, and door panels can all be covered or accented with ostrich leather. Most after-market car and motorcycle shops can alter seats by applying ostrich leather as seat inserts. Many luxury car manufacturers offer ostrich leather seats from the factory. This practice is especially popular in European countries.

During the 2008 - 2010 ostrich leather started to be used for sporting footwear. Well-known Mexican soccer brands such as Pirma have adopted new range of ostrich leather soccer boots launched during the 2010 FIFA World Cup in South Africa.

== See also ==
- Feather duster
