= Sidik Fofana =

American public school teacher and writer

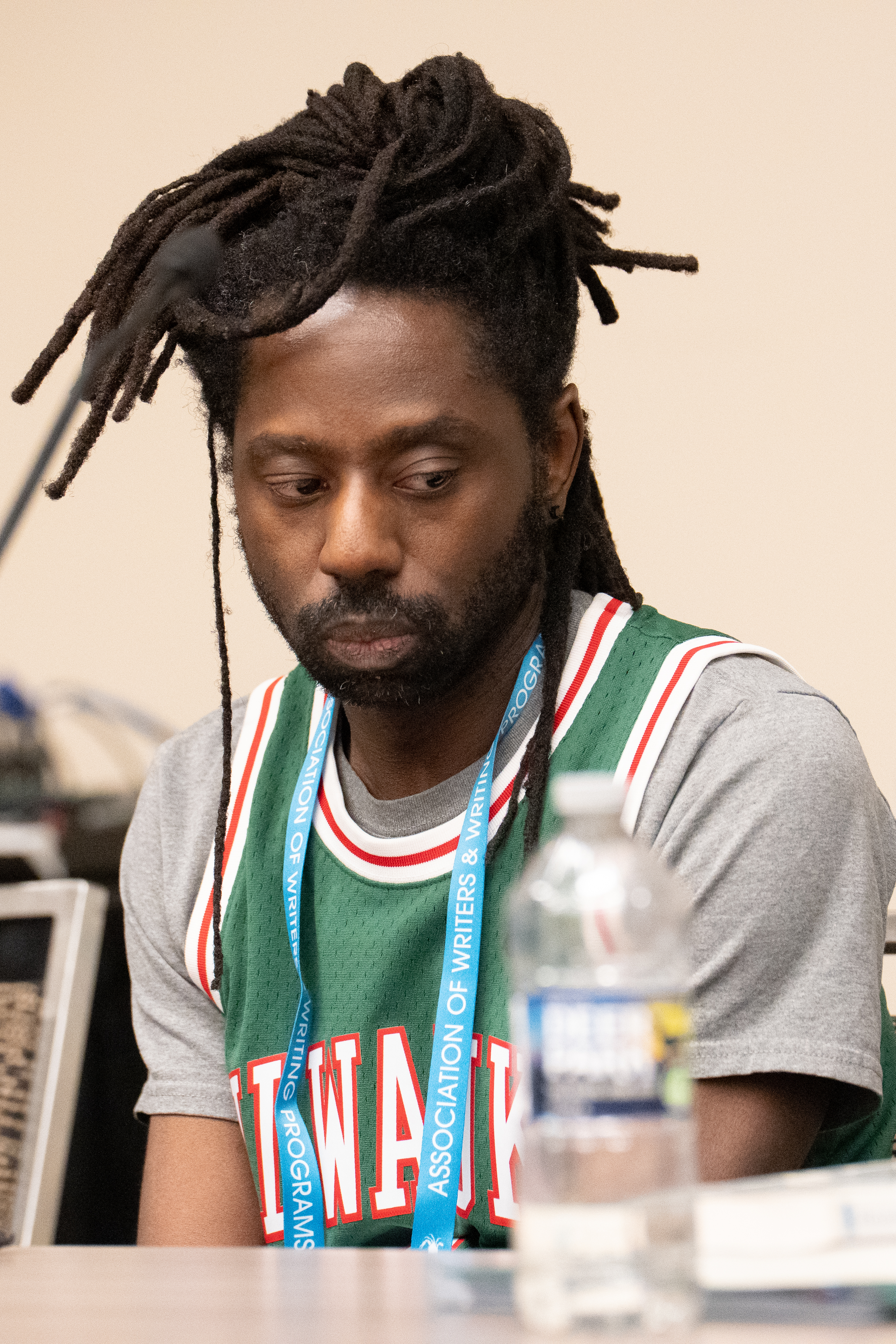
- Fofana at AWP 2026
- Education: Columbia College (BA); New York University (MFA); City College of New York (MA)
- Occupations: novelist, public school teacher
- Writing career
- Notable awards: Whiting Award (2023)

Sidik Fofana is an American public school teacher and writer who is a recipient of the 2023 Whiting Award.

== Biography ==
Fofana graduated from Roxbury Latin School in 2001. He then received his B.A. from Columbia College in 2005 and his MFA from New York University. He also obtained a master's in education from the City College of New York in 2013.

He is the author of Stories from the Tenants Downstairs, a collection of eight short stories about the struggles and inner lives of residents of diverse backgrounds living in a Harlem high-rise who face a rent increase after the building was sold to a corporate real estate company.

Fofana is a public school teacher in Brooklyn, where he has been teaching English language arts and special education since 2007.

Fofana's work has appeared in The Sewanee Review, and he was named editor at large of the journal in 2021. His work has also been published in the British literary magazine Granta.

== Awards ==
Fofana was a finalist for the 2023 Gotham Book Prize and a recipient of a 2023 Whiting Award.

== Bibliography ==
- Stories from the Tenants Downstairs (Scribner, 2022)
