= It bag =

Popular designer handbag

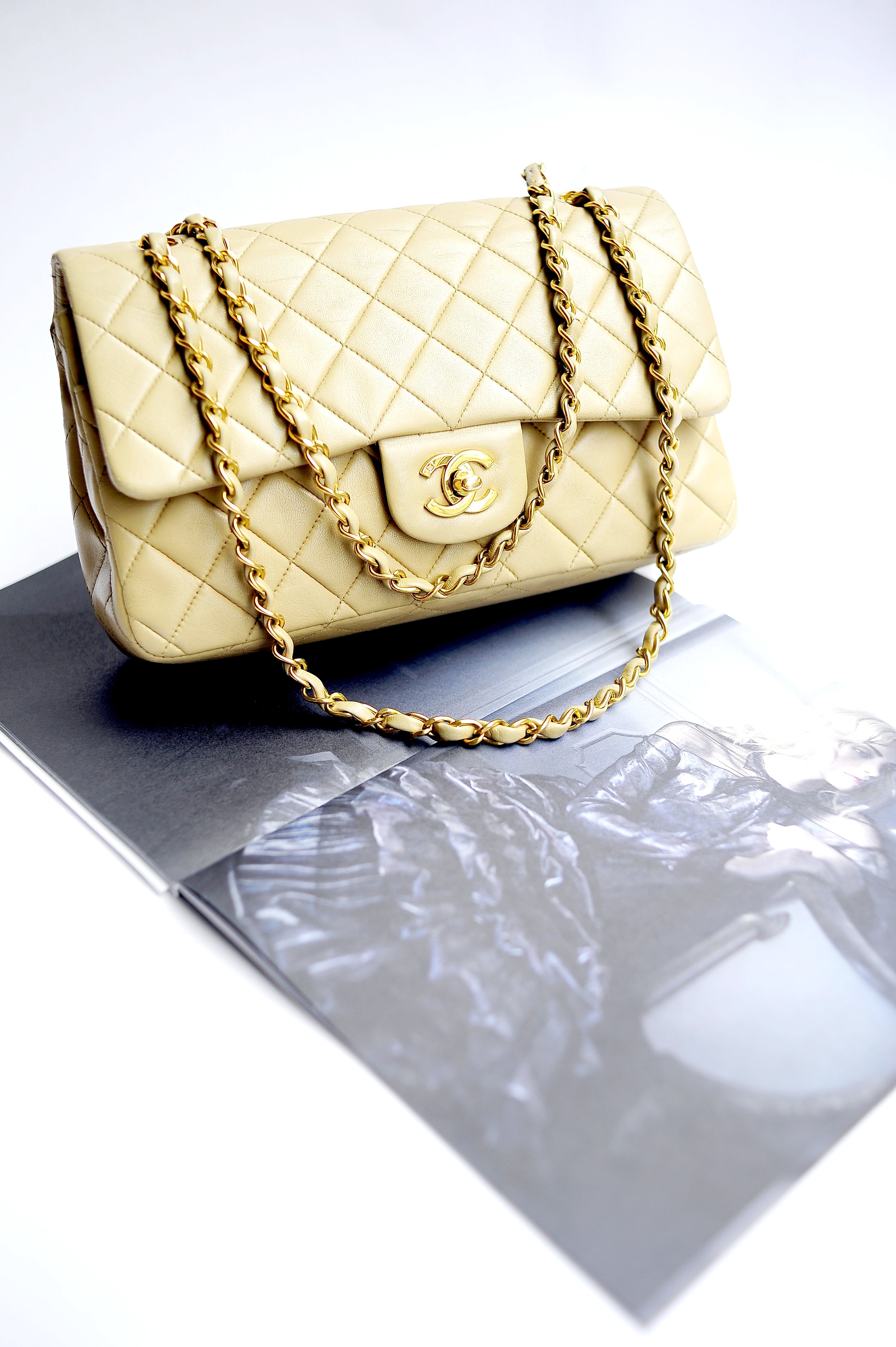
The 2.55 by Chanel

An it bag is a high-priced designer handbag that has become a popular best-seller. The phenomenon arose in the fashion industry and was named in the 1990s and 2000s. Examples of handbag brands that have been considered "it bags" are Chanel, Hermès and Fendi.

== History ==
One of the first designers credited with creating the concept of the easily identifiable "status bag" was Giuliana Camerino, founder in 1945 of the Venetian fashion house Roberta di Camerino. Camerino's handbags were instantly recognisable due to their artisan-made hardware and distinctive use of fabrics formerly reserved for clothing. Her innovations included in 1946, bags patterned with a trellis of R's (foreshadowing Gucci's G's), woven leather bags in 1957 (predating Bottega Veneta) and in 1964, she designed a handbag with a unique articulated frame which was later taken up by Prada.

The fashion houses of Hermès, Chanel and Louis Vuitton created handbags that became famous in their own right well before the concept of the "it bag" took hold. In 1935 Hermès created a top-handled leather bag called a sac à dépêches as part of their leather goods range. In 1956 this design was renamed the Kelly after being prominently worn by Grace Kelly. Coco Chanel first created her quilted-leather 2.55 in February 1955. In 1984, Hermès modified another of their designs, the Haut à Courroies (originally created around 1900) to create a bag for the actress and singer Jane Birkin. The Birkin subsequently became one of the most desirable, widely recognised bags during the 1990s and early 2000s designer bag craze.

The term "it bag" was coined in the 1990s with the explosive growth of the handbag market in fashion. Designers competed to produce a single, easily recognisable design which, if cleverly marketed, endorsed by the fashion press, or seen being carried by a celebrity, would become that season's must-have bag, selling in large numbers. Designers such as Bottega Veneta, Chanel, Fendi, Hermès, Prada, Gucci, and Vuitton continued to be known as creators of desirable bags, rather than enjoying fame for one or two specific models. Among the more successful individual designs created during this time were the Paddington by Chloé, the Motorcycle by Balenciaga, and the Alexa (named for Alexa Chung) by Mulberry. Chloé, in order to enhance the prestige and scarcity of the Paddington, enforced a waiting list for orders, although this led impatient customers to knowingly purchase counterfeit bags. Must-have bags for a particular season were often targeted by criminals and stolen to order, to be sold for significantly reduced prices to people who wanted a fashionable bag without paying full retail. For example, in 2007, the targeted bags were the Lanvin Olga Sac and the Givenchy Bettina, and in 2008, they were the Chanel 2.55 and the Balenciaga Motorcycle.

In the early 2000s, the conceptual New York label Slow and Steady Wins the Race, founded by the Chinese-American designer Mary Ping, offered a range of consciously affordable bags deliberately based on "it bags" by Balenciaga, Dior and Gucci, but made in inexpensive calico with metalwork from hardware stores mirroring the original bags' exclusive designer fittings. These bags were Slow and Steady's way of challenging the concept of consumerism and inbuilt obsolescence in traditional fashion manufacture.

By 2008, the popularity of the "it bag" was reported to be in decline. In May 2011, whilst acknowledging that there would always be customers for expensive status bags, Celia Walden reported that the concept of the must-have "it bag" was no longer in fashion.

In the late 2010s and early 2020s, the phenomenon had a small revival with new styles like Telfar's shopping bags or Bottega Veneta's Cassette purse, as well as re-issues of older "it bag" styles such as the Dior Saddle bag.

== See also ==
- It girl
