= Kelly bag =

Leather handbag by Hermès

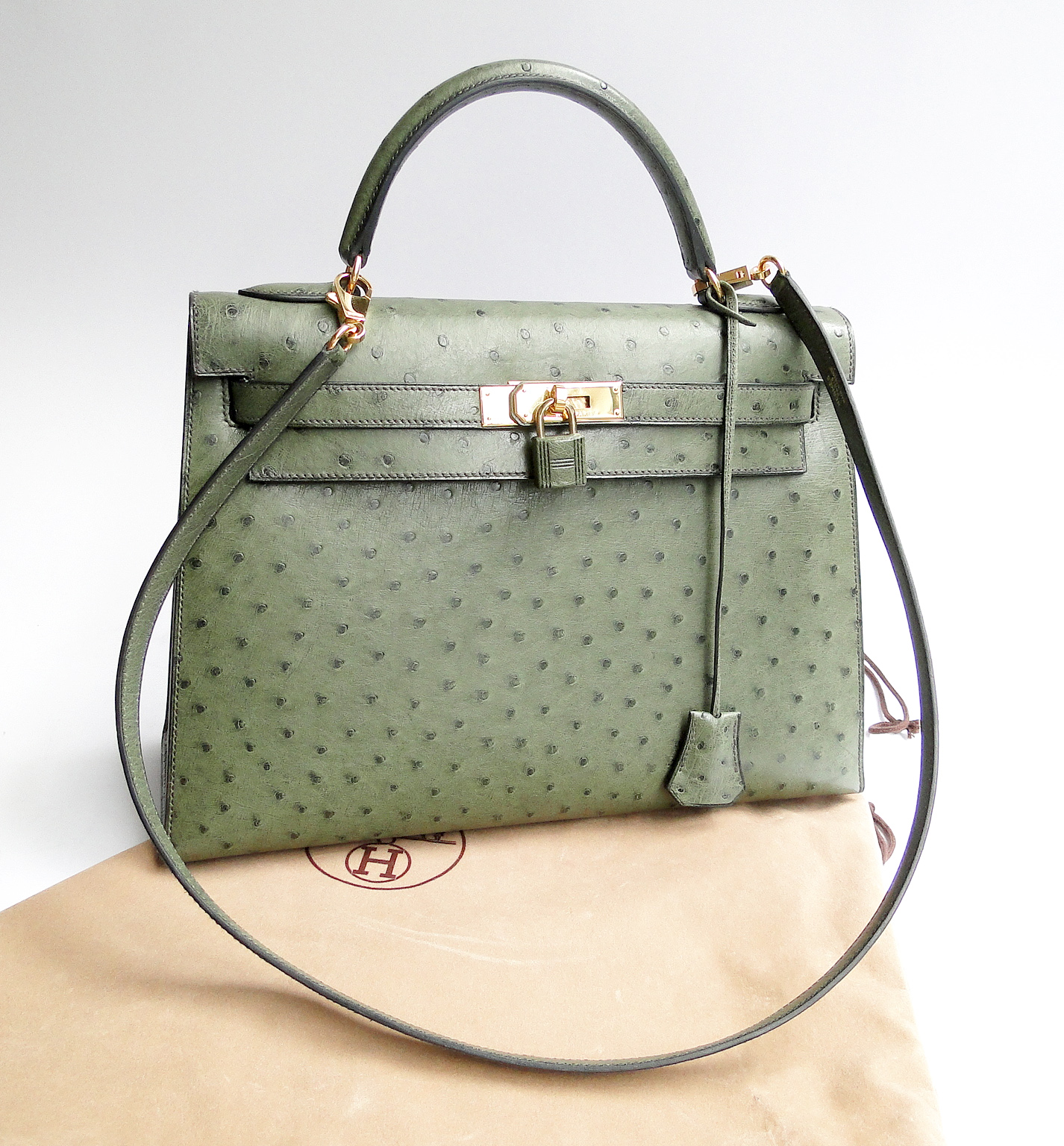
Hermès ostrich Kelly bag

The Kelly bag is a leather handbag created in the 1930s by the company Hermès and named after American actress and Princess of Monaco Grace Kelly. It is one of the brand's iconic products, along with the Carré de soie and the Birkin bag.

The Kelly is affiliated with the Haut à Courroies, a large leather bag for horsemen created by Hermès in the early 20th century. Characterised by its trapezoidal shape and small padlock, it is handmade in the group's French factories. It is created by a single craftsman and can take up to 20 hours to make, which makes it a high-quality, long-lasting piece. It is a highly sought-after product, and sometimes second-hand prices can exceed those of new ones.

== History ==
=== Origins ===
In 1892, Hermès marketed the Haut à courroies, a large leather bag designed to carry a rider's boots and saddle. Its success was immediate and launched the company's reputation in Europe. In 1923, Émile-Maurice Hermès created the Torpedo, which took its name from its trapezoid shape and was later renamed the Bolide. It is a very simple bag designed to be placed in a car door. Its shape follows the curve of a grille, an opening in the coachwork of a car allowing air to pass.

In the 1930s, Robert Dumas, son-in-law of Émile-Maurice Hermès, decided to launch a smaller version aimed at women and suitable for everyday wear. Simple and structured, flexible and solid, it was designed to carry a large number of objects. In 1935, the handbag was launched: even smaller, it could be fitted with a shoulder strap. It was called a Sac à Main de Voyage (travel handbag) as shown in numerous vintage Hermès catalogues prior to the Kelly renaming.

=== Association with Grace Kelly ===
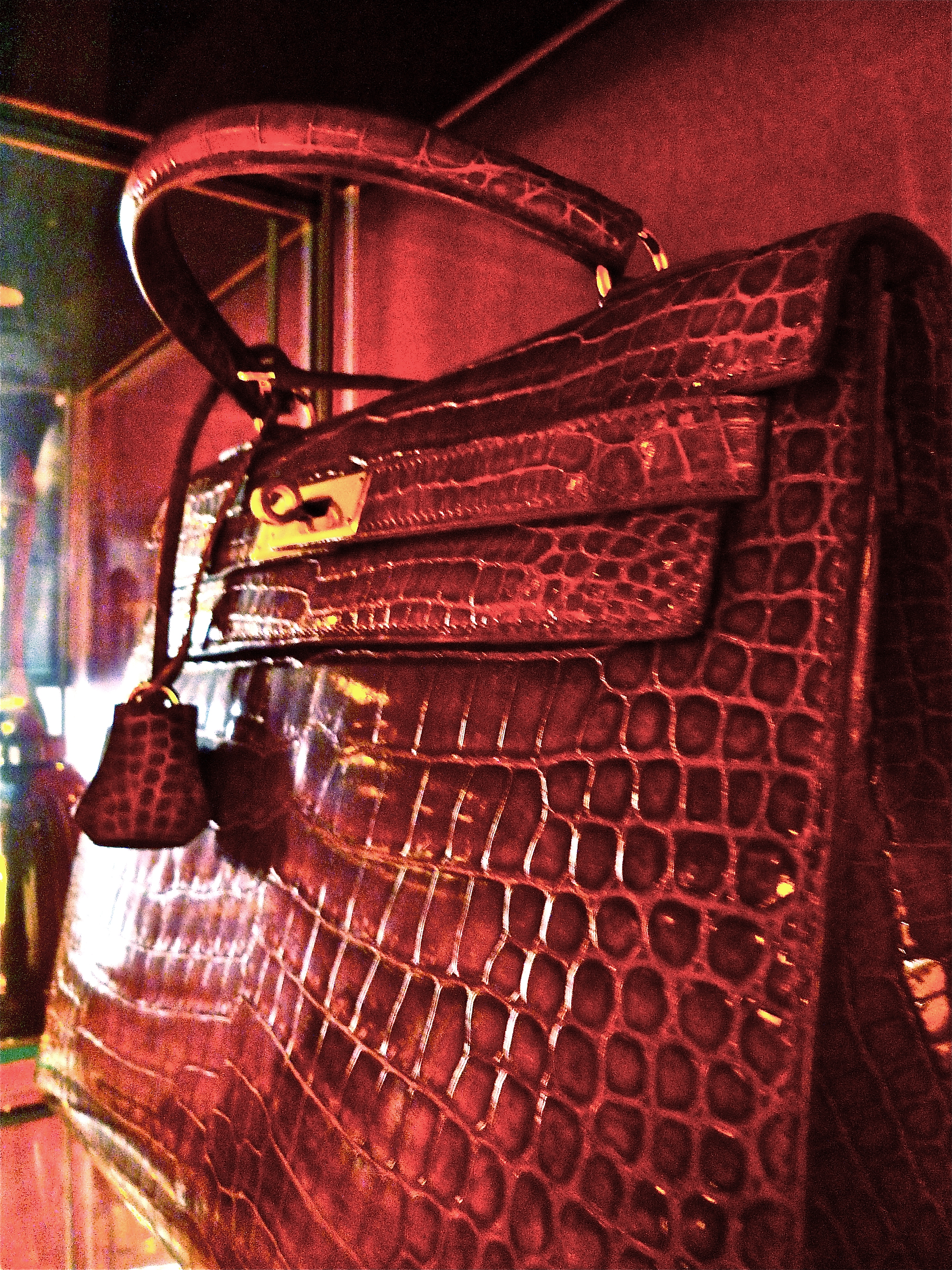
Red crocodile leather Kelly bag

Alfred Hitchcock has been credited with bringing the handbag into the limelight. In 1954, Hitchcock allowed the costume designer Edith Head to purchase Hermès accessories for the film To Catch a Thief, starring Grace Kelly. According to Head, Kelly "fell in love" with the bag.

In 1956, she became Princess of Monaco and was photographed using the handbag to shield her growing belly from the paparazzi, during her first pregnancy with the future Princess Caroline of Monaco, from her marriage to Prince Rainier III. That photograph was featured in Life magazine. It then appeared on many other magazine covers and had a major impact, with many customers pushing the door of Hermès boutiques to ask for the small ladies bag with straps. In the late 1950s, Hermès decided to rename it the Kelly bag.

The handbag with which Princess Grace was photographed was loaned by the palace archives of Monaco and displayed in the Victoria and Albert Museum in April 2010, along with other notable wardrobe items owned by the princess. The "star exhibit" of the show has scuffs and marks, as the wardrobe-thrifty princess carried it for many years. As of 2010, Hermès made 32 styles of handbags, of which the Kelly was the best-seller.

== Design ==
Kelly bags are designed in one of Hermès' 23 French ateliers located throughout the country. For example, there is one in Héricourt in Haute-Saône and another in Louviers in Normandy which, like all the other sites, employ around 250 people. The Kelly takes around 18 to 20 hours to make and is almost entirely handmade by a single craftsman. Each bag is stamped at the end of the process, making it possible to identify the bag, the artisan and determine the date of creation. Hermès leather craftsmen are trained for an average of 18 months, with the Kelly bag being the main focus, as this model concentrates the majority of the know-how required to work in Hermès' workshops.

Available in seven different sizes, from 15 to 50 cm, the Kelly bag features a trapezoid shape and a cut-out flap. It is available in around 20 materials, including ostrich or crocodile leather and around 50 colors. This bag is defined as "simple and impeccably made", with its linen thread saddle stitching, characteristic two-leather strap closure, and small padlock. Its bottom is made up of three layers of leather and protected by four large clous that raise it up so that it doesn't get damaged when it touches the ground.

== Perception ==
Hermès is one of the few brands with iconic pieces, immediately identifiable by a first name, as would also later be the case with the Birkin bag, produced from 1984. The Kelly is nevertheless considered more formal and refined, while the Birkin is more sporty and casual.

Their quality, rarity and notoriety lead to strong growth in their perceived value. The rarity of these bags makes them highly sought-after items on the second-hand market. Some bags, for example, are estimated at auction at over €100,000.

The Kelly has left its mark on the cultural landscape and is regularly mentioned in films and on television. For example, in the film Le Divorce by James Ivory, released in 2003, it plays an important role in the plot: it is the systematic gift from Palou, played by Thierry Lhermitte, the seducer, to all his mistresses. He is even a character in the Bollywood movie Zindagi Na Milegi Dobara.

== See also ==
- Birkin bag
- It bag
- Wedding dress of Grace Kelly
