= Night People: How to Be a DJ in '90s New York City =

2025 memoir by Mark Ronson

- Author: Mark Ronson
- Audio read by: Mark Ronson
- Language: English
- Subject: Memoir
- Publisher: Grand Central Publishing; Hachette Book Group
- Publication date: September 16, 2025
- Media type: Print (hardcover); Digital
- Pages: 256 pages
- ISBN: 978-1538741115

Night People: How to Be a DJ in '90s New York City is a memoir by the British-American music producer and DJ Mark Ronson, released on September 16, 2025. The book was published by Grand Central Publishing, an imprint of the Hachette Book Group.

The book focuses on Ronson's career as a disc-jockey in New York City's club-scene in the 1990s.

The book received positive reviews, including from the Nosheen Iqbal at The Guardian who wrote that in Ronson's memoir "nerdery triumphs over gossip" and further wrote that the book was an "earnest but compelling memoir." The book reached #11 on the New York Times Hardcover Non-Fiction Best Sellers List.

On September 17, 2025, it was announced that Plan B Entertainment had optioned the rights to Night People to become a feature film.
