= Olga Dies Dreaming =

2022 debut novel by Xochitl Gonzalez

- First edition cover
- Author: Xochitl Gonzalez
- Language: English
- Publisher: Flatiron Books
- Publication date: January 4, 2022
- Publication place: United States
- ISBN: 1-250-78617-7

Olga Dies Dreaming is the debut novel of American writer Xochitl Gonzalez. It was published by Flatiron Books in January 2022.

== Writing and development ==
The idea for the novel occurred to Gonzalez on the Q train in New York City while reading the book The Battle for Paradise by Canadian author Naomi Klein and listening to the song "Rican Beach" by Hurray for the Riff Raff. After leaving the train, Gonzalez went to a Starbucks location, where she wrote the basic concept of the plot on a napkin. The book's title alludes to the Pedro Pietri poem "Puerto Rican Obituary".

While writing, Gonzalez eschewed explaining aspects of Puerto Rican culture for a broader audience, drawing inspiration from the "[...] inside baseball" jokes in Paul Beatty's novel The Sellout.

== Critical reception ==
In a review in The Washington Post, Ron Charles wrote, "rarely does a novel, particularly a debut novel, contend so powerfully and so delightfully with such a vast web of personal, cultural, political and even international imperatives." Kirkus Reviews called the book "atmospheric, intelligent, and well informed: an impressive debut." The novel was chosen as a Notable Book by the American Library Association in 2025.

== Adaptation ==
Hulu ordered a pilot for a show based on the novel in early 2021. Gonzalez and Alfonso Gómez-Rejón produced the pilot which starred Aubrey Plaza as Olga and Ramon Rodriguez as her brother, Prieto. The episode was shot, but not released.
