= Anna Akbari =

American author and sociologist

- Education: New York University (BA); The New School (PhD)
- Occupations: Author, entrepreneur, sociologist
- Notable work: There Is No Ethan: How Three Women Uncovered America's Biggest Catfish
- Website: www.annaakbari.com

Anna Akbari is an American author, entrepreneur, and sociologist specializing in the sociology of style and self-presentation.

== Early life and education ==
Akbari grew up in Iowa and studied theater at a performing arts boarding school in Michigan.

== Career ==
Akbari received her B.A. from New York University and her Ph.D. from The New School. She did her doctoral work in visual sociology, studying power dressing and "aspirational identity". She held faculty positions at New York University and Parsons School of Design. Akbari worked in the fashion industry and owned a company called Closet Catharsis which had the slogan "Fashion your identity. Empower your life". She also founded the companies Splice and Bricoler.

In her book Startup Your Life, as Akbari explained in Time, she outlined relationship hacks, including networking in-person, building emotional intelligence, and finding your "minimum viable product" by understanding your core values. Publishers Weekly noted that Akbari's entrepreneurial approach was sound, if sometimes more applicable to business situations than to personal challenges such as healthy eating. In The Enneagram at Work, Akbari proposed applying the Enneagram to your relationships and career.

Akbari's book There Is No Ethan recounts her experience being catfished and working with other victims to expose an alleged New Jersey physician behind a large-scale deception scheme. The New York Times reviewer Katie J. M. Baker described the book as a riveting piece of investigative journalism billed as a memoir, noting that Akbari explores ethical questions regarding aspirational identity and the power of physicians in the epilogue, and concluding that it is "a valiant attempt to hold a manipulator accountable". The gender-bending aspect of the catfishing led Bustle reviewer Arianna Rebolini to recommend it for Pride Month: "this memoir is not LGBTQ but I simply had to mention it".

Akbari worked as a writing supervisor on Alyson Stoner's 2025 memoir.

== Books ==
- There Is No Ethan: How Three Women Uncovered America's Biggest Catfish, Grand Central Publishing, 2024. ISBN 978-1538742198
- The Enneagram at Work: Unlocking the Power of Type to Lead and Succeed (with Jim McPartlin), St. Martin's Press, 2021. ISBN 978-1250777225
- Startup Your Life: Hustle and Hack Your Way To Happiness, St. Martin's Press, 2016. ISBN 978-1250099167
