= Xochitl Gonzalez =

American novelist (born 1977)

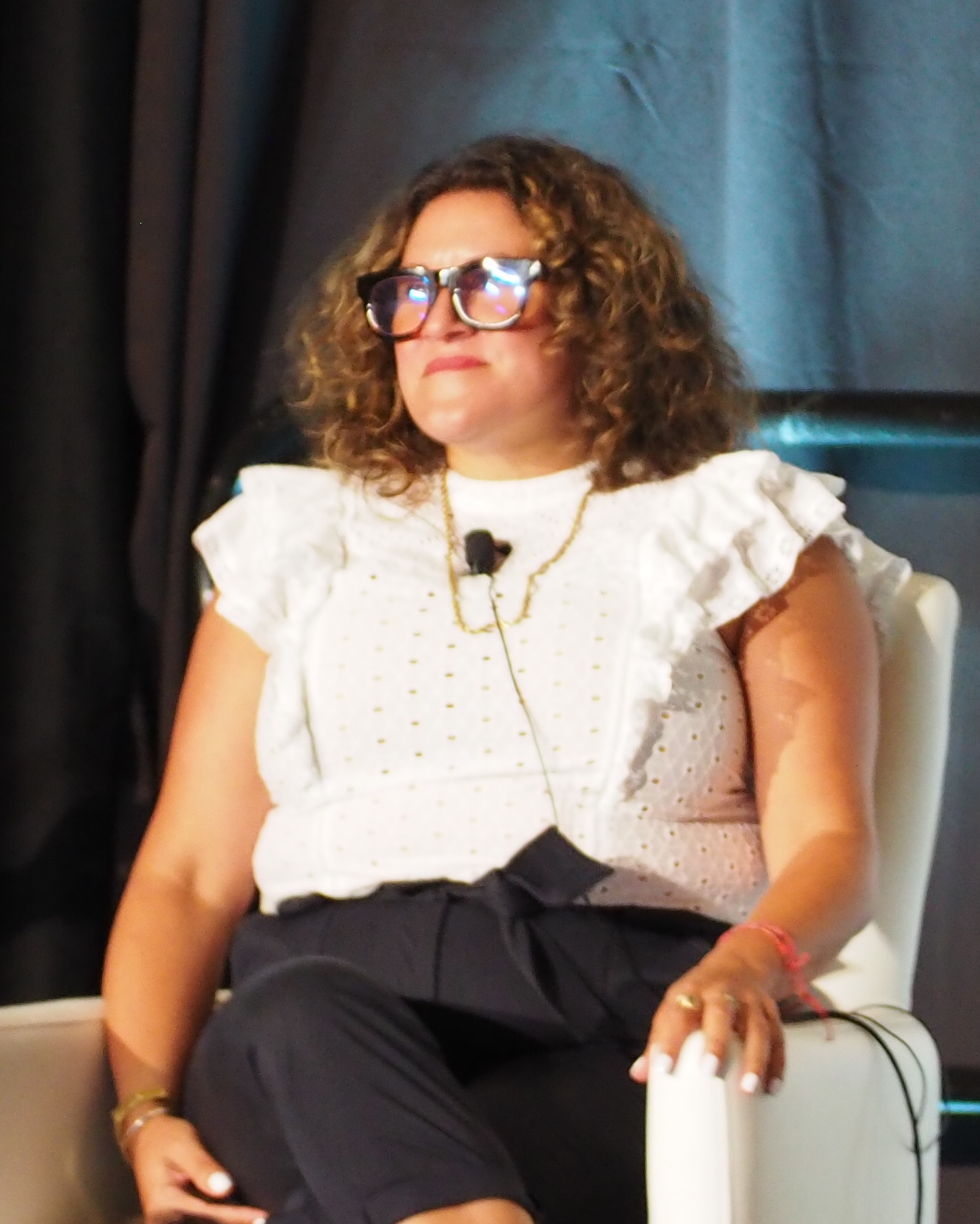
- Gonzalez at the 2022 National Book Festival in Washington D.C.
- Born: 1977 (age 48–49); Brooklyn, New York
- Education: Brown University (BA); Iowa Writers' Workshop (MFA)
- Writing career
- Notable work: Olga Dies Dreaming

Xochitl Gonzalez (/ˈsoʊtʃiːl/, SO-cheel; born in 1977) is an American writer. In 2022, she published her debut novel Olga Dies Dreaming which became a New York Times Best Seller on January 30, 2022. In 2021, she started writing the newsletter "Brooklyn, Everywhere" for The Atlantic. In 2023, she joined The Atlantic as a staff writer, and was a finalist for the Pulitzer Prize for Commentary for her work at the magazine.

== Early life and education ==
Gonzalez was born in New York City to a second-generation Puerto Rican mother and Mexican American father. However she grew up with her grandparents in the area of the city between Bensonhurst and Borough Park in Brooklyn. Her parents were union organizers and activists in the Socialist Workers Party. Her mother ran for office.

Gonzalez attended Edward R. Murrow High School in Brooklyn and earned a scholarship to Brown University in Providence, Rhode Island. At Brown, she intended to study creative writing but wound up majoring in art history. Gonzalez graduated from Brown University with a Bachelor of Arts degree in 1999.

Gonzalez was inspired to become a professional writer after the death of her grandmother in 2017. The sale of her grandmother's home helped fund her writing efforts. She worked as an entrepreneur and consultant for many years before earning her MFA degree from the University of Iowa Writers' Workshop in 2021.

== Career ==
In 2022, Gonzalez published Olga Dies Dreaming, her debut novel. The novel was in part inspired by her past career as a wedding planner for the ultra-rich in New York City after the 2008 recession. The book received a positive review by Ron Charles for The Washington Post and Shannon Melero for Jezebel. Kirkus Reviews called the book "atmospheric, intelligent, and well informed: an impressive debut." Gonzalez wrote and co-executive produced, alongside filmmaker Alfonso Gómez-Rejón, a pilot for a drama based on the novel produced by Hulu. It starried Aubrey Plaza and Ramón Rodríguez. Hulu did not pick up the series.

In 2024, her follow-up novel Anita de Monte Laughs Last was published. NPR said, "Gonzalez's second novel brilliantly surpasses the promise of her popular debut Olga Dies Dreaming." The novel is about a college student, Raquel Toro, discovering the art of Anita de Monte, a character based on the Cuban artist Ana Mendieta. Gonzalez claimed that she visited a location supposedly haunted by Mendieta and was visited by a spirit of the artist, who posthumously encouraged her story to be told. In 2026 she published her third novel Last Night in Brooklyn, a Great Gatsby retelling set in 2007 which became a USA Today national bestseller.

Her highly controversial 2022 essay "Why Do Rich People Love Quiet?" explored the relationship between class and noise and the desire of the wealthy to impose their norm of what is acceptable noise level on others. It inspired a study at the University of Connecticut in Storrs which tracked the movements of Latine and white students on campus to measure their preference for noise. Gonzalez was a 2023 Pulitzer Prize for Commentary finalist for writing the newsletter Brooklyn, Everywhere. In 2025, she coined the phrase "comfort class" referring to "people who were born into lives of financial stability" whose "disconnect from the lives of the majority has expanded to such a chasm that their perspective—and authority—may no longer be relevant." Her nonfiction book, Need Blind: A Memoir of Class & Climbing in America, gathers research on and her experience with social class.

In June 2022, she was elected a trustee of Brown University. She is a trustee at the Brooklyn Public Library. Gonzalez is a 2026 TED Democracy Speaker and Rockefeller Foundation Bellagio Fellow.

== Bibliography ==
=== Novels ===
- —— (2022). Olga Dies Dreaming. Flatiron Books. ISBN 9781250786173.
- —— (2024). Anita de Monte Laughs Last. Flatiron Books. ISBN 9781250786210.
- —— (2026). Last Night in Brooklyn. Flatiron Books. ISBN 9781250372031.
