= Joanne Meyerowitz =

American historian and author

Joanne Meyerowitz is an American historian and author. She was a professor at Indiana University and the University of Cincinnati before becoming editor of The Journal of American History from 1999 to 2004. Following her tenure there, she accepted a position at Yale University, where she was subsequently appointed the Arthur Unobskey Professor of History. Her work has appeared in The American Historical Review, Gender & History, the Journal of Women's History, and the Bulletin of the History of Medicine.

Meyerowitz is a graduate of the University of Chicago and Stanford University. Her book How Sex Changed: A History of Transsexuality in the United States received the Israel Fishman Non-Fiction Award as part of the 2003 Stonewall Book Awards. She has also been awarded a Guggenheim Fellowship, a National Endowment for the Humanities Fellowship, and a Social Science Research Council fellowship. She is a former trustee of the Kinsey Institute.

== Bibliography ==
- Women Adrift: Independent Wage Earners in Chicago, 1880-1930 (1988)
- Not June Cleaver: Women and Gender in Postwar America, 1945-1960 (1994) (as editor)
- How Sex Changed: A History of Transsexuality in the United States (2002)
- History and September 11th (2003)
