= Chanel 2.55 =

Luxury leather handbag

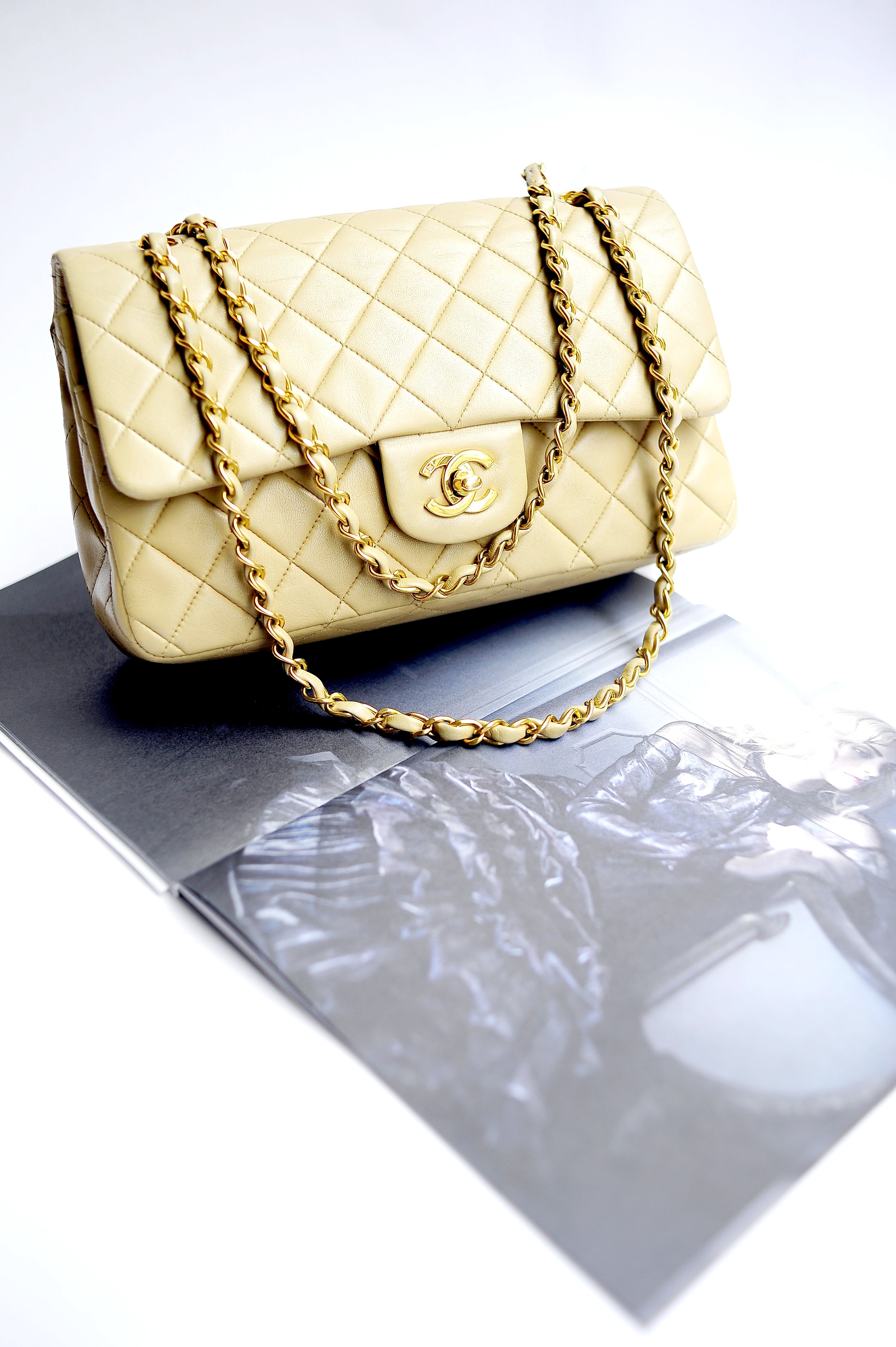
The Chanel Classic Flap

The Chanel 2.55 is a luxury leather handbag or purse designed by Coco Chanel and manufactured by the fashion house of Chanel.

== Origin ==
In the 1920s, Coco Chanel became tired of having to carry her handbags in her arms and decided to design a handbag that freed up her hands. Inspired by the straps found on soldiers' bags she added thin straps and introduced the resulting design to the market in 1929.

After her successful comeback to the fashion industry in 1954, Chanel decided to update her handbag. The resulting design was called 2.55 after the date of creation, February 1955.

== Features ==
The bag has a number of features:

- The lining's burgundy colour represents the colour of the uniforms at the convent where she grew up.
- There is a zippered compartment inside of the front flap. That is where Chanel is rumoured to have stored her love letters in her original bag.
- The backside has a back outside flap for storage of money.
- Chanel, recognising that modern women needed to have their hands free while attending social functions, designed a double-chain shoulder strap. The caretakers of the convent where she grew up held the keys at their waist dangling from the same type of chains as the 2.55 shoulder strap chains.
- The bag originally came with a front lock called "the Mademoiselle Lock" (in reference to Coco Chanel never marrying)
- The bag has a quilted diamond or herringbone pattern on the exterior. Using a running stitch, gives the bag shape and volume. The pattern is believed to have been inspired by several sources: by jockeys' riding coats, by the stained-glass windows of the abbey at Aubazine, as well as by the cushions in Chanel's Paris apartment.

== Variations ==
Since its introduction, there have been several variations of the original design including different colour leather/fabric combinations, metal and interwoven leather straps and the lock, mademoiselle vs. interlocking CC.

Chanel released an exact copy of the original 2.55 in February 2005 in commemoration of the 50th anniversary of the creation of the original. Though the name "Reissue 2.55" should apply only to those commemorative handbags it is now commonly used as a name for all the handbags resembling the original 2.55.

== Pricing ==
Since the 2.55's release in 1955, its pricing has far outpaced inflation. One research study into its price history revealed that price increases between 1955 and 1990 were generally explained by inflation, but there has been a rapid value increase since 1990 and especially 2010. Specifically, its price has increased from $2,850 in 2010 to $5,600 as of 2019 and $10,000 in 2022.

== See also ==
- Dior Saddle bag
