= Birkin bag =

Tote bag made by Hermès

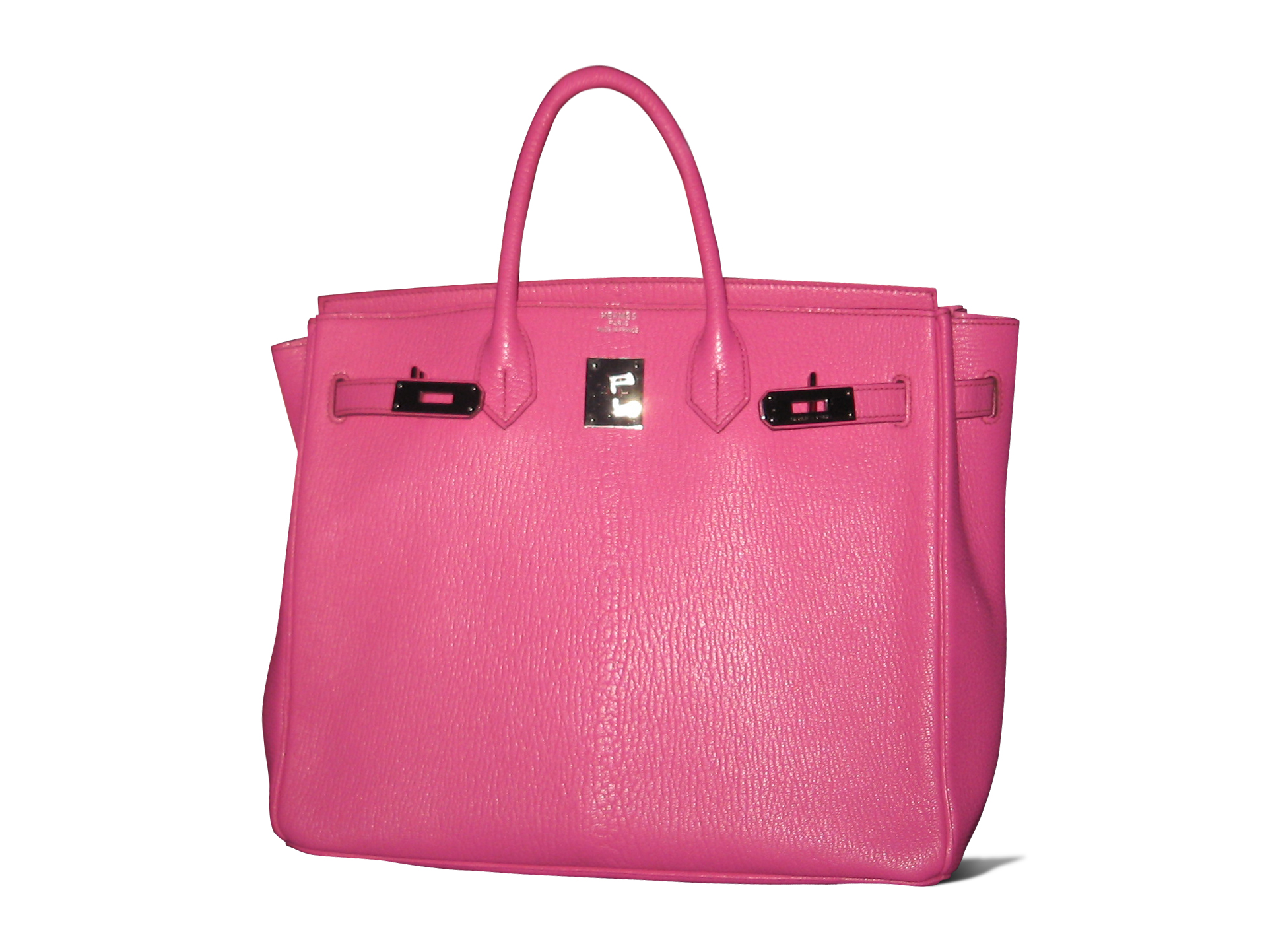
An open, pink, Hermès Birkin bag

The Birkin bag (or simply Birkin) is a handbag created by the French company Hermès in 1984, following a meeting between Jean-Louis Dumas, then CEO of the group, and the actress Jane Birkin. Handmade, usually in leather, it is distributed in several sizes and exclusively in Hermès stores.

Along with the Kelly bag and the carré de soie, the Birkin is one of the brand's iconic products. It has two handles and a more casual look than the Kelly. Each one is made by a single craftsman, usually in one of Hermès' French factories, and requires between 15 and 20 hours' work.

It is widely considered a visual representation of wealth, status, and importance in modern society.

== History ==
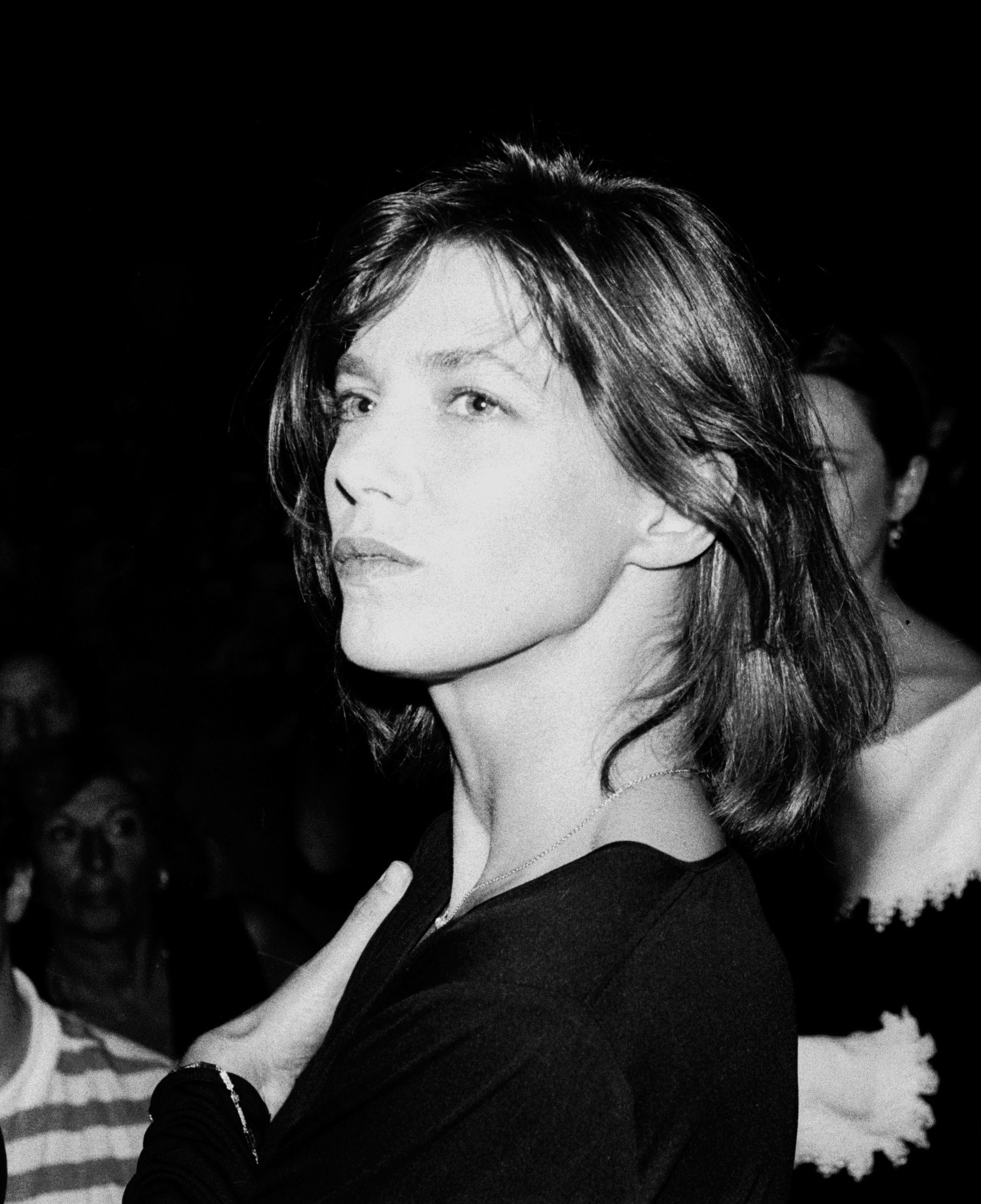
English-French actress and singer Jane Birkin, the eponymous inspiration for the bag

Founded in 1837, Hermès was originally a saddlery and harness maker, producing goods for equitation. The Haut à Courroies was the company's first bag. Made in the early 20th century, it was made for riders at the time to carry their boots and saddle. The Sac à dépêches, designed in 1928, was the first men's briefcase to close with a lock.

The Birkin bag was created in 1984, after a chance meeting between Jean-Louis Dumas, then CEO of Hermès, and Jane Birkin. At the time, the actress was known for carrying baskets that held more belongings than a conventional handbag. She inadvertently spilled the contents of her bag and complained about the impracticality of handbags in general, especially for a young mother, without knowing next to whom she stood. At the time, her youngest daughter, Lou Doillon was two years old, and Birkin wanted a bag big enough to hold both scripts and diapers.

Jean-Louis Dumas suggested she get one with pockets, to which she replied that "Hermès doesn't make pockets". He then exclaimed "but I am Hermès!" Taking advantage of the coincidence, Birkin asked him why the company doesn't offer a bag four times larger than the Kelly. Jean-Louis Dumas immediately drew her up a supple, roomy bag, which he promised to produce and name after her, if she agreed. Birkin said she was very flattered by the proposal, which she accepted.

The first Birkin bag, a supple black leather bag, was created in 1984. Birkin used the bag initially but later changed her mind because she was carrying too many things in it: "What's the use of having a second one?" she said laughingly. "You only need one and that busts your arm; they're bloody heavy. I'm going to have an operation for tendinitis in the shoulder". Nonetheless, Birkin did use the bag for some time. The Birkin bag has, over the years, become a status symbol, with prices ranging from US$10,000 to $500,000.

In July 2015, the animal rights organization PETA denounced the slaughter conditions of the alligators used to make the crocodile skin version of the Birkin bags. Jane Birkin, a signatory of American actor Joaquin Phoenix's “Mercy For Animals” petitions, asked in July 2015 that the company “debaptize” the bag until better manufacturing practices meeting international standards could be put in place. In September, the actress announced that she was satisfied with the measures taken by Hermès to promote the welfare of its farm animals. The bag kept its name after Hermès announced it had corrected the slaughter system on the farms in question and introduced sanctions in the event of a repeat offense.

== Crafting and design ==
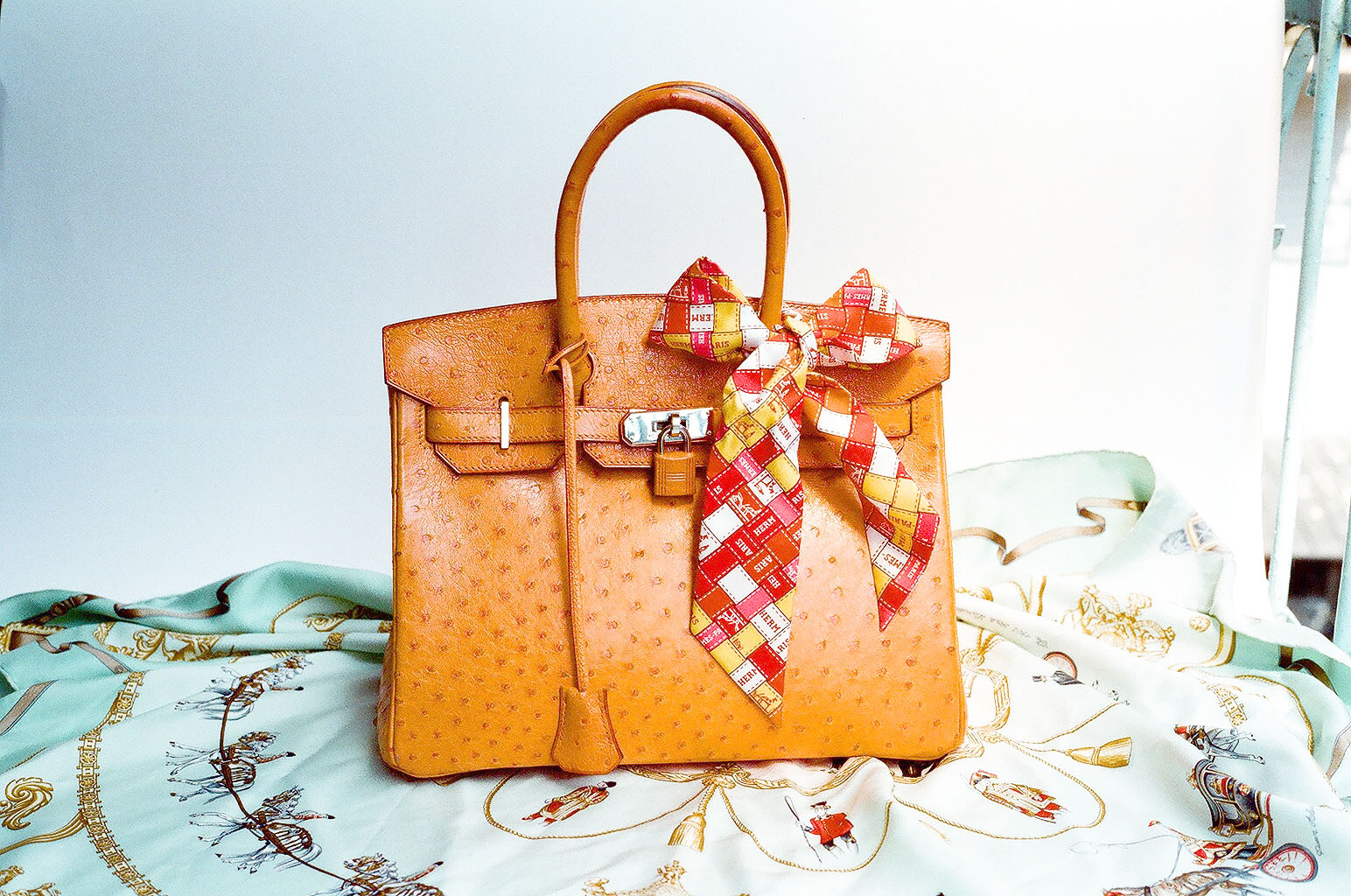
Hermès Ostrich Birkin bag with matching leather-covered lock and key lanyard, displayed with a plaid bow

The Birkin bag is made exclusively in France in factories located throughout the country, such as Seloncourt in Franche-Comté or Montbron in Charente. It is sold in a range of sizes and colors. It is always made by a single craftsman, who affixes his signature to each bag for which he is responsible. The company's signature saddle stitching, developed in the 1800s, is used in the bag construction. Hermès employs around 250 craftsmen to make Birkin bags in more than twenty factories and workshops. Hermès maintains these jobs to preserve the knowledge that goes into making the bags. This is also why the company trains some of the craftsmen in-house, providing a year and a half of instruction and several years of practice to teach them to make bags like the Kelly or the Birkin. The difference between the Birkin and the Kelly is that the Birkin is a large tote bag distinguished by its two handles and polished wedge shape. It is a less structured bag in its design, giving it a more casual look compared to the Kelly, which is more classic and formal. Initially designed in supple black leather, it has since been made available in several sizes and different materials. The bag comes in a variety of hides, such as calfskin, lizard, and ostrich. Among the most expensive materials is saltwater crocodile skin, with small scale patterns being rarer than large ones. Each bag is fully lined with goatskin leather of the same color as the outer leather. The Birkin can be recognized by its clasp, which features a padlock and key bell. The company justifies the cost of the Birkin bag compared to other bags because of the degree of skill involved in its creation. Prices for the Birkin bag depend on the type of material, color, and hardware fixtures. Detailing with diamonds is another custom option.

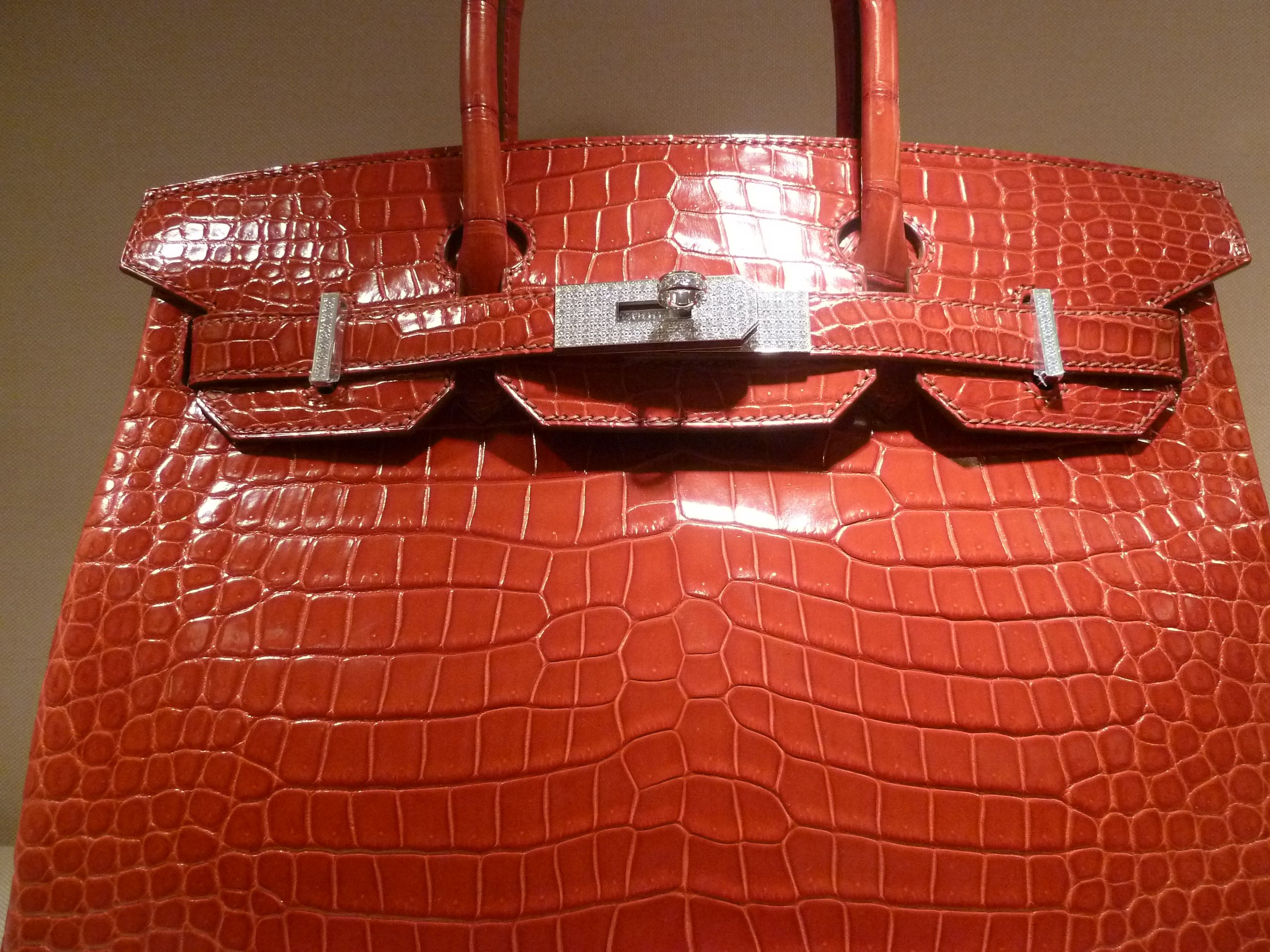
Hermès red crocodile-skin Birkin bag

According to a 2014 estimate, Hermès produced 70,000 Birkin bags that year. The bag is highly coveted, and as of 2006 was reputed to have a waiting list of up to six years. The rarity of these bags is purportedly to increase demand by collectors. According to an analyst quoted by The New York Times in 2019, there are more than one million Birkin bags on the market, while a resale boutique in Miami has sold more than US$60 million worth of used Birkin bags in five years. In 2020, retail prices started at US$11,400 for a Birkin 25 bag.

The Birkin Faubourg is a limited-edition version of the Birkin created in 2019. The Faubourg, measuring 20 cm in width, is a three-dimensional architectural tribute to Hermès's historic headquarters located at 24 rue du Faubourg Saint-Honoré in Paris. According to Sotheby’s, the Birkin Faubourg has become one of the most coveted handbags in the world, surpassing the legendary Birkin Himalaya in both desirability and secondary market value.

As part of the expansion of the collection Hermès Birkin Styling launches limited collections of styled Birkin bags, inspired by iconic Paris addresses. In 2026, a new launch is planned for the Faubourg collection, which will present a contemporary interpretation of the series with expansion of the size range and new color palettes.

The upcoming Birkin 30 cm collection will include six exclusive color variations: Black (Noir), Etoupe Togo, Chalk (Craie) Togo, Rose Sakura, Pewter (Étain) Togo and Gold (Or) Togo. Each bag will be complemented by the characteristic architectural design featuring three windows, this time reproducing the iconic Avenue George V building in Paris.

== Perception ==
The Birkin bag is one of the brand's iconic products, along with the Kelly bag and the carré de soie. The bag is highly coveted and, like the Kelly bag, is often resold for a higher price than the original. The rarest have fetched several hundred thousand euros at auction. In June 2015, the Diamond Birkin 35 in shiny fuchsia porosus crocodile became the world's most expensive Hermès bag when it was sold for €202,000 at an auction organized by Christie's in Hong Kong. This was due to demand far outstripping supply, as Hermès is unable to produce bags, all of which are handmade, in sufficient numbers. This shortage has led some to suggest that Hermès is artificially limiting the sale of its bags in order to increase their perceived value, although these allegations have never been proven. The alleged need to purchase other items from Hermès and supporting commission structure for sales associates is the basis of a 2024 California anti-trust lawsuit.

However, the bag quickly became a symbol of wealth and exclusivity due to its high price and assumed long waiting lists. Birkins are a popular item with handbag collectors, and were once seen as the rarest handbag in the world. Because the bag's value is a matter of its intentionally high price, it has been described as a Veblen good. As a result of strong demand, the Birkin bag has a high resale value in many countries, especially in Asia, and is considered by some people to be an instrument of investment. One 2016 study found that Birkin bags had average annual returns of 14.2% between 1984 and 2015, significantly beating the S&P 500 Index in returns over the same period. In April 2010, Hermès announced that the waiting list would no longer exist, implying that these bags are potentially available to the general public.

The Philippine Star reported in March 2013, that a high-end, 30-cm Shiny Rouge H Porosus Crocodile Birkin with 18-carat gold fittings and encrusted with diamonds was sold for US$203,150 at an auction in Dallas, Texas, US. In May 2017, a 30-centimetre (12") matte white Himalaya niloticus crocodile Birkin with 18-carat white gold and hardware bearing 245 diamonds was sold at a Christie's auction in Hong Kong for HK$2.94 million (US$377,261), creating a new record for the most expensive handbag in the world. The original prototype Hermès Birkin handbag, custom-made for Jane Birkin with a shoulder strap, brass fittings, and other differences from later production bags, was sold at auction for €8.6 million (approximately $10.1 million), setting a new record as the highest price for a Birkin bag and the most expensive fashion accessory sold at auction in Europe.

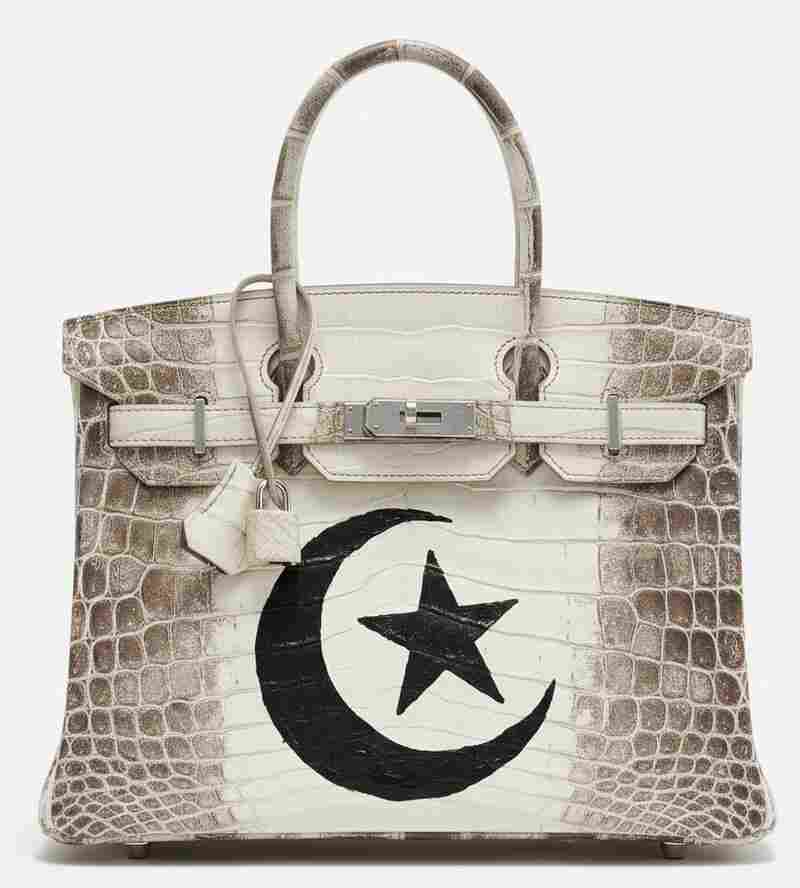
disgust (2025) by Raimo D. Nagel, exhibited in Basel

In contemporary art, the Birkin has been used by artists as a symbol of luxury, status, and social commentary. Notable examples include Raimo D. Nagel, whose work disgust features a Hermès Birkin Himalaya painted with a black Hilal and a five-pointed star, turning the bag into a “projection surface onto which social meanings such as power, religion, and ideology can be mapped.” Other artists who have incorporated Birkin bags into their work include Alec Monopoly, who creates hand-painted bags with graffiti motifs, and Sanuj Birla, whose Birkin Drip sculpture depicts a melting Birkin to comment on consumer culture.

Public demand for the Birkin is rising as a 2025 report by secondhand retailer ReBag suggested a 92% appreciation of its value over the last decade.

== Counterfeits ==
In addition to the possible counterfeits that all well-known brands are subject to, fake Hermès bags—including the Birkin bag—are alleged to have been made by a group including seven former Hermès workers. Ten people were sentenced in France to sentences ranging from six months' imprisonment (suspended) to three years, plus fines, in September 2020 for making dozens of counterfeit bags that sold for tens of thousands of euros each, for a total profit of over €2 million. The crime was discovered by police investigating unrelated stolen products. Four of those on trial were skilled leatherworkers who made the bags using Hermès stitching methods. The counterfeiters imported crocodile skins. Leather offcuts, tools, zips, and faulty bags that were to be destroyed had been stolen from Hermès.

Other crimes involving counterfeit bags, and claims to supply genuine bags, have been committed. In 2024 Walmart.com started retailing similar-looking bags priced between $78 and $102 branded KAMUGO and Aidrani. Fashion influencers nicknamed the bags "Wirkin" on social media after they went viral in TikTok unboxing videos. The bags were not available in physical Walmart stores but rather were sold online through Walmart.com by third-party companies including Kamugo and BESTSPR, and were removed from Walmart's website in early 2025.

== See also ==
- Conspicuous consumption
- Economic materialism
- It bag
- Kelly bag
- Social prestige
