= Haversack =

Bag with a single shoulder strap

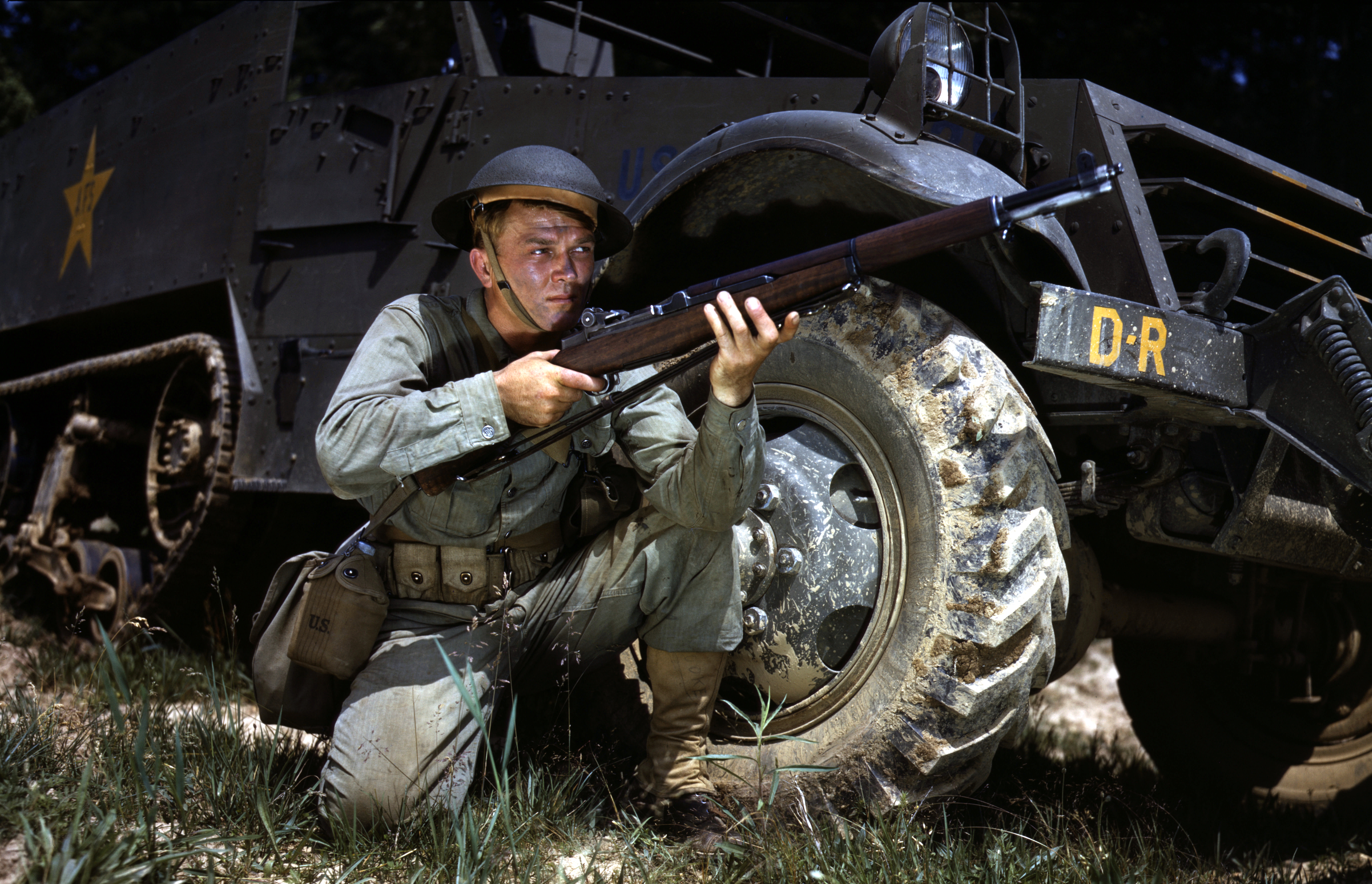
World War II-era American infantryman with a haversack at his hip hanging from a shoulder strap

A haversack, musette bag, or small pack is a bag with a single shoulder strap. Although similar to a backpack, the single shoulder strap differentiates this type from other backpacks. There are exceptions to this general rule.

== Origins ==
The word haversack is an adaptation of the German Hafersack and also the Dutch haverzak meaning "oat sack", (which more properly describes a small cloth bag on a strap worn over one shoulder and originally referred to the bag of oats carried as horse fodder). The term was adopted by both the English and French (as havresac) cavalry in the 17th century. The word haver likewise means "oats" in Northern English and Scottish dialects.

The haversack, especially when used in the military, was generally square and about 12 inches (30 cm) per side with a button-down flap to close it. When empty, the bag could be folded in three and an extra button on the back of the bag would allow it to be refixed in this position. For the military, this made it neat and, when held to the side in its folded form by the soldier's belt, it became part of the uniform of many regiments in the British army.

During the American Revolutionary War, soldiers used haversacks to carry their individual food rations for the day, when the mission did not call for a full rucksack.

== Commonwealth usage ==
In Australia, India and other commonwealth countries in South Asia the word haversack is synonymous with rucksack or other similar terms and is casually used to describe any big backpack.

== U.S. Army ==
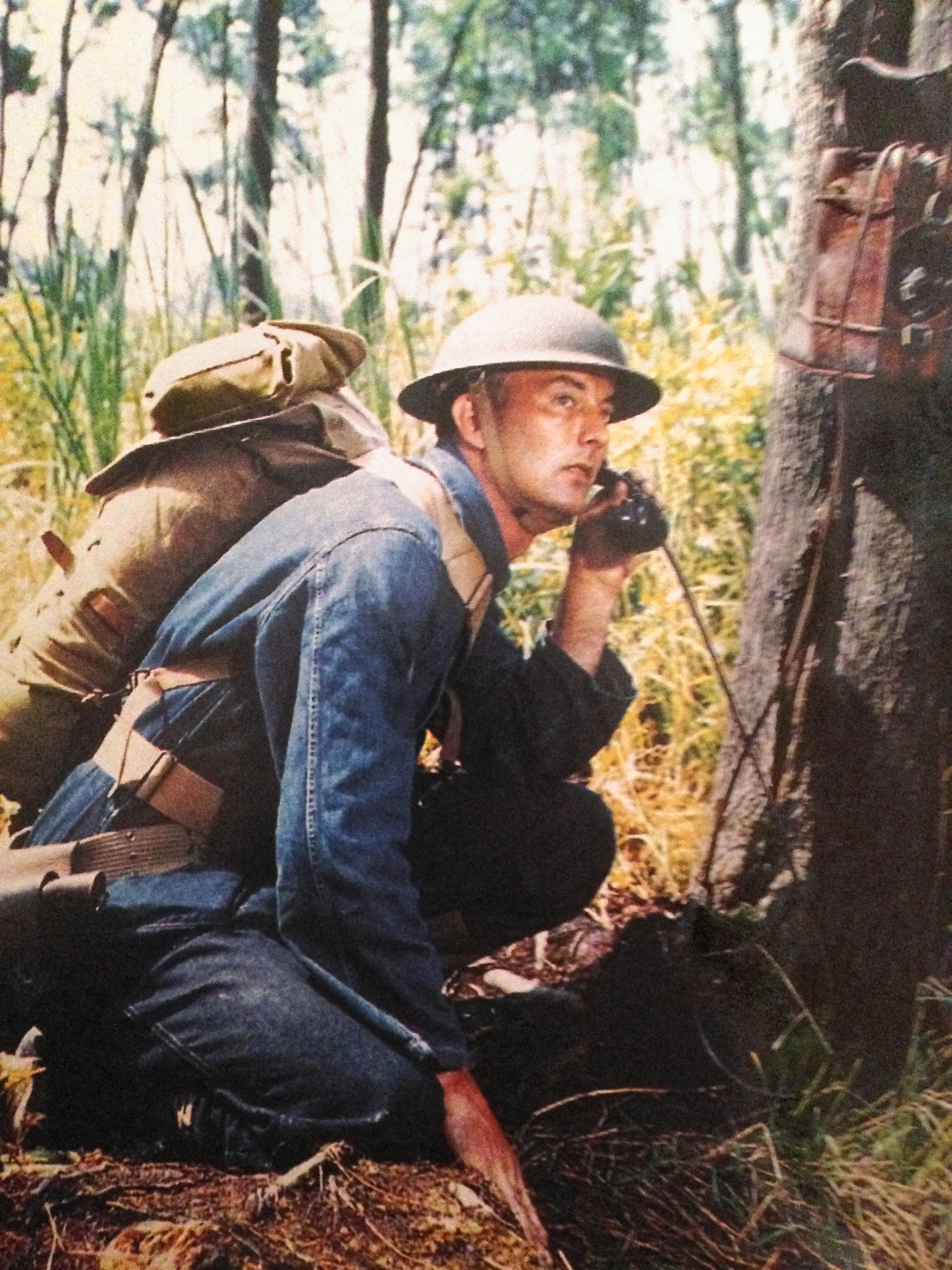
Wearing the full M-1928 (M28) infantry haversack, this US soldier wears the old style blue denim fatigues.

Haversacks were in use during the American Civil War, as is recounted in Ulysses Grant's memoirs: "In addition to the supplies transported by boat, the men were to carry forty rounds of ammunition in the cartridge-boxes and four days' rations in haversacks."

In 1910, the U.S. Army adopted the M1910 haversack as the standard pack for all infantrymen. The pack is essentially a sheet of canvas that folds around its contents (clothing, daily rations, and assorted personal items), and is held together by adjustable straps that thread through loops. A "tail" threaded onto the bottom of the haversack with a leather strap is intended to hold the bedroll and can be detached from the haversack without disturbing the contents of the pack. Shoulder straps and a single rear strap are designed to attach to a cartridge belt in a suspender configuration. The exterior of the pack has grommets for attaching a bayonet scabbard, a mess kit pouch, and a canvas carrier for a short-handled shovel (entrenching tool).

The M1910 haversack continued production during the interwar years with minor modifications: "An upgraded haversack was developed in 1928 that had quick release buckles and a web strap and buckle closure on the meat can pouch replacing the metal button. However, the M-1928 haversack did not go into production until 1940, and older haversacks continued to be issued until stocks were exhausted." The M-1944 Combat Pack was developed from the much lighter and user-friendly US Marine Corps M-1941 Jungle pack which was developed during the Banana Wars which required a lighter pack in the tropics. The M-1944 pack had some shortcomings and a new M-1945 began replacing earlier packs in February 1945. The two packs had incompatible combat and cargo packs because of different release buckles.

The new two-part design, based on the Marine M-1941 jungle pack, used a much smaller back pack (for rations, clothes, ammunition, and messkit), and a separate cargo bag that attached to the bottom for extra clothes, shoes, and miscellaneous other items. The upper field pack had the same type of grommet tabs and loops as the M-1928 for attaching a bayonet and entrenchment tool plus straps for securing a "horseshoe" bedroll.

The M-1936 field bag was a copy of the British officer's Musette bag of World War I and was issued to officers, engineers and mounted personnel. It was a smaller pack lacking shoulder straps and could be attached to a set of cotton web suspenders or carried by a single general purpose shoulder strap. It was intended to carry rations, mess gear, and other essential items and was smaller as less essential gear would be carried on a vehicle.

== U.S. Marine Corps ==
The Marines carried the M-1910 haversack and the somewhat-improved M-1928 haversack in both world wars, but they also developed their own exclusive pack system in 1941. The M-1910 haversack was considered too overweight and cumbersome for jungle fighting in the tropics of Central America during the years of the Banana Wars.

A more versatile two-part M-1941 system was devised. It has an upper "marching pack" for rations, poncho and clothes, and a lower knapsack for extra shoes and utilities. The exterior of the upper pack had loops and grommet tabs for attaching a bayonet, shovel, bedroll, extra canteen, and first-aid pouch. It was issued in tan or khaki canvas.

== See also ==
- Messenger bag
- Hunting bag
