= Arriero =

Person in Spain and South America that leads mule trains

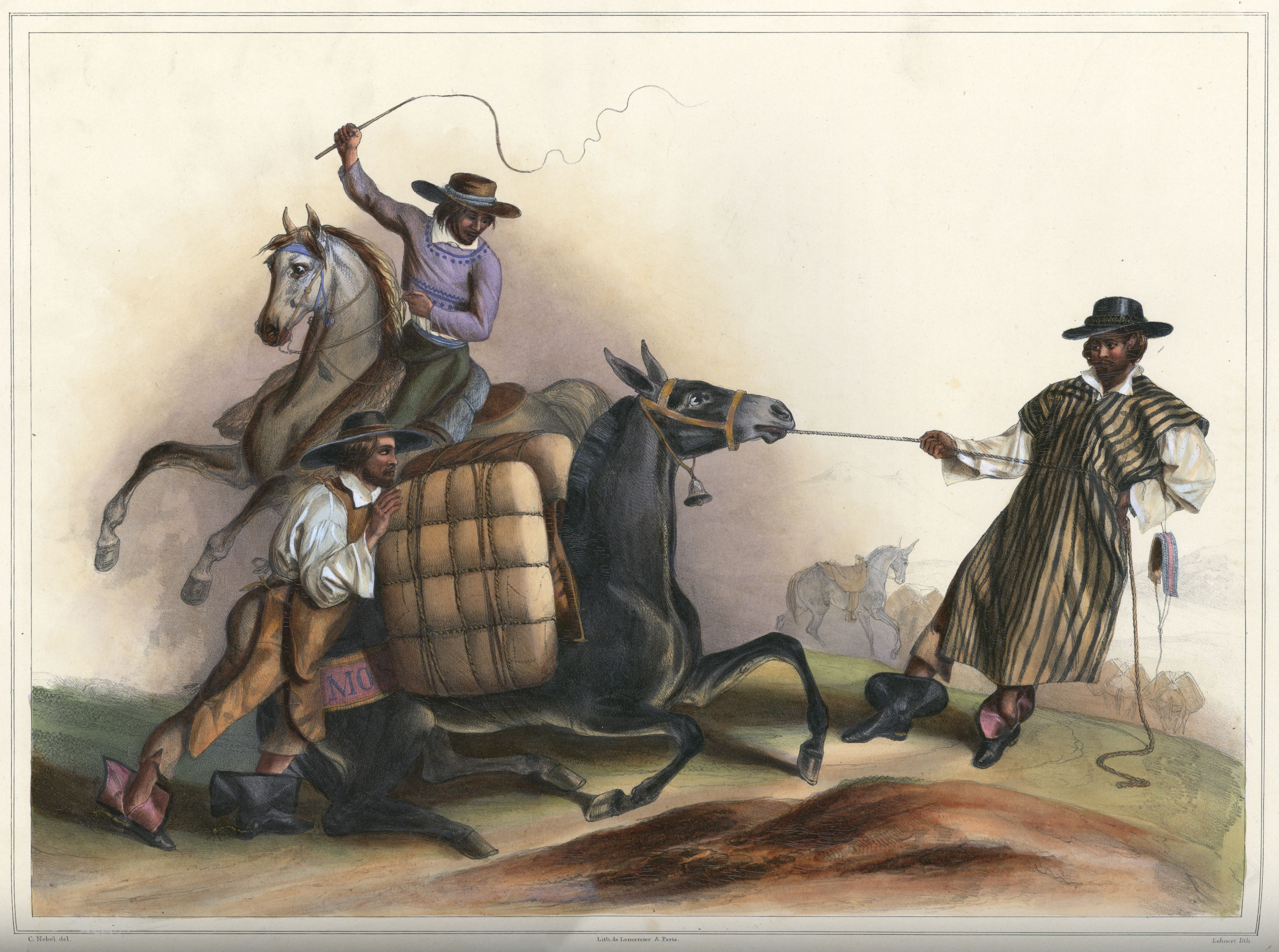
Arrieros (1836) by Carl Nebel; three Mexican muleteers attempting to move a heavily loaded mule

An arriero, muleteer, or more informally a muleskinner (Spanish: arriero; Portuguese: tropeiro;) is a person who transports goods using pack animals, especially mules.

== Distribution and function ==
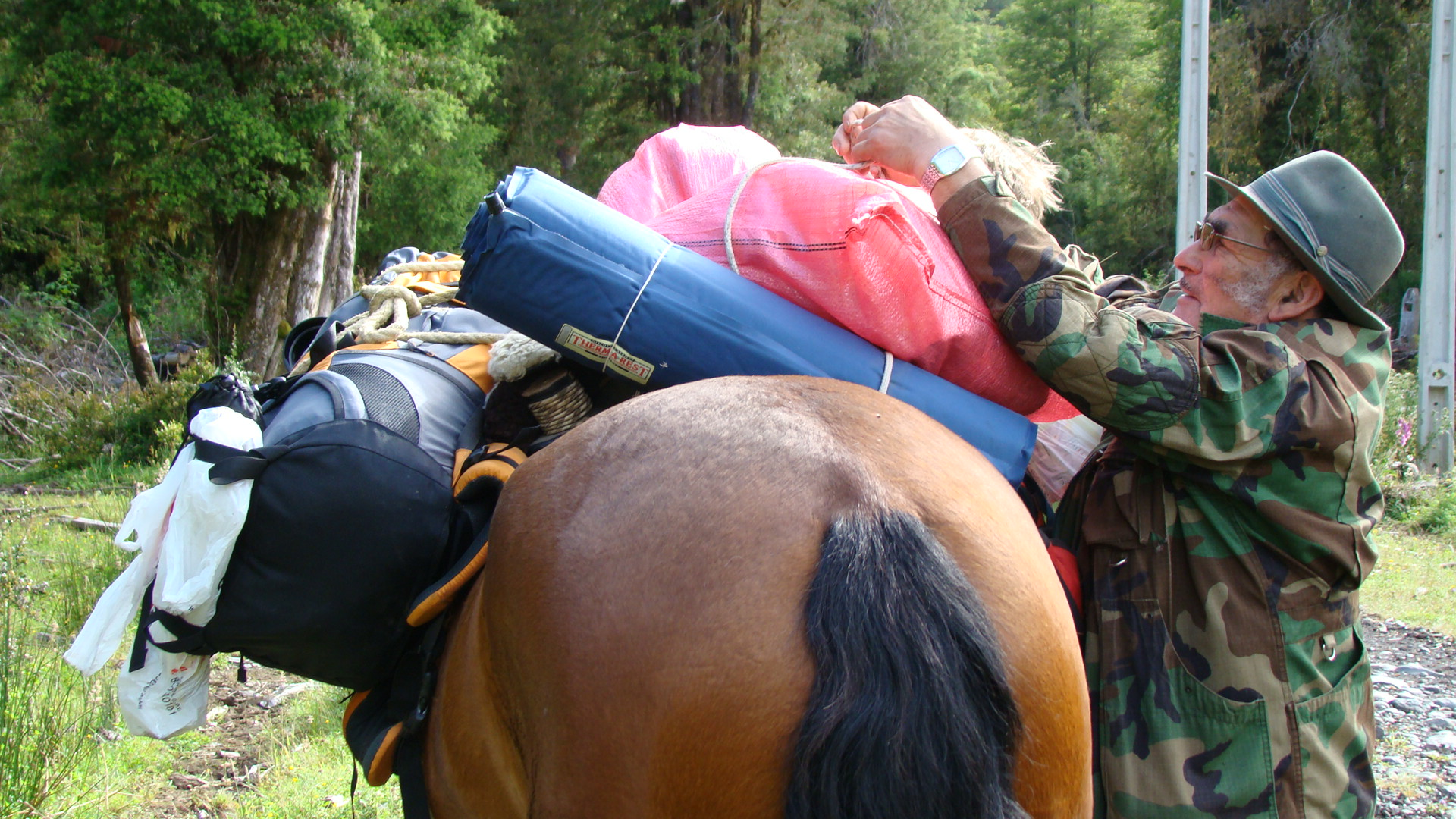
A muleteer loading a pack horse in southern Chile

In Latin America, muleskinners transport coffee, maize (corn), cork, wheat, and myriad other items. They used to be common in the Paisa Region (Antioquia and the Colombian Coffee-Growers Axis) of Colombia but were replaced in the 1950s by tractor trailers called locally "tractomulas" paying homage to the mules that used to do this hard job. In California, muleteers work out of pack stations. In Europe, there are still muleteers in the south of Portugal and the southwest of Spain, in the cork producing area. Their role is now limited to transporting the cork with their mules, out of the Mediterranean oak forest to more accessible routes, where modern means of transport are available.

== Names and etymology ==
The English word muleteer comes from the French muletier, from Old French, from mulet, diminutive of mul, mule. The term muleskinner means someone who can "skin", or outsmart, a mule.

The Spanish word arriero is derived from the verb arrear, which means to urge cattle or other stock to walk. The verb itself is derived from arre, which is the call used to cry out to animals for this purpose. In English, an arriero is one type of muleteer, a wrangler of pack animals.

The Catalan word traginer comes from the Latin word tragīnare, a variant of tragĕre which means "to transport".

== Outfits ==
Typical muleteer outfits vary from country to country:

- Carriel: Leather bag traditionally made of nutria leather. It is used to carry personal goods and money. It has become an element of the Colombian fashion.
- Espadrilles (alpargatas) : Sandals made of fique (natural fiber obtained of furcraea plants and leather.
- Machete
- Poncho: Rectangular piece of fabric, usually white with linear embroidery, that is used to protect the face and neck from the cold weather.
- Ruana: Square wool garment, larger than the poncho, with a hole in the middle for the head. It covers the torso.
- Straw hat (sombrero aguadeño)
- Tapapinche: Leather apron.

== In popular culture ==
The fictional Juan Valdez, brand representative of the Federación Nacional de Cafeteros de Colombia, is an archetypal muleteer carrying coffee sacks with his mule.

In Cormac McCarthy's second Border Trilogy novel, The Crossing, Billy's wolf upsets the muleteers' burros, which wreaks substantial havoc before Billy moves on.

"Mule Skinner Blues" is a country music song first recorded in 1930 by Jimmy Rodgers, which has inspired many subsequent variations.

The 1964 Broadway musical Man of La Mancha features a band of muleteers as one of the primary antagonists.

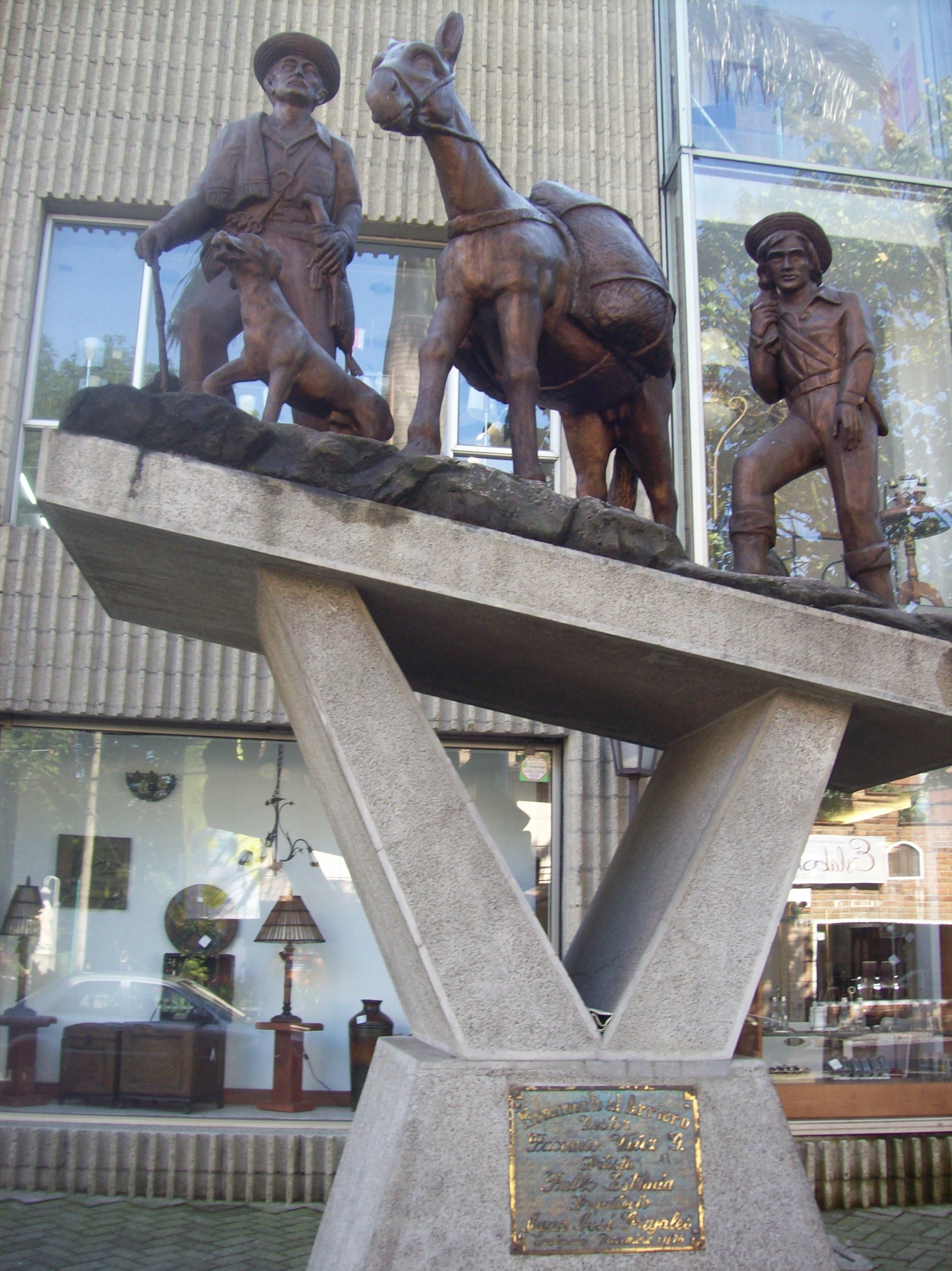
Monument to the Arriero in Envigado, Colombia

== See also ==
- Igualada Muleteer's Museum
- Teamsters drove animals pulling a wagon.
- Mule drivers of Metsovo
- Tropeiro (equivalent of arriero in Brazil)
