= Satchel =

Type of bag

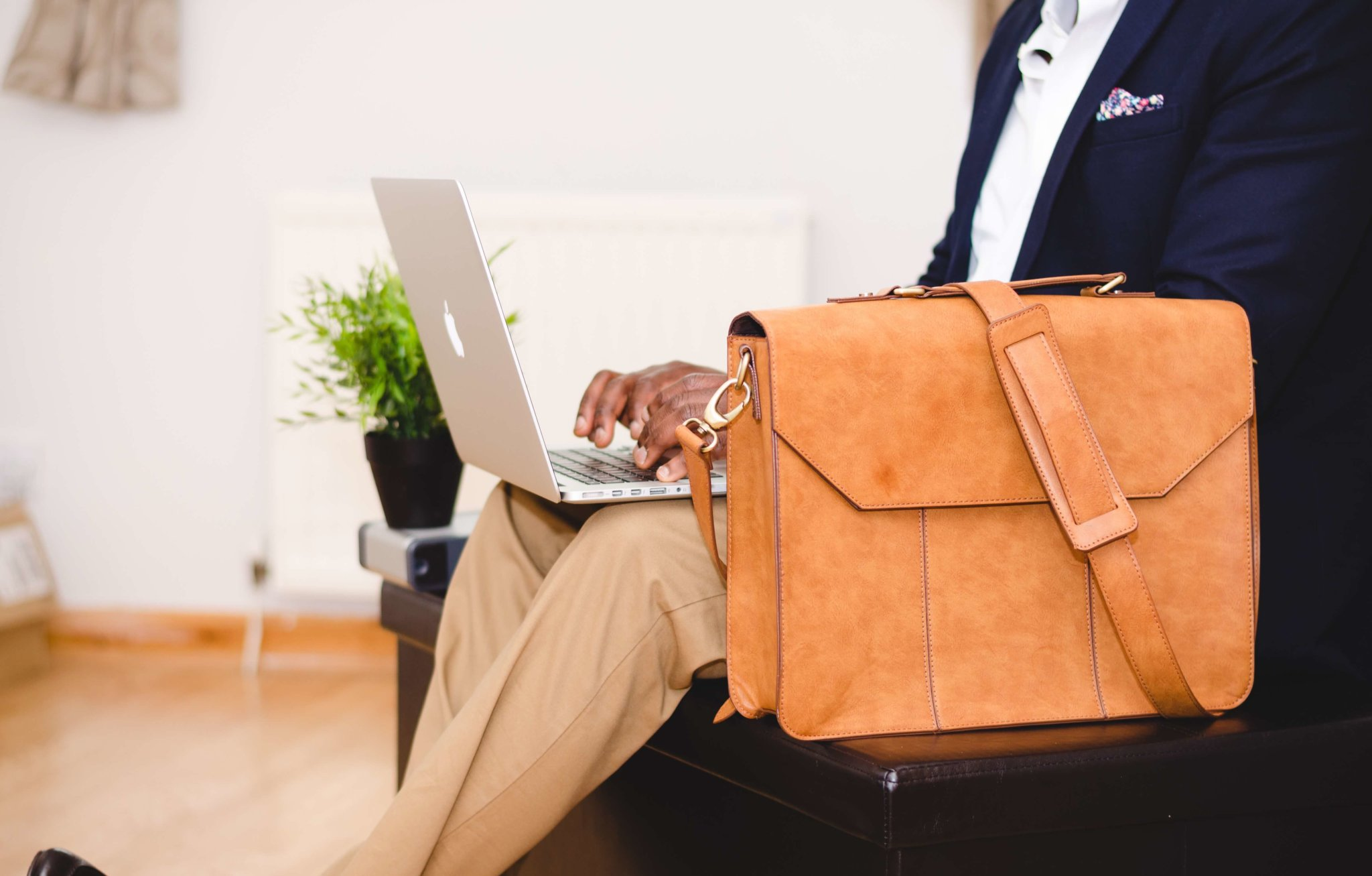
Leather satchel

A satchel is a bag with a strap, traditionally used for carrying books. The strap is often worn so that it diagonally crosses the body, with the bag hanging on the opposite hip, rather than hanging directly down from the shoulder. The back of a satchel extends to form a flap that folds over to cover the top and fastens in the front. Unlike a briefcase, a satchel is soft-sided.

== School bag ==
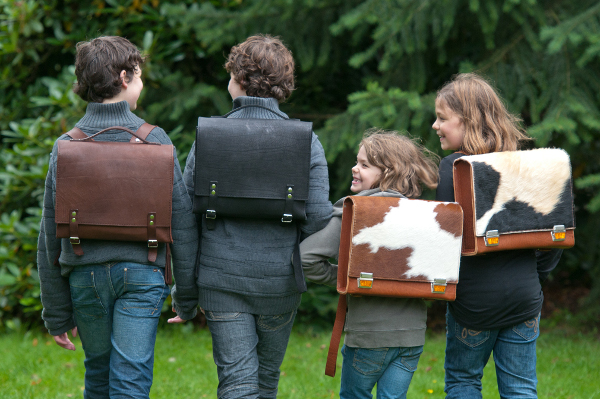
Children carrying leather and cowhide satchels in Germany

The satchel has been a typical accessory of English students for centuries, as attested in Shakespeare's famous monologue, "All the world's a stage": “The whining school-boy, with his satchel and shining morning face.” The traditional Oxford and Cambridge style satchel features a simple pouch with a front flap. Variations include designs with a single or double pocket on the front and sometimes a handle on the top of the bag. The classic school bag satchel often had two straps, so that it could be worn like a backpack, with the design having the straps coming in a V from the centre of the back of the bag, rather than separate straps on each side. This style is sometimes called a satchel backpack. The widespread use of modern backpacks by students began in the late 1960s, when lightweight nylon daypacks replaced traditional shoulder satchels and canvas book bags.

In Japan the term for a school bag satchel is randoseru.

== In fashion ==
The satchel became a fashion accessory in the 2000s and 2010s, with the proliferation of satchel-shaped handbags and other accessories from various brands such as the Cambridge Satchel Company.

== See also ==
- Hunting bag
- Messenger bag
- Backpack
- Handbag
- Carriel, a leather satchel used in Colombia
- Loculus, a satchel carried by Roman legionaries
- Mail satchel
- Satchel charge
