= Backpack =

Bag carried on one's back

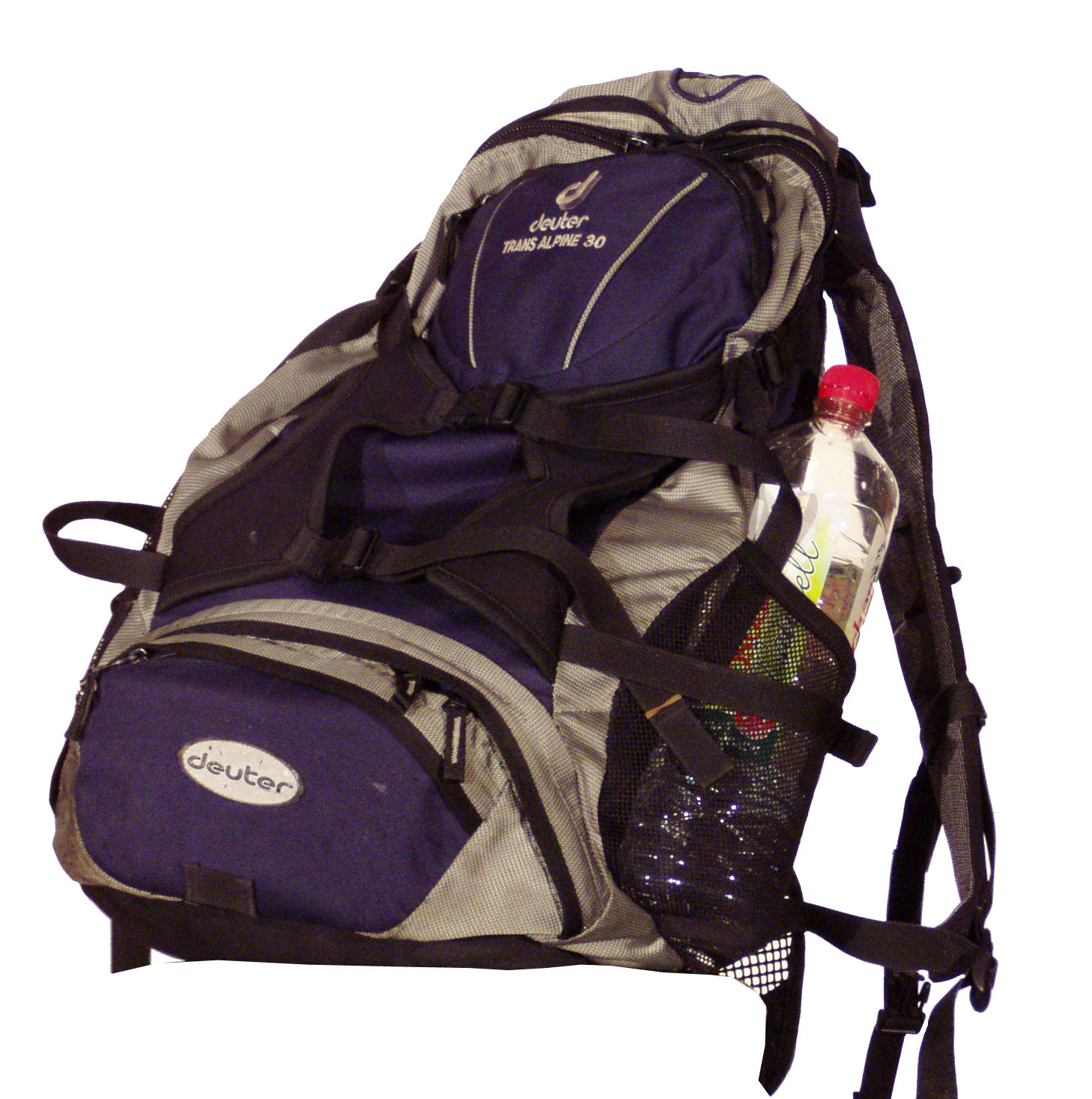
A 30 L top and bottom-loading hiking backpack

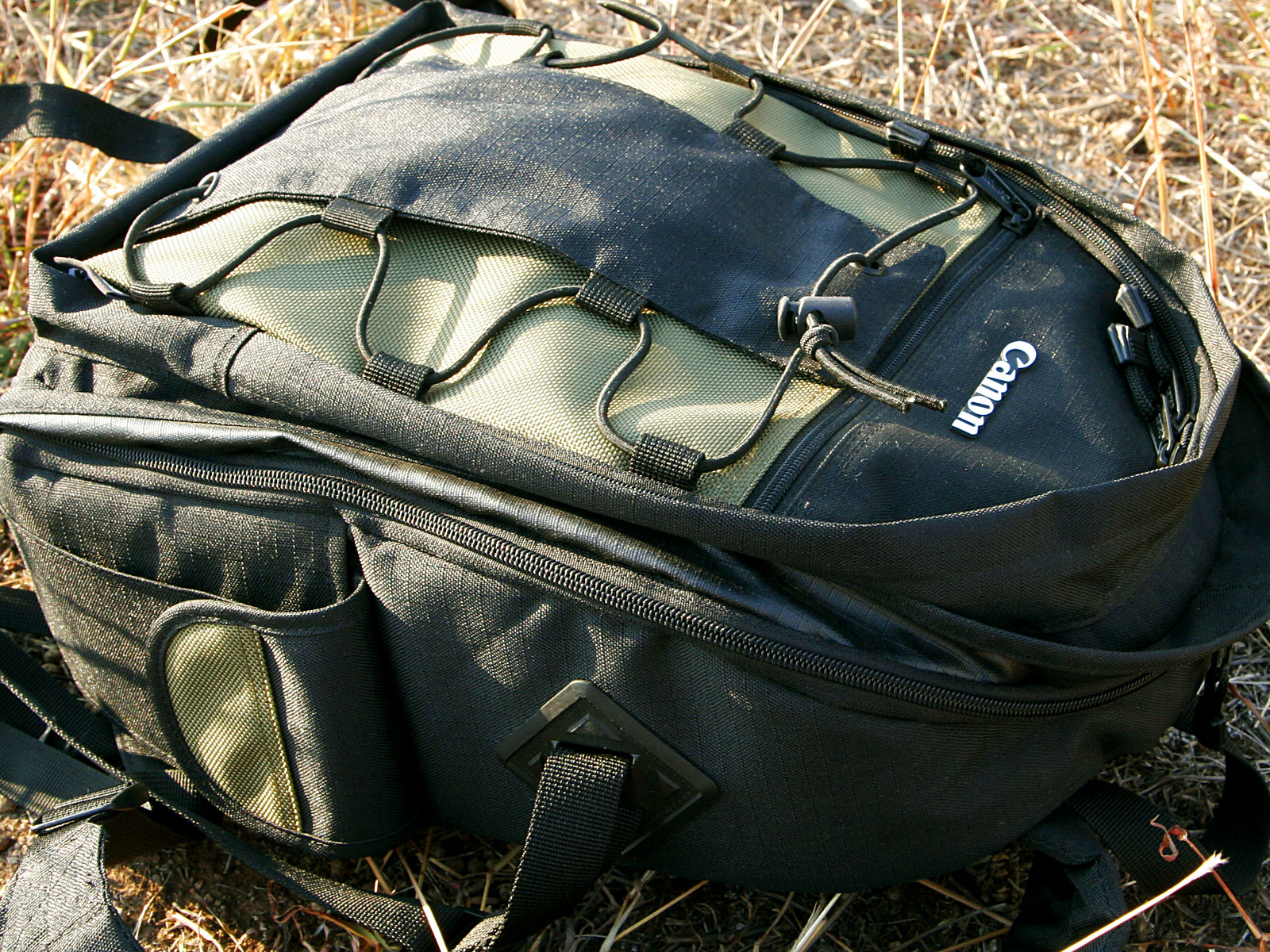
A 12 L front-loading photography backpack

A backpack, also called knapsack, schoolbag, rucksack, pack, booksack, bookbag, haversack, packsack, or backsack, is in its simplest frameless form, a fabric sack carried on one’s back and secured with two straps that go over the shoulders, and is used to carry goods from one place to another. It can feature an external or internal frame to transfer heavy loads off the user’s shoulders and onto their hips, reducing strain and increasing comfort on long hikes with heavy gear.

Backpacks are commonly used by hikers and students. They are often preferred to handbags for carrying heavy loads or carrying any sort of equipment, because of the limited capacity to carry heavy weights for long periods of time with the hands.

Large backpacks, used to carry loads over 10 kilograms (22 lb), as well as smaller sports backpacks (e.g., running, cycling, hiking, and hydration), usually offload the largest part (up to about 90%) of their weight onto padded hip belts, leaving the shoulder straps mainly for stabilizing the load. This improves the potential to carry heavy loads, as the hips are stronger than the shoulders. It also increases agility and balance, since the load rides closer to the wearer's own center of mass.

== Terminology ==
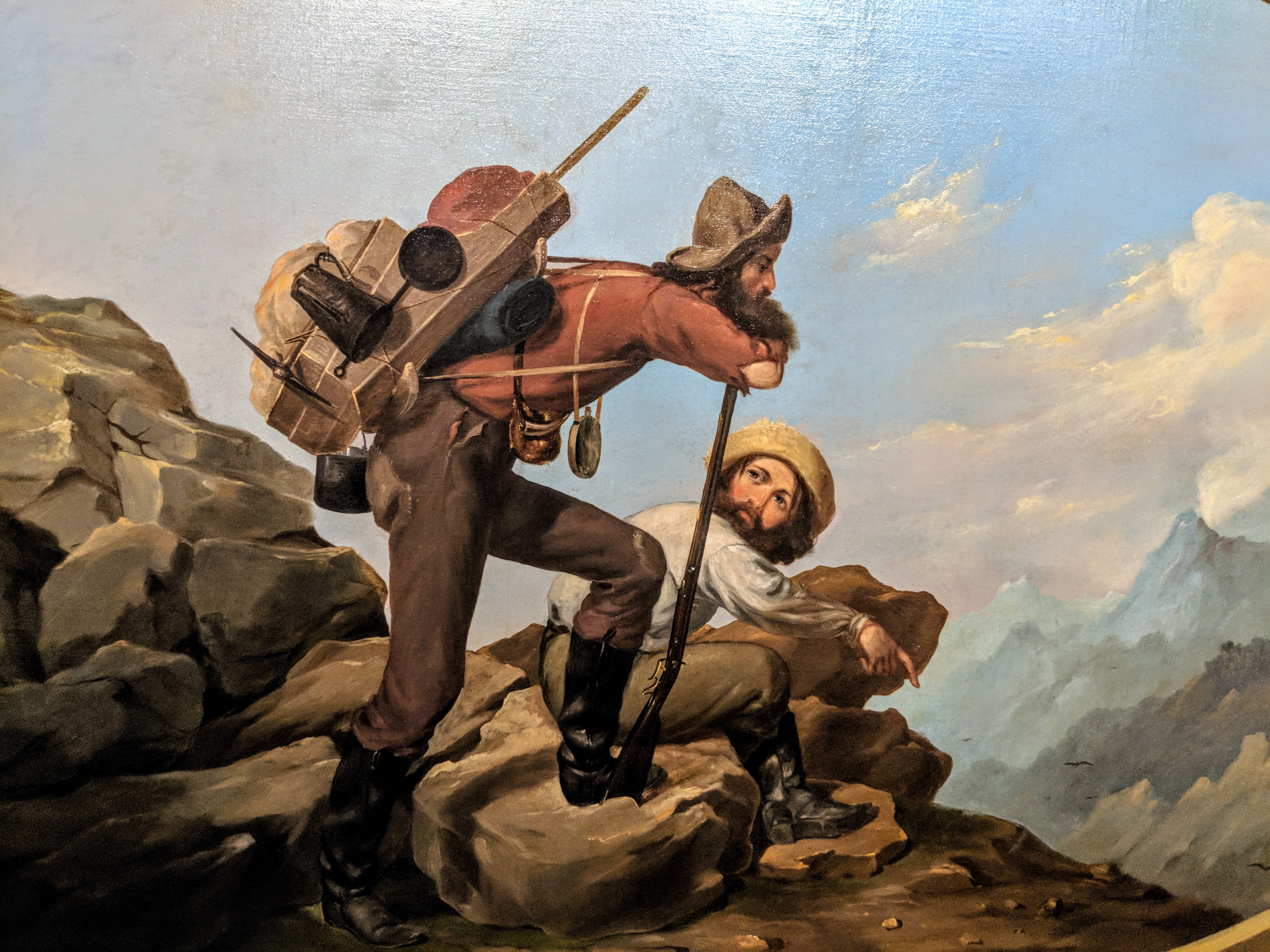
A miner carrying a backpack during the California Gold Rush

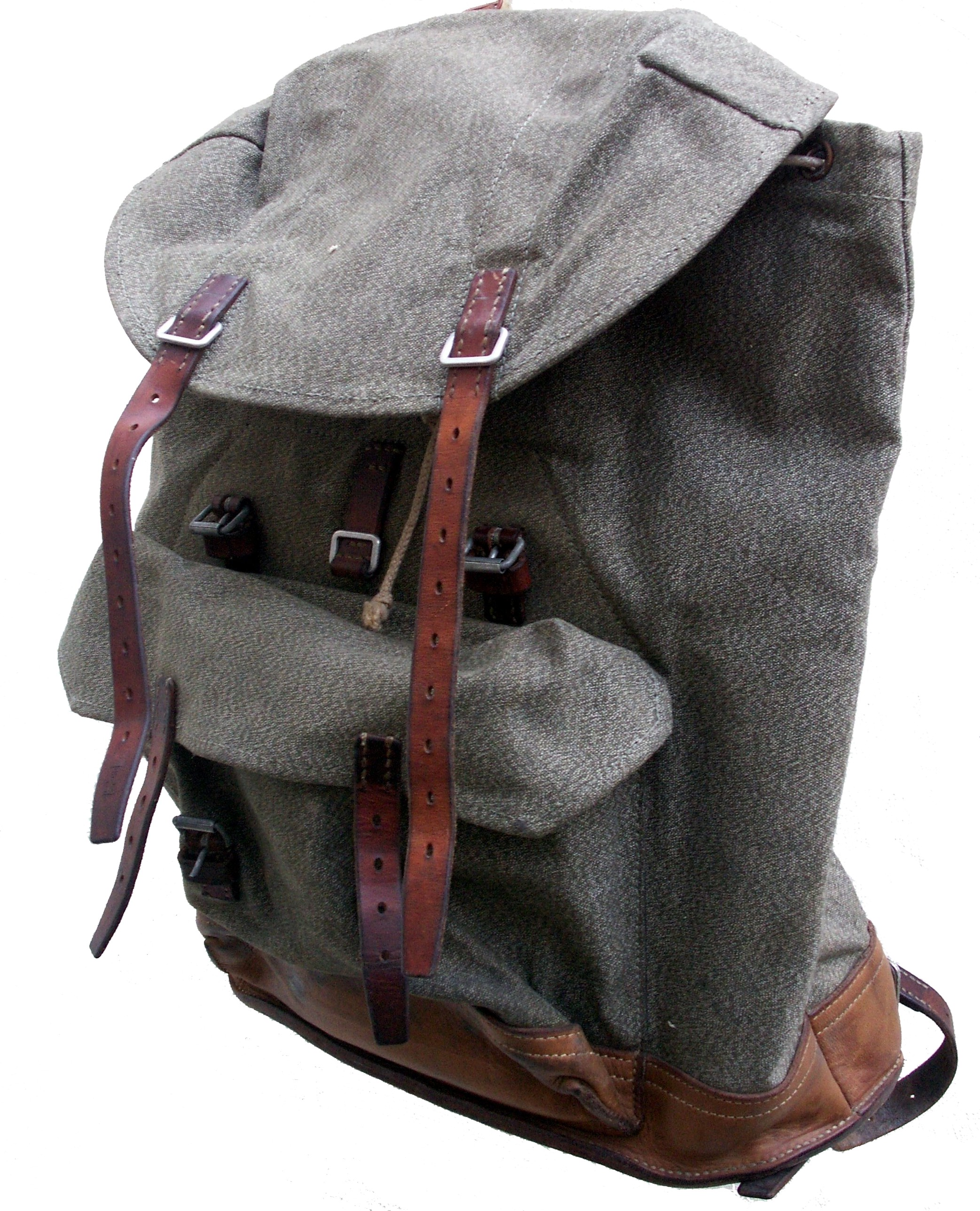
Swiss army integrated bearer (internal) frame backpack (c. 1960; front)

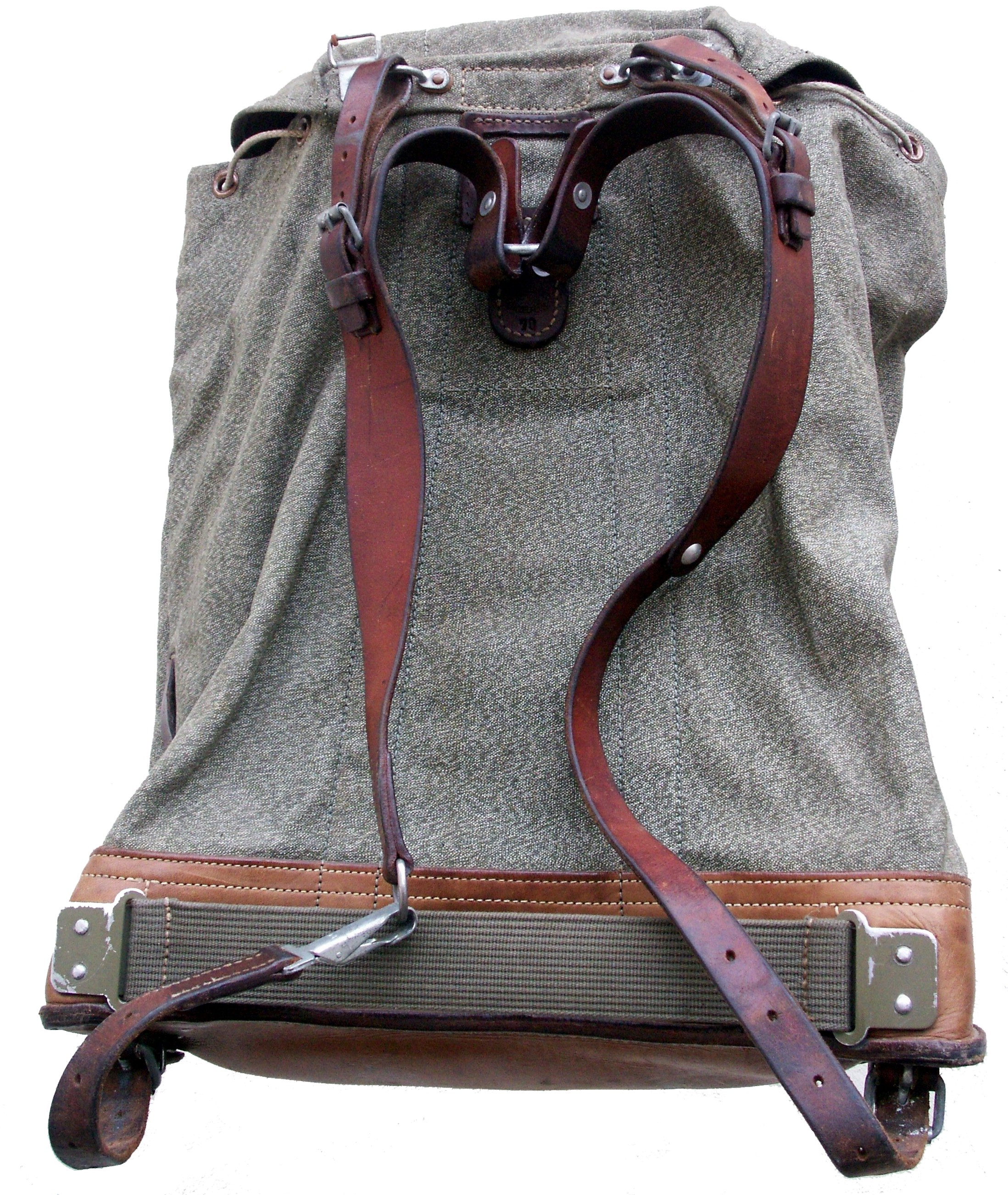
Swiss army integrated bearer (internal) frame (c. 1960; front)

The earliest known use of the word backpack dates from 1896 (OED).

The word rucksack is a German loanword mainly used in the US, UK, and other Western countries by hikers and campers. In Middle High German ruck(e) means "back" (dorsum), which led to the Upper German word ruggsack. In modern German the word "der Rucksack" is commonly used.

The word knapsack was the usual name for a rucksack or backpack up until the middle of the 20th century.

Alternative names include haversack from the German Hafersack meaning "oat sack" (which more properly describes a small cloth bag on a strap worn over one shoulder and originally referred to the bag of oats carried as horse fodder), Kraxe (a German rucksack with a rigid framework), and bergen (a large load-carrying rucksack, from a design issued by the British Army during the Second World War).

== Designs ==
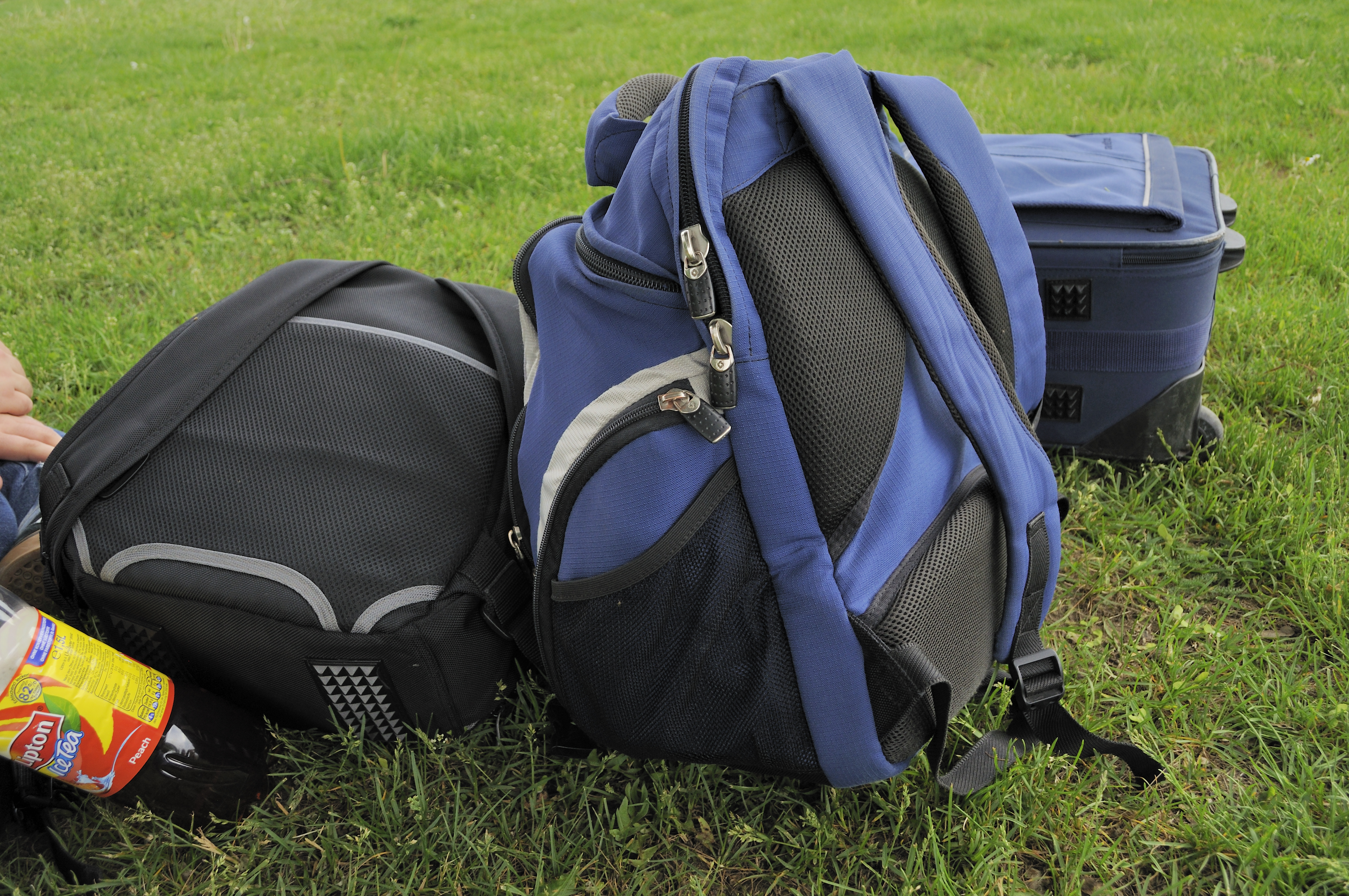
Frameless backpack

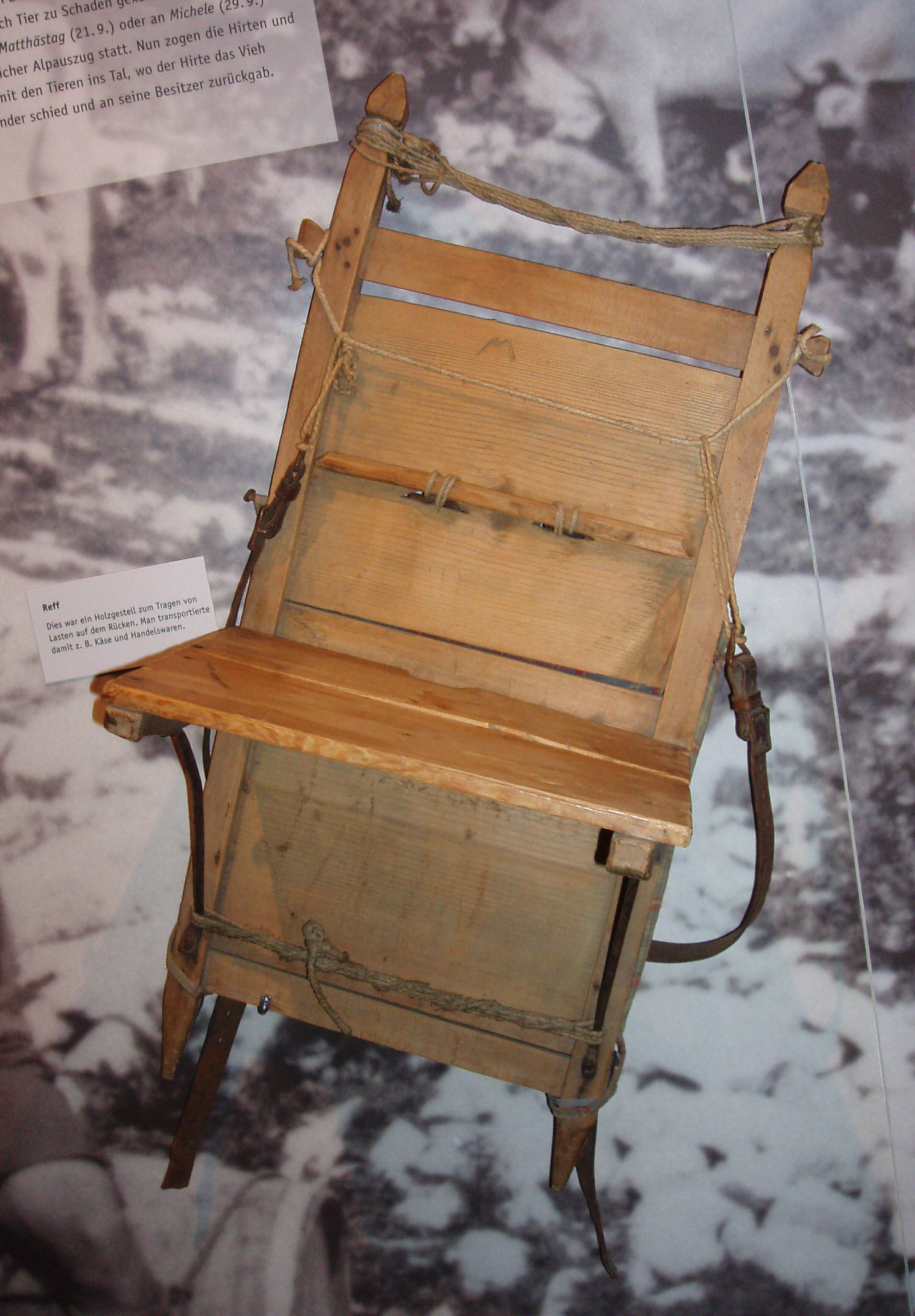
A back frame with shelf used to carry loads in the Allgäu, where it is known as a Reff

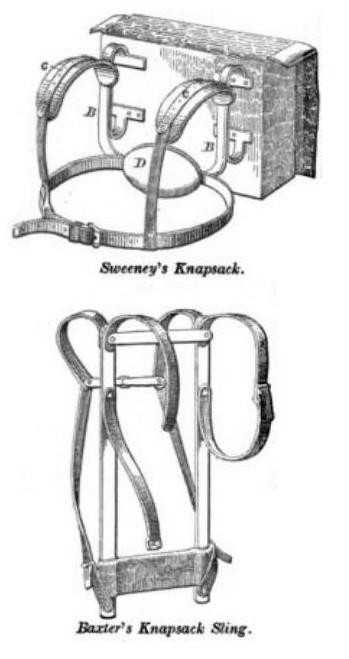
Two examples of external frame backpack designs dating to the 1860s

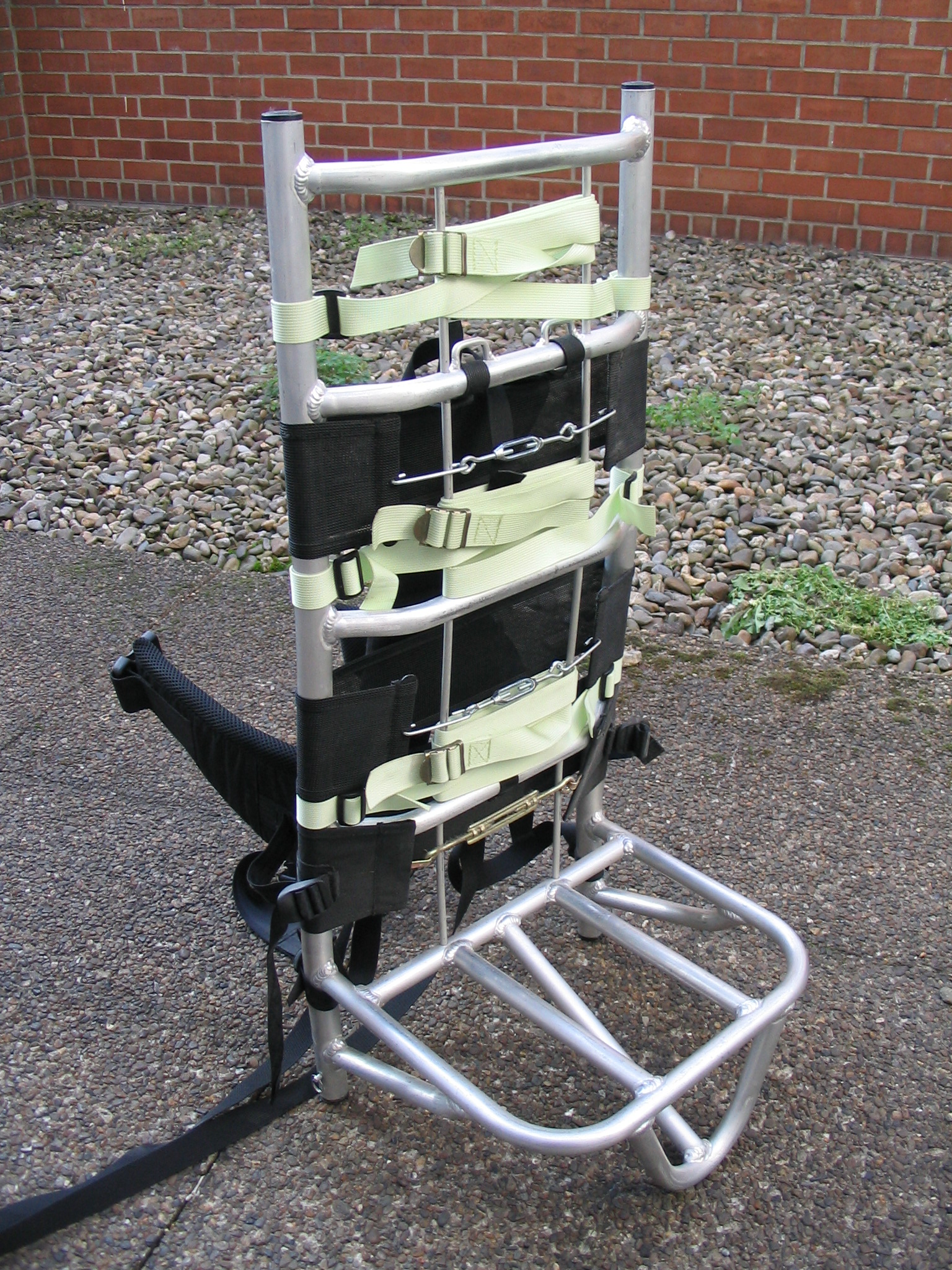
Modern external frame

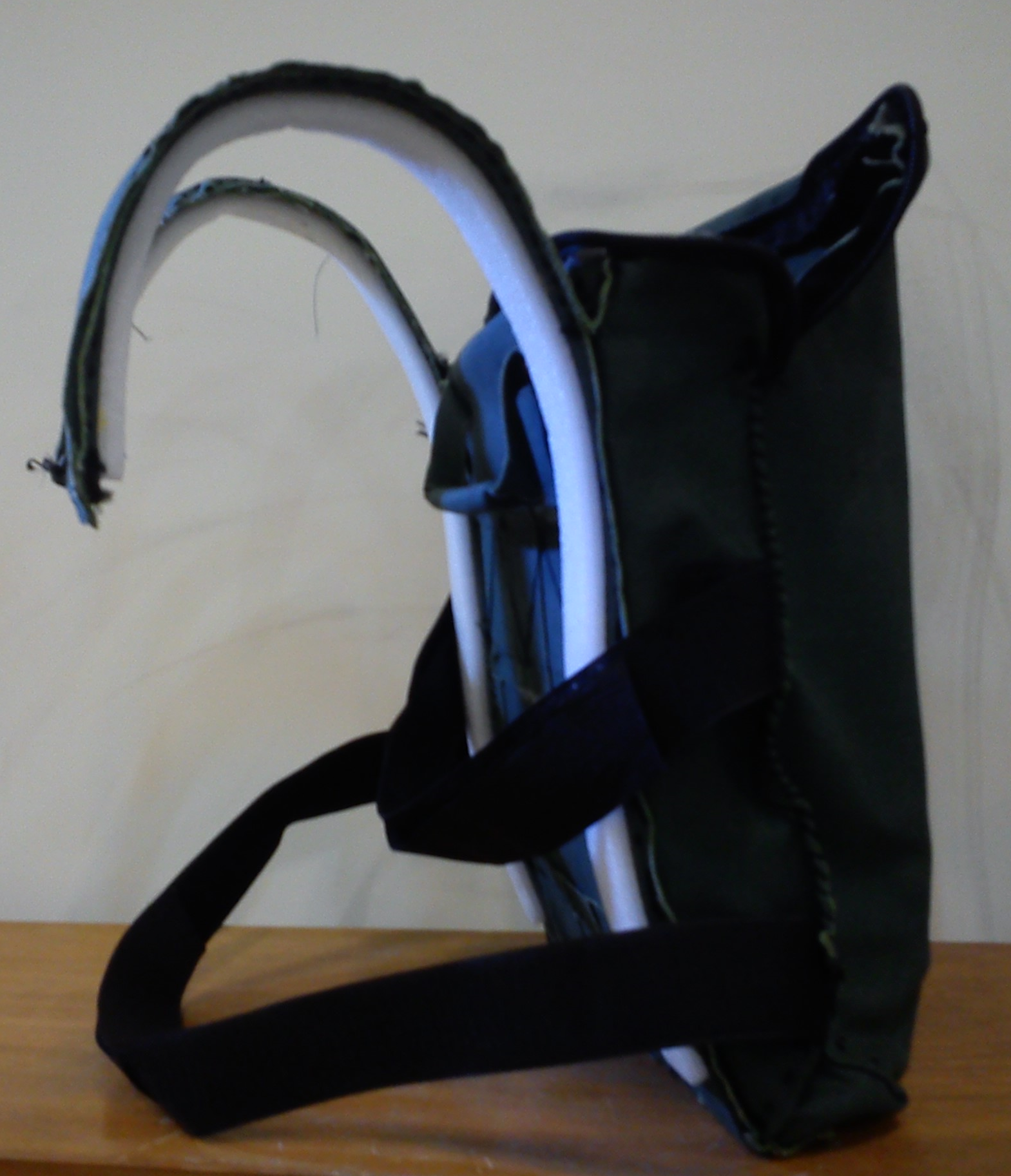
Backpack with non-flexible composite straps

Backpacks in general fall into one of three categories: frameless, external frame, and internal frame. A pack frame, when present, serves to support the pack and distribute the weight of its contents across the body more appropriately, by transferring much of the weight to the hips and legs. Most of the weight is therefore taken off the shoulders, reducing the chance of injury from shoulder strap pressure (many backpacks equipped solely with shoulder straps can affect the posture of a person carrying more than 14 kg (30 lbs)), as well as being less restrictive of the upper body range of motion. Most backpacks can be closed with either a buckle mechanism, a zipper, or a dry-bag type closure, though a few models use a drawstring fitted with a cord lock for the main compartment.

=== Frameless ===
The simplest backpack design is a bag attached to a set of shoulder straps. Such packs are used for the general transportation of goods and have variable capacity. The simplest designs consist of one main pocket. This may be combined with webbing or cordage straps, while more sophisticated models add extra pockets, waist straps, chest straps, padded shoulder straps, padded backs, and sometimes reflective materials for added safety at night. These packs are generally produced inexpensively.

Some outdoor packs, particularly those sold for day hikes, ultralight backpacking and mountaineering are sometimes frameless as well.

==== Sports ====
Sports and hydration backpacks are smaller with a profile closer to the body, wider straps, and can come with water bladders and hip belts for running, cycling, or hiking. Running hydration packs are the smallest and lightest, many under 2 L (0.44 imp gal; 0.53 US gal) and most under 6 L (1.3 imp gal; 1.6 US gal). Compression straps across the top of one's body are common, as are hip belts. Cycling hydration packs are 6–10 L (1.3–2.2 imp gal; 1.6–2.6 US gal) sitting high on the back. Although daypacks are small, averaging 10–30 L (2.2–6.6 imp gal; 2.6–7.9 US gal), all trekking and hiking hydration packs are generally the largest and heaviest. 35–65 L (7.7–14.3 imp gal; 9.2–17.2 US gal) and above are common.

=== External frame packs ===
External frame packs were designed to carry heavy loads above 20 kg (44 lb), giving the wearer more support and protection and better weight distribution than a simple, frameless strapped bag. Wooden pack frames were used for centuries around the world. Ötzi the Iceman may have used one in Copper Age Alpine Italy, though some archaeologists believe the frame found with the body was part of a snowshoe. Such packs are common in military and mountaineering applications; metal versions first appeared in the late-19th century.

The first external frame rucksack to receive a patent was made by Henry Clay Merriam, a U.S. Army officer during the late 19th century. Introduced in 1887, Merriam's innovative pack was made with drab duck canvas, which was attached to a light steel frame. In addition to two shoulder straps, the pack featured several leather straps that allowed the infantryman to attach his bedroll and canteen to the frame, instead of having them rest on his chest and hips. The most important feature, however, was the two hardwood rods that extended from the sides of the pack to leather pockets on a half-belt, which rested across the lower back and hips. This system allowed the pack to elevate off the back and shoulders, and thus transfer the weight of the load onto the hips. Though he tried in vain to sell his invention to the U.S. Army, he was only able to sell a few thousand packs to the New York National Guard, and the French and Austrian Armies.

Backpack design took another major leap forward with the introduction of the first aluminum external-frame backpack by Jack Abert, an avid hiker from Phoenix, Arizona. As a Boy Scout camp counselor, Abert saw firsthand how inadequate the backpacks scouts were using at that time, and set out to design a more comfortable pack. In 1947, he designed a contoured aluminum frame that was both strong and light, and shifted much of the weight off the shoulders and onto the hips. By 1950, his invention had received official approval from the National Council of the Boy Scouts of America, and by 1967, he had become the largest manufacturer of backpacking frames in the world.

Today's external frames are typically made from aluminum, other lightweight metal alloys, and recently reinforced synthetic polymers or plastic and are equipped with a system of straps and tautly-stretched netting which prevents contact between the metal frame and the user's back. In addition to comfort, this "stand-off" provides the additional benefit of creating air circulation between the frame and the wearer's back. For this reason, external frame packs are generally considered to be a "cooler load" than internal frame designs. External frame packs have a fabric "sack" portion which is usually smaller than that of internal frame packs, but have exposed frame portions above and below the sack to accommodate attachment of larger items. In addition, the sack can often be removed entirely, permitting the user to customize the configuration of their load, or to transport a non-conventional load such as a quartered game animal. Military packs are often external frame designs due to their ability to carry loads of different shapes, sizes, and weights.

=== Internal frame packs ===
The internal frame backpack was invented in 1967 by Greg Lowe, who went on to found Lowe Alpine and Lowepro, companies specializing in backpacks and other forms of carrying bags for various equipment. Lowe's innovation also featured the first side compression straps, the first modern sternum strap, and the first load stabilizers. Internal-frame packs have a large fabric section around an internal frame composed of strips of either aluminum, titanium, or plastic, sometimes with additional metal stays to reinforce the frame. A complex series of straps works with the frame to distribute the weight and hold it in place. The internal frame permits the pack to fit closely to the wearer's back and minimizes shifting of the load, which is desirable when participating in activities that involve upper-body movement, such as scrambling over rocky surfaces and skiing. However, the tight fit reduces ventilation, so these types of packs tend to be more sweaty than external frame packs. The internal construction also allows for a large storage compartment; a few lash points (including webbing loops and straps for sleeping bags and other large items) may be present, but as the frame is completely integrated, it is difficult to securely lash larger and heavier items that do not fit inside the compartment to the outside of the pack. Internal frame packs initially suffered from smaller load capacity and less comfortable fit during steady walking, but newer models have improved greatly in these respects. In addition, because of their snug fit, the improved internal frame models have largely replaced external frame backpacks for many activities.

== Daily use ==
A daypack is a smaller, frameless backpack that can hold enough contents for a day hike or a day's worth of other activities. They are not large enough for average wilderness backpacking that use full-sized sleeping bags and backpacking tents, but may be large enough for ultralight backpacking. Padded or unpadded waist straps may be provided to distribute weight across the body.

In many countries, backpacks are heavily identified with students, and are a primary means of transporting educational materials to and from school. In this context, they are sometimes known as bookbags or schoolbags. The purchase of a suitably fashionable, attractive, and useful backpack is a crucial back-to-school ritual for many students.

Typical school backpacks generally lack the rigid frame of an outdoor-style backpack and include only a few pockets in the front in addition to the main storage compartment. While traditionally very simple in design, school backpacks are often made with padded shoulder straps and backs as well as additional reinforcement to hold large numbers of heavy textbooks, as well as safety features such as reflective panels to make the wearer of the pack more visible at night.

Backpacks are sometimes worn as fashion accessories, serving the same function as a purse. Some such backpacks designed specifically for women are no larger than a typical purse, and are generally associated with younger women.

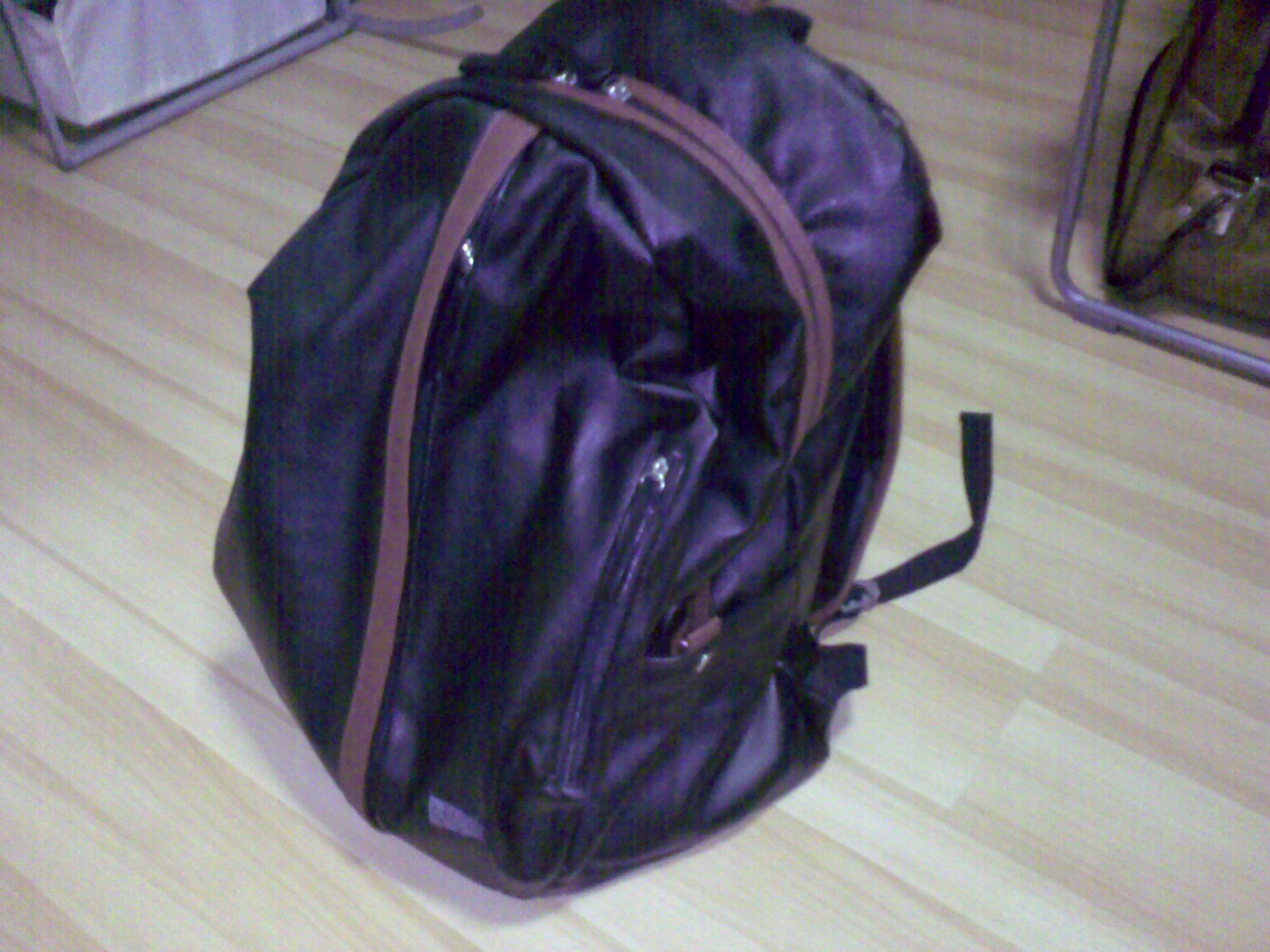
Daypack

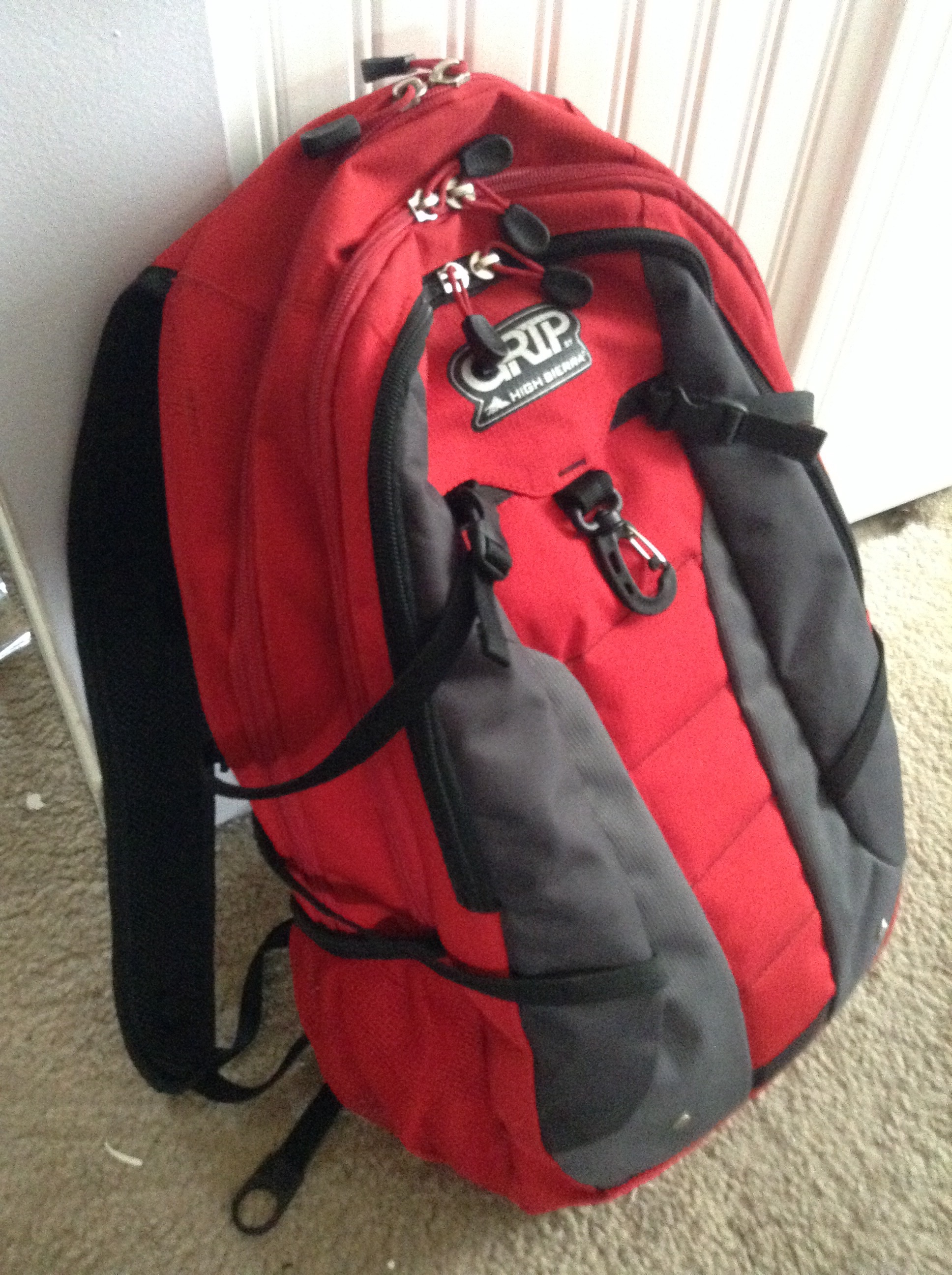
School bag

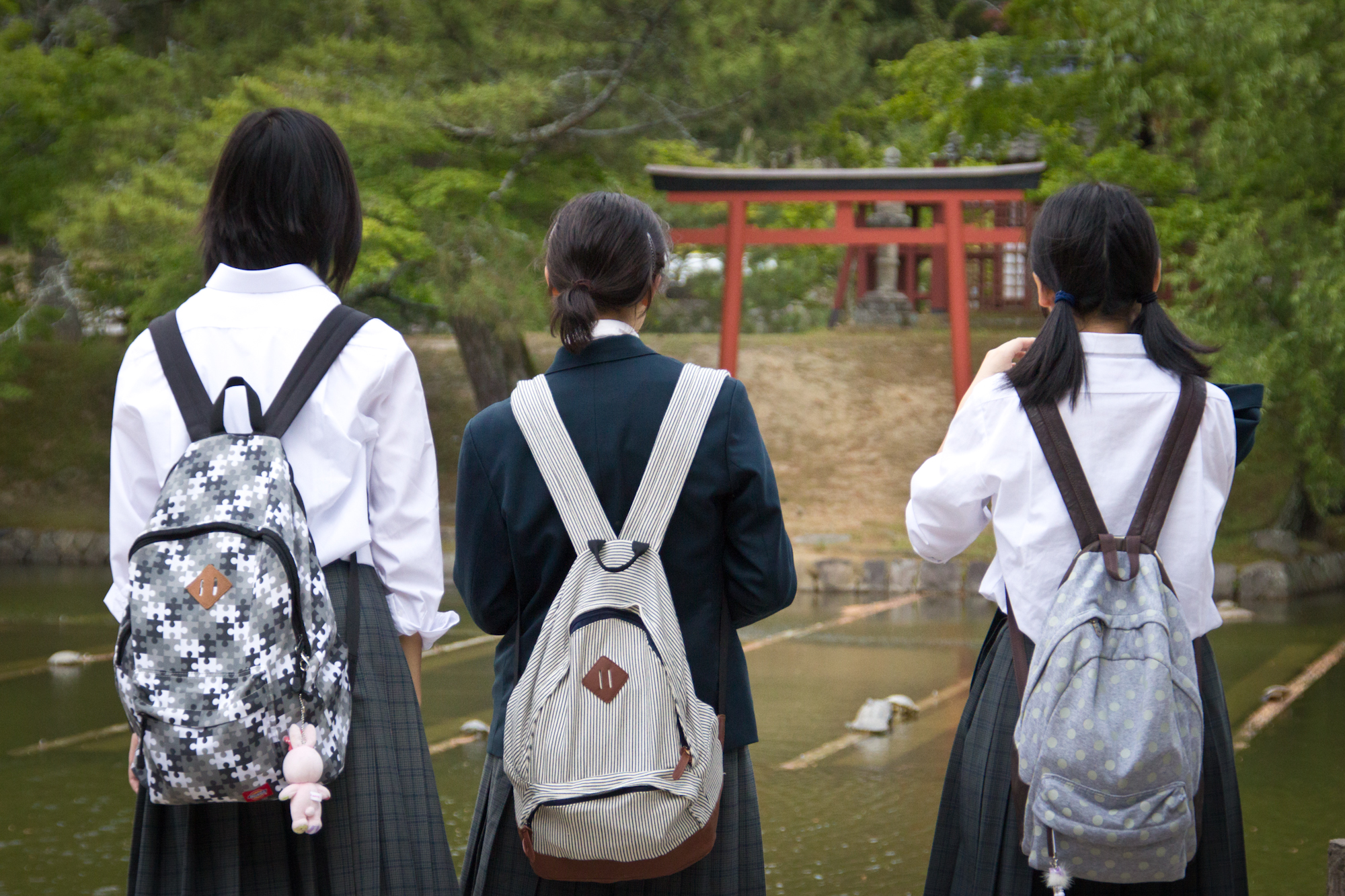
Loose carrying

== Special-purpose ==
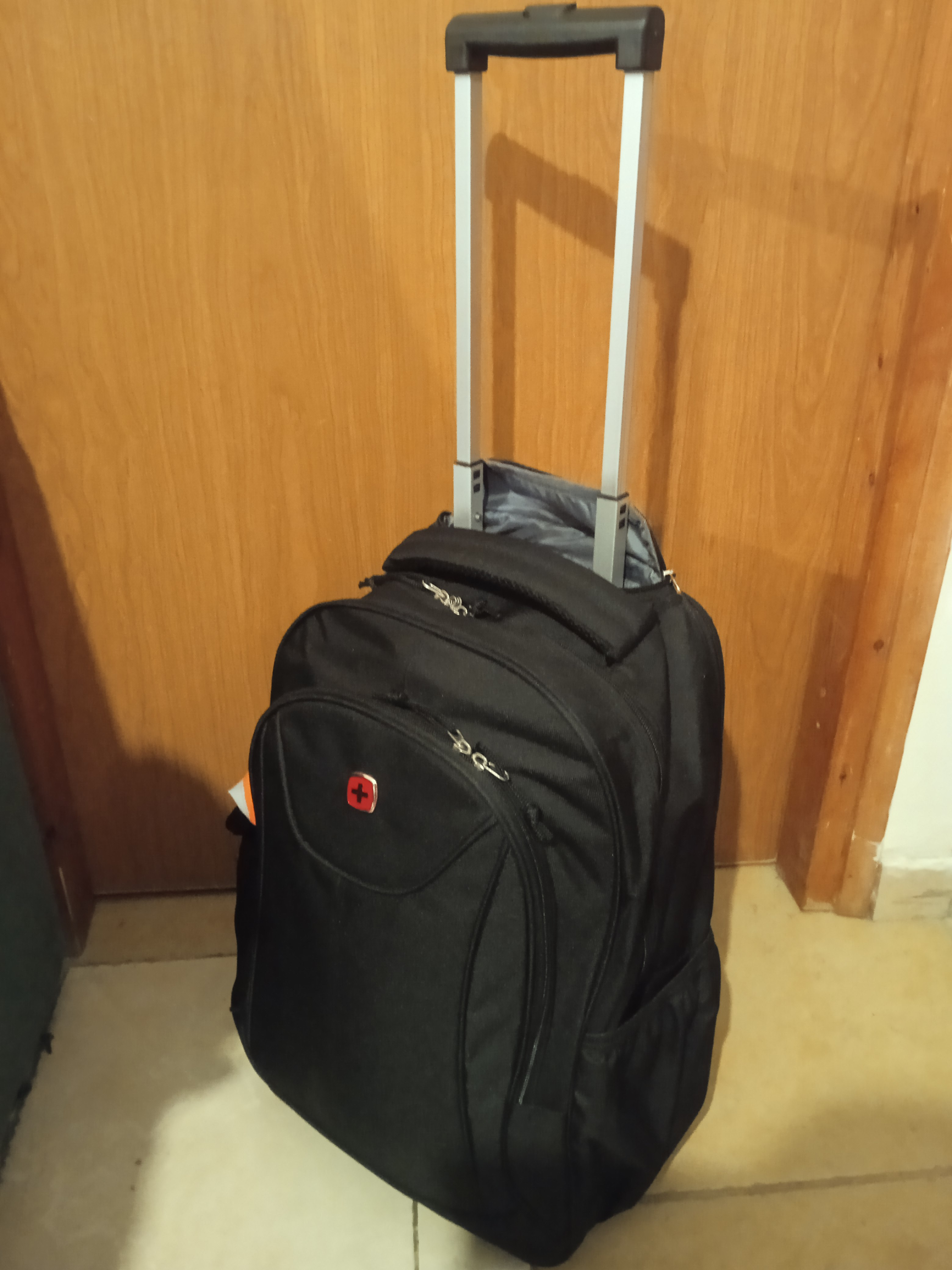
A rolling backpack, a hybrid between a backpack and a rolling suitcase

Some backpacks are designed for specific purposes, including carrying equipment, specialized gear, or even small pets. Common examples include backpacks for small valuable items such as laptops and cameras; backpacks designed to hold laptop computers in particular generally have a padded compartment to hold the computer and medium-sized pockets and flaps to accommodate accessories such as charger cables and mice. These are especially common in college and university settings. In order to supply these devices with electricity, a few high-end backpacks are equipped with solar panels.

There is also a category of sports backpacks that are designed specifically for athletic purposes. They may include features such as waterproof materials and pockets for sports gear.

Rolling backpacks have wheels on the bottom and an extending handle. Because of their design, rolling backpacks reduce the strain on the user, though the shoulder straps may be used to carry the pack for short distances when the terrain is not suitable for wheels. Some models have a backpack that can be detached from the trolley frame. Rolling backpacks are most commonly used while traveling by airplane or train.

Hydration backpacks are light daypacks specifically designed to hold water in a special water bladder (also known as a reservoir). Their purpose is to allow the carrier constant fluid hydration hands-free, so that the carrier can focus on their task without having to stop to get a water bottle out.

== Professional use ==
Backpacks are a standard part of the load-bearing equipment of soldiers, especially infantry, in most countries, and military-style packs are regularly available to civilians in military surplus stores. Well-known examples include the United States ALICE field pack and the British Army PLCE rucksack attachment, both of which are widely available to civilian markets both as actual military surplus (new or used) and as replicas. Such packs are often, though not always (e.g. the USMC's ILBE pack), external-frame packs, with the pack itself lashed or pinned to a metal or plastic carrying frame. For units that are entering combat situations, packs may be loaded heavily and can weigh in excess of 100 lb (45 kg). Each soldier may carry extra weapons, ammunition, rations, medical supplies, tents or other shelter material, and extra clothing.

Many police tactical units, as well as players of military-style combat games such as paintball and airsoft, use these military-style tactical backpacks and webbing for storing gear and ammunition.

Some more recent military/tactical designs, especially the MOLLE and ILBE packs used by the United States armed forces, are covered with webbing loop attachment points for increased carrying capacity.

Specialist backpacks are used by fire services for wildfire fighting and by rescue services for Search and Rescue. These backpacks are generally very modular, allowing the pack to be reconfigured to the user’s wishes, and are designed to load around the wearer’s hips. They may include features such as sections for water bladders and specially designed pouches, such as those used to carry personal fire shelters.

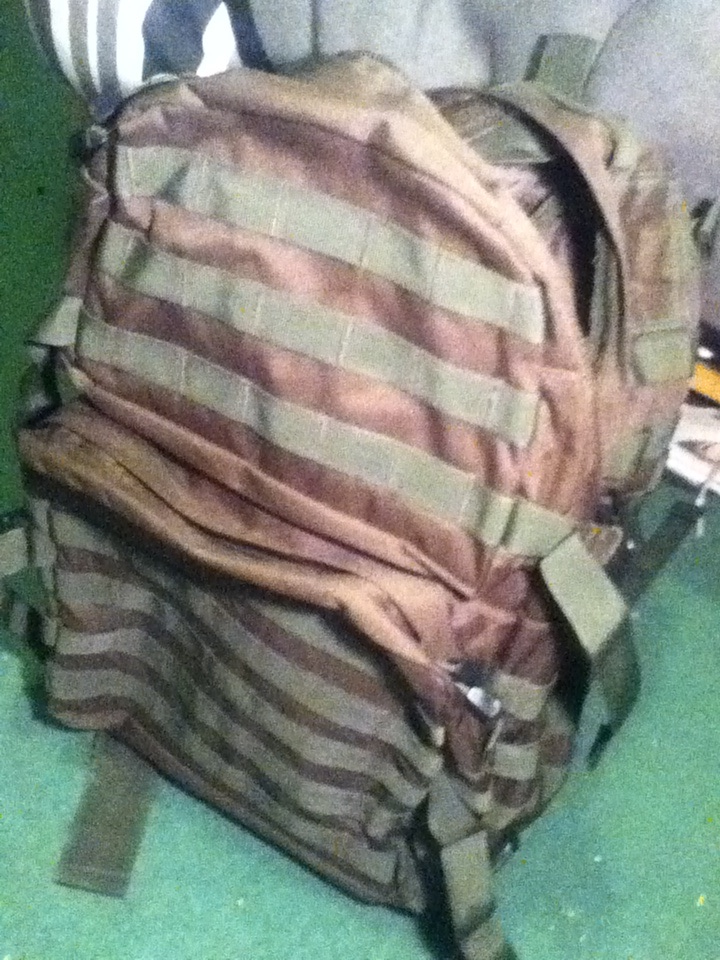
MOLLE patrol pack

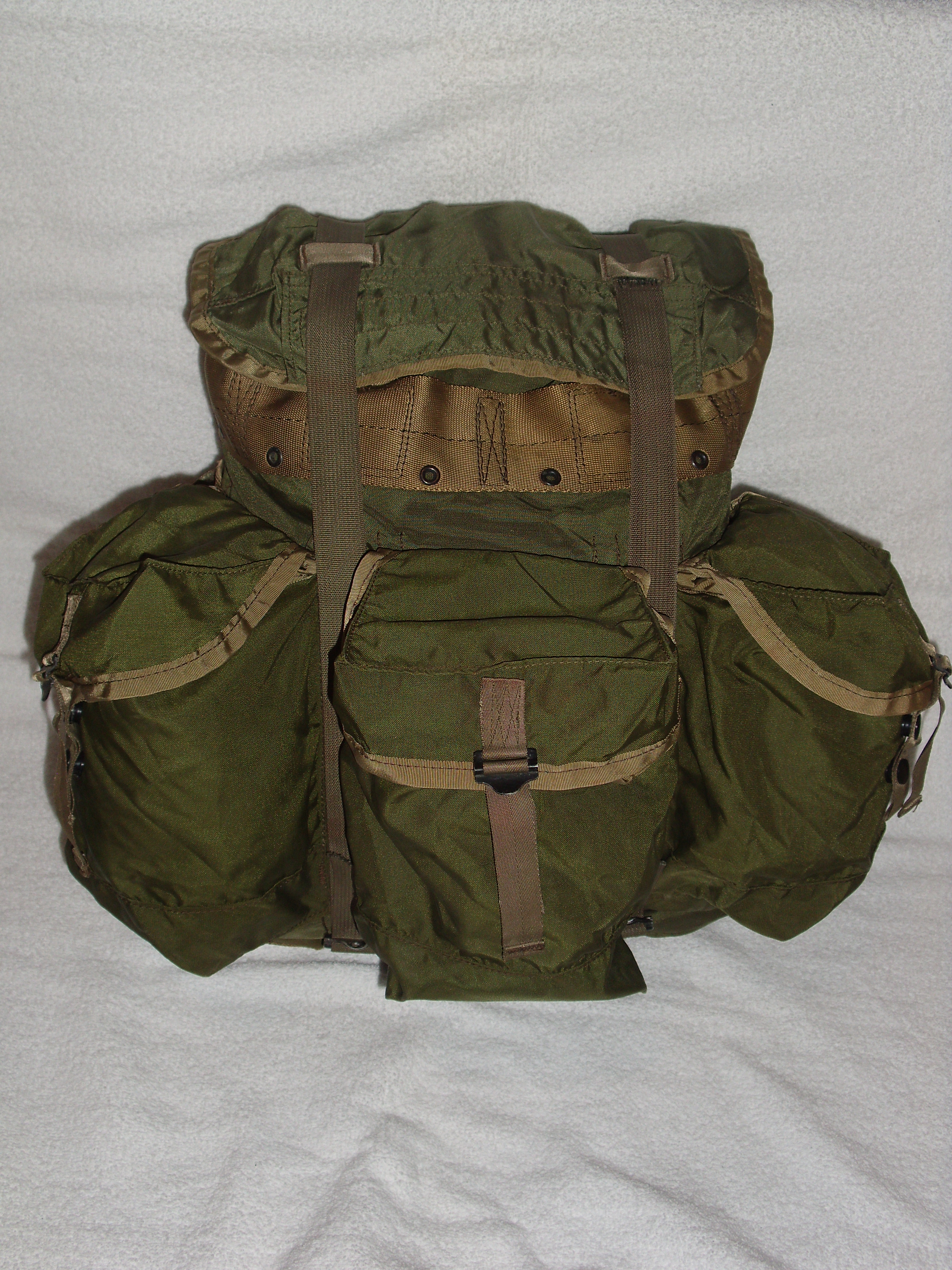
Tropical rucksack (back)

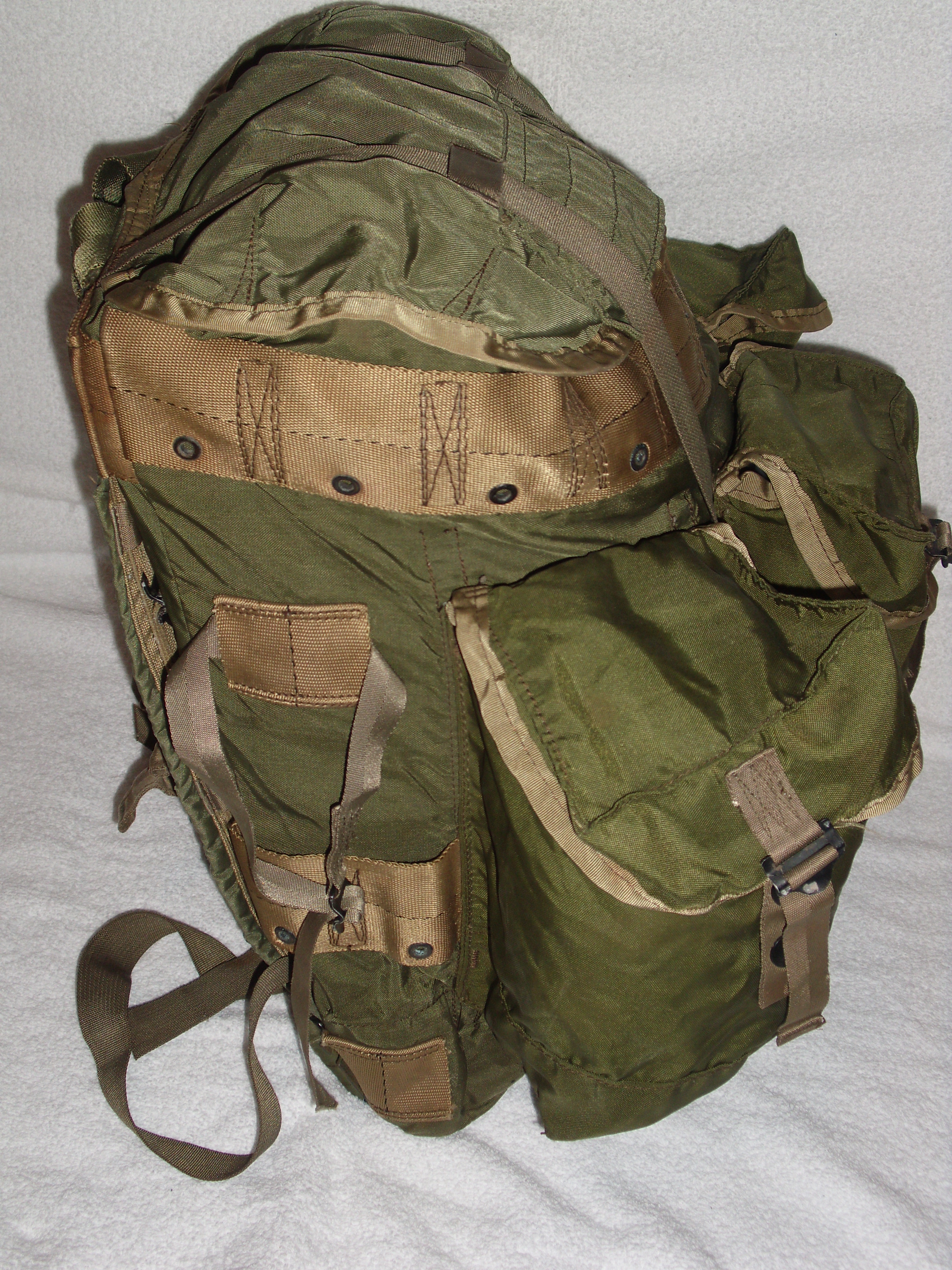
Tropical rucksack (side)

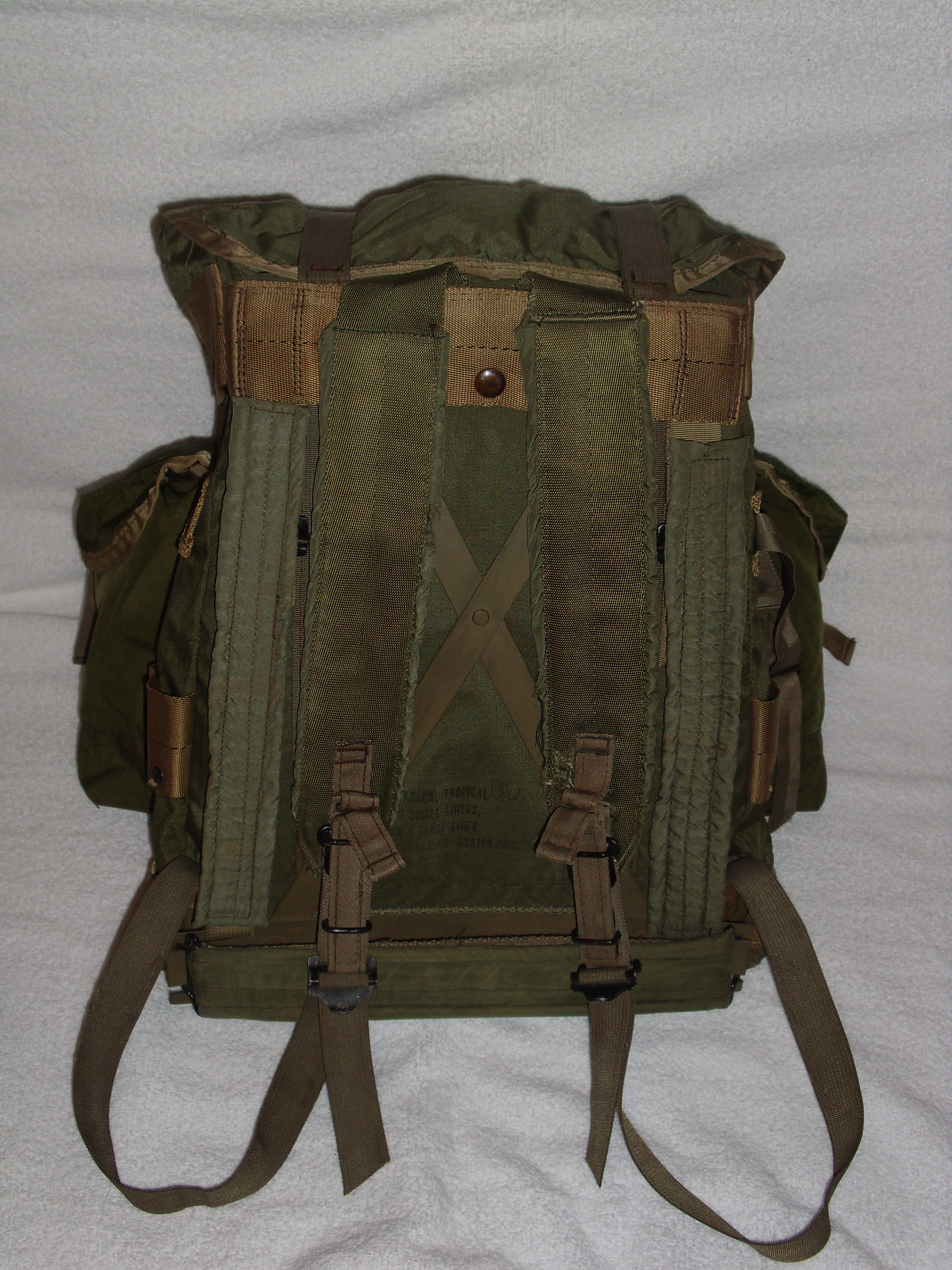
Tropical rucksack (front)

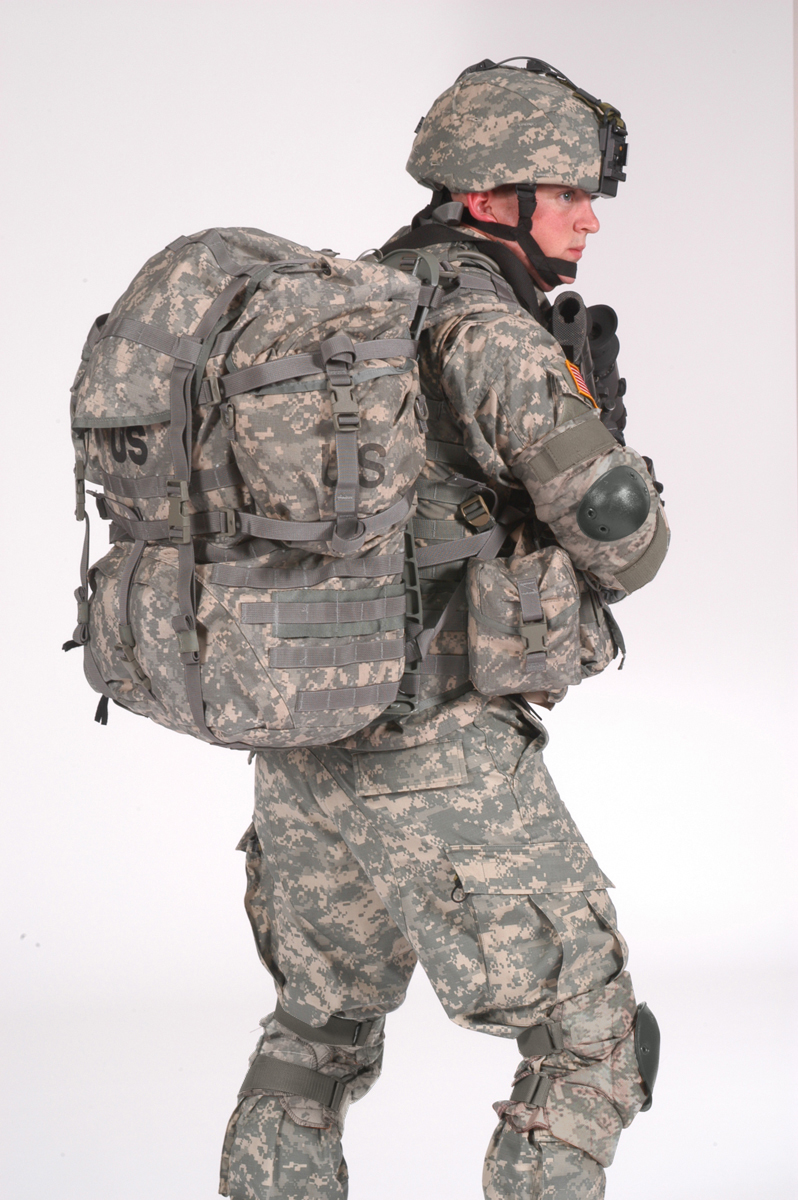
Military backpack

== See also ==
- Backpack palsy
- Bindle
- Duffel bag
- Fanny pack
- Hunting bag
- Hydration pack
- Messenger bag
- Pack basket
- Papoose
- Pasiking
- Loaded march, also known as "rucking" (exercise that involves carrying a heavy load such as a backpack)
- Satchel
