= English Retreads =

- Type: Privately held company
- Industry: Fashion accessories
- Founded: 2001
- Defunct: December 2014
- Fate: Liquidated
- Headquarters: Boulder, Colorado, United States
- Key people: Heather English (Owner and Designer); Molly Dempsey (Sales/Marketing); Kate Soloman (Business Manager)
- Products: Handbags, wallets, belts, laptop bags, key chains
- Number of employees: 9 (2007)
- Website: englishretreads.com at the Wayback Machine (archived December 27, 2014)

English Retreads was an American eco-fashion company that made handbags and accessories from recycled materials. The company was known for its low environmental impact, vegan, and handcrafted products in Boulder, Colorado.

English Retreads, named after its designer Heather English, offered handbags, wallets, belts, laptop bags and keychains that were all made from recycled materials, primarily reclaimed rubber and recycled PETE (plastic bottle) material.

== History ==
English Retreads began in 2001 by designer Heather English in the basement of her home in Nederland, Colorado. While floating down Boulder Creek on an old inner tube, English was struck with the idea to create a non-leather handbag from her rubber inner tube to fulfill her need for a sustainable and fashionable product.

English expanded the English Retreads line to include vintage rubber messenger bags, wallets, belts, dog collars and key chains. Truck stops throughout the Boulder area supplied English Retreads with the used inner tubes. Each of which typically had more than 60,000 miles on it before it was reinvented.

The company ceased operation in December 2014.

== Material ==
Typically, English Retreads were made completely from reclaimed rubber inner tubes. The products come from trucks and tractors. The rubber was cut, washed, dried, and buffed in order to prepare for resale. It is then cut into specific patterns to form the handbags.

The last line, "Luxe", used the rubber inner tubes for the product exterior and colorful PET (Polyethylene terephthalate) material lining for the interior. The PET material was made from 100% recycled plastic bottles. The last handbag in the collection uses PET material on the outside with accents of inner tube rubber. The handbags come in a variety of shapes and sizes, small enough for a clutch and large enough as a tote.
