= Mule drivers of Metsovo =

The mule drivers of Metsovo were one of the most significant professional transporters in the early modern Greece. In the Greece and especially in the Balkans, the transportation of goods was performed almost exclusively by mules. The range and method of operation of the mule owners made the profession of mule driver one of the most important ones for all land commerce and taxation of the time. In 1707, written sources start mentioning them as already having a trade guild established which leads credence to the belief that they were occupied in the transportation of goods since even older times. Throughout the 18th and 19th century they form one of the most active groups in the goods transportation industry in the Balkans. Pouqueville says the Vlach mule drivers are known with the name Metsovites, while he considers the people of Metsovo and the people of Zagori as the most active mule drivers in Balkan's European market. Bοué describes the keratzides of Metsovo as the most famous in all "Albania" and among the most renowned in the Balkans. According to Goudas, the transportation of goods from Bucharest, Constantinople (İstanbul), Belgrade and Adrianople (Edirne) was performed almost exclusively by Metsovites mule drivers.

== Sources ==
- F. Braudel, I Mesogeios kai o Mesogeiakos kosmos tin epochi tou Fillipou B’ tis Espanias, transl. K Mitsotaki [La Méditerranée et le Monde Méditerranéen à l'Epoque de Philippe II], transl. K. Mitsotaki, publ. National Bank of Greece Cultural Foundation, Vol. A’, publ. MIET, Athens 2 1993, pp. 349–356.
- F. C. H. LPouqueville, VoyagedelaGrèce, deuxièmeedition, tomesecond, Paris, 1826, pp. 22–23•
- F. C. H. LPouqueville, VoyagedanslaGrèce, tomepremier, ChapitreXII, Paris 1820, pp. 157.•
- A. Bοué, Die Εuropäische Türkei, Band II, Wien 1889, p. 479•
- A. Goudas, Vioi Paralliloi, ton epi tis anagenniseos tis Ellados diaprepsanton andron, Ploutos h’ Emporion, [Parallel lives of the men who excelled during the Renaissance, Wealth and Commerce], Vol. C’, printer's M. P. Peridou, Athens, 1870, p. 290.
- Archeio Ali Pasa, Syllogis I. Chotzi, Gennadeiou Vivliothikis tis Amerikanikis Scholis Athinon, [Ali Pasha Archives, I. Hotzis collection, Gennadius Library], Ed. – Commentary- Index: V. Panagiotopoulos with the collaboration of D. Dimitropoulos, P. Michailari, Vol. B 2007, pp. 676–677.
- G.Papageorgiou, Oi Syntechnies sta Giannena kata ton 19o kai tis arches tou 20ou aiona,[Professional guilds in Ioannina during the 19th and early 20th century], doctoral dissertation, publ. IMIAX, Ioannina 1998, p. 52 (note 1).
