= Cambridge Satchel Company =

Luxury brand in England

Cambridge Satchel
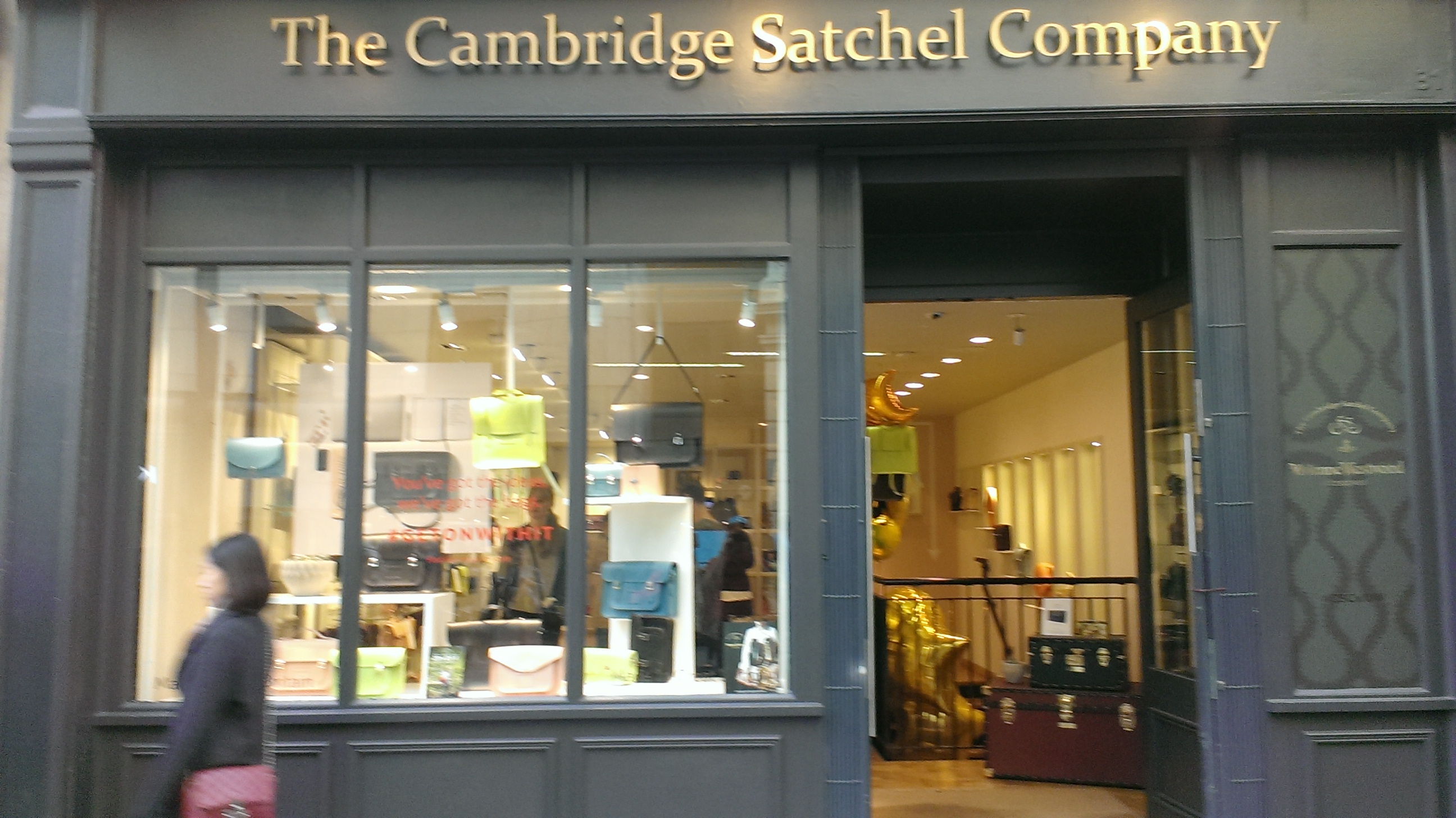
- Cambridge Satchel Company, Covent Garden, London
- Company type: Private
- Industry: Retail
- Founded: 2008; 18 years ago
- Founder: Julie Deane and Freda Thomas
- Headquarters: England
- Number of locations: 6 stores
- Area served: Worldwide
- Key people: Vincent Perriard
- Products: Leather goods
- Parent: Chargeurs
- Website: www.cambridgesatchel.com

Cambridge Satchel is a British company that produces satchels and other leather goods.

The company was founded in 2008, in Cambridge by Julie Deane and her mother Freda Thomas as a way to pay private school fees for Deane's children. She had been looking for a durable, timeless schoolbag for her children, describing her goal as "what Harry and Hermione would have used at Hogwarts" and telling her children "Harry Potter. I am telling you that is a boy that would have had a satchel with that Hogwarts school uniform." Her colourful handmade leather satchels are based on an original Oxford and Cambridge satchel design and were aimed at school children, but met unexpectedly high demand as a fashion accessory, and became, according to The Guardian, "a cult among twenty-something fashion bloggers". The company was started with just £600.

An early boost came from being featured in the 2009 Guardian Christmas Gift Guide (as a men's accessory), which triggered "an avalanche of orders".

Following coverage by international fashion magazines and a collaboration with the fashion brand Comme des Garçons, production of the satchels increased from three homemade items a week to 1,500 in 2011, and turnover increased from £15,000 to an estimated 8 million in 2011. The company ultimately started their own Cambridge Satchel factory near Leicester. By 2011 they were making over 3,000 bags a week in the UK and selling to 86 countries. By 2014 they were making 500 bags a day, with 2013 sales of £13 million.

In 2013 they opened their first physical store, and as of 2015 they had 4 stores in the United Kingdom. In 2015, after focusing on women, the first line aimed exclusively at men was launched, along with the first store specifically targeted at men.
