= Carriel =

Small leather satchel from Colombia

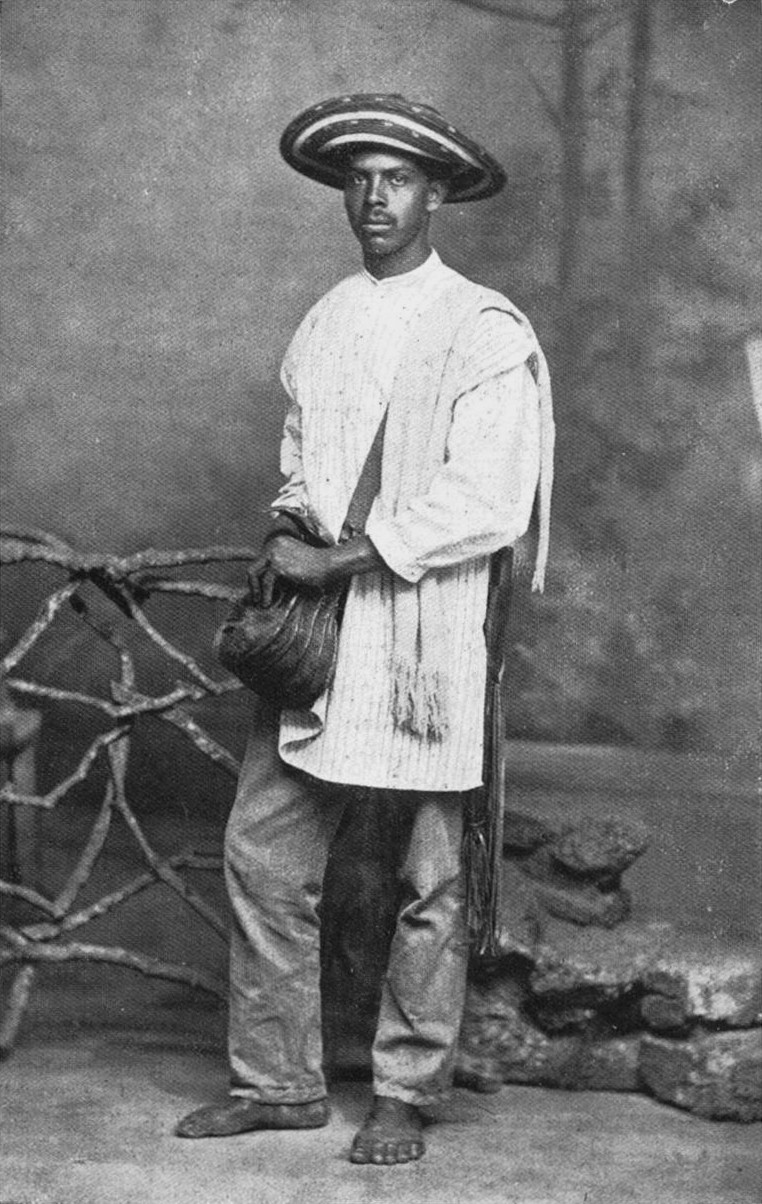
Paisa muleteer with his satchel, poncho, machete and hat.

A carriel is a small leather satchel from Colombia. They are similar in appearance to a saddlebag but worn over the shoulder, usually by men. Carrieles were traditionally made of rawhide or nutria fur and are typical of the Antioquia region of Colombia. The bag is associated with paisa culture. The carriel is part of folkloric dress of the region and is also used by modern businessmen throughout the country.

It is said that the word carriel comes from the English "carry-all", but derivation from the French cartier (handbag) is equally likely.

== See also ==
- Hunting bag
- Handbag
