= Messenger bag =

Bag with a long strap worn across the body

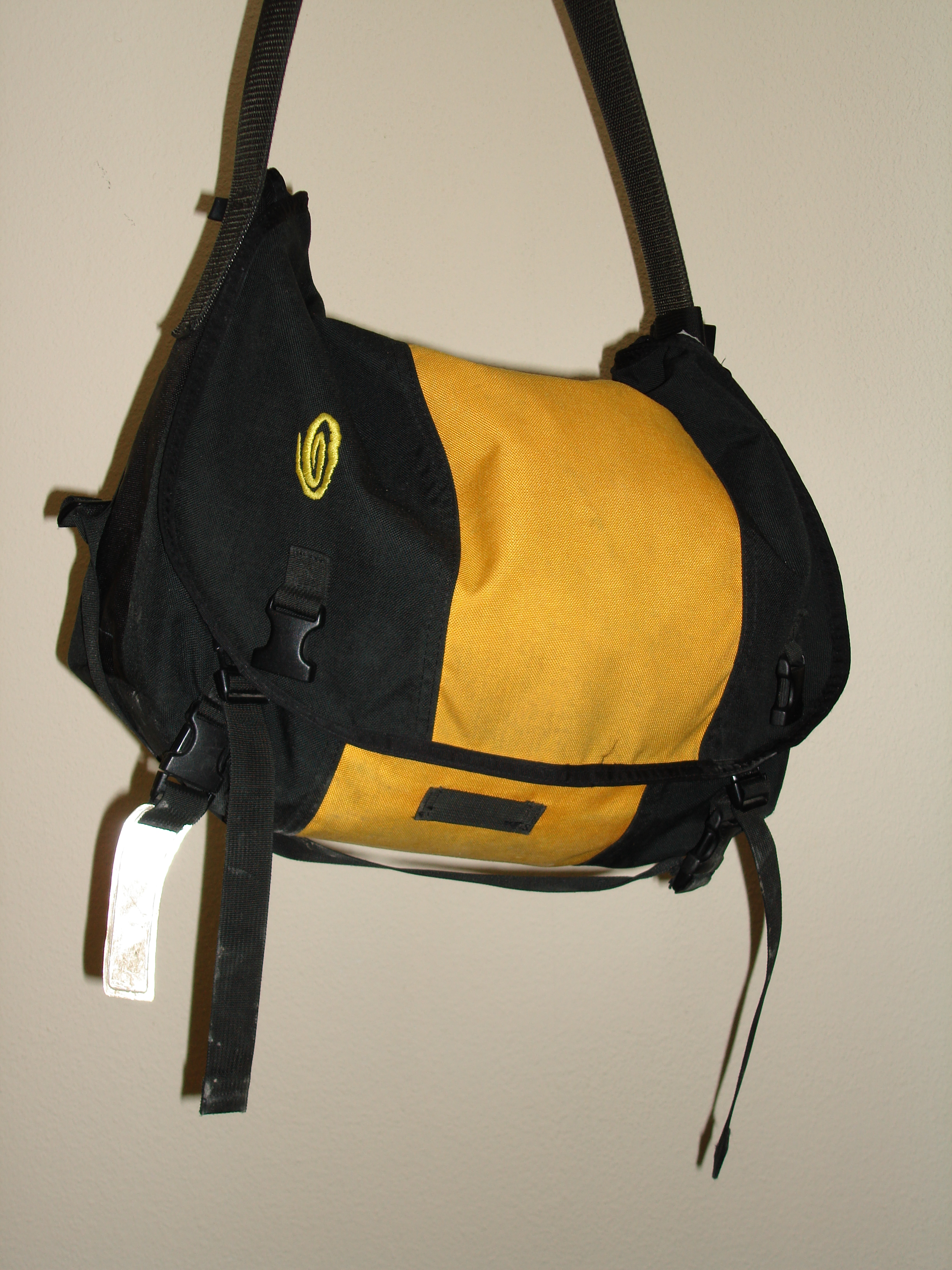
Messenger bag

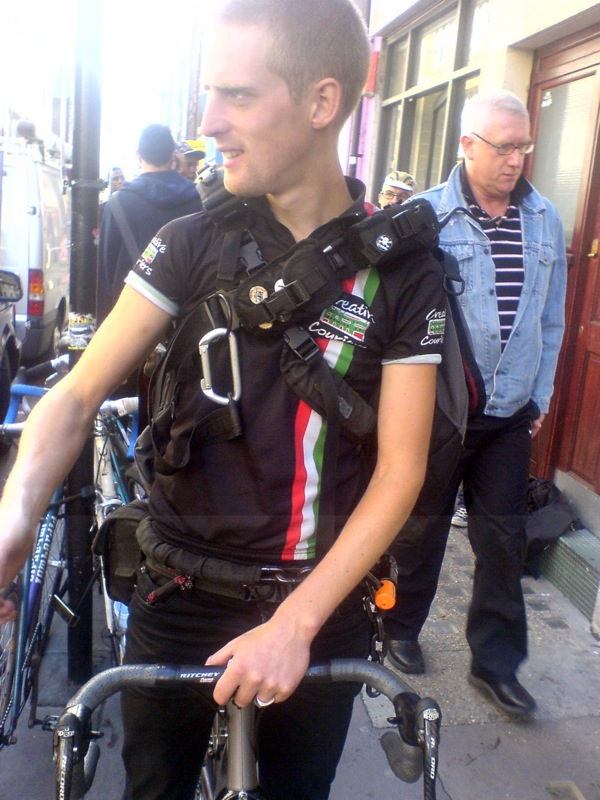
London bicycle messenger

A messenger bag (also called a courier bag) is a type of sack, usually made of cloth (natural or synthetic). It is worn over one shoulder with a strap that goes across the chest resting the bag on the lower back. While messenger bags are sometimes used by couriers, they are now also an urban fashion icon. Some types of messenger bags are called carryalls. A smaller version is often called a sling bag.

== History ==
This design of bag has been used in the transportation of mail and goods by numerous types of messengers, including Pony Express riders, postal workers, messengers on foot (especially in ancient times), and bicycle couriers. Some Royal Mail carriers currently use large messenger bags to deliver mail in lieu of a postbag.

Pre-dating today's messenger bags described herein as specifically for bicycle messengers, fashion brands had been creating "messenger style" bags modelled after military map case bags and document pouches featuring a shoulder strap intended for wear across the chest for over a century.

== Use ==
Similar in function to backpacks, messenger bags ensure comfort for people carrying heavy and/or bulky items, while allowing easy access to the contents.

They typically incorporate features that make them suitable for cycling. Such features may include fittings for easy adjustment of the shoulder strap, quick release buckles, an adjustable hinged buckle on the strap, and the ability to attach accessories, such as lights, phone holsters, or U-locks. The top-opening one-strap design allows messenger bags to be easily swung around front so that their contents can be accessed without removing the bag.

A true messenger bag includes a second, thinner, stabilising strap that is fastened either around the rider's waist or diagonally across the chest. Without a stabilising strap, the bag tends to swing around to the rider's front, making pedalling difficult.

Messenger bags are often used as a fashion accessory. Messenger bags have become fashionable in urban environments, among students, cyclists and commuters. Many college and high-school students and bicycle commuters use them for fashionable and functional purposes. Many companies design messenger bags specifically for the collegiate market. Compared to a backpack, it is easier to place and remove text-books, notebooks and supplies from a messenger bag because they can be easily shifted to the side of the body, providing better accessibility. Messenger bags provide more weather resistance than leather satchel-style school bags.

== Construction ==
Materials used in messenger bags are often more durable and water-resistant than other over-the-shoulder bags. Contemporary bags use thicker gauges of waxed canvas and tarp shielding for the inner waterproof lining. Other materials include ballistic nylon, vinyl waterproof tarpaulin lining used to make the bag waterproof. The liner provides the support structure for the bag; this keeps the bag from falling over on itself. Some companies eschew the standard PVC waterproof lining for compounds such as thermoplastic polyurethanes, which are more expensive, more durable, more environmentally friendly, and less volatile.

== See also ==
- Hunting bag
- Handbag
- Mail bag
- Satchel
- Tote bag
- Camera bag
