= Hunting bag =

Bag used by hunters to carry equipment

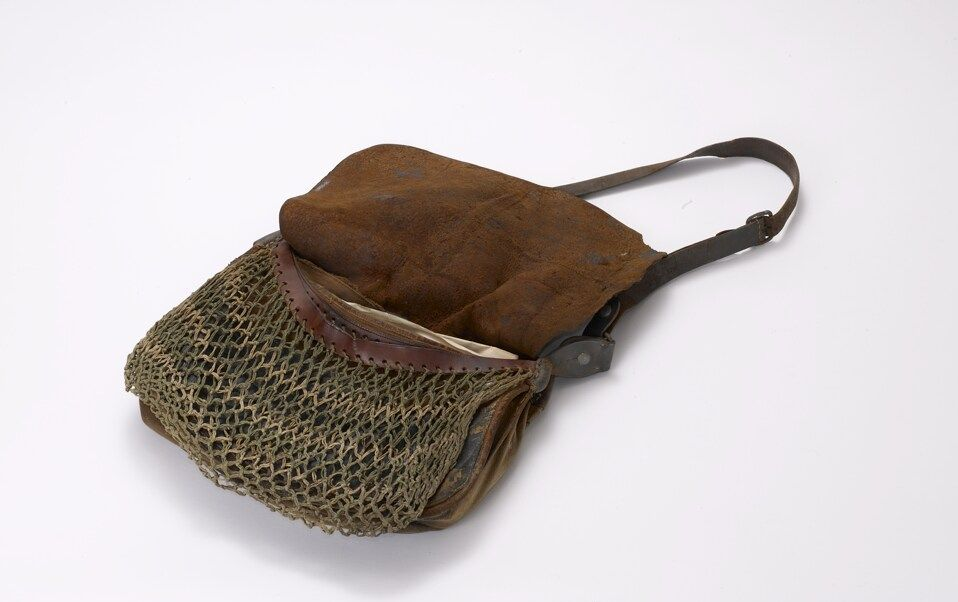
Hunting bag, from the Departmental Museums of Haute-Saône

A hunting bag is a bag used by the hunter to transport their equipment, food and hunting accessories, e.g. cartridges, etc. Made of leather or fabric, the satchel is generally equipped with a large strap passed around the neck to hang it over the shoulder. There are hunting jackets with an integrated pouch on the back.

== Description ==
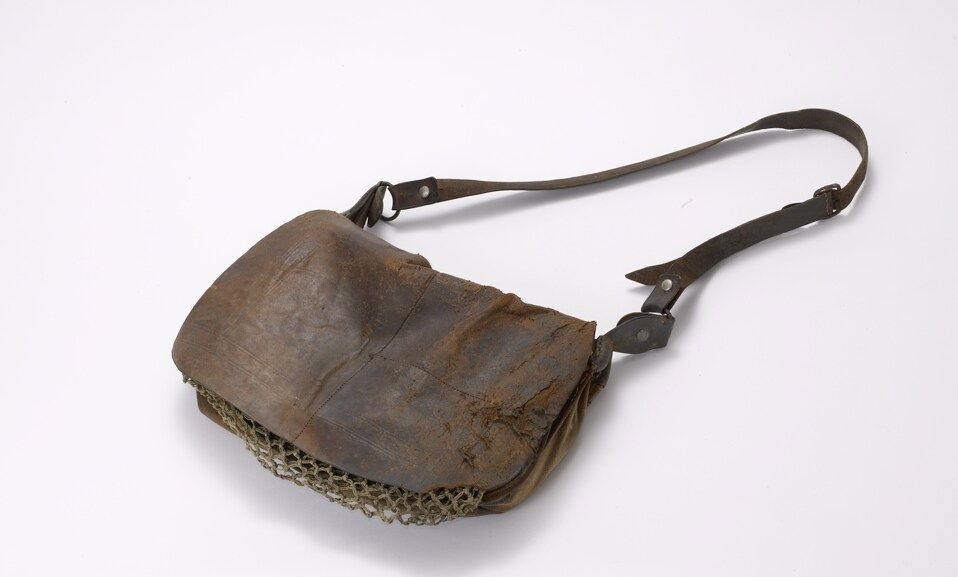
Hunting bag, from the Departmental Museums of Haute-Saône

Hunting bags are traditionally made of strong leather and worn over the shoulder on a wide strap. They are rectangular and contain compartments for small items, which are protected by the bag's lid, which is usually large. There are strings usually attached to it, (sometimes with rings in its end) to hang dead birds. For short-term hunts, the so-called American hunting bags, which have a square-round-oblong shape, are the most convenient.

== Bibliography ==
- Ягдаш // Энциклопедический словарь Брокгауза и Ефрона :v 86 t. (82 tons and 4 copies). — SBB., 1890—1907.
- Ягдташ // Товарный словарь / И. А. Пугачёв (главный редактор). — М.: Государственное издательство торговой literaturы, 1961. —T. IX. — Стб. 976-977.
