= Fendi (disambiguation) =

Fendi is an Italian fashion house.

Fendi may also refer to:

== People ==
- Anna Fendi (born 1933), Italian fashion designer and entrepreneur, sister of Carla Fendi
- Carla Fendi (1937–2017), Italian fashion executive and philanthropist
- Peter Fendi (1796–1842), Austrian painter, engraver, and lithographer
- Fendi Al-Fayez (1800–1879), Arab leader and sovereign emir
- Fendi Onobun (born 1986), American former football tight end

== Other uses ==
- Fendi, Algeria, a village
- Fendi (song), a song by Russian hip-hop singer Rakhim
- "Fendi", a song by American rapper PnB Rock
