= Valentino Ready-to-Wear runway collections =

Biannual showcase collection

Valentino S.p.A.
- Type: Joint Stock Company
- Industry: Fashion
- Founded: 1960; 66 years ago Rome, Italy
- Founder: Valentino Garavani
- Headquarters: Via Turati, 16/18, Milan, Italy
- Key people: Stefano Sassi (CEO)
- Products: accessories; clothing; footwear; glasses; perfumes; watches
- Net income: 261.5 million euro (2007)
- Owner: Qatar Mayhoola for Investments Spc
- Website: www.valentino.com

The Valentino Ready-to-Wear collection is a showcased biannual collection for spring-summer and autumn-winter seasons during Paris Fashion Week to an audience of media, retailers, buyers, investors, and customers, under the auspices of the Chambre Syndicale du Prêt-à-Porter des Couturiers et des Créateurs de Mode, which is one of three trade associations affiliated with the Fédération française de la couture, du prêt-à-porter des couturiers et des créateurs de mode.

== Spring 2012 ==
The Valentino Ready-to-Wear Spring 2012 Collection was presented on October 3, 2011, by creative directors Maria Grazia Chiuri and Pierpaolo Piccioli. Piccioli told Vogue, "Fashion is a dream, and in this moment we need dreams".

Mexico in the early part of the twentieth century served as inspiration—not so much the geography, but rather place as a state of mind. Their mood boards referenced works by Georgia O'Keeffe, Tina Modotti, and Deborah Turbeville.

"Women that had a more personal kind of beauty, very sensual, and sensitive," Chiuri explained to WWD during a preview. "It's all about organic textures but in a very simple shape with the memory of couture."

With a slightly folkloric feeling, design details included puffed shoulders, long sleeves, hemlines that fell just above the ankle, floral prints, and velvet flower appliqués. WWD described the collection as romantic and feminine, with ladylike silhouettes.

The collection featured 55 looks. Bette Franke opened the show and Freja Beha Erichsen closed it. Jessica Biel, Alexa Chung, Anna Dello Russo, Ciara, Natalia Vodianova, and Rachel Zoe attended the show.

== Fall 2012 ==
The Valentino Ready-to-Wear Fall 2012 Collection was presented on March 5, 2012, by creative directors Maria Grazia Chiuri and Pierpaolo Piccioli. Folklore and artisanship provided the inspiration and direction. Silhouettes included hussar capes, military coats, childlike vests, cocoons, jumpsuits, and long dresses. Hemlines fell from knee-length skirts to ankle-length pants. The palette included white, black, beige, blue, and red. Fabrications ranged from leather, wool, cady, and astrakhan to chiffon, tulle, lace, and sequins. With patchwork furs and exotic embroideries, WWD described the collection as folk in a very contemporary way. The collection's mood board referenced Janis Joplin, Penelope Tree, and Twiggy.

According to Vogue UK, the designers wanted to "focus on globetrotting and searching for one's roots" with "rediscovered local allure transformed into global synthesis" taking in "an imaginative journey, exploring different knowledge, inconographies and traditions with a keen eye and rapid movements" while " indulging in tactile artisan craftsmanship", which sounds more than a little convoluted in words but played out beautifully in clothes. The collection blended signature girlieness with utilitarian masculinity.

The presentation featured 58 looks. Vanessa Axente opened the runway show and Kati Nescher closed it.Alicia Keys, Natalia Vodianova, Caroline Sieber, Nicky Hilton, Harley Viera-Newton, Genevieve Jones, and Manuela Pavesi attended the show.

== Spring 2013 ==
The Valentino Ready-to-Wear Spring 2013 Collection was presented on October 1, 2012, by creative directors Maria Grazia Chiuri and Pierpaolo Piccioli. According to Vogue Runway, the designers were inspired by their memories of Rome, specifically a recent exhibit by photographer Roman Arturo Ghergo. The collection felt more intimate than previous seasons with a foundation of embellished slipdresses, handpainted floral dresses, and Valentino red gowns.

As told to WWD, "We take a lot of inspiration from Rome," said Chiuri during a preview. "In some ways, our idea of it is not so beautiful. But for us, the city and fashion are about dreams."

Hemlines were below the knee or longer. The palette included ivory, blush, powder, geranium, rouge, navy, tobacco, and black. Fabrications used ranged from chiffon, silk, lace to cotton, georgette, and brocade. The modest silhouette was light and ladylike, with knee-length and long-line dresses layered over petticoats, accessorized by light coats, clear slingbacks, plexiglass mary janes, and lucite minaudieres. Design details varied from lace and ruffled bibs, puffed sleeves, studded, and snakeskin accents. A remix of Vivaldi's Four Season's provided the runway soundtrack. The collection featured 63 looks. Esther Heesch opened the runway presentation and Ondria Hardin closed it. Valentino Garavani, Jennifer Lopez, Delfina Delettrez Fendi, Giovanna Battaglia, Rachel Zoe, Eugenie Niarchos, Shala Monroque, and Jessica Stam attended the show.

== Fall 2013 ==
The Valentino Ready-to-Wear Fall 2013 Collection was presented on March 4, 2013, by creative directors Maria Grazia Chiuri and Pierpaolo Piccioli. The collection was inspired by Flemish masters and Dutch painters, specifically Johannes Vermeer's Girl with a Pearl Earring. With portrait necklines, a-line shifts, and short alpaca coats Vogue Runway described the collection as austere and severe. Most reviews singled out the China blue Delft ceramic print gowns, which were inspired by a 1968 design from the eponymous founder, Valentino. Lengths varied from mini to maxi. The palette included black, white, grey, scarlet, green, blue, and yellow. Fabrications ranged from fur, mohair, alpaca, and brocade, to lace, chiffon, organdie, and silk. Vogue Italia described the silhouettes as curved and dainty.

The collection featured 67 looks. Erika Labanauskaite opened the runway presentation and Maud Welzen closed it. Frank Ocean, Jessica Alba, Tallulah Harlech, Derek Blasberg, Nicole Richie, Jessica Hart, Elettra Wiedemann, Pace Wu, Miroslava Duma, and Laure Heriard Dubreuil attended the show.

== Spring 2014 ==
The Valentino Ready-to-Wear Spring 2014 Collection was presented on September 30, 2013, by creative directors Maria Grazia Chiuri and Pierpaolo Piccioli. Maria Callas as Medea was included on the mood board as a muse. Vogue Runway described the collection as darker and more mysterious than the previous season, "a fashion opera." The collection motifs referenced Roman heritage and Native American, with embroidery, fringe, geometric, and medallion design details.

Hemlines extended from mini to floor length. The palette included black, blue, burgundy, aubergine, brown, green, red, and coral. The fabrications ranged from suede, cotton, brocades, and jacquards to chiffon, silk, organza, and satin. Vogue Italia described the silhouettes as monastic, austere, amphora-shaped, with geometric and asymmetric capes.

The presentation featured 72 looks. Malaika Firth opened and closed the runway presentation. Clotilde Courau, Angie Harmon, Ciara, Alexandre de Betak, Tallulah Harlech, Jessica Hart, Kozue Akimoto, Giovanna Battaglia, Anna Dello Russo, Dasha Zhukova, Miroslava Duma, and Hanneli Mustaparta attended the show.

== Fall 2014 ==
The Valentino Ready-to-Wear Fall 2014 Collection was presented on March 4, 2014, by creative directors Maria Grazia Chiuri and Pier Paolo Piccioli.

This season the design duo was inspired by a series of 60's Roman female artists: Giosetta Fioroni, Carol Rama, and Carla Accardi. As toldto Vogue Runway, "They were rule breakers," the designers said beforehand. "Nobody believed that women could be artists."

The hemlines varied from knee-length to floor-length. The palette included: grey, white, brown, green, pink, orange, blue, and red. Fabrications ranged from wool, leather, fur, and shearling to silk, taffeta, lace, and crepe. The streamlined silhouette focused on high-waisted and a-line shapes with wide trousers, kimono shapes, and long, flowing dresses. Design details included gathered waists and caped backs.

The collection featured 71 looks, Maartje Verhoef opened the runway presentation and Ine Neefs closed it. Valentino Garavani, Giancarlo Giammeti, Pauline Ducruet, Bianca Brandolini d'Adda, Dasha Zhukova, Giovanna Battaglia, Anna Dello Russo, Miroslava Duma, and Olivia Palermo attended the show.

== Spring 2015 ==
The Valentino Ready-to-Wear Spring 2015 Collection was presented on September 30, 2014, by creative directors Maria Grazia Chiuri and Pierpaolo Piccioli. According to Vogue Runway, the collection was inspired by many of Italy's patrimonies, from its antiquities to its kitsch, country interiors influenced a series of colorful printed dresses with vivid flowers and arabesque forms. "In this moment when everything is synthetic, digital, and flat, you need something more human. To dream, you need to feel something, not just to see," said Piccioli. The show notes described the collection as the "Grand Tour--a voyage, an educational trip taken by cultured young Europeans to explore the art, philosophy and traditions of Italy." This inspiration was coupled was an ocean theme with seashells, coral, sea horses, and starfish prints.

As explained to WWD, "It's a journey, but a reflection about what we are," said Piccioli backstage. "It's a release of joy and stream of consciousness; fragments of memory."

Silhouettes included tailored linen jackets; dresses in Baroque scarf prints; florals that looked like stained glass; backless pinafores; intricate eveningwear, and embroidered gowns. Hemlines ranged from mini to calf and maxi. The pallette included white, black, indigo, pink, yellow, military green, and cinnamon. The collection was accessorized by flat sandals, gladiators, bucket bags, dainty jewellery, and patterned scarves.

The collection included 79 looks. Yana Van Ginneken opened the runway presentation and Maartje Verhoef closed it. Ciara, Johannes Huebl, Olivia Palermo, Giancarlo Giammetti, Elena Perminova, Hannah Bronfman, Ulyana Sergeenko, Ji-Woo Choi, and Atlanta de Cadenet Taylor attended the show.

== Fall 2015 ==
The Valentino Ready-to-Wear Fall 2015 Collection was presented on March 10, 2015, by creative directors Maria Grazia Chiuri and Pierpaolo Piccioli. This season, the design duo was inspired by artists and muses Emilie Flöge and Celia Birtwell. The former was muse to Gustav Klimt and the latter inspired her husband, designer Ossie Clark. Celia Birtwell not only served as a muse; she collaborated with the designers on their Pre-Fall collection. Floge's influence gave way to a-line silhouettes, gold-leaf effects, and quilted velvet; while Celia Birtwell assisted with the dragon motif.

As told to WWD, "Women can be multifaceted," said Chiuri backstage. "They can be muses, they can be artists. And our collections speak about this in a simple way."

The collection had a graphic black and white quality to it with horizontal stripes, checks, and triangles. The palette also featured brighter hues of burgundy, pink, green, and yellow in chevron patterns. Lengths varied from knee to ankle and floor-length. The fabrications ranged from wool, crepe, snakeskin, suede, and fur to chiffon, tulle, lace, satin, and knits. A-line dresses, maxi panels, flared bottoms, sheaths, tunics, trench coats, and capes were accented by pleated ruffles, jet beading, and metallic wire.

The collection featured 84 looks. Paula Galecka opened and closed the runway presentation. Ben Stiller and Owen Wilson also made an appearance on the runway. Kate Mara, Garance Doré, Elena Perminova, Chiara Ferragni, Anna Dello Russo, Nicky Hilton, and Valeria Golino attended the show.

== Spring 2016 ==
The Valentino Ready-to-Wear Spring 2016 Collection was presented on October 6, 2015, by creative directors Maria Grazia Chiuri and Pierpaolo Piccioli. This season the designers were inspired by Africa, more specifically the humanitarian crisis that has led to thousands of refugees fleeing Senegal, Nigeria, Eritrea, Mali, and Gambia for Italy. The African influence translated to the textiles and design details with tribal scenes, leather treatments, ceramic pagan necklaces, beaded Masai-derived patterns, bold peacock feather trims, and indigenous motifs. They also referenced Picasso and Braque's embrace of African art in the 1920s, with layers of suede fringing and tie-dye patterns used as a camouflage-like material.

As told to Vogue Runway, "We probably feel that the greatest privilege in doing our work is that fashion can give a message," said Chiuri. "We think every person coming here is an individual, and we can show that we can improve ourselves by understanding other cultures."

"The message," added Piccioli, "is tolerance. And the beauty that comes out of cross-cultural expression."

As told to WWD, "After Roma we really felt that we had to let our eyes travel somewhere else," said Piccioli before the show, noting that immigration is a defining factor of the times. "This is the time to see the integration of different cultures, to create new balances between our safe aesthetic and crossing a new culture."

Hemlines varied from short to long. The palette included black, ebony, nude, green, and red. Fabrications ranged from lace, tulle, feathers, and silk to leather, suede, jersey, and cotton. Featured silhouettes included cropped jackets, straight skirts, pleated minis, long gowns, beaded bodices, and columnar dresses. The theme song from Out of Africa provided the runway soundtrack.

The collection featured 89 looks. Cameron Traiber opened the runway presentation and Julia Nobis closed it.

== Fall 2016 ==
The Valentino Ready-to-Wear Fall 2016 Collection was presented on March 8, 2016, by creative directors Maria Grazia Chiuri and Pierpaolo Piccioli. The collection was inspired by ballet and the modern dance movement. The design duo also cited the 1969 dance film, They Shoot Horses, Don't They? With references to choreographers Martha Graham, Merce Cunningham, Diaghilev, and the Ballets Russes the silhouettes featured dresses layered over tutus over sweaters and footless tights; the grand finale featured glitter-sprinkled tulle costumes.

As told to Vogue Runway, "We always think fashion is cultural, not just about delivering clothes," said Chiuri. "We want this show to be about living your moments, feeling each moment uniquely. I really love fashion. This job we do is a good opportunity to describe the time we're in."

As told to WWD, "Everybody is speaking about 'see and buy,'" said Chiuri backstage. "We think that to be in the moment is more important. You can see and you can feel as well. You can also buy, but it is not true that fashion is only to buy." Chiuri and Piccioli emphasized the intangible pricelessness of a "shared show experience" as we know it, creating something that sparks emotion in the buyers, the press, and others who devote their time to the process, which compels them to share what they saw and felt.

Like Chanel and Saint Laurent, this collection seemed to react against the instantaneous of social media. According to the show notes, Chiuri and Piccioli aimed to "offer a reply to chaos and to the uncertainty of present times, stepping away from virtuality in order to discover the essence of the contemporary in the unrepeatable physicality of an emotion: in experiences that need to be truly lived, in person, and that no digital instrument can fully reinstate."

Critics lauded the collection's variety—a belted gold velvet dress layered over a blush turtleneck; a silver fringed sweater atop a gold-fringed skirt; and bad-girl black swans in tulle, leather and gold-star embroideries. The finale gave way to ingenues in the tea-stained, ruffled tulle dresses and sparkly sweetheart-shaped bodices. Design details included beadwork, feathers, and intricate embroideries. The palette included black, white, nude, camel, grey, and yellow. Fabrications ranged from silk, tulle, georgette, and cashmere to leather, velvet, wool, and fur. The silhouette was focused, coats and capes layered over fluid shapes; slip dresses layered over knits and long dresses accented by ruffles and ruching. The ensembles were accessorized by combat boots, embellished pumps, velvet sandals, quilted handbags, and silver amulets.

Instead of a recorded soundtrack, pianist Vanessa Wagner played works by John Cage and Philip Glass on a baby grand from the middle of the runway. The collection featured 81 looks. Paulina Frankowsa opened the runway presentation and Bara Podzimkova closed it. Sofia Sanchez de Betak, Giancarlo Giammetti, Melanie Thierry, Jeanne Damas, Miroslava Duma, Lisa Marie Fernandez, Karen Elson, Jessica Hart, and Dakota Fanning attended the show.

== Spring 2017 ==
The Valentino Ready-to-Wear Spring 2017 Collection was presented on October 2, 2016, by creative director Pierpaolo Piccioli at a salon in the Hotel Salomon de Rothschild; it was his first solo collection after Maria Grazia Chiuri departed for Christian Dior. Piccioli was dually inspired by medieval art, specifically Hieronymus Bosch's triptych,The Garden of Earthly Delights and British fashion designer, Zandra Rhodes.

As told to Vogue Runway, "He was wonderful," exclaimed Rhodes, who was sitting in the front row today. "He and an assistant came to my studio for two days, I showed them everything in my archive, and he asked me what I could do to make prints from the Bosch painting. It's just incredible to see what they did with them."

For the most part, hemlines were long. The palette included black, white, pink, chartreuse, yellow, and green. Fabrications ranged from wool, leather, velvet, and fur to lace, georgette, chiffon, and cotton. Featured silhouettes varied from tunics with dresses to bustiers with wide-leg pants.

The designer presented 64 looks. Noemie Abigail opened the presentation and Rianne van Rompaey closed it. Franca Sozzani, Anna Dello Russo, Giovanna Battaglia Engelbert, Eugenie Niarchos, Bianca Brandolini d'Adda, Noor Fares, Diane Kruger, Shailene Woodley, Dakota Fanning, Kaleigh Sperry, Miles Teller, Jessica Alba, Hailee Steinfeld, Lily Collins, Lauren Santo Domingo, Liya Kebede, and Olivier Rousteing attended the show.

== Fall 2017 ==
The Valentino Ready-to-Wear Fall 2017 Collection was presented on March 5, 2017, by creative director Pierpaolo Piccioli. The designer cited disparate inspirations: Victoriana and the Memphis eighties design movement; the former influenced the silhouette with long, high-waisted and high-neck blouses with romanticism; and the latter influenced the palette and graphic patterns.

The majority of the collection featured long dresses and evening gowns. The palette included black, green, red, blue, and pink. Fabrications varied from lace, tulle, and chiffon to leather, velvet, sequins, and wool. The collection was accessorized by coral necklaces, knee-high boots, military boots, mink sandals, and chain strap handbags.

There were 61 looks in the collection. Skylar Tartz opened the show, while Faretta closed it. Elisabeth von Thurn und Taxis, Kate Mara, Kate Foley, Laure Hériard Dubreuil, Hannah Bronfman, Virginie Ledoyen, Natalia Vodianova, Kristin Scott Thomas, and Christian Louboutin attended the show.

== Spring 2018 ==
The Valentino Ready-to-Wear Spring 2018 Collection was presented on October 1, 2017, by creative director Pierpaolo Piccioli in the courtyard of the Lycee Carnot. The collection was partially inspired by the Apollo Moon landing.

As told to Vogue Runway, "I wanted to get back something of the glamour of the '80s that Mr. Valentino did so well," Piccioli said.

During a preview with WWD, Piccioli talked about the Moon as a physical place, "Where you can find what's lost in the heart, this romantic idea of the moon, the moon as a second chance." Piccioli also cited the Renaissance poem, The Frenzy of Orlando, as an inspiration.

"I was very impressed by the part when Orlando loses his mind for love, and his best friend has to go to the moon to recover his sanity," Piccioli told British Vogue in a preview at Place Vendôme. "It's important, because the moon is the place where you can find what is lost in the heart. I like this idea of the moon as a second opportunity."

The season's silhouettes included luxe sportswear pieces such as parkas, anoraks, silver sweatshirts, and cargo pants, but there were also trapeze short dresses, apron dresses, and romantic dresses. The palette included blush, pistachio, lavender, yellow, burgundy, fuchsia, white, and black.

The collection featured 76 looks. Cosima Fritz opened the runway presentation, while Ratner closed it. Valentino Garavani, Zoey Deutch, Emily Robinson, Alexa Chung, Arizona Muse, Jeanne Damas, Emily Ratajkowski, Carla Bruni, Aymeline Valade, Robin Wright, Hopper Penn, Alber Elbaz, Stefano Tonchi, Marion Cotillard, and Natalia Vodianova attended the show.

== Fall 2018 ==
The Valentino Ready-to-Wear Fall 2018 Collection was presented on March 4, 2018, by creative director Pierpaolo Piccioli. There were references to 80's-power-woman with padded shoulders, scalloped edges, and a vibrant palette.

As told to WWD, "Romanticism," said Piccioli. "It's a strength today, if you're able to be assertive but not aggressive." Piccioli said during a preview, "As an individual, personal, passionate approach to life. I think that is a real strength today, to be able to be fierce, to be strong and gentle at the same time, not to be aggressive but to be assertive. I started this collection with this idea of romanticism as a strength and not as a fragility."

One of the collection's key design elements included oversized flowers, petal-like folds, embroideries, large graphics, and floral intarsia. The silhouettes were enveloping and protective—gathered hoods, capes, and voluminous shapes. The hemlines varied from midi to ankle-length. Fabrications include crepe, organza, wool, and georgette. The palette included blush, scarlet, cerulean, red, green, and mustard.

"Sometimes it feels as if women have to renounce their femininity to be stronger. I don't think you need to be authoritarian to be assertive," Piccioli argued in a preview with British Vogue the day before. "We used to think of romanticism as something fragile, something close to love, but for me romanticism means an individual approach to life more passionate, more emotional, more human. Today, romanticism is not a weakness, it's a strength. You can be assertive and not be aggressive. To me, being romantic today means being stronger."

"It's not romantic in a sweet way, it's romantic in a bold way," Piccioli added. "Sometimes it's felt as if women had to dress like men to be more powerful. Today is a different moment. People can be exactly how they are. They don't have to renounce the way they are while being assertive. If you take the rules of someone you criticize, it's not good for anyone."

Björk's "Isobel" provided the runway soundtrack. The collection featured 67 looks. Adut Akech opened the show and Assa Baradji closed it. Alexia Niedzielski, Amelia Windsor, Ava Phillippe, Dakota Fanning, Dylan Penn, Juergen Teller, Karlie Kloss, Kristin Scott Thomas, Liya Kebede, and Tessa Thompson attended the show.

== Spring 2019 ==
The Valentino Ready-to-Wear Spring 2019 Collection was presented on September 30, 2019, by creative director Pierpaolo Piccioli at the Hotel des Invalides.

As told to Vogue, "I was thinking of paradises, about artists' colonies of the past," said Piccioli. "There were reasons why artistic people went off to places like that—so they could live their identities," he said. "Today, everyone is talking about escapism. But I don't believe in that—I think everyone should just live their identities in the city, or wherever they are."

The show notes indicated that Piccioli was inspired by the freedom to be oneself.

Inspired by the free-spirited, early 20th-century Maverick artists' colony in Woodstock, New York, Piccioli told Vogue Italia, "Today you have to be free, to be yourself in your place. You don't have to escape… beautiful means a diversity of expressions of yourself." He explained, "I wanted to create pieces that are not ordinary and basic, so with the memory of couture but for contemporary life. Simplicity is not the starting point, but the arrival point. For me, when you solve complexity you arrive at simplicity."

The collection was also influenced by Marrakech as viewed by Yves Saint Laurent and Henri Matisse and Paul Gauguin's time in Tahiti. With a 60's bent, the collection opened with a series of black taffeta gowns with balloon sleeves before shifting to feather accessories, dramatic florals, a series of sequined and tulle looks, mini dresses, leather capes, lace pajama sets, and wide-leg suits. The palette included burnt-orange, berry, oxblood, fuchsia, aqua, white, and black.

Kristen McMenamy opened the presentation of 63 looks, while Adut Akech closed it. Mariacarla Boscono, Vittoria Ceretti, Julie Hoomans, Kaia Gerber, Natalie Ogg, Hannah Motler, Liu Wen, and Elibeidy Dani also walked the show. The presentation, which received a standing ovation was attended by Izabel Goulart, Sofia Sanchez de Betak, Freida Pinto, Kristin Scott Thomas, and Olivia Wilde.

== Fall 2019 ==
The Valentino Ready-to-Wear Fall 2019 Collection was presented on March 4, 2019, by creative director Pierpaolo Piccioli. This season, he collaborated with Jun Takahashi to create a series of collaged prints with florals and 19th neoclassical sculptures. He was also inspired by The Movement for the Emancipation for Poetry, which employs guerilla tactics to anonymously post pieces of poetry in public places.

As told to Vogue, "I feel that people are looking for emotion and dreams—but not distant dreams," Piccioli said before his ready-to-wear show. "I want to create a community for Valentino. I mean something different from 'lifestyle,' which is about owning objects. It's about people who share values."

Piccioli also commissioned Robert Montgomery, Greta Bellamacina, Mustafa The Poet, and Yrsa Daley-Ward to contribute to an anthology of poems, Valentino on Love.

The designer continued, "I started this collection thinking about poetry because poetry is similar to couture—it's something that can belong to both the past and to this time. You can find your own poetry through dress."

The booklets of collected poems were left on each audience member's seat. One poem excerpt was displayed on an illuminated boardboard at the runway entrance, it read, "The people you love become ghosts inside of you and like this you keep them alive." Piccioli also selected lines to be printed or embroidered inside the linings of his designs.

The designer incorporated statue prints and poetic verses to avoid a classically romantic translation only through florals with more alternate visuals. One mini dress was embroidered with the words "kiss me in this light while it still lasts," while another featured the words "I woke up and felt the night leaving. Desire looked strange in the light," and a black coat read "wrap me, free me, see me."

As told to WWD, "I think of poetry as something that is still beautiful, but it can be contemporary as well," Piccioli said during a preview, "to keep the values of couture while being contemporary, and making the brand relevant today."

Silhouettes included tunics, tulle dresses, tailored overcoats, hooded capes, and layered pantsuits. Design details featured couture shapes like sloped shoulders, rounded backs, and floor-length skirts as well as scalloped hems, and floral appliques. The palette ranged from pink, yellow, orange, and scarlet to moss, grey, black, and white.

"After the couture [show], I wanted to move away from safe territory. A change of silhouette," Piccioli explained during a preview with British Vogue, "I still want to keep the couture values in the house, but more daywear, more street, more inclusive."

Anok Yai opened the runway presentation of 62 looks, while Fran Summers closed it. Adut Akech, Kaia Gerber, Primrose Archer, Elibeidy Dani, Licett Morillo, Mariacarla Boscono, Vittoria Ceretti, Sara Grace Wallerstedt, and Yoon Young Bae also walked the show.

La La Anthony, Harley Viera-Newton, Alexa Chung, Katherine Langford, Sofia Sanchez de Betak, Gaia Repossi Greta Bellamacina, Robert Montgomery, Liya Kebede, Sofia Carson, Janelle Monáe, Jeanne Damas, and Naomi Campbell were amongst the front row guests.

== Spring 2020 ==
The Valentino Ready-to-Wear Spring 2020 Collection was presented on September 29, 2019, by creative director Pierpaolo Piccioli. He opened his presentation with a dozen white looks. As told to Vogue, "I wanted to work on something universal, to get back to the essence of shape and volume," Piccioli said. "So I worked on the idea of the white shirt, but treating it with a couture sensibility."

During a preview with WWD, Piccioli expounded on his creative process."Do you know this technique, called grisaille?" The 16th-century painting method is when an image is executed entirely in shades of grey, typically to intimate a statue or relief. "It consists of taking off in order to give life and shape and to go to the essence."

Bridget Foley of WWD describes Piccioli's belief that "Couture is about more than exquisitely wrought dresses that take forever to make and cost a fortune; that it is about a set of values of respect, aspiration and inclusivity, not in terms of purchasing power but in telegraphing messages of beauty and open-mindedness."

Despite comparisons to Valentino Garavini's 1968 All White collection, Piccioli has sought to modernize couture silhouettes by removing stiffness, incorporating more light and volume for fluidity. Silhouettes varied from tunics and shorts to capes and pencil skirts. This season's palette also included mauve, peach, plum before shifting to more vibrant neon hues in green, orange, and pink, while jungle and floral prints added another dimension. Design inspirations from Renaissance to Rousseau, gave way to pleats, ruffles, and feathers.

Adut Akech opened the runway presentation of 79 looks. Zandra Rhodes, Giancarlo Giammetti, Katherine Langford, Izabel Goulart, Alexa Chung, Moses Sumney, Olivia Palermo, Liya Kebede, and Naomi Campbell were amongst the front row guests.
