= Dan Thawley =

Dan Thawley is an Australian-born journalist, curator, and creative director. Thawley is the artistic director of Matter and Shape, a design salon in Paris, France. He was the former editor-in-chief of A Magazine Curated By and has served as a features editor of SSAW and Arena Homme + and has contributed to publications such Another, Architectural Digest, The Business of Fashion, Interview, New York Magazine The Cut, L'Uomo Vogue, Vogue, and Wallpaper. He lives and works in Paris, France.

== Work ==
Thawley was in a band when he lived in Australia and performing onstage marked his entry into fashion. He would go on to work at Ralph Lauren and then a boutique in Oxford Street in London, Assin. He received an honorary Doctorate from Aalto University in Helsinki, Finland in 2019.

The editor joined fashion title A Magazine Curated By as an online editor in 2009 and became editor-in-chief in 2010. He has curated issues with major fashion labels and designers including Kim Jones, Giambattista Valli, Rodarte, Delfina Delettrez Fendi, Thom Browne, Alessandro Michele, Eckhaus Latta, and Simone Rocha, amongst others.

Thawley authored Radical Renaissance, a 200-plus page book published by Assouline NYC in 2016.

In 2024, Thawley turned the online Matter and Shape into a physical space. The first iteration showcased the likes of Sacai, Flos, Bocci, Rick Owens, Alessi. The salon was staged during women's fashion week in the spring.
