= Valentino (fashion house) =

Italian luxury fashion house

Valentino S.p.A.
- Type: Società per azioni
- Industry: Fashion
- Founded: 1960; 66 years ago Rome, Italy
- Founder: Valentino Garavani
- Headquarters: Piazza Mignanelli Rome, Italy (creative); Via Turati 16/18 Milan, Italy (legal)
- Number of locations: 287 stores worldwide (2025)
- Key people: Jacopo Venturini (former CEO); Alessandro Michele (Creative director)
- Products: Clothing; Footwear; Glasses; Perfumes; Cosmetics; Watches; Accessories
- Revenue: €1.35 billion (2023)
- Owner: Mayhoola for Investments (70%); Kering (30%)
- Website: valentino.com

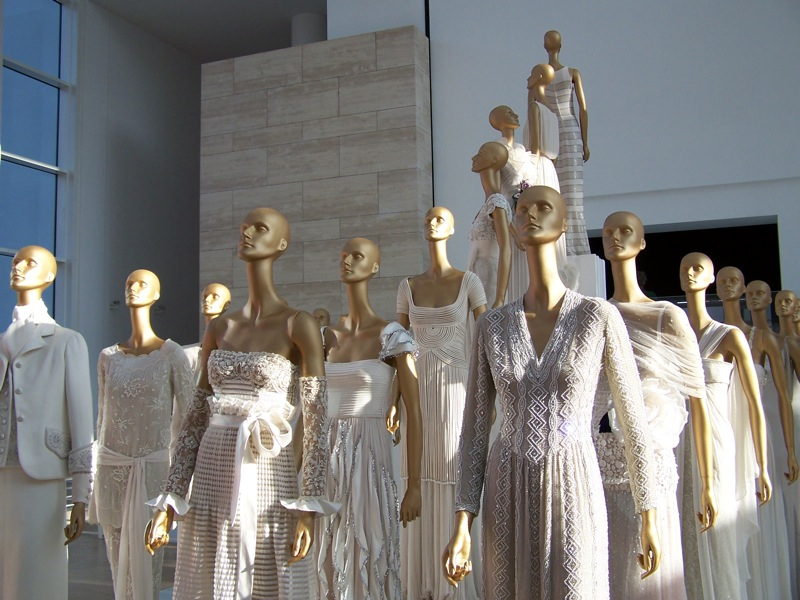
White Valentino dresses to celebrate Valentino's 45 years in fashion. Ara Pacis Museum, Rome.

Valentino S.p.A., also known as Maison Valentino, is an Italian luxury fashion house founded in 1960 by Valentino Garavani and part of the Valentino Fashion Group. The company has its registered office in Milan, while the creative direction and the Valentino Foundation is based in Rome, at Palazzo Gabrielli-Mignanelli. Jacob Venturini was the CEO of Valentino since 2020 and Alessandro Michele is the creative director since 2024. The group reported €1.31 billion in revenue in 2024.

== History ==
=== Early history ===
Valentino was founded in 1960, when Garavani opened a fashion house on Via Condotti in Rome, Italy, with the backing of his father and his father's associate Giancarlo Giammetti. In 1967 the maison established its headquarters at Palazzo Gabrielli-Mignanelli.

=== Rise to popularity ===
Valentino's international debut took place in 1962 in Florence, the Italian fashion capital of the time. Valentino gained popularity in 1967 after releasing their “no colour” collection which consisted of white, beige, and ivory apparels. The collection did not use any psychedelic patterns, a commonly used design feature during this time. The V logo was also introduced. In the years following the brand expanded to New York City and Ro The label staged the first Valentino menswear show at Milan Fashion Week in 1985.

Valentino has also, especially, designed wedding dresses for First Lady Jacqueline Bouvier Kennedy Onassis, Elizabeth Taylor, Anne Hathaway, Jennifer Lopez, Gwyneth Paltrow, Nicky Hilton, Courteney Cox, Sophie Hunter, Nicola Peltz Beatrice Borromeo, Queen Máxima of the Netherlands, Marie-Chantal, Crown Princess of Greece and Princess Madeleine of Sweden.

=== HdP Group, 1998–2002 ===
In 1998, Garavani and Giammetti sold the company for approximately $300 million to the Holding di Partecipazioni Industriali (HdP), an Italian conglomerate controlled, in part, by the late Gianni Agnelli, the head of Fiat. HdP put Valentino inside the same unit as the apparel producer GFT Net and alongside the sportswear manufacturer Fila.

In 2001, Opera – a fund controlled by the Rome jewelry firm Bulgari – started talks to buy Valentino, but pulled out after it was unable to agree on a price.

=== Marzotto Apparel, 2002–2007 ===
In 2002, Valentino S.p.A., with revenues of more than $180 million, was sold by HdP to Marzotto Apparel, a Milan-based textile giant, for $210 million. It was rumoured that HdP was displeased with Garavani's and Giammetti's personal expenses, a claim at which Giammetti has bristled. Following the acquisition, Michele Norsa became the company's CEO.

The Marzotto family, which controlled Valentino through several holding companies, including Tidus Srl and PFC Srl, spun off its fashion assets in 2005 to create Valentino Fashion Group.

In 2006, Stefano Sassi was appointed CEO, replacing Michele Norsa. He would later be partially responsible for the brand's renaissance in the 2010s.

=== Permira, 2007–2012 ===
From 2007, Valentino was controlled by private equity group Permira which had acquired the brand from the Marzotto Group for €2.6 billion ($3.5 billion). Later that year, Valentino and Giammetti announced that both would resign from the company in early 2008.

In 2007, Alessandra Facchinetti was named as the creative director of women's collections with Maria Grazia Chiuri and Pierpaolo Piccioli named as co-creative directors of the accessories. Maria Grazia Chiuri and Pierpaolo Piccioli took over Facchinetti's role the following year. Under their direction, Valentino introduced a modernised aesthetic that Vogue described as "fresh-faced girls in long, fragile dresses" and the success of the introduction of the "Rockstud" accessory line and "Rockrunner" sneakers.

In 2008, Valentino opened its first boutique in China, at the Peninsula Palace Hotel in Beijing. By December 2009, hit by the financial crisis, Valentino had to restructure its debt.

=== Mayhoola, 2012–present ===
In 2012, Qatari aristocrats acquired Valentino for €700 million through an investment vehicle called Mayhoola for Investments S.P.C. Mayhoola bought up both Permira's stake and Marzotto's minority interest.

In 2016, Maria Grazia Chiuri left Valentino to join Dior as creative director with Pierpaolo Piccioli becoming the sole creative director. Under Picciolo's direction, the fashion house would shift towards a more progressive image. In 2019, Valentino championed diversity by starring Adut Akech and Anwar Hadid in their advertising campaign for their "Born in Roma" fragrance. In 2020, Valentino adopted a co-ed model – the merging of men's and women's shows – for its presentations, a decision that was reversed in 2023. In January 2022, Valentino presented their Spring/Summer 2022 Haute Couture collection on models with a diverse range of body types.

In 2020, Jacopo Venturini replaced Stefano Sassi as CEO. Under his leadership, the fashion house announced that it would no longer use alpaca wool and severed ties with Mallkini, the world's largest privately owned alpaca farm in Peru. The move followed revelations of animal abuse within the alpaca industry. This was followed by going fur-free in 2022.

Valentino also decided to shutter Red Valentino, the fashion house's diffusion line, in aims of focusing on the company's core ready-to-wear and couture divisions. Their Fall/Winter 2023 collection would be the last for the line.

In 2023, Valentino earned the Education of Excellence Award at the CNMI Sustainable Fashion Awards for fostering education in Italy.

Kering purchased 30% of Valentino in July 2023, they intend to purchase the entire company by 2028.

In March 2024, Valentino announced the departure of creative director Pierpaolo Piccioli, as a joint decision. Following his departure, Valentino announced the appointment of Alessandro Michele as the next creative director. Michele rose to global recognition for executing a turn-around at Gucci during the 2010s centring on a quirky androgynous aesthetic. In June 2024, Valentino released images of Michele's first designs for Resort 2025. His debut runway show was during Paris Fashion Week for Spring/Summer 2025. Critical response to the collection has centred on the clear through-line with Michele's work at Gucci.

On 15 May 2025, one of the company's units, Valentino Bags Lab, was placed under court judicial administration in Italy for a year after exposure of worker abuse going on at the company.

== Other brands ==
=== Perfumes ===
Valentino's fragrances have included: Valentino Classique for women (1978), Vendetta By Valentino for women (1991), Very Valentino for women (1998), Very Valentino for Men (1999), Valentino Gold for women (2002), V for women (2005), Valentino V Absolu for women (2006), Valentino V Ete By Valentino for women (2006), Rock'n'Rose for women (2006), V pour Homme for men (2006), Rock n' Rose Couture for women (2007), and Valentina for women (2011).

In 2020, Valentino Beauty announced the release of a new perfume, Voce Viva, and announced Lady Gaga as its égérie.

From 2010 to 2018, Valentino Perfumes was licensed to Puig. Since then, it has been working with L'Oréal.

=== Eyewear ===
In addition to L’Oréal for beauty and fragrances, Valentino has only one other licence, for eyewear. For years, it worked with Marchon Eyewear and Luxottica (2017–2021). In 2021, the label signed a 10-year licence agreement with the Switzerland-based Akoni Group for the design, manufacture and worldwide distribution of the brand's prescription frames and sunglasses.

=== Red Valentino ===
In 2003, Maria Grazia Chiuri and Pierpaolo Piccioli, then accessories directors, launched a younger diffusion line called Red Valentino. Initially licensed to Sinv SpA, Valentino brought the line’s production in-house in 2009. By 2015, Red Valentino accounted for around 10 percent of Valentino Group’s sales. The line was discontinued in 2022.

== Governance ==
=== CEOs ===
- 2002–2006: Michele Norsa
- 2006–2020: Stefano Sassi
- 2020–2025: Jacopo Venturini
- Since 2025: Ricardo Bellini

=== Creative directors ===
- 1959–2007: Valentino Garavani
- 2007–2008: Alessandra Facchinetti
- 2008–2016: Maria Grazia Chiuri (alongside Pierpaolo Piccioli)
- 2008–2024: Pierpaolo Piccioli
- Since 2024: Alessandro Michele

== Financial data ==
Yearly results
| | Sales (billion €) |
|---|---|
| 2022 | 1.4 |
| 2023 | 1.35 |
| 2024 | 1.31 |

== Notable campaigns ==
For its advertisement campaigns, Valentino has in the past worked with photographers including Deborah Turbeville (2011) Terry Richardson (2016), Inez and Vinoodh (2020), Michael Bailey-Gates (2022) and Glen Luchford (2025).

For Valentino's Spring/Summer 2016 women's ready-to-wear collection, which referenced African culture, sporting prints and motifs commonly seen across the continent, photographer Steve McCurry shot a campaign set against the backdrop of Amboseli National Park in Kenya and included local Maasai people. The campaign sparked criticism on social media regarding perceived racial insensitivities.

== Legal issues ==
In 2020, Valentino and Amazon filed a joint lawsuit against New York-based Kaitlyn Pan Group for allegedly counterfeiting Valentino's Rockstud shoes and offering them for sale online.

Amid the COVID-19 pandemic in the United States, Valentino sought in June 2020 to end the lease for its American flagship on New York's Fifth Avenue nine years early, saying the pandemic made it impossible to run the store "consistent with the luxury, prestigious, high-quality reputation" of its neighbourhood. After a New York state trial judge dismissed that lawsuit, the landlord sued Valentino for $207.1 million, mainly to recover unpaid rent and to repair store damage. By 2023, Valentino settled litigation with the landlord.

== See also ==
- Black and white Valentino dress of Julia Roberts
- Valentino Ready-to-Wear runway collections
- Valentino: The Last Emperor
- Yellow Valentino dress of Cate Blanchett
