= Ilaria Venturini Fendi =

Italian fashion designer and entrepreneur

- Born: 7 April 1966 (age 58); Rome, Italy
- Occupation(s): Fashion designer and entrepreneur
- Parent(s): third daughter of Giulio Venturini and Anna Fendi

Ilaria Venturini Fendi is an Italian fashion designer and entrepreneur.

== Career ==
Following in the footstep of her mother Anna Fendi, formerly Creative Director of the Fendi brand, she was very young when she started her career in fashion after graduating from Istituto Europeo di Design. One of her first working experiences was with Karl Lagerfeld at Chanel in Paris. Back in Rome she entered the family firm becoming Accessories Creative Director of the Fendissime young line and also Fendi Shoe Designer, a position she maintained after the company was sold to the French group LVMH. While still loving her work very much, after some time she started feeling uneasy at the idea that every collection and the hard work behind it was doomed to become old right after its presentation. In 2003 she therefore decided to leave the family firm to dedicate herself to nature and the environment, a passion inherited in childhood from her father.

== Carmina Campus ==
She bought a country estate of about 430 acres in Northern Rome, I Casali del Pino, and while converting the farm to organic cultivation she became increasingly involved with environmental issues and creative reuse of wasted materials. Enlightened by this new awareness she created in 2006 her sustainable fashion and design brand Carmina Campus, that produces high-end bags, accessories and design objects with discarded materials and the manufacturing skills of Italian artisans. In 2009 she started a collaboration with the International Trade Centre (ITC), a UN - WTO agency that works in developing countries creating job opportunities in many industries. The program involved disadvantaged women's communities in Kenya and Uganda for the production of a special Carmina Campus bag line entirely made in Africa. The aim was to provide the workers with professional know-how in order to favor the creation of independent micro-entrepreneurs. She also collaborated with Socially MadeinItaly, an Italian non-profit organization that operates in Italian prisons, to support a joint rehabilitation program involving the production of a special Carmina Campus bag collection made in prison hubs that was first launched in February 2015. The project was certified by Italy's Ministry of Justice and initially involved four prison hubs that later became eleven. In December 2015 the project was presented in Palermo, Sicily, and then made available to the public in a store confiscated from the Mafia.

She was among the supporters of The Circle, the non-profit organization created in 2012 by Annie Lennox to promote and finance projects in favor of disadvantaged women and was among the co-founders of its spinoff, The Circle Italia.

== Awards ==
Year	Title
2010	Anter Award as Sustainable Fashion Entrepreneur, Florence
2011	World Fashion Grand Prize for Ethical Fashion Design created by Fashion4Development Program, Seoul
2012	Excellence in Ethical Business, Dallas
2013	Marisa Bellisario Award for Art and Design, Rome
2013	"ChièChiAward" Social Commitment Award, Milan
2017	Social Laureate Award created by Italy's Camera Nazionale della Moda and Ecoage, Milan
2017	ADI Social Design Award, Milan
