= Pierpaolo Piccioli =

Italian fashion designer

- Born: 29 August 1967 (age 59); Rome, Italy
- Education: Sapienza University of Rome
- Occupation: Fashion designer
- Children: 3

Pierpaolo Piccioli (born 29 August 1967) is an Italian fashion designer, who was the creative director of Valentino from 2008 to 2024, jointly with Maria Grazia Chiuri from 2008 to 2016. He was named creative director of Balenciaga in May 2025. He exited Balenciaga in November 2026, after under 2 years in the role.

== Early life ==
Piccioli was born in Rome and grew up in Nettuno.

Piccioli studied literature at Rome University, followed by a course in experimental fashion.

== Career ==
Early in their careers, Piccioli and Maria Grazia Chiuri worked together at Fendi for 10 years.

In 1999, Valentino Garavani selected both Piccioli and Chiuri to boost his brand's accessories category. They were promoted to creative directors of accessories at Valentino when Alessandra Facchinetti was assigned the same title for ready-to-wear after Garavani retired in 2007.

In 2008, Piccioli and Chiuri succeeded Facchinetti as creative directors of the brand. Their spring/summer 2011 introduction of a successful accessory, the Rockstud shoe, in particular helped drive brand revenues beyond the €1 billion mark.

During his tenure, Piccioli dressed stars like Florence Pugh and Rihanna for the Met Gala and Zendaya, Emily Blunt and Carey Mulligan for the Academy Awards. In 2022, he devoted almost an entire Valentino ready-to-wear collection to a new hot pink — called "Pink PP" after his initials — that proved a hit with celebrities and an effective viral marketing tool.

In 2023, Piccioli had a cameo role in Apple TV's The Morning Show (S3 E7).

In March 2024, Piccioli announced his departure from Valentino in a joint statement with the brand.

In May 2025, Piccioli announced his new position as Creative Director of Balenciaga.

In November 2026, Balenciaga announced Piccioli's departure from the brand.

== Recognition ==
In 2018 and 2022, Piccioli won "designer of the year" at The Fashion Awards.

== Personal life ==
Piccioli is married with three children, and lives in Nettuno, the coastal town where he was raised. He travels one hour to Rome for work.
