= Jacopo Venturini =

Italian business executive

Jacopo Venturini is an Italian executive. He was the CEO of Italian luxury fashion house Valentino, serving in the position from June 2020. He was previously the executive vice president of merchandising at Gucci.

Jacopo Venturini stepped down as CEO of Valentino on August 13, 2025.
