= Baguette (bag) =

Type of handbag

Baguettes are small, compact handbags, designed by Italian fashion company Fendi in 1997. Popularized on Sex and the City in the late 1990s and early 2000s, this product is often cited as the first It bag. With the Baguette, Fendi sparked the "buy-a-bag-a-day habit" by rapidly declining it into hundreds of different designs, selling more than a million units in 20 years.

== History ==
The Baguette concept was for a small, streamlined bag, carried on a short strap, that could be adapted for different looks, colors, and textures while still having a consistent aesthetic. It marked a contrast from many popular purses at the time, which were large totes. It was designed by Silvia Venturini Fendi.

Small and little-known, Fendi lent Baguettes as props for HBO's Sex and the City, a new show that was fast growing in popularity. In one of the episodes, Carrie Bradshaw gets mugged in a narrow street. The robber asks for her "bag", to which Carrie replies "it's a Baguette". Fendi was the first luxury house to lend a piece to Patricia Field, the show's costume designer and stylist. Sarah Jessica Parker has credited her bag for establishing the show and her character, Carrie Bradshaw, saying "Having Carrie wear the Baguette was a defining moment for us, and marked the beginning of everything". The success of the Baguette bag led LVMH to acquire Fendi in 1999.

In 2012, to celebrate the bag's 15th birthday and its +1000 original creations, Fendi organized an exhibition at the Colette store in Paris.

== Relaunch ==
In 2019, Fendi relaunched the Baguette bag, still designed by the creator of the original Baguette, Silvia Venturini Fendi. A few months later, Fendi partnered with the perfumer Francis Kurkdjian to launch the first-ever fragrance-infused bag. The scent was named ‘FendiFrenesia’ and influenced directly into the leather of Baguette bags (the scent lasts three years). A Baguette bag for men was also launched. The actresses Amanda Seyfried and Emma Roberts released a clip online, #BaguetteFriendsForever, where they explore a large room full of vintage and new Baguette bags.

== See also ==
- Kelly bag
- Courtauld bag
