= Palazzo Gabrielli-Mignanelli =

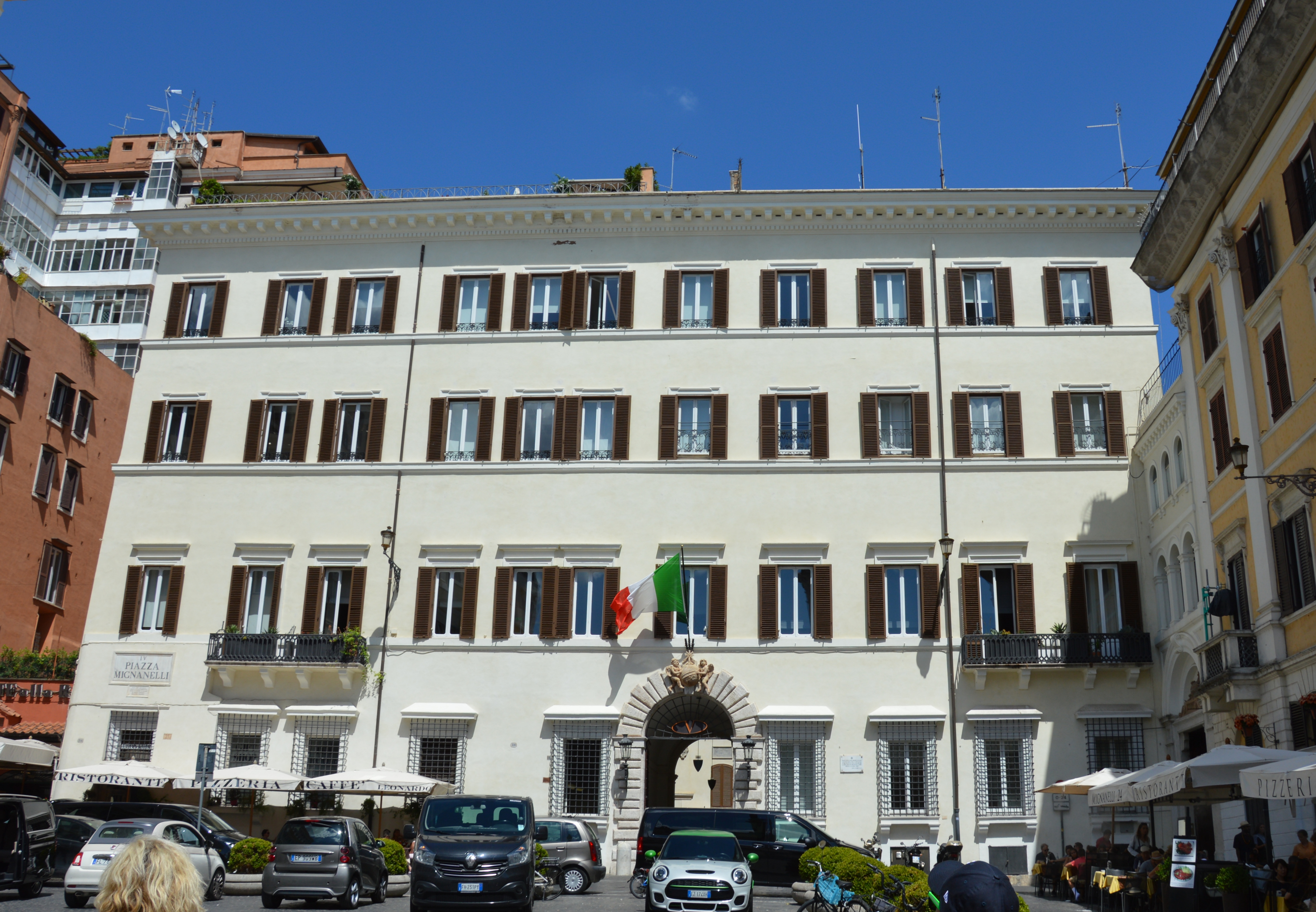
- Palazzo Gabrielli-Mignanelli, Roman headquarters of the Valentino fashion house
- Interactive map of the Palazzo Gabrielli-Mignanelli area

General information
- Location: Rome, Italy
- Coordinates: 41.9052°N 12.4837°E

Palazzo Gabrielli-Mignanelli is a late-Renaissance palace in Rome, Italy, overlooking Piazza Mignanelli and Piazza di Spagna.

The palace was built around 1575 by Alessandro Moschetti for count Girolamo Gabrielli, of a noble family from Gubbio. The chosen location was at the edge of the Pincian Hill, over what remained of the fabled gardens of Lucullus. In the 16th century the area was still considered periurban, and the palace was the first monumental building erected there.

As a result of the marriage between Carlo Gabrielli, Girolamo's nephew, and Maria Mignanelli, relative of cardinal Fabio Mignanelli, celebrated in 1615, the palace was presented by the Gabriellis to the Mignanellis, who owned the building until 1871 and gave their name to the square in front of the palace. After having been rented to different institutions from the late 18th century onwards, the building became the property of the Holy See in 1887, and on that occasion was restored and enlarged by Andrea Busiri Vici.

Palazzo Gabrielli-Mignanelli was residence of the late Valentino Garavani as well as the Roman headquarters of his maison.
