= Anna Fendi =

Italian fashion designer and entrepreneur

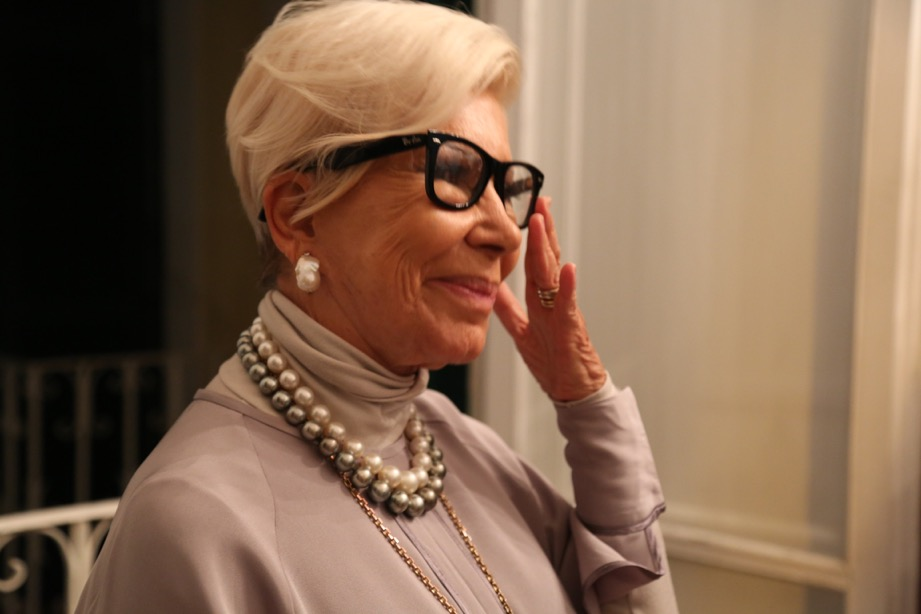
- Born: 23 March 1933 (age 93); Rome, Italy
- Parents: Edoardo Fendi (father); Adele Fendi (mother)
- Relatives: Carla Fendi; Paola Fendi; Franca Fendi; Alda Fendi; Silvia Venturini Fendi

Anna Fendi (born in Rome, 23 March 1933) is an Italian fashion designer and entrepreneur; she created the Fendi brand along with her sisters Alda, Carla, Franca and Paola.

She has two daughter: Silvia, Fendi's artistic director of accessories and menswear, and Ilaria, past Fendissime artistic director and shoe designer.

== Awards ==
Year	Title
1998	Knight of the Big Cross
2005	Career Award in Campidoglio
2008	Ettore Petrolini Award
2011	IWF Hall of Fame
2013	Fuoriclasse Castagner Award
