= Maria Grazia Chiuri =

Italian fashion designer (born 1964)

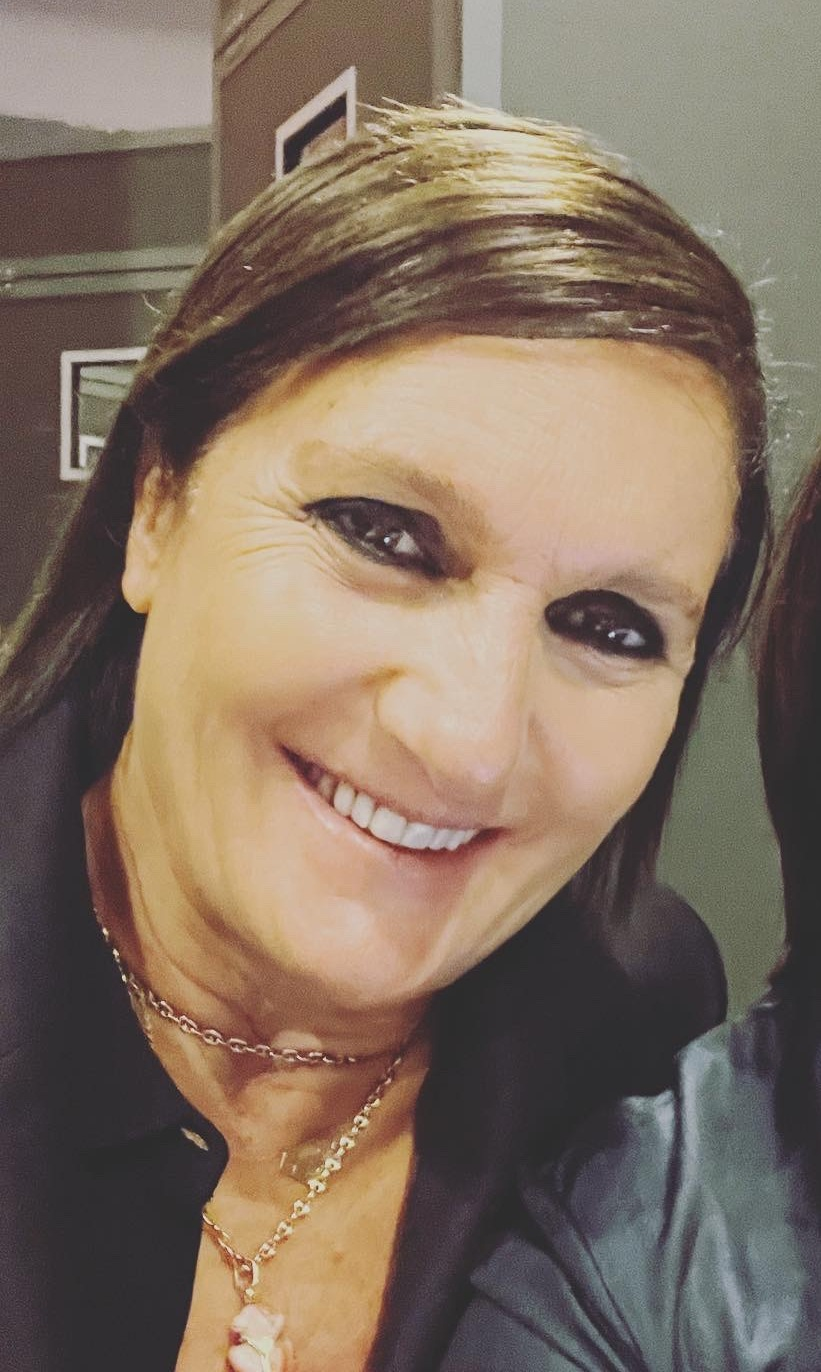
- Chiuri (2023)
- Born: 2 February 1964 (age 62); Rome, Italy
- Education: Istituto Europeo di Design
- Occupation: Chief Creative Officer of Fendi
- Spouse: Paolo Regini
- Children: 2

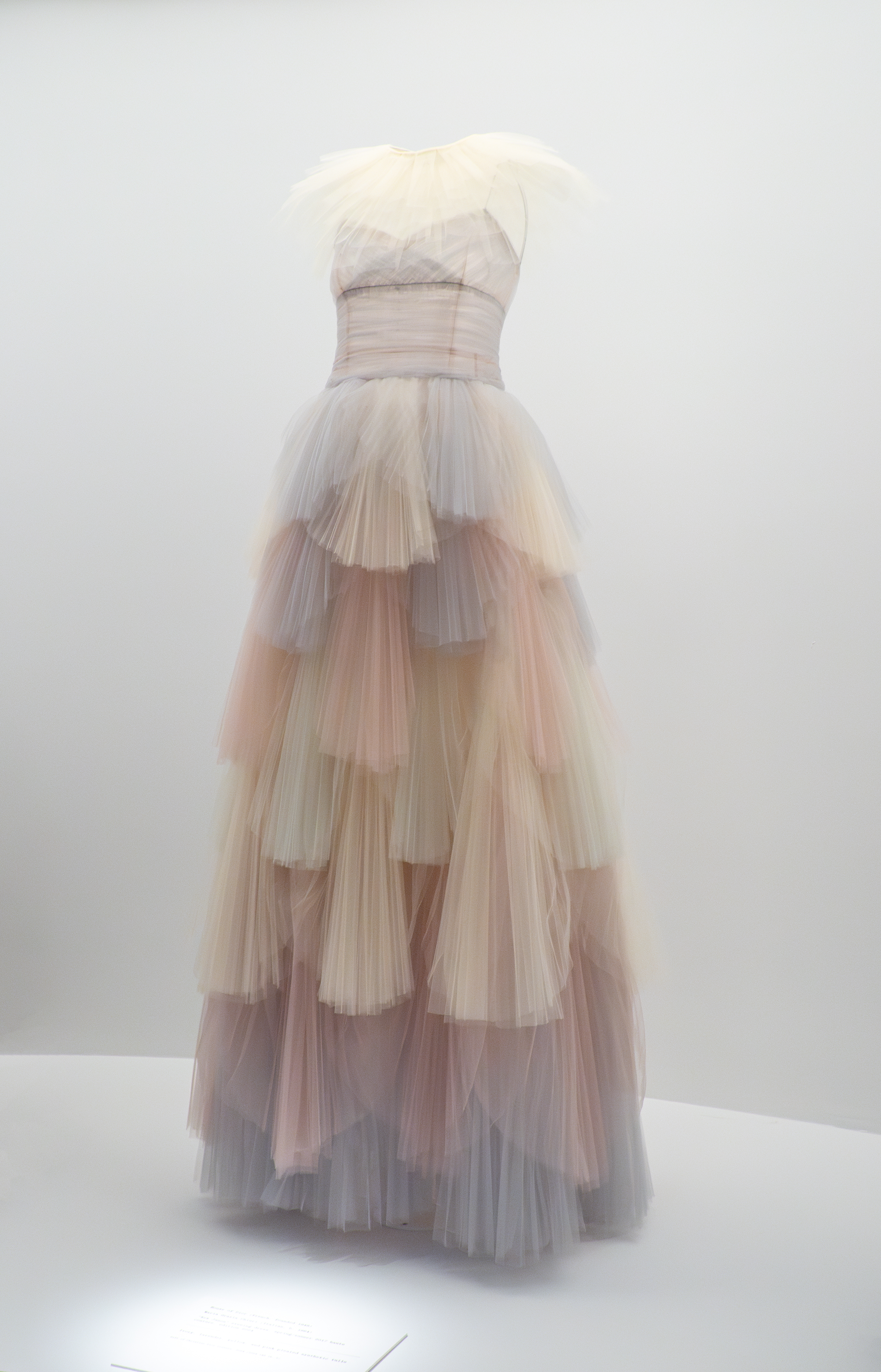
"New Junon" evening dress (spring/summer 2017) by Chiuri, featured in the Sleeping Beauties: Reawakening Fashion exhibition at the Metropolitan Museum of Art

Maria Grazia Chiuri (Italian pronunciation: [maˈriːa ˈgrattsja ˈkjuːri]; born 2 February 1964) is an Italian fashion designer. After stints working at Fendi and Valentino, Chiuri was named creative director at Dior in 2016. She is the chief creative officer of Fendi.

== Early life and education ==
Chiuri's father was in the military and her mother, a dressmaker, joined a sewing workshop at a young age before opening her own boutique in Rome, but pushed her daughter to study. She had five sisters. She has cited her grandmother, mother and sisters as her inspirations. Chiuri studied at Istituto Europeo di Design in Rome, then started at Fendi where she designed handbag lines.

== Career ==
Chiuri joined Fendi in 1989. While at Fendi, she helped develop the famous Baguette bag and recruited the designer Pierpaolo Piccioli to join the department.

In 1999, Chiuri joined Italian fashion house Valentino, where she was responsible for the accessories lines. In 2008, when Valentino Garavani retired, Chiuri was promoted within the Italian company to become artistic co-director of the brand, alongside Pier Paolo Piccioli, whom she had known since her studies at the Istituto Europeo di Design. In 2003, the pair also began to manage creative direction for the Red Valentino diffusion collection. Chiuri and Piccioli were named co-creative directors of Valentino in 2008, overseeing full artistic direction for the brand, including Womenswear, Menswear & Haute Couture. Both designers were awarded the CFDA International Award for their work in 2015.

In 2016, Chiuri was appointed artistic director of the women's collections of Christian Dior (haute couture and ready-to-wear), succeeding Raf Simons, the first woman to lead creation at the French house. She debuted her first collection for Christian Dior SE in Paris in September 2016 with many feminist references, including a t-shirt bearing the title of Chimamanda Ngozi Adichie's essay We Should All Be Feminists. Chiuri would continue this theme in subsequent shows, including a reference to Linda Nochlin's essay Why Have There Been No Great Women Artists? for SS18, as well as a collaboration with artist Judy Chicago and The Chanakya School of Craft for the set of her SS20 Haute Couture collection at Dior. She also reissued the Dior Saddle bag, originally designed by John Galliano in 1999, helping to revive its popularity among a new generation. Chiuri stepped down as creative director for the women's collections of Christian Dior (haute couture and ready-to-wear) in 2025; for her final collection, she chose her hometown Rome as the venue of a runway show, at Villa Albani.

In 2025, Chiuri returned to Fendi as chief creative officer after a decade at Dior.

== Style ==
According to Chiuri, "the new generation has raised big questions about gender, race, environment and cultures that we have to reflect in fashion". Chiuri has often been inspired by feminism for the clothes she has created for Dior. In addition, she regularly invites committed artists to present her collections.

Chiuri's work is often described as youthful, and she cites her daughter Rachele Regini as a muse.

In September 2016, the slogan "We should all be feminists", a phrase by Nigerian author Chimamanda Ngozi Adichie, was printed on white t-shirts of two models at the Dior show at Paris Fashion Week for the Spring 2017 collection. In January 2020, during a Dior fashion show, staged in the garden of the Rodin Museum, the catwalk was lined with 21 banners, on which were embroidered feminist phrases, such as "Could men and women be equal?". In March, quotes such as "The patriarchy kills love" or "We are all clitoridian women" from Carla Lonzi's manifesto were displayed during the presentation of the 1970s-inspired collection.

== Publications ==
In 2021, Chiuri published the book Her Dior: Maria Grazia Chiuri's New Voice. It includes the work of 33 photographers who have worked with Chiuri and Dior.

Chiuri is, along with Pierpaolo Piccioli, author of the book Valentino: Objects of Couture, published in November 2013, about the Valentino fashion house.

== Awards and distinctions ==
- 2024: Neiman Marcus Award for Distinguished Service in the Field of Fashion
- July 2019: Knight of the Legion of Honor
- 2017: Swarovski Award for Positive Change at the Fashion Awards
- 2017: "Glamour Award for Designer of the Year", as well as the "Glamour Award for The Fashion Force", presented by Glamour magazine
- 2015: CFDA (Council of Fashion Designers of America) award for her creations at Valentino

== Personal life ==
Chiuri married Paolo Regini, a shirtmaker, and has two children.

In 2025, Chiuri and her daughter Rachele Regini bought Rome’s Teatro della Cometa, a 233-seat theatre designed in the postwar years for the Italian arts patron Anna Laetitia Pecci-Blunt.
