= Courtauld bag =

Metal handbag believed to have been made in Mosul in the early 1300s

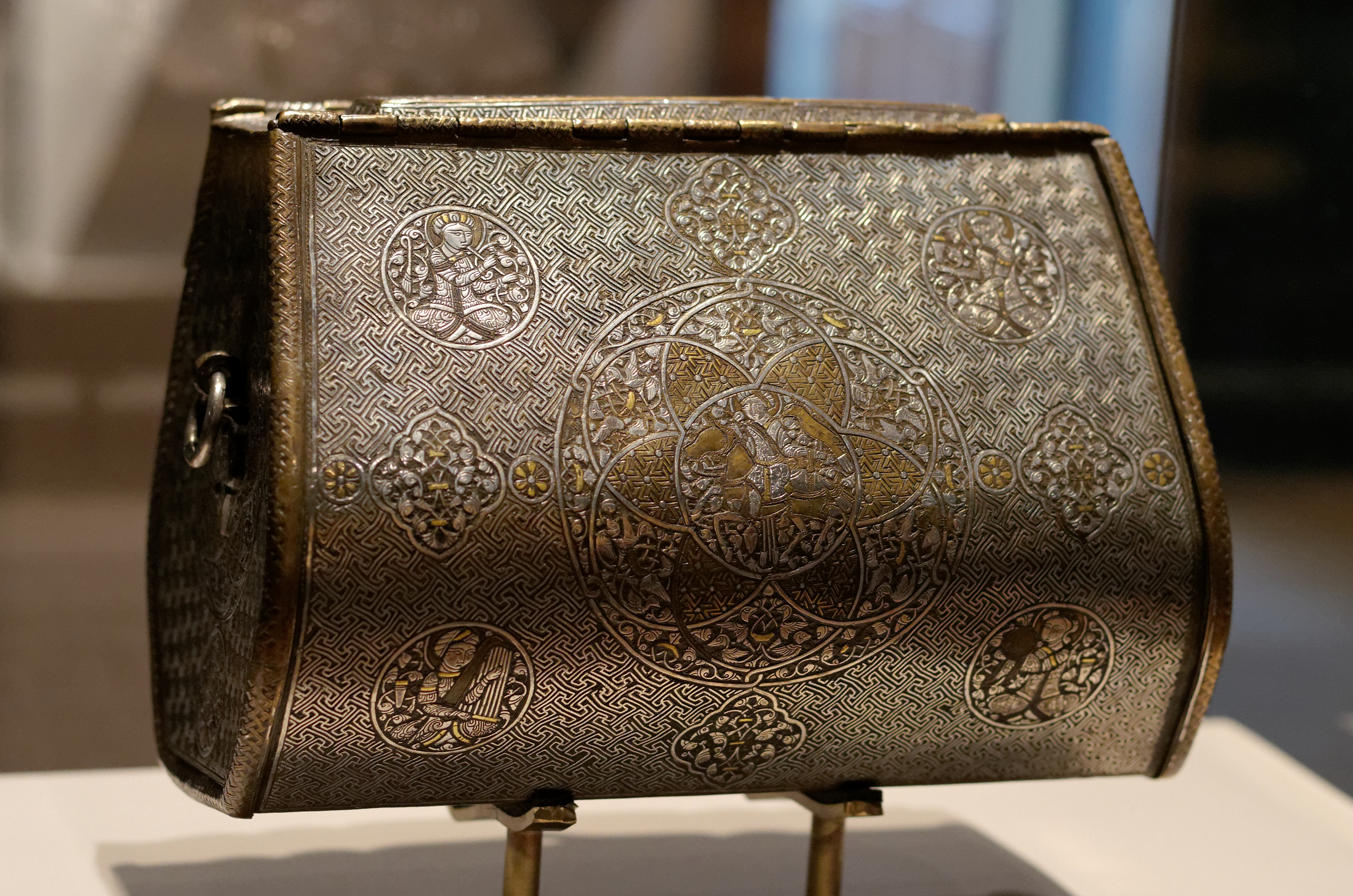
Image of the Courtauld bag

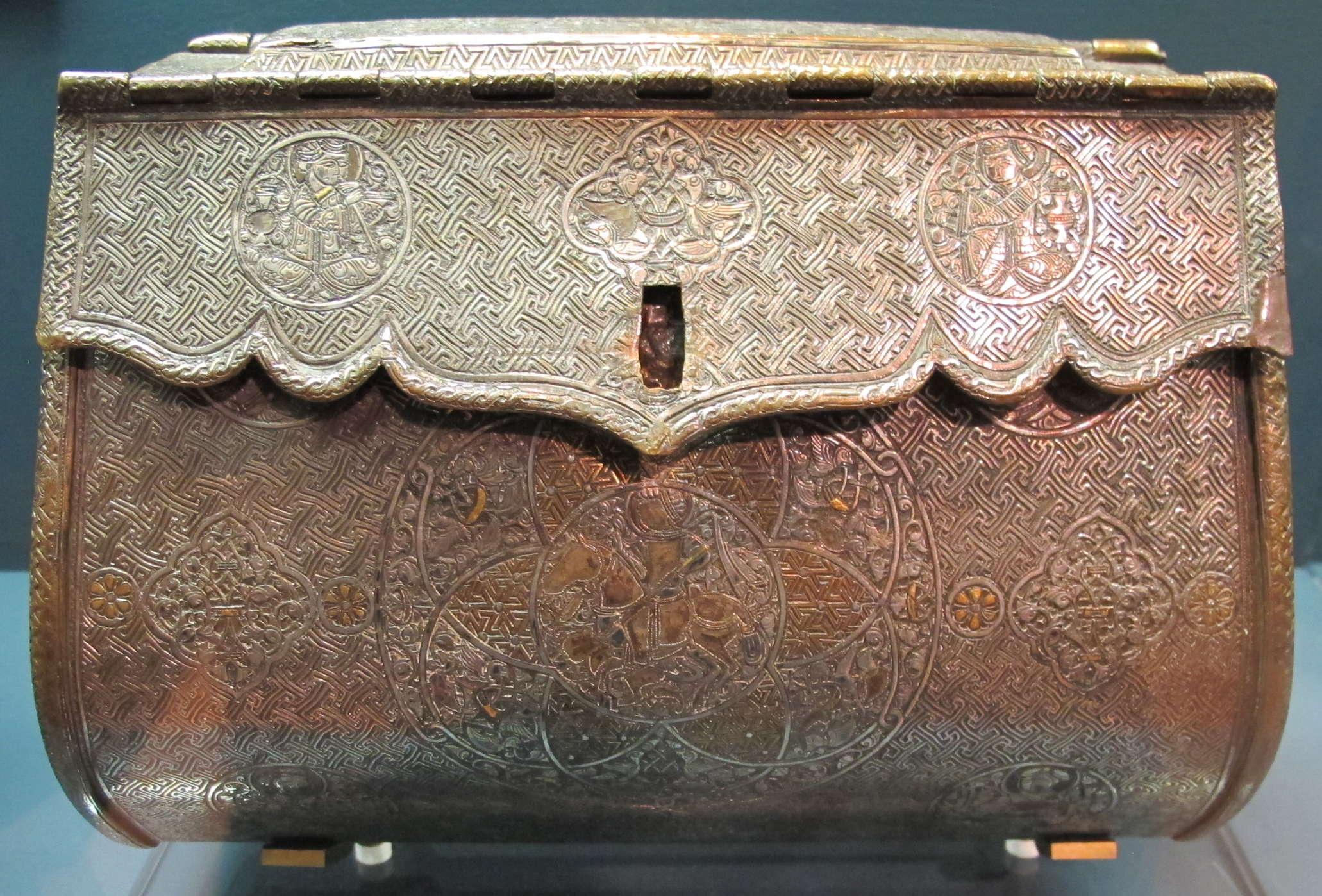
Other side of the bag. The rectangular hole was added later for a padlock.

The "Courtauld bag" is a medieval handbag made of brass and inlaid with gold, silver, and an unidentified black material. Tentatively attributed to Mosul, sometime between 1300 and 1330 when it was ruled by the Ilkhanate, it is believed to be the oldest surviving handbag in the world.

== History ==
At some point after it was originally made, the Courtauld bag seems to have been modified for use as a lockable jewelry box. For example, a ring was added to the top of the lid, and a square of solder was added at the bottom of the inside, which was probably for a metal compartment being soldered inside the bag. There are also traces that a padlock was added on the flap.

The bag was acquired by the British art collector Thomas Gambier Parry in 1858, probably in Venice, and his grandson donated it to the Courtauld Institute of Art in 1966. Before its current identification as a woman's handbag, it was variously thought by male academics to be a man's work basket, document wallet, or saddlebag.

== Construction ==
The bag is made out of five brass sheets soldered or hinged together. It is inlaid with gold, silver, and a black material that is probably bitumen or conifer resin. The current rings on the bag's sides were probably too small for a strap to fit through, so the original rings were probably larger. The strap is now missing. The inside of the bag is now bare, but it was probably originally lined with fabric or colored leather.

The bag's top panel features a court scene with a rhyming Arabic inscription. The court scene features a man and woman seated on a dais, probably representing a Mongol royal couple. To the right of the woman is a servant carrying a mirror and a napkin, with a handbag over his shoulder; this may represent the Courtauld bag itself.

== Identification ==
The Courtauld bag is tentatively attributed to Mosul under Ilkhanate rule, sometime between 1300 and 1330. According to Rachel Ward, it is the oldest known surviving handbag in the world. Ward says it may specifically have been made during the reign of Öljaitü, between 1304 and 1316, based on stylistic similarities to other items made during his reign. She writes that, based on the court scene on the top, the bag likely belonged to an Ilkhanid noblewoman, since contemporary manuscript illustrations depict page boys carrying handbags next to noblewomen but never next to men. She writes that the bag may have been commissioned as a diplomatic gift for an Ilkhanid khatun or princess by the shihna of Mosul during a visit by the royal court to the city. If this was the case, it may have been rarely if ever used, which would explain the relative lack of wear on the bag's reverse. If it was used, the bag would have carried similar items to handbags today: "a few gold coins in case of tips, makeup, and items the holder does not want on display".
