= Delfina Delettrez Fendi =

Italian designer and jeweler (1987)

- Born: 1987 (age 38–39)
- Occupation: Jeweler designer
- Mother: Silvia Venturini Fendi

Delfina Delettrez Fendi (born 1987) is an internationally known Italian designer and jeweler based in Rome.

== Career ==
The fourth-generation heiress of the Fendi family, the Italian luxury fashion house, Delettrez founded her own company, Delfina Delettrez, in 2007, with the help of her father, Bernard Delettrez, a well known jewellery maker who gave her his own brand symbol (and the know-how) which was designed by Karl Lagerfeld for him many years before. In the same year, the trendsetting Paris store Colette staged a show of the pieces Delettrez had made for herself. By January 2009, the Musée des Arts Décoratifs in Paris had acquired two of her pieces for its permanent collection.

Her works have led to numerous design collaborations with brands such as Kenzo, Miami-based concept store The Webster, Dover Street Market, Diamond Foundry, Fendi; made from precious metals and gemstones, Delettrez's designs consist of figurative surrealism and natural iconography including animals, hands and lips, alongside her new signature eye design.

Delettrez has also presented solo exhibitions at the Antonella Villanova Gallery in Miami, as well as the Galleria O in Rome, and in March 2012 she showcased her Metalphysic collection at the Louvre's Musée des Arts Décoratifs in Paris, becoming the youngest designer to be showcased at the venerated museum. In 2013 she was chosen to become part of BoF 500 – The people shaping the global fashion industry. In 2016, she was named in Forbes Magazine "30 Under 30" list that celebrates the youngest and brightest entrepreneurs.
