= Silvia Venturini Fendi =

Italian fashion designer

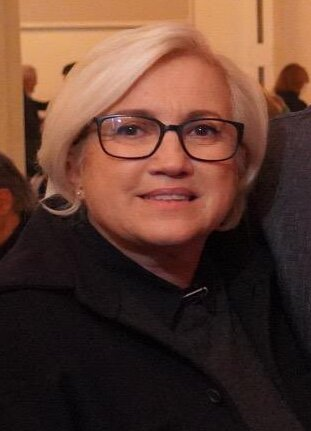
- Fendi in 2026
- Born: 1960 (age 65–66)
- Occupation: Fashion designer
- Organization: Honorary President of Fendi

Silvia Venturini Fendi (born 1960) is an Italian fashion designer best known for her work for her family's fashion company, Fendi, where she served as the long-time Creative Director of Accessories and Menswear. She served as the Creative Director of Womenswear on an interim basis from 2019 to 2020. She served as the Artistic Director of Fendi from 2024 to 2025, when she stepped down to become the Honorary President of Fendi. Her best-known creation is the Baguette.

== Biography ==
Fendi was born in 1960. As a young girl, she apprenticed for her mother, Anna Fendi. She then studied in Italy and London and worked in marketing for Fendi in Los Angeles. She also entered design.

Her first major project for Fendi was launching her own line for young people, Silvia, under the Fendissime line, which she also served as designer of from 1987 to 1992. In 1992, she became the second-in-command to Karl Lagerfeld at Fendi, and also became Creative Director of Menswear and Accessories in 1994. She was also a mentee of Lagerfeld, and they worked side by side, him on womenswear and her on menswear.

Her most famous creation in accessories was the Baguette, a bag she invented in 1997. It became well-known after appearing and being namedropped in an episode of Sex and the City. It was described as "fashion's most notable It bag" by Harper's Bazaar. She subsequently also designed other notable bags, including the Peekaboo, which, like the Baguette, was ranked among the 10 defining moments of Fendi by Marie Claire, as well as Mama Baguette, By The Way, and First.

From 2019 to 2020, after the death of Lagerfeld, she served as interim Creative Director for womenswear on top of her other portfolios. When Kim Jones joined, Fendi returned to accessories and menswear. However, after Jones departed in Fall 2024, Fendi took on the role of sole Creative Director. Associated Press described her as having her "confidence in full bloom". Her Spring/Summer 2026 collection featured flower motifs.

On September 29, 2025, Fendi announced she would be leaving as Creative Director and taking the role of Honorary President.

She, along with her family, also funded the restoration of the Trevi Fountain.
