= Carla Fendi =

Italian fashion executive and philanthropist

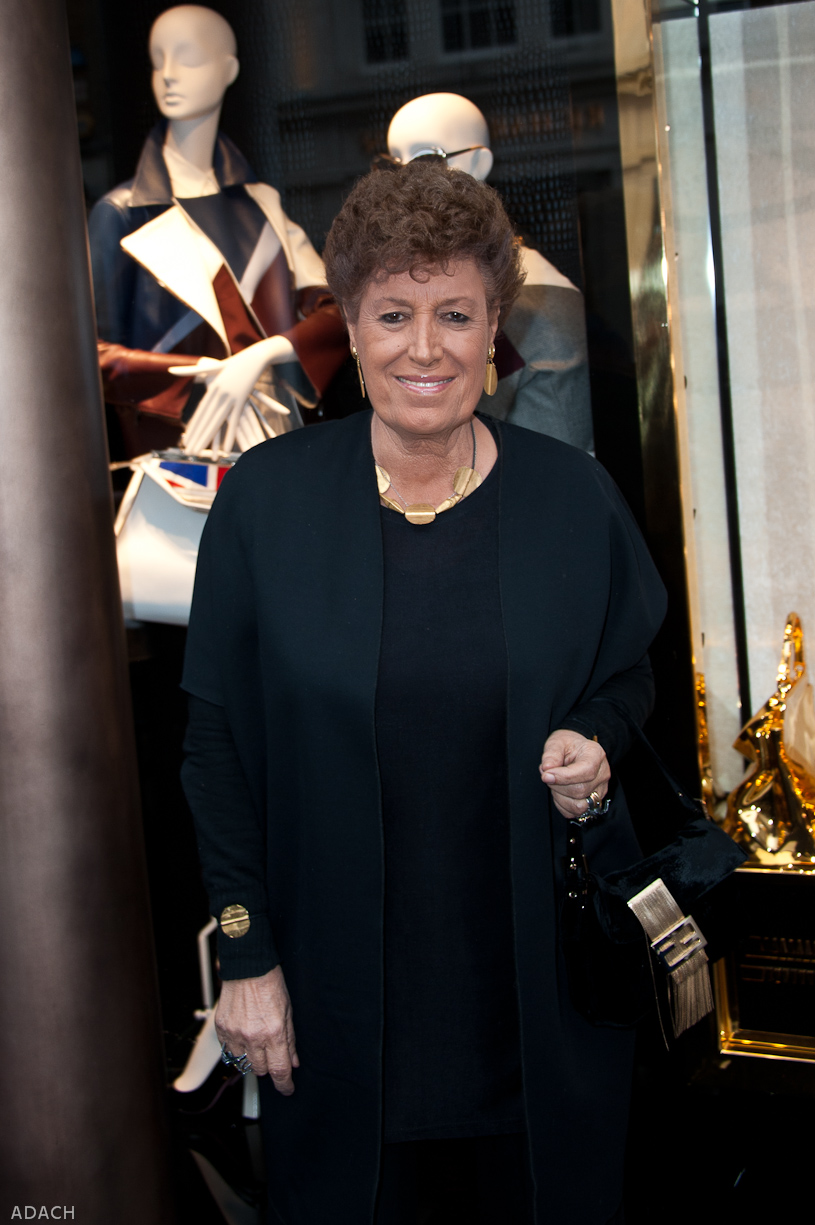
- Fendi store opening - Carla Fendi
- Born: July 12, 1937
- Died: June 19, 2017 (aged 79)
- Occupation: Fashion executive
- Known for: President of Fendi, Philanthropy

Carla Fendi (July 12, 1937 – June 19, 2017) was an Italian fashion executive and philanthropist who worked for Fendi, along with her sisters and parents. She was also well known for her philanthropy.

== Biography ==
Carla Fendi was born on July 12, 1937, to Edoardo and Adele Fendi. She had four sisters, Paola, Anna, Franca and Alda. She was married to Candido Speroni, but did not have any children.

In the 1950s, Carla started working with her sisters for Fendi, the family's shop that Edoardo and Adele had begun in 1925. The sisters built the company from a small shop to a globally recognized brand with multiple product lines. After their father died, they opened their own version of the Fendi store in 1964, and a year later hired a young Karl Lagerfeld to change the brand's image. Starting in 1965, the brand's bags, furs and scarves became a hit in Hollywood. In October 1984, she responded to the scandal over the tagline used by Fendi at a show, "shaped to be raped", an idea initially suggested by Lagerfeld. In 1987, she extended the brand's product lines with the release of Fendi perfumes. In 1989, she inaugurated the NY store, the first of the brand outside of Rome to hold all of Fendi's products.

While Carla's sisters concentrated on design, her own focus was upon promotion and marketing. She became the president and public face of the design house. Though the controlling share of Fendi was sold to LVMH in 2001, Carla Fendi remained president of the company until 2008, and remained honorary president for her lifetime.

Italy's minister of culture, Dario Franchescini, described her as a major patron of the arts. Her philanthropic arm, the Carla Fendi Foundation, was the major patron for the recent restoration of Rome's famed Trevi Fountain. The Foundation did also restore the Teatro Caio Melisso in Spoleto in 2010.

After her husband died in November 2013, her health deteriorated. After a long illness, she died in Rome on June 19, 2017, at the age of 79.
