= Fendi =

Italian enterprise and fashion house

Fendi Srl

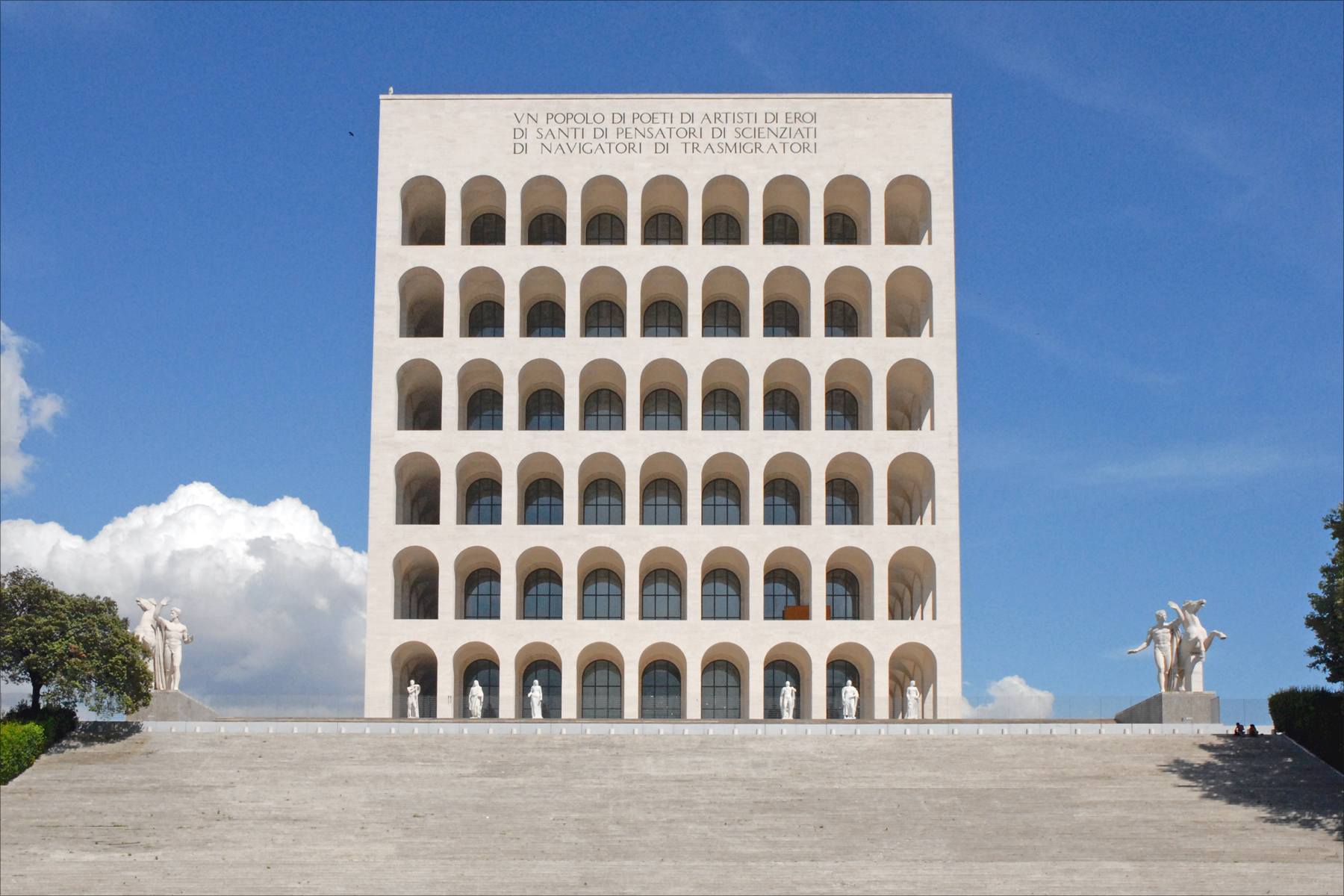
- Palazzo della Civiltà Italiana, Fendi headquarters in Rome
- Type: Subsidiary
- Industry: Fashion
- Founded: 1925; 101 years ago
- Founders: Adele and Edoardo Fendi
- Headquarters: Palazzo della Civiltà Italiana; Quadrato della Concordia 3; 00144 Rome; Italy; 41.83689°N 12.46521°E
- Number of locations: 253 stores worldwide (2025)
- Key people: Bernard Arnault (group CEO); Ramon Ros (CEO); Maria Grazia Chiuri (Chief Creative Officer); Delfina Delettrez Fendi (artistic director, jewellery); Silvia Venturini Fendi (honorary president)
- Parent: LVMH
- Website: www.fendi.com

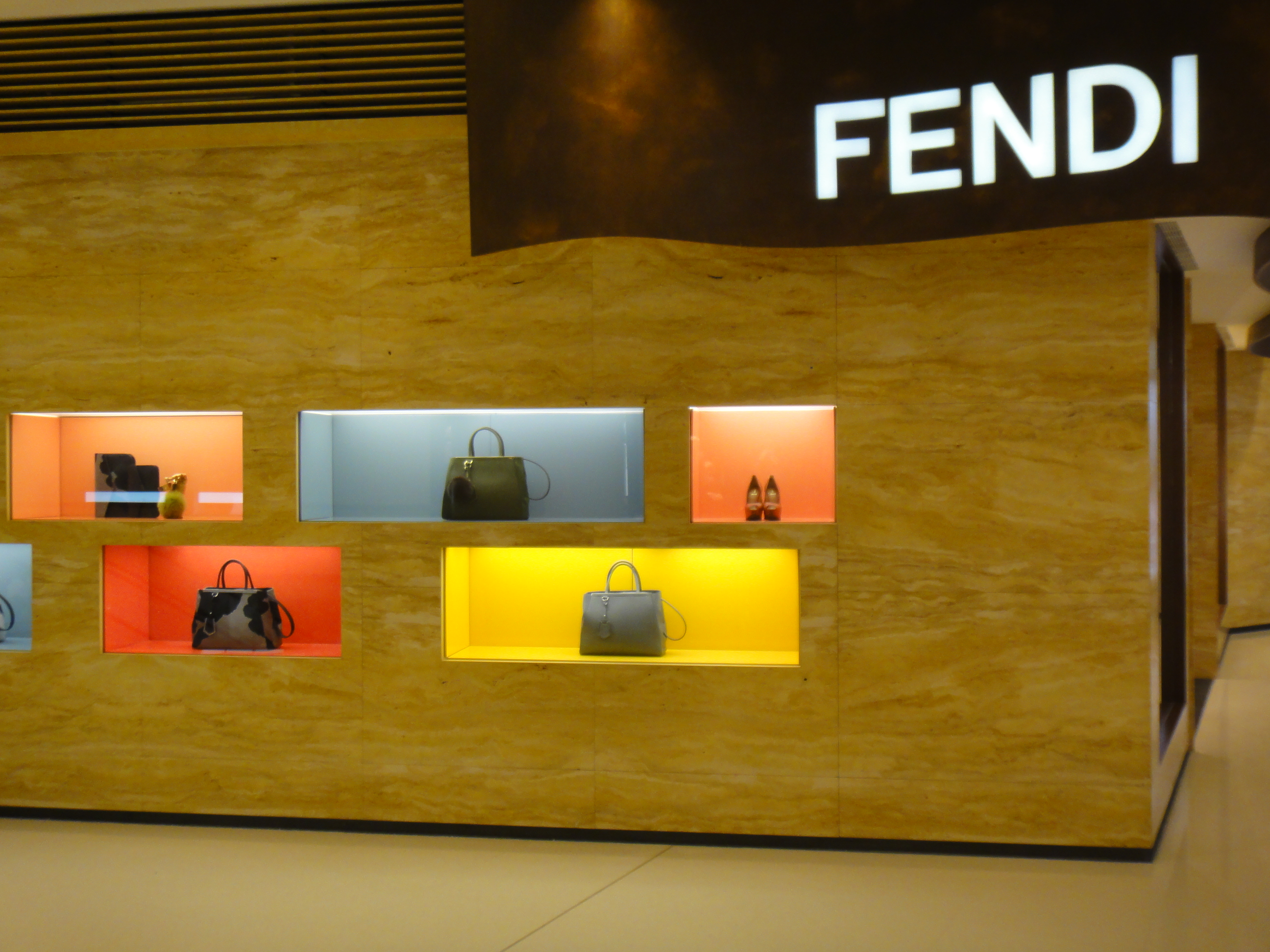
Fendi shop at the Elements, Union Square, Kowloon

Fendi Srl (Italian pronunciation: [ˈfɛndi]) is an Italian luxury fashion house producing fur, ready-to-wear, leather goods, shoes, fragrances, eyewear, timepieces and accessories. Founded in Rome in 1925 by fashion designers Edoardo Fendi and Adele Casagrande, Fendi is known for its fur, fur accessories, and leather goods. In 2001 Fendi became part of the "Fashion & Leather Goods" division of the French group LVMH. Its headquarters are in Rome, in the Palazzo della Civiltà Italiana.

== History ==
=== Early years ===
The founder of the brand, Edoardo Fendi, stated that his origins go back to the Efendizade family, a long-established family from İzmir. Anna Fendi and Delfina Delettrez have used similar expressions. Turkish word “Efendi” means “gentleman” in English. The house of Fendi was launched in 1925 by Adele and Edoardo Fendi (1904–1954) as a fur and leather shop in Via del Plebiscito, Rome. In 1932 Adele and Edoardo Fendi opened a boutique in via Piave; the shop became a popular destination for tourists in Rome.

In 1946, the five sisters Paola, Anna, Franca, Carla, and Alda joined the company in its second generation as a family-owned enterprise, each owning 20 percent. Karl Lagerfeld joined Fendi in 1965 and became the creative director for the fur and women's ready-to-wear collections (launched in 1977).

In 1966, Lagerfeld created the company logo, a double F in a square, which would later be the subject of various reinterpretations. Also in 1966, Fendi presented its first high fashion collection, expanding its interests in the United States and Japan. In 1969, its first commercial line of fur was launched, and in the following years, cosmetics and men's accessories were released. In 1977, Fendi introduced clothing for the first time, its ready-to-wear collection.

=== 1980s–1990s ===
In the 1980s, Fendi expanded its range with perfumes in 1985, as well as eyewear, jeans, and home furnishings in 1987.

In 1989, Fendi opened its first United States boutique in New York on 5th Avenue.

In 1994, Lagerfeld launched the Knicoat collection, a line of wool coats and sweaters designed to be worn together.

Also by 1994, fashion operations were responsible for 90 percent of the firm's total revenue, of which 50 percent came from leather goods and accessories, 20 percent from apparel and 20 percent from furs. That year, Paola Fendi handed over the presidency of the company to her younger sister Carla. Silvia Venturini Fendi, daughter of Anna, also joined the fashion house in 1994 and has since been the artistic director for accessories and co-designer of the women's line alongside Lagerfeld; in 1997 she designed the Baguette Bag, an iconic model that beat all sales and notoriety records.

=== Sale of controlling share ===
Fendi was a family-controlled company until 1999, when Prada and LVMH, the world's biggest luxury goods group, joined to buy 51 percent of Fendi for US$545 million, outbidding competitor Gucci. Under the deal, Prada and LVMH were obligated to acquire any of the remaining 49 percent of Fendi, should the sisters decide to sell. The label lost approximately 20 million euros in 2001 and again in 2002. In 2002, Prada agreed to sell its 25.5 percent stake to LVMH for $265 million. In 2002, LVMH acquired an additional 15.9 percent of the company. Carla Fendi, a member of the founding family, continued to act as chairwoman and a minority owner until 2008.

On 19 October 2007, Fendi chose the Great Wall of China to present its spring-summer collection and with 88 models, the first fashion show there.

In 2009, Silvia Venturini Fendi created the Peekaboo bag, achieving a success comparable to the Baguette Bag.

=== 2010s ===
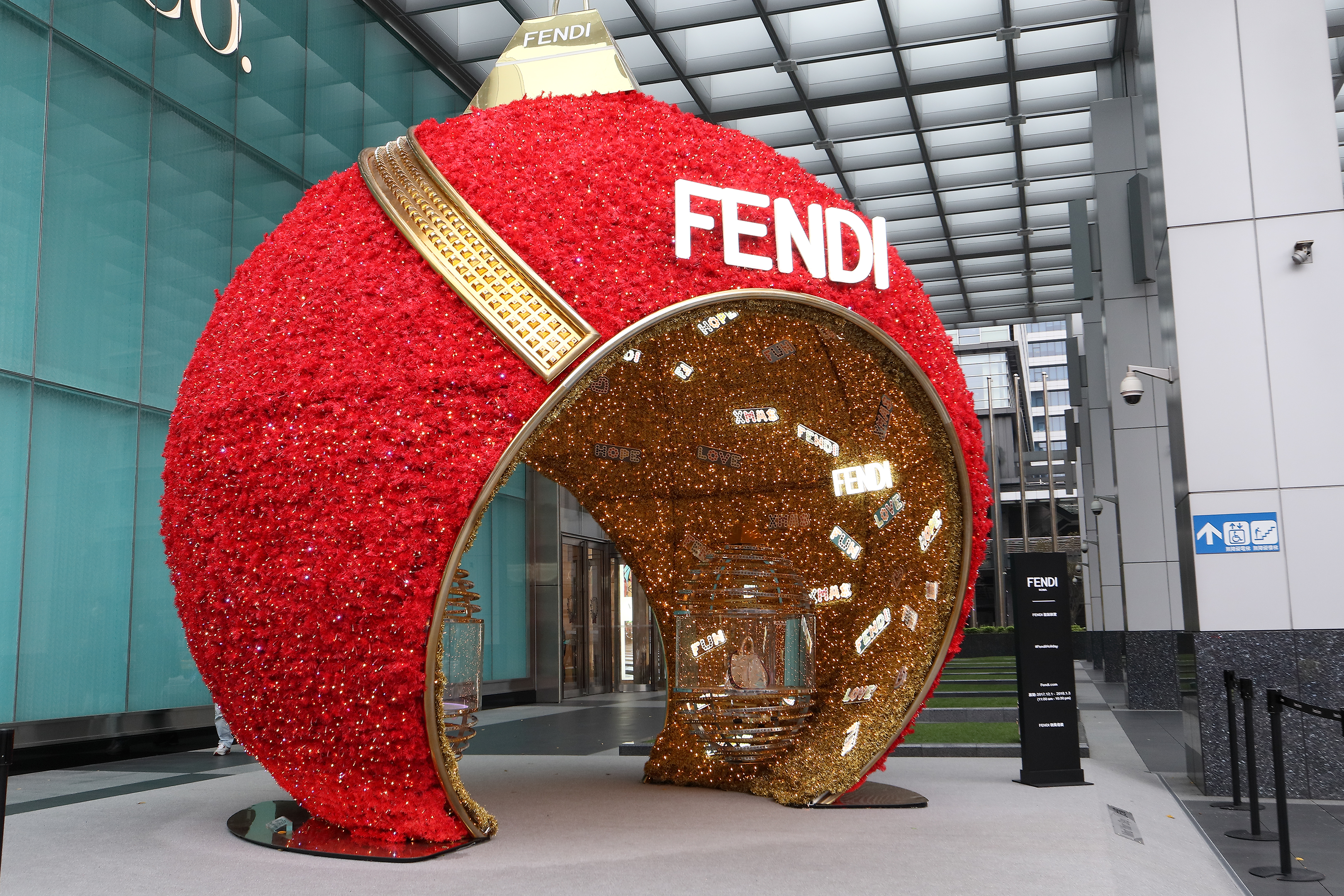
Fendi Christmas installation in Taipei, Taiwan, 2017

In 2015, Fendi celebrated fifty years of business with Karl Lagerfeld and organized its first haute couture fashion show dedicated to furs, Haute Fourrure, at the Théâtre des Champs-Élysées in Paris. Later the brand celebrated its 90th anniversary with a fashion show at the Trevi fountain in Rome and planned to move its headquarters to Palazzo della Civiltà Italiana, paying 2.8 million euros per annum to occupy the space; Fendi instead opened a hotel and its largest store at the location in 2016.

In 2017, Fendi collaborated with Rimowa on an aluminum multiwheel suitcase. Also in 2017, Fendi released a customization shop in collaboration with e-commerce platform Farfetch for made-to-order handbag designs.

By 2018, Fendi crossed the 1 billion euro ($1.2 billion) threshold in annual sales and had 3,000 employees worldwide, including around 400 in specialist leather and fur ateliers in Italy, and operated a network of 215 stores.

=== 2020s ===
In September 2020, English designer Kim Jones was announced as artistic director of Fendi's women's collection, formerly occupied by Lagerfeld. Under his leadership, Fendi collaborated on a clothing collections with Kim Kardashian's shapewear brand Skims (2021), Versace (2022) and Stefano Pilati (2023).

In May 2024, Fendi announced its return to the perfume market with a first collection of seven scents directly inspired by its origins.

In October 2024, LVMH announced the departure of Kim Jones from Fendi. There was no announcement of a successor. Subsequently, Silvia Venturini Fendi headed the house. She stepped down in 2025.

== Other activities ==
=== Diffusion lines ===
In 1983, Fendi launched the Fendissime diffusion line of furs, ready-to-wear clothing and handbags, then designed by Silvia, Maria Teresa and Federica Fendi. From 1987 to 1992, Silvia Venturini Fendi served as the label's designer. The Fendissime line closed in 2001.

Other diffusion lines have included Fendi 365, Fendi Country (later Fendi Jeans), and Fendi Maglia knitwear. Through licensing agreements, Gruppo Nadini manufactured and distributed several of these lines.

=== Fendi Kids ===
The Fendi Kids label made its debut in Spring/Summer 2011.

=== Fragrances ===
All previous Fendi fragrances were removed from the market after the end of the brand's beauty license with Gucci Group's YSL Beauté division in 2005.

In 2007, Fendi introduced its Fendi Palazzo women's fragrance but stopped selling it in 2009 already. In 2010, the brand launched a new fragrance—Fan di Fendi, the first Fendi scent to be unleashed under LVMH Fragrance Brands—before discontinuing its fragrances in 2015. In 2024, Fendi unveiled a high-end fragrance collection consisting of seven scents.

=== Eyewear ===
From 2013 until 2021, the company had a brand licensing agreement with Safilo for the design, production and worldwide distribution of Fendi sunglasses and optical frames.

In 2021, Fendi ended its partnership with Safilo and entered into an agreement with LVMH-owned Thelios to create, produce, and distribute its eyewear collection.

=== Fendi Casa ===
Fendi started its first line of home furnishings in 1987. Fendi Casa terminated its collaboration with licensee Luxury Living and instead partnered with Design Holding, jointly controlled by Investindustrial and The Carlyle Group, on creating Fashion Furniture Design (FF Design) to produce and distribute Fendi Casa.

=== Real estate ===
In 2016, Fendi collaborated with the interior designer Fanny Haim on the Fendi Château Residences, a 12-story beachfront condo in Surfside designed by the architecture firm Arquitectonica.

== Artistic directors ==
In 1925, Adele Fendi and Edoardo Fendi established the house of Fendi in Rome. The company sold furs, leathergoods, and accessories. Their children Paola, Anna, Franca, Carla and Alda later took over the house.

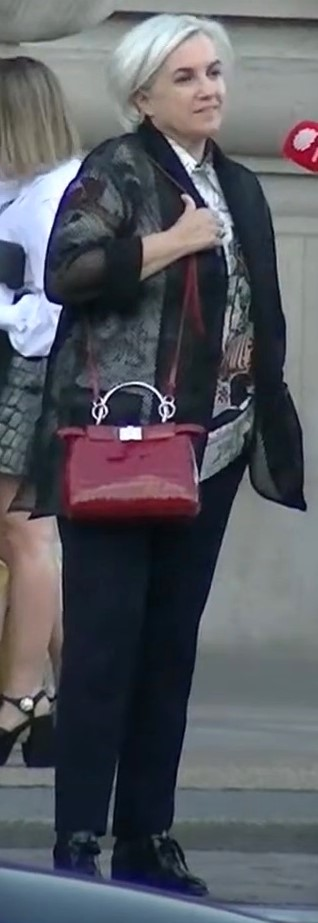
Silvia Venturini Fendi in 2019

Karl Lagerfeld joined Fendi in 1965 as the lead designer in efforts to modernise the company. He also oversaw the 1977 expansion into ready-to-wear. After Lagerfeld's death in 2019, Silvia Venturini Fendi took over the artistic direction of the women's collections. Fendi had overseen the accessories and menswear divisions since 1994.

From September 2020, the women's collections were entrusted to Kim Jones, former stylist for the Dior men's collection, who was appointed artistic director of couture and womenswear. Jones' debut collection was for Fall / Winter 2021/2022. During his tenure at Fendi, he frequently referenced Lagerfeld's ready-to-wear. He left the company in 2024. Following Jones departure Silvia Venturini Fendi oversaw the women's collections alongside keeping her previous role as artistic director of accessories and menswear.

In 2021, Delfina Delettrez Fendi, Silvia's daughter, was appointed artistic director of jewelry.

Silvia Venturini Fendi stepped down from her role as artistic director in September 2025.

In October 2025, Italian designer Maria Grazia Chiuri was appointed Chief Creative Officer.

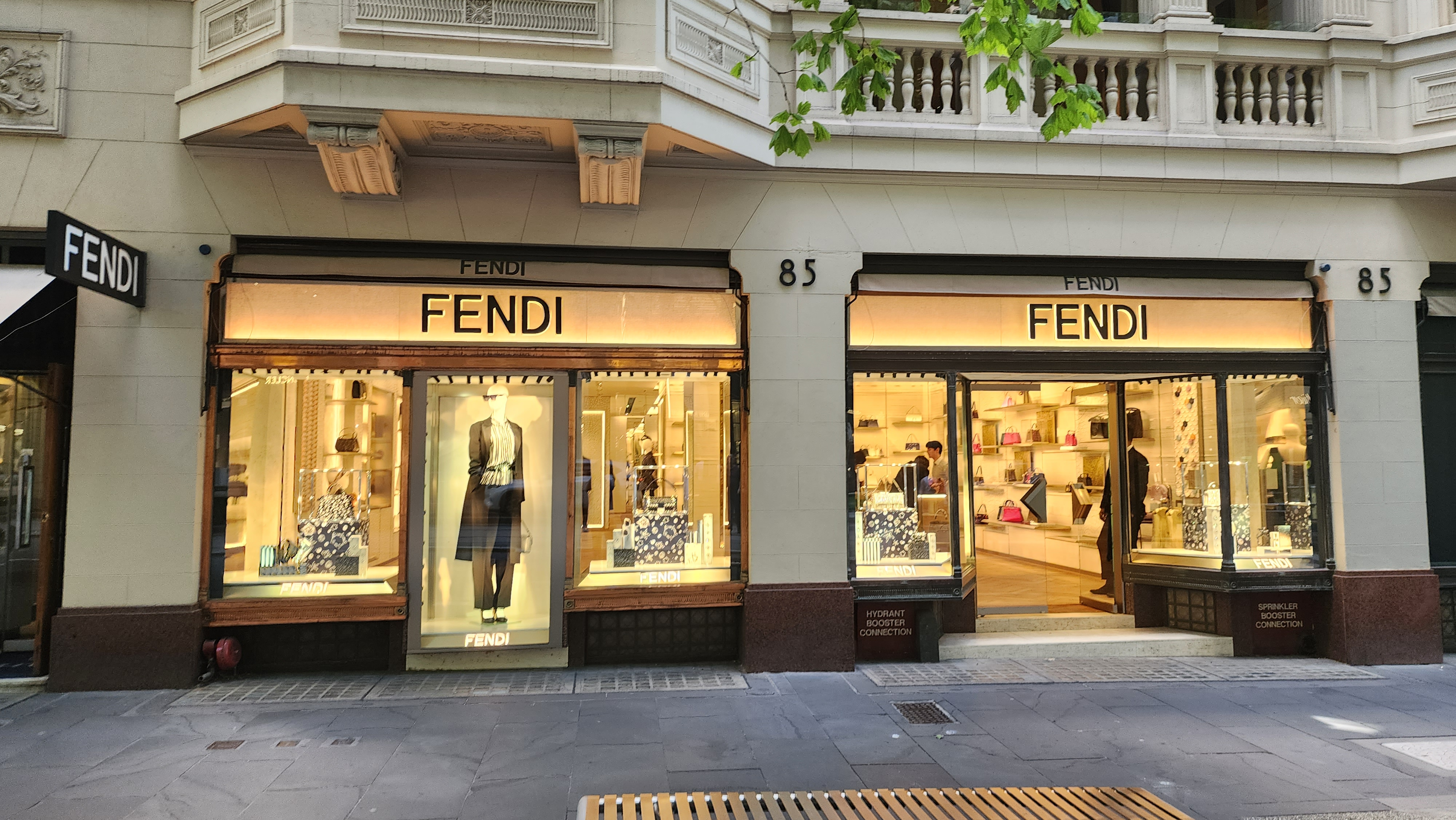
Fendi store in Melbourne

== Cinema ==
Fendi has often collaborated with cinema; the maison has designed the clothes for Once Upon a Time in America, Evita and The Royal Tenenbaums. Many famous film directors in the 1970s, including Luchino Visconti, Federico Fellini, Franco Zeffirelli, and Mauro Bolognini, chose Fendi furs for their characters.

Fendi has also dressed Sophia Loren, Diana Ross, Jacqueline Kennedy Onassis, Soraya, and Liza Minnelli.

== Campaigns ==
Lagerfeld himself was responsible for the photography of most of Fendi's ad campaigns before his death; since then, Fendi has worked with Philip-Lorca diCorcia (2001), Nick Knight, Craig McDean and Steven Meisel.

Past campaigns have featured Mark Ronson (2012), Catherine Zeta-Jones (2019), Zoey Deutch (2020), Linda Evangelista (2022), Naomi Campbell (2023) and Nicholas Galitzine (2023), among others.

=== Visual arts ===
In 2017, Fendi installed Foglie di Pietra [Leaves of Stone], a sculpture by Giuseppe Penone, in Rome's Largo Goldoni and donated to the city; Fendi committed to maintaining and preserving the monument for 30 years. Also in 2017, Fendi sponsored the Italian pavilion at the 57th Venice Biennale.

In 2018, Fendi signed a partnership with the Galleria Borghese to support the museum's exhibitions for the following three years.

=== Other activities ===
In 2021, Fendi collaborated with a non-profit organization to create a 'charity project' which consisted of designing a kids' unisex T-shirt whose money would be devoted to realize the wishes of kids who suffer from serious sicknesses.

In 2021 and 2022, Fendi collaborated with the Juilliard School on assigning the Fendi Vanguard Award – including a cash prize and a mentorship program – to four out of Juilliard's final-year students enrolled in the bachelor's, master's and advanced diploma programs.

== Controversy ==
Fendi sued Burlington in 1986 for selling counterfeit handbags, and filed a new lawsuit in 2006 after concluding the company was violating the injunction. In 2010, a U.S. Magistrate recommended that Burlington pay Fendi just over $5.6 million in damages, attorney's fees and costs to settle a dispute dating to 1986 over the alleged sale of counterfeit Fendi-branded leather goods. Burlington subsequently agreed to pay $10.05 million.

Also in 2010, Fendi reached a $2.5 million settlement with the former parent company of Filene's Basement to resolve counterfeiting claims.
