= Andreï Svetchine =

French architect (1912–1996)

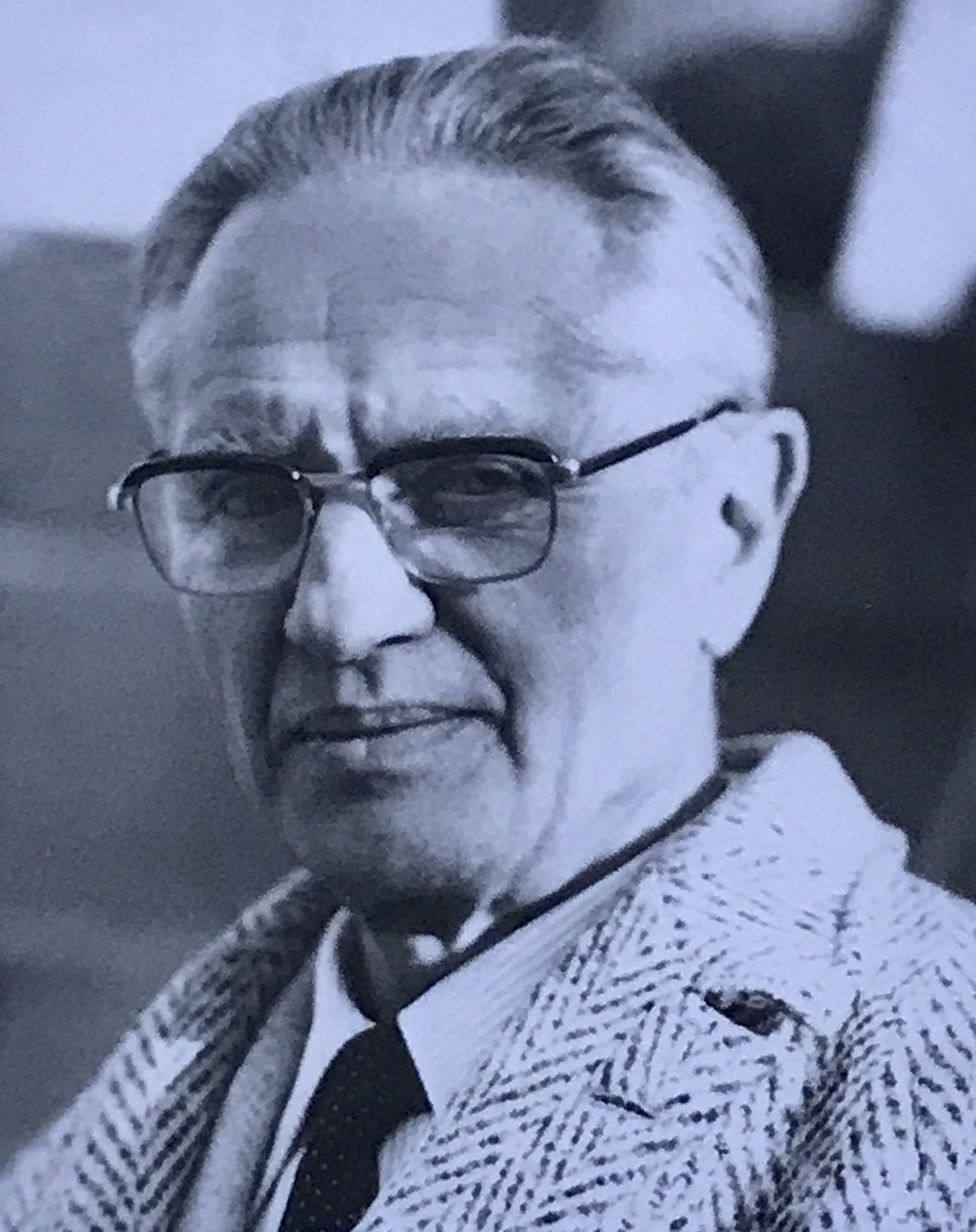

Andreï Svetchine, also known as André Svétchine, (1912–1996) was a Russian-born French architect.

Svetchine was born in Saint Petersburg and died in Nice.

== Works ==
- Villa of Marc Chagall in Saint-Jean-Cap-Ferrat (1949)
- Mill in Mougins for Raymonde Zehnaker (1951–1952)
- Château de La Colle Noire in Montauroux for Christian Dior (1955–1957)
- Fernand Léger Museum in Biot (1957–1960)
- Villa of Marc Chagall in Saint-Paul-de-Vence (1964–1966)
- Villa of brewer Heineken in Cap d'Antibes (1965–1966)

== Restorations ==
- Colombe d'Or in Saint-Paul-de-Vence (1949–1950)
- Orthodox Cathedral in Nice
