= Château de La Colle Noire =

Château in Provence-Alpes-Côte d'Azur, France

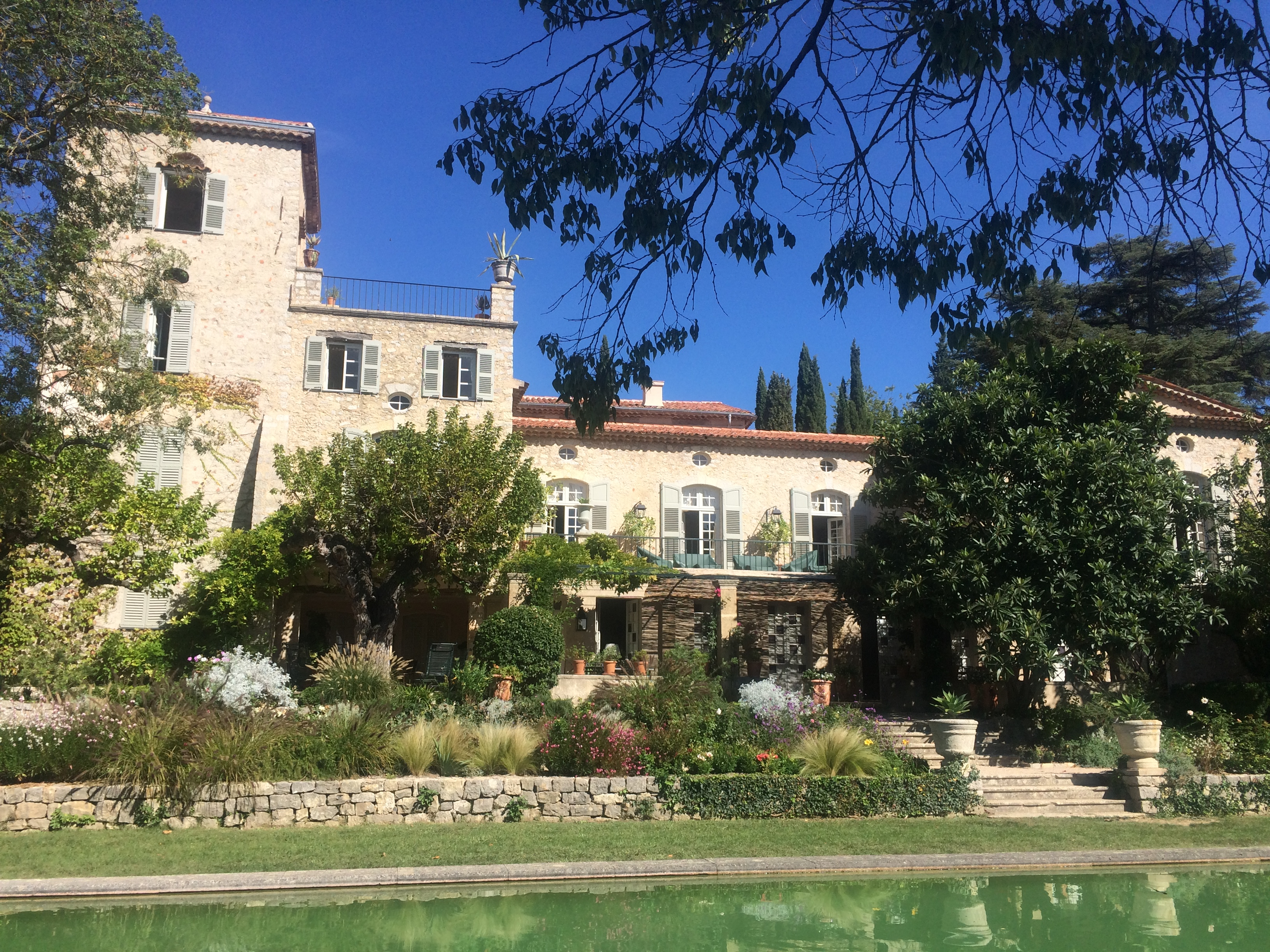
- View of the South Façade in 2016

- Location within France

General information
- Location: Montauroux, Var, Provence-Alpes-Côte d'Azur, France
- Coordinates: 43°35′51″N 6°47′17″E
- Construction started: mid-19th century
- Completed: 20th century
- Owner: Parfums Christian Dior

Design and construction
- Architect: Andreï Svetchine

Website
- www.dior.com/home/en_gb

The Château de La Colle Noire is a property located at the entrance of the Pays of Fayence, on the border of the Alpes-Maritimes and the Var region. It is built on a promontory overlooking the plains of Montauroux. The chateau is surrounded by a park with a chapel dedicated to St Anne. The ensemble dates from the middle of the 19th century and was entirely redesigned by Christian Dior from 1950. It has been the property of Parfums Christian Dior since 2013.

== History ==
From the 15th century to the beginning of the 19th century, the site was described in various ways: La Colle Narbonne, La Colle, La Colle Noire, La Colle dwelling etc. It was from 1826 that the domain finally took shape when Henri-Emmanuel Poulle (1792–1877), lawyer, first president of the Court of Aix-en-Provence and deputy of the Var region, from an old family of Montauroux, became owner. He took the neighbouring hamlet's name, becoming the "domain de La Colle Noire".

In 1839, Henri-Emmanuel Poulle created a staging post on the estate which later would serve as the base for the future chateau. Over time, through various acquisitions, the estate grew to more than 90 hectares, becoming a vast agricultural operation composed of plowing fields, pastures, vines and mulberries. In 1858, at the age of 66, Henri-Emmanuel Poulle decided to build a residence for his retirement. The construction lasted three years, from 1858 to 1861. The facade with its two emblematic towers that dominate the valley, dates from that time. It was also during this period that Poulle had a chapel dedicated to St Anne, in reference to his daughter Anne-Victoire. Henri-Emmanuel Poulle also had a chapel dedicated to Saint Barthélémy in the village of Montauroux near the parish church. Due to the loss of its land title, it could not be sold as a national asset under the French Revolution and was thus protected from vandalism during the 1870 revolution. It passed into the heritage of H-E. Poulle and was transmitted to Christian Dior who offered it to the commune of Montauroux in 1953. The chapel was built in 1634 by the White Penitents, and still has today the wooden painted decor which adorns the walls as well as the vault.

Upon the death of Henri-Emmanuel Poulle in 1877, the property passed on to his daughter, Anne-Victoire (1827–1894), who was married to Félix Reibaud, postmaster of the sector. Anne-Victoire was very pious and obtained permission from the Bishop of Frejus-Toulon to allow the priest of Montauroux to say mass in the chapel St Anne every Sunday except for Christmas, Easter and other festivals. The inhabitants of the neighborhood became accustomed to hearing Mass at La Colle Noire. The St Anne chapel is still consecrated today. On the death of Anne-Victoire in 1894, her son Paul Félix Honoré Reibaud inherited the estate of La Colle Noire. Head of office at the Ministry of Justice in Paris, he showed little interest in the property and it was ceded to an industrialist named Fayolle, whose widow resold the estate in 1921 to Pierre Grosselin. On October 25, 1950, the property, still with an area of more than 90 hectares, comprising a noble house, agricultural buildings and land cultivated mainly in vines and flowers, was bought by Christian Dior.

== Christian Dior and La Colle Noire ==
Famous – his house of couture was created in 1946 and his house of perfumes in 1947 – Christian Dior acquired this emblematic property in a region that he knew well. His father, a widow since 1931, lived nearby in the plain of Callian with his young sister Catherine who was the inspiration for the perfume Miss Dior, "And then Miss Dior was born. She was born from those evenings of Provence crossed by fireflies where the green jasmine serves as a counter-song to the melody of the night and the earth".

It was therefore in the Provence dear to his heart, in the inaccessible Var inland that Christian Dior would develop his house, far from Paris and 30 Avenue Montaigne, home of his couture house. "It is in Montauroux, near Callian, where a lucky star allowed me, fifteen years ago, to find tranquility and prepare a new existence. Of the house, I can not say much because I'm restoring it. It is simple, solid and noble, and its serenity suits the period of life that I will have to tackle in a few years. That house, I wish it to be my real home. That where – if God lends me long life – I can withdraw. That where – if I have the means – I can close the loop of my existence and find, under another climate, the closed garden that protected my childhood. That is where I can finally live quietly, forgetting Christian Dior to just become Christian again. It is at Montauroux that I write these last lines".

Christian Dior entrusted the restoration and renovation of La Colle Noire from 1955 to the Russian architect Andreï Svetchine. His friends Raymonde Zehnacker in Mougins and Marc Chagall in Saint-Jean-Cap-Ferrat and Saint-Paul-de-Vence had also solicited this architect, specialized in the transformation of "rural dwellings, neither simple farms nor real castles". He considered that the architectural balance was enough to decorate a house and thus the stonework was laid bare, the perspectives restored and enlarged, the accesses redesigned including the transformation of the service wing into a main entrance with an end resemblance of an 18th-century Bastide.

Planted with cypress trees, a walkway leads to the hexagonal entrance hall, an atrium designed by Christian Dior himself, where the Provençal calade floor has a pattern of compass rose dear to his childhood in Normandy. The south facade is asymmetrical and is in the 1940-50's Provençal style. The chateau is reflected in the 45 meters long ornamental water mirror, also designed by Christian Dior, showing a contrast between the sinuosity of the landscape and the rigor of its straight lines.

Completely redesigned, the new layout includes a large staircase with zenithal lighting leading to guest rooms for “passing friends”, a succession of reception rooms, including the large salon measuring more than 18 metres long opening onto a terrace overlooking the mirror of water. It combines vintage furniture, comfort from the 1950s, references to Provence or England, "Christian Dior wanted to invent an art of living at the Colle Noire", Andreï Svetchine declared. The reception rooms and Christian Dior's apartment are furnished with eclecticism, decorated with objects from the 18th and 19th centuries bought from antique dealers, some rooms have a Louis XV, Louis XVI or Retour d'Égypte style.

The Provence inspired Christian Dior to create Miss Dior in 1947 and it was the Lily of the Valley of La Colle Noire that was at the origin of Diorissimo, created in 1956 by Edmond Roudnitska. It is this tradition and art that has inspired François Demachy the perfumer-creator of Parfums Christian Dior to create La Colle Noire, whom the May Rose flower is provided by the field planted as a tribute in the estate's park.

After the death of Christian Dior on October 23, 1957, his sister Catherine inherited the estate although she was unable to maintain the chateau and it was resold to the Laroches, owners of La Reserve in Beaulieu and then to Mr. and Mrs. Tassou. The British group Oasis recorded in part its fourth album 'Standing on the shoulder of giants' from April to August 1999.

In 2013 Parfums Christian Dior bought La Colle Noire.

After an intense restoration begun in 2015, La Colle Noire was inaugurated by the Parfums Christian Dior on May 9, 2016 in the presence of Charlize Theron, regaining its vocation to welcome "the friends of the house". The Chateau de La Colle Noire illustrates this return to source, with the cultivation of flowers and the creation of perfumes in the “great Grasse countryside” that has been the inspiration for the Christian Dior fragrances.

== See also ==
- Christian Dior
- Parfums Christian Dior

== Bibliography ==
- Guillaume Garcia-Moreau, Le château de La Colle Noire, un art de vivre en Provence, Dior, 2018. Read online
