= Christian Dior =

French fashion designer (1905–1957)

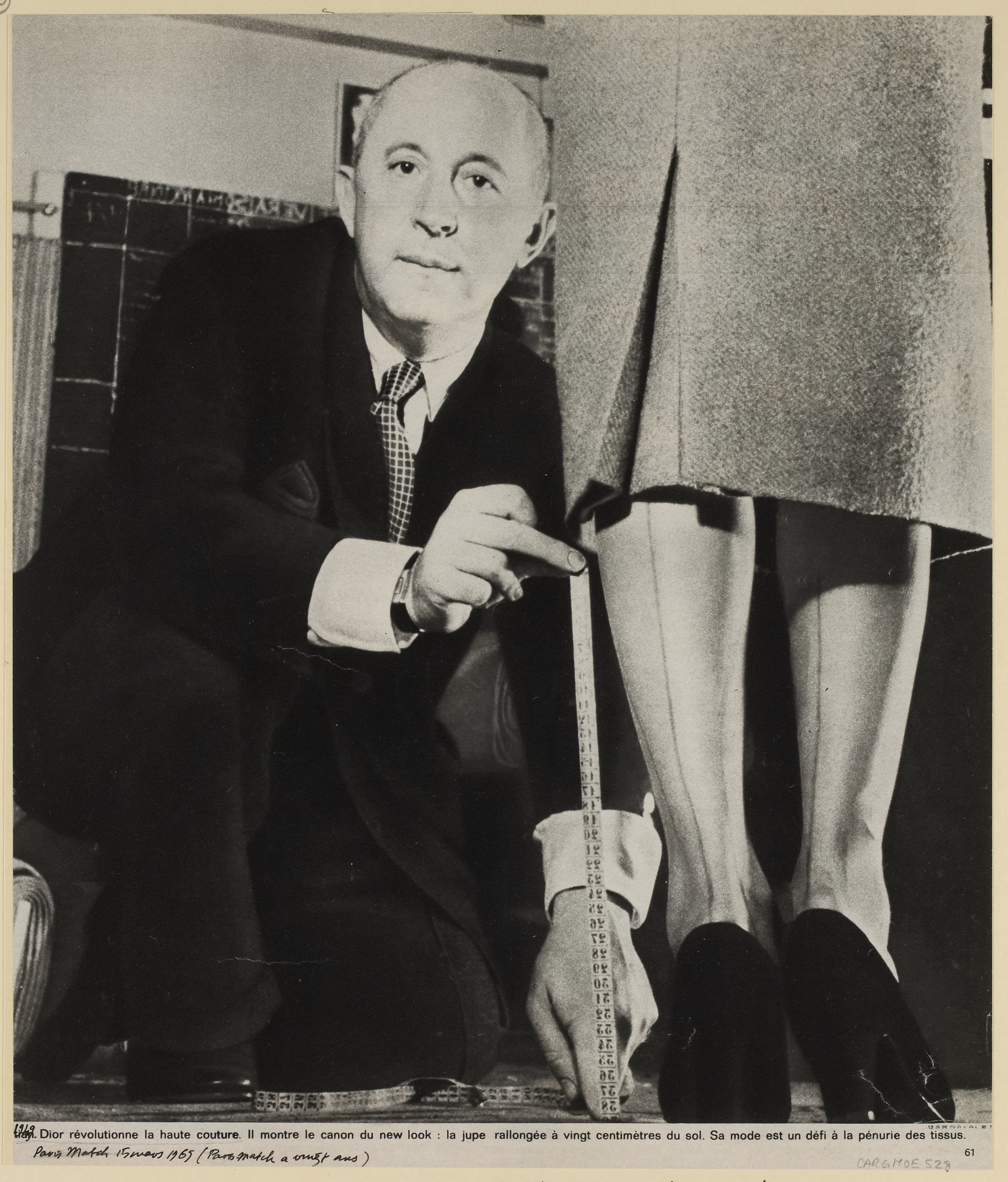
- Born: Christian Ernest Dior; 21 January 1905; Granville, France
- Died: 24 October 1957 (aged 52); Montecatini Terme, Italy
- Known for: Fashion design, haute couture
- Parents: Maurice Dior (father); Madeleine Martin (mother)
- Relatives: Catherine Dior (sister); Françoise Dior (niece)
- Awards: Légion d'honneur (1950)

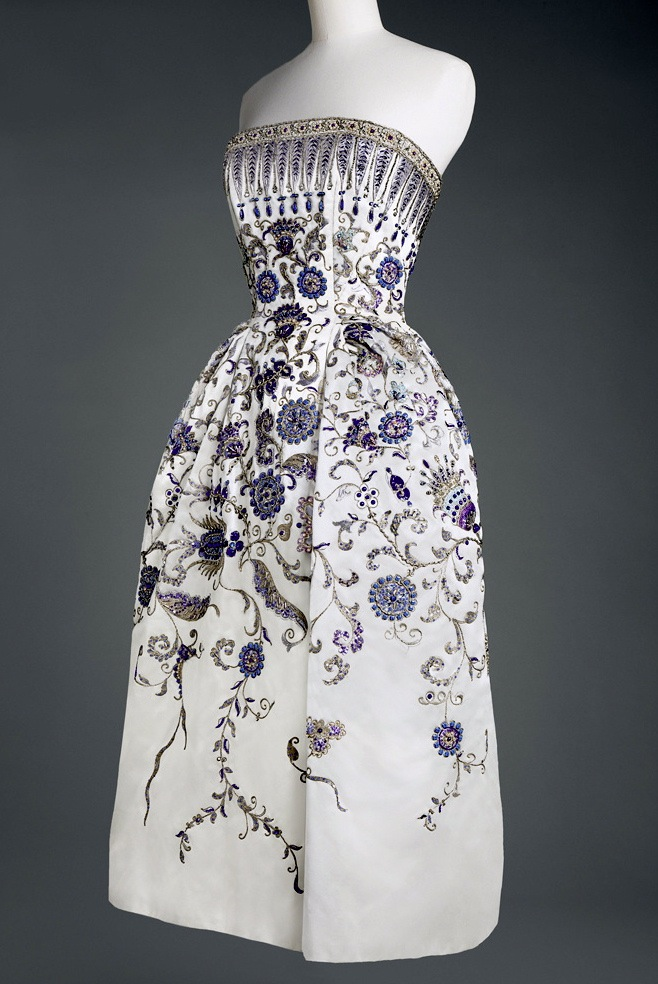
The Dior "Palmyre" Gown, for Wallis Simpson

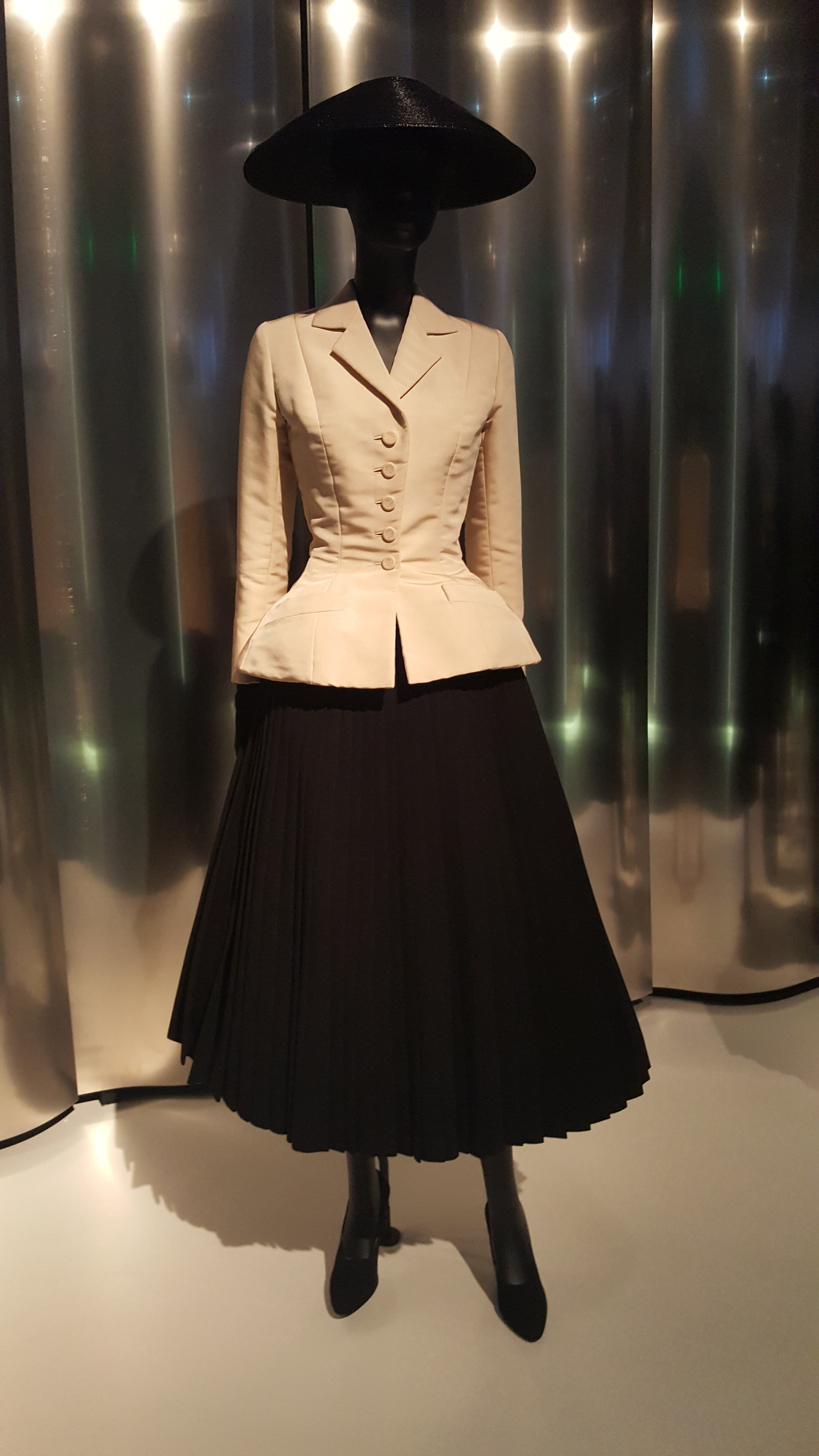
The Dior "Bar Suit", 1947

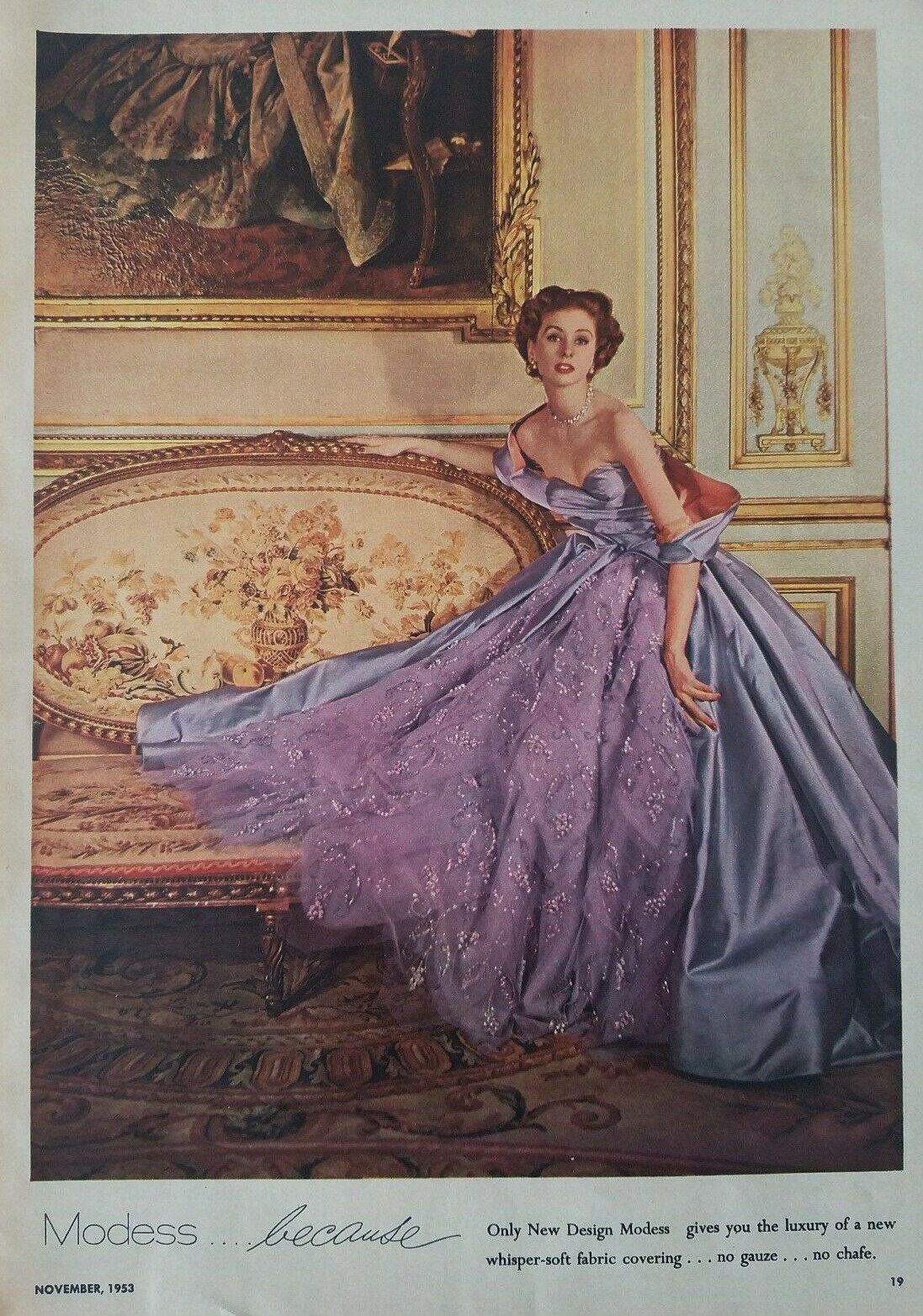
Suzy Parker in a Dior Gown, 1953

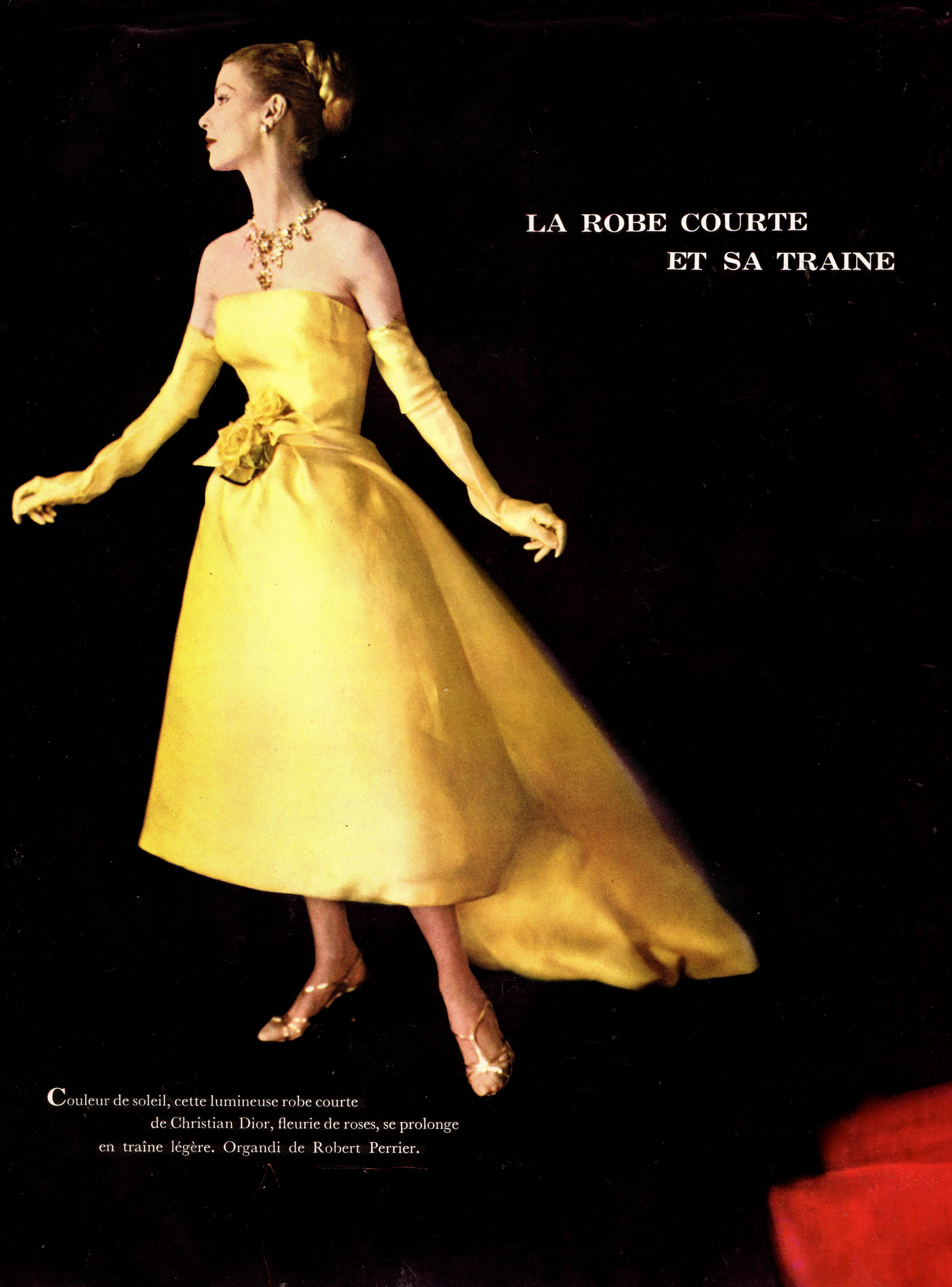
A Yellow Organdy Gown

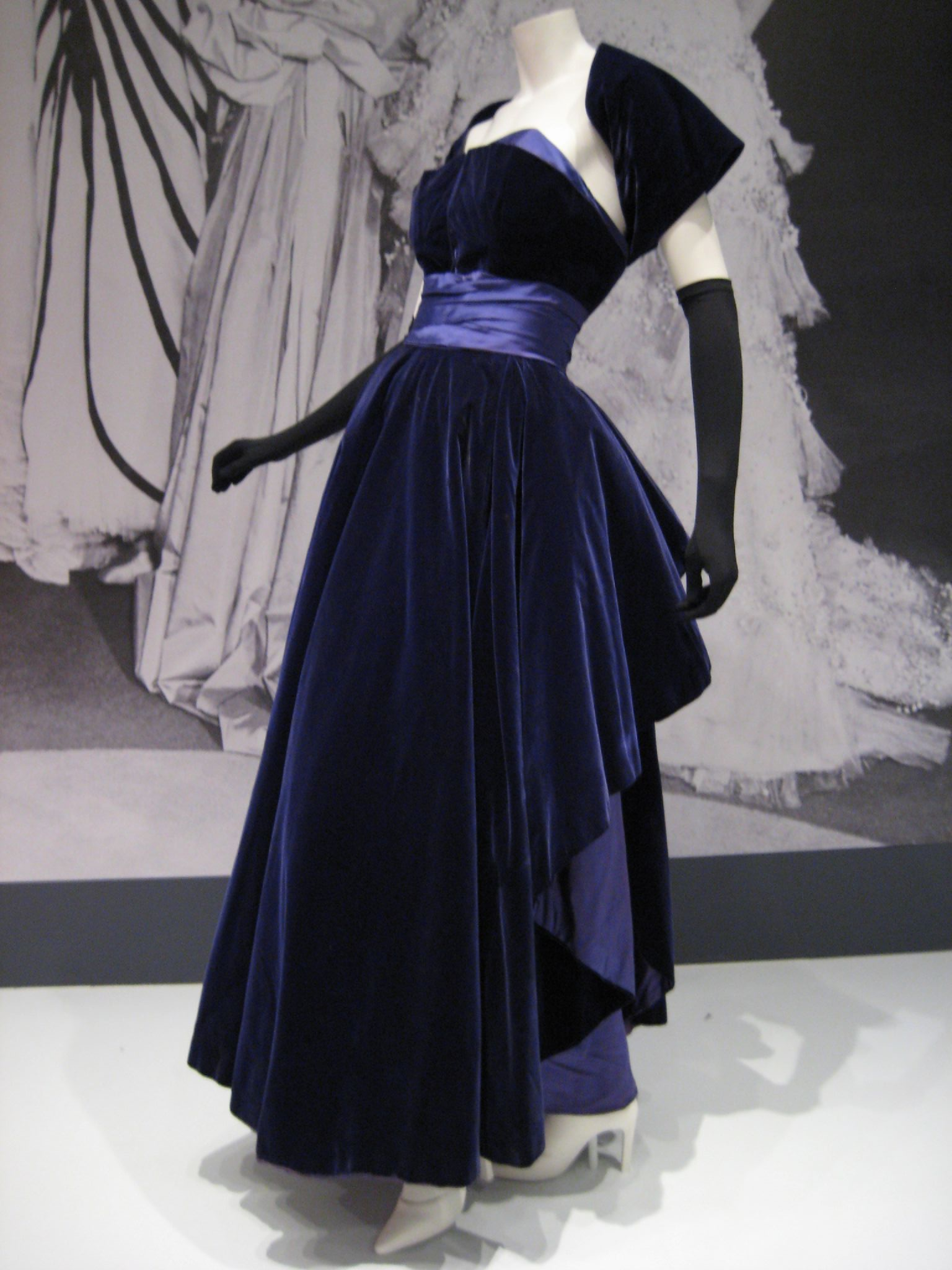
A 1948 Velvet Gown

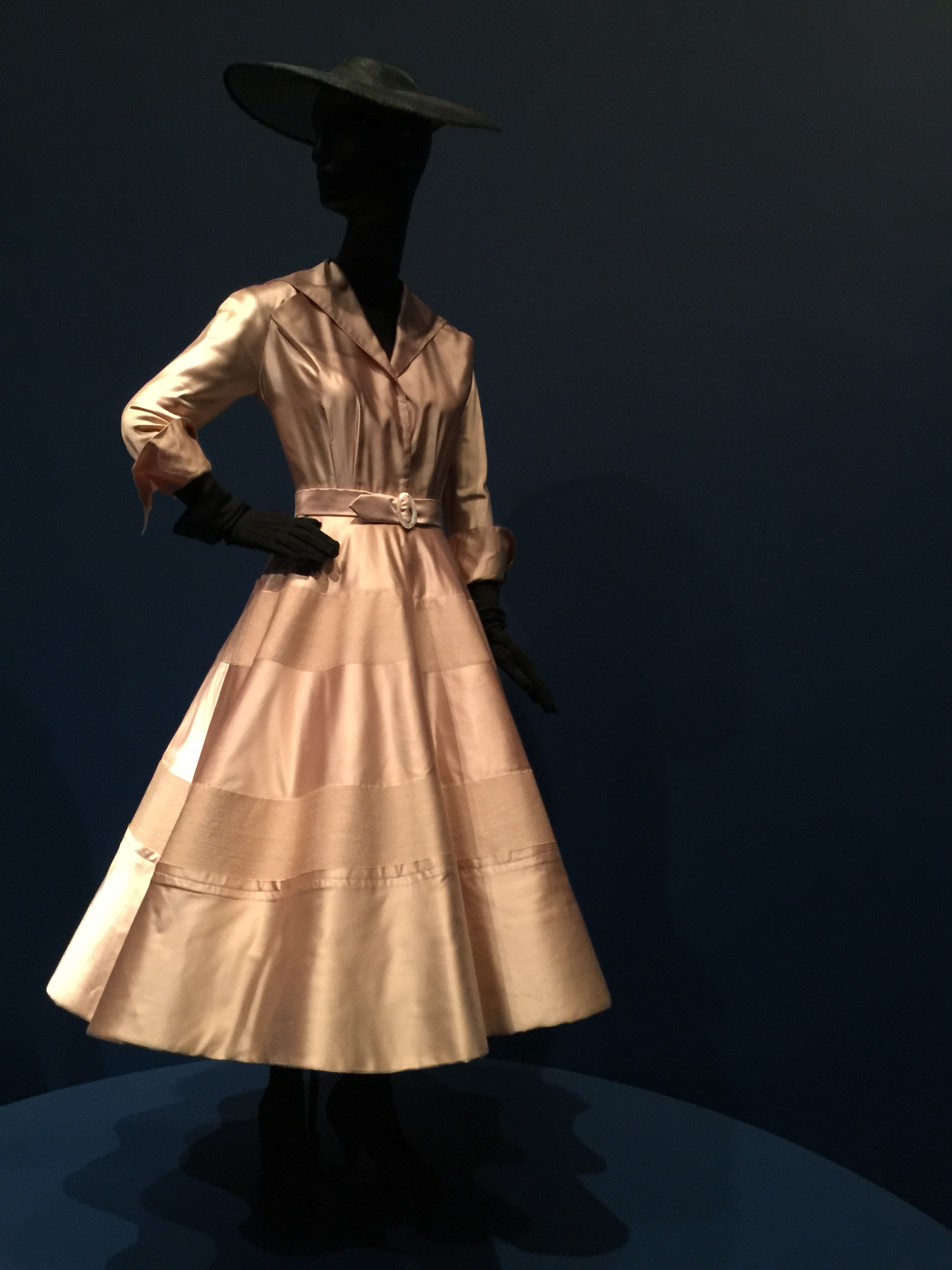
Day Ensemble, 1948

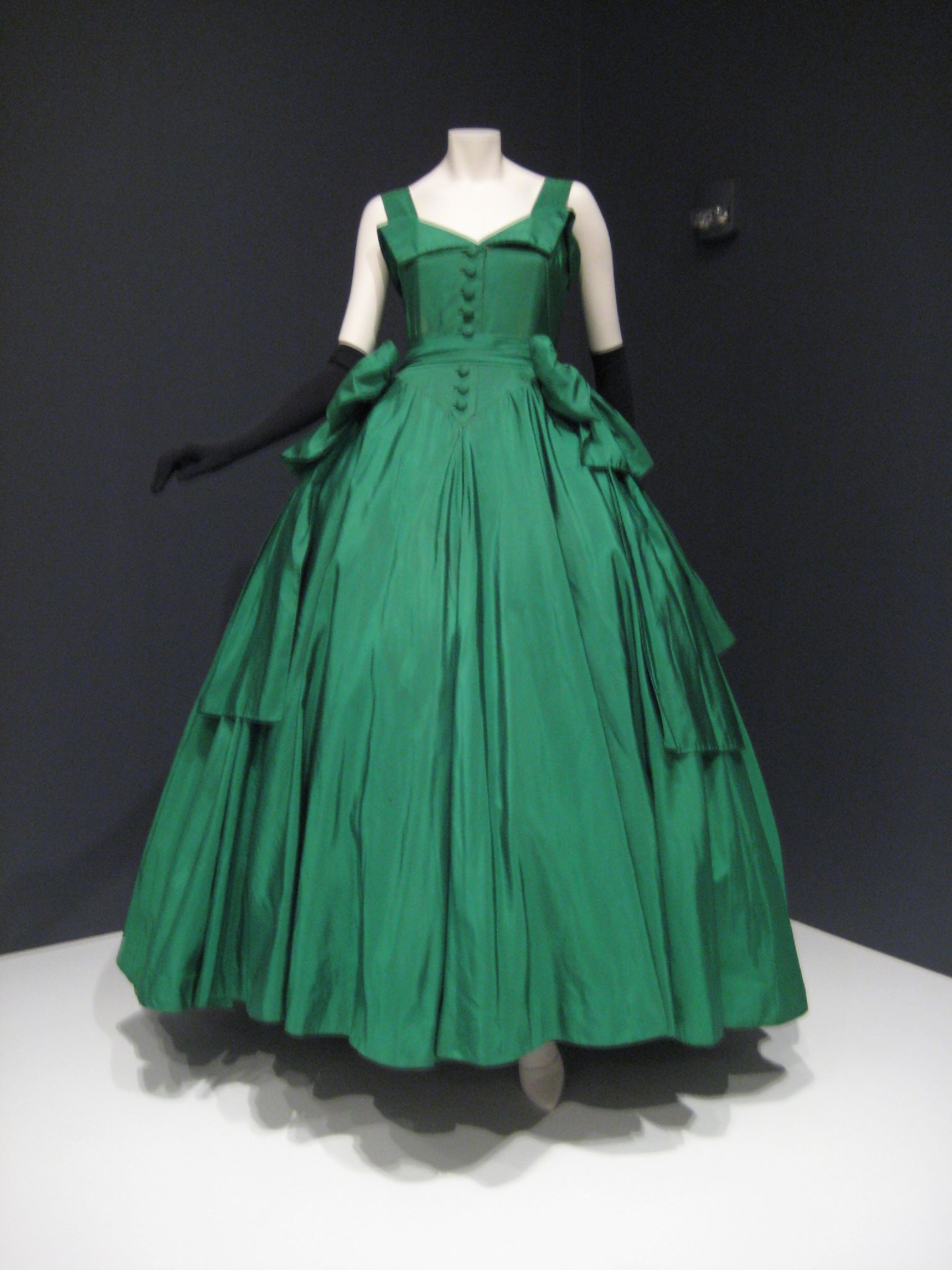
A 1954 Gown

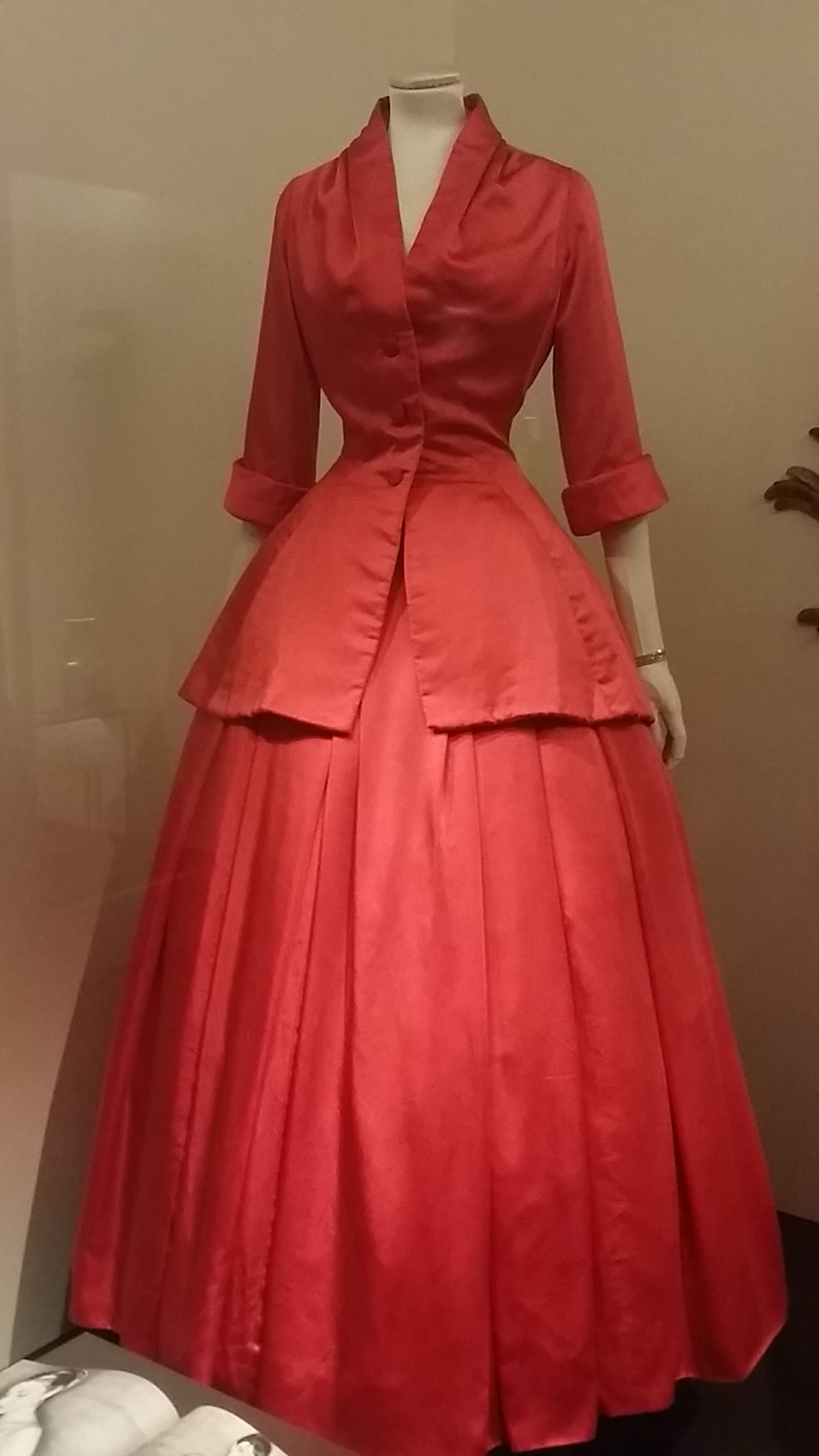
The "Zemire" Gown, 1954

Christian Ernest Dior (French: [kʁistjɑ̃ djɔʁ]; 21 January 1905 – 24 October 1957) was a French fashion designer and founder of one of the world's top fashion houses, Christian Dior SE. He was one of the Big Four of 1950s haute couture, the others being Jacques Fath, Pierre Balmain and Jean Dessès. Dior believed that fashion was more than clothing; that it was an art form and a continuation of French cultural heritage. His "New Look" revolutionized women's dress, and re-established Paris as the centre of the fashion world after World War II.

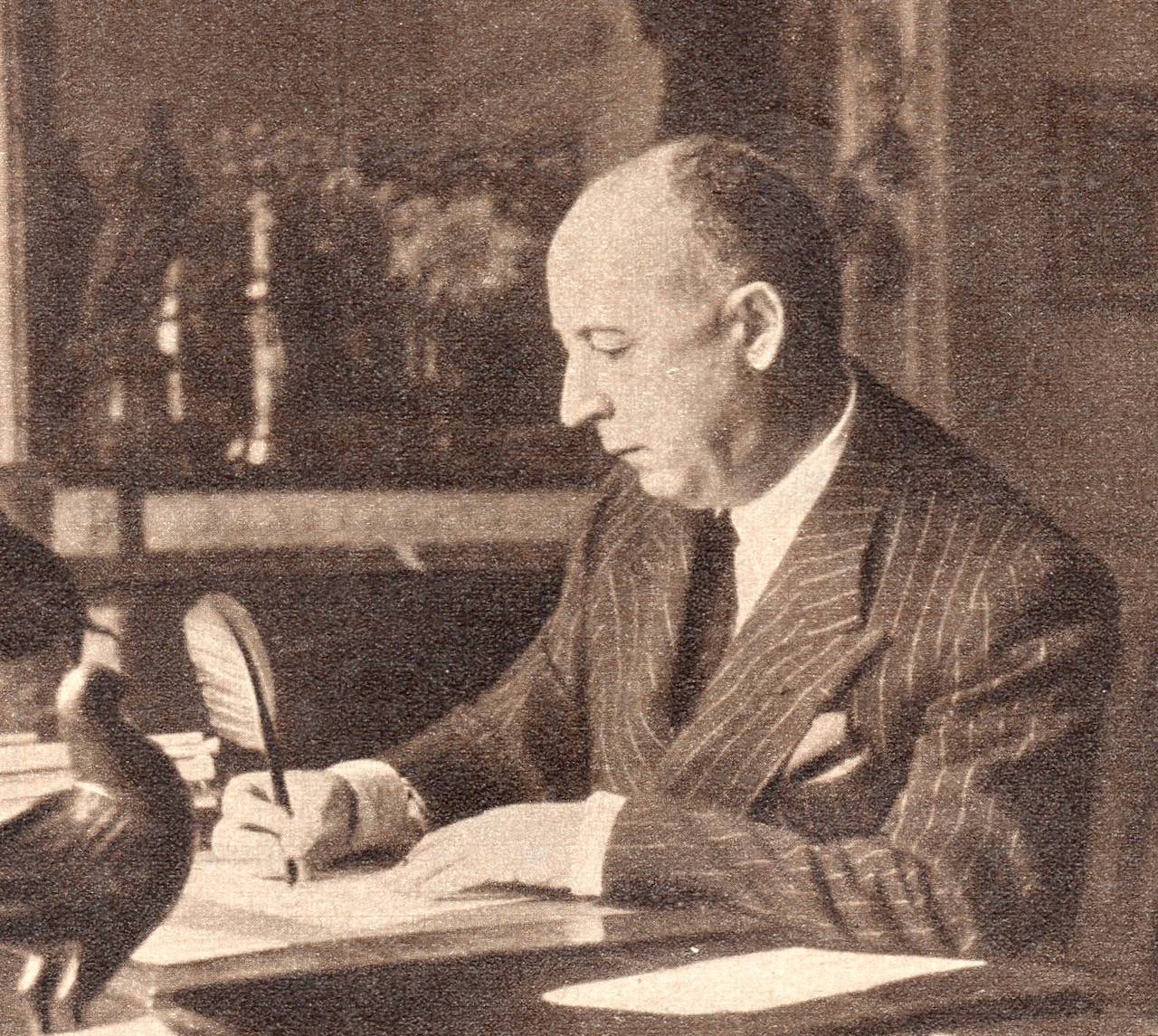
Christian Dior (1954)

== Early life and education ==
Dior was born in Granville, a seaside town on the coast of Normandy, France. He was the second of five children born to Maurice Dior (1872–1946), head of his family's fertilizer and chemical firm Dior Frères, and his wife Madeleine Martin (1879–1931). In 1911, the family moved full-time to a new home in Paris, where Christian attended the Lycée Janson-de-Sailly, graduating in 1923. As his parents hoped he would become a diplomat, he enrolled at the Paris Institute of Political Studies but was not interested in his studies and dropped out in 1926.

== Career ==
In 1928, with his friend Jacques Bonjean, and funding from his father, Dior opened an art gallery at 34 rue La Boétie, the Galerie Jacques Bonjean, which exhibited works by, among others, Pablo Picasso, Georges Braque, and Henri Matisse. During the Depression, Dior's father lost his business; with no funding, the gallery closed in 1931. One of the gallery's employees, Pierre Colle, had opened a gallery at nearby 29, rue Cambacérès; Dior joined him at Galerie Pierre Colle, where they became the dealers of Alexander Calder, Alberto Giacometti and Salvador Dali. At the end of 1933, the pair ran out of money and had to close the gallery. By now, Dior had contracted tuberculosis; he went to his family's smaller country home in Callian, where it took him a year to recover. While he was recovering, he started sketching fashion and sending the drawings to couture houses; his sketches were purchased by the House of Patou, the House of Worth, and Elsa Schiaparelli, Maggy Rouff, and Edward Molyneux. He was able to return to Paris, where he worked as a sketch artist for Le Figaro and Le Jardin des Modes.

In 1938, Dior was hired by Robert Piguet, who gave him the opportunity to design for three collections. It was Piguet who brought Dior into the world of haute couture, and Dior would later say: "Robert Piguet taught me that a garment is about fabric, colors, shapes, and the woman living inside it—and that fittings are what truly matter. He taught me the virtues of simplicity through which true elegance must come." With the outbreak of the war in 1939, Dior left Piguet to complete his compulsory military service, spending two years in the army's 47th Infantry Division. He returned to Occupied Paris, where he was hired by Lucien Lelong. As head of the Chambre Syndicale de la Couture, Lelong had skillfully convinced the Germans to allow the fashion houses to stay open, saving 28,000 jobs in the process. Like Piguet, Lelong did not design as much as supervise and mentor the designers who worked for him, and Dior spent the war learning from Lelong and working with Balmain and Hubert de Givenchy, among others. He also began designing costumes for films, beginning with Le lit à colonnes in 1942.

=== The House of Dior ===
In late 1946, Marcel Boussac, a textile manufacturer and one of the wealthiest men in France, invited Dior to help resurrect the house of Philippe et Gaston. Dior declined; he wanted his own house. Boussac agreed to finance it and gave Dior ten million francs, along with a business manager, Jacques Rouèt. Dior was guaranteed creative control and one-third of the profits. The house opened on 8 October 1946, on 30 Avenue Montaigne, with 85 staff members, seven models, and a salon decorated, by Victor Grandpierre and Christian Bérard, in black, white and gray. His head of millinery was also his muse, Mitzah Bricard. On 12 February 1947, the House of Dior presented its first collection, "Corolla", which was 90 garments displayed in ensembles. Dior's designs caused a sensation, in part because it was a time of austerity and he was presenting luxurious clothing in cambric-lined silk and satin. Dior explained: "We came from an epoch of war and uniforms, with women like soldiers with boxers' shoulders. I designed flower women, soft shoulders, full busts, waists as narrow as lianas and skirts as corollas." Harper's Bazaar editor Carmel Snow called it "The New Look", and the term came to apply to the style of Dior, and others, for the next five years.

==== Style ====
The Corolla line was drawn from Edwardian era styles, with Dior refining and crystallizing trends in skirt shape and waistline that had been burgeoning since the 1930s. The house employed Pierre Cardin as head of tailoring for its first three years; it was he who designed one of the most popular Corolla ensembles, the "Bar Suit", which was purchased by buyers worldwide. Dior's fall 1947 collection, the Figure of Eight, continued with longer, more bell-shaped skirts, more bust emphasis, bulkier coats, and an alternate narrow silhouette with small shoulders and waists. To achieve the look, however, women needed a complicated selection of undergarments which, in itself, caused enough of a stir that Pathé News made a short film about it. Each season thereafter, Dior would feature a new "line": the Envol and Cloche lines in 1948, the Pockets and Blused lines in 1949, the Vertical and Oblique lines in 1950, the Oval and Long lines in 1951, the Sinueuse and Profilėe lines in 1952, the Tulipe and Vivante/Cupola lines in 1953, the Muguet/Lily of the Valley and H-Line of 1954, the A-Line and Y-Line in 1955, the Aimant/Magnet line in 1956, and the Libre/Free and Fuseau/Spindle lines of 1957.

Dior's 1954 H-line was met with controversy because it had the effect of binding the torso from the neckline to the hips, and flattened the bust. His intention was to give an impression of youth by freeing the waist and lifting the bust, but critics pronounced the silhouette "flat" and too similar to the flapper look of the late 1920s. The bust-binding would be fleeting, but the emphasis on youth and a less constrained waist would continue into the 1960s. The tension between heavily structured clothes and more relaxed, comfortable clothes characterized 1950s fashion, with Jacques Fath and Simonetta among those favoring heavy structure and Chanel and Balmain on the side of ease and comfort. The move toward ease could be seen in several of Dior's collections, and his spring 1952 Sinueuse line comprised soft blouses, cardigans, and skirts. All Dior collections from 1955 onward were less confining, although he, and almost all 1950s designers, presented hobbling sheath skirts throughout the decade.

The other source of occasional controversy for Dior was hemlines, an obsession in the 1950s. His fall 1953 Cupola line included some skirts that raised the hemline to lengths that were startling to many. Though they still covered the knee, they were short enough to inspire protest—in the US, the anti-Dior Little Below the Knee Club was founded. His fall 1956 Aimant line contained a handful of day skirts that dropped the hemline almost to the ankle, another startling move to some observers.

==== Expansion ====
Dior's success was sufficiently rapid that the House of Dior produced accessories of all kinds, including hats, scarves, handbags and jewellery. In 1947, the ground floor of the atelier became Colifichets ("trifles"), a tiny boutique decorated in red and white, which became Dior's first retail store. It was so successful that it eventually expanded to sell ready-to-wear clothing with the Colifichets label. In October 1948, Dior opened his second store, this time on New York's Fifth Avenue, where he offered an exclusive assortment designed specifically for American women and their more casual lifestyle. From here, he provided his products to department stores throughout the US and Canada. He was not the first to do so; couturiers such as Fath and Marcelle Dormoy had been licensing their designs to American clothing manufacturers for some time, and Dessès and Balmain would soon follow. However, with his profitability and Boussac's deep pockets, he was able to offer ready-to-wear clothing, and at a much larger scale. By the one-year anniversary of the store's opening, Dior's products accounted for 75% of French fashion exports and 5% of France’s annual export revenue.

In 1949, he toured the US, visiting department stores, hosting shows, and signing new clients. He encountered legal problems when he was called before the American Anti-Trust Division for what he described as a "terrifying examination" over his insistence that clients sign a contract to not copy his designs, an experience that taught him that "the pillaging of artistic creation is not only authorized in the United States, but encouraged." Dior was preoccupied with fraud. He learned that forgers were circulating albums of reproduced drawings, writing: "In 1955 alone, more than 1,000 subscribers procured about 300 models [designs] from the collections of the principal French couturiers. One hundred and forty-two of my own models figured in the album, of which 57 were exact copies." His showings strictly prohibited sketching and were carefully policed; buyers had to agree not to allow any of his dresses to be passed on to other members of the fashion trade. Each dress bore a secret mark underneath the lining to catch anyone who broke their word.

In 1953, Dior entered into a collaborative relationship with the American shoe manufacturer Herman Delman, who, beginning in 1938, was the employer of the French shoe designer Roger Vivier. Dior had always worked with the most prominent footwear designer of the time, André Perugia; now he was co-designing shoes with Delman and Vivier. Until 1962, shoes contained the label 'Delman-Dior' or 'Dior-Delman'. The three men worked together; Dior might begin a dress design from a Vivier shoe design, and that design may have been created at the request, or inspiration of, Herman Delman. Delman and Dior established a made-to-order division in Paris, which continued well into the 1960s.

Dior created his first fragrance, Miss Dior, in 1947. To manage Parfums Dior, he partnered with a friend from Granville, Serge Heftler-Louiche, who was the general manager of Parfums Coty. Miss Dior was followed by Diorama in 1948, Eau Fraiche in 1952, and Diorissimo in 1956. By then, the House of Dior in Paris had expanded to seven stories and 28 workrooms. Parfums Christian Dior and Christian Dior Hosiery were established in Paris and New York. In 1952, C.D. Models was founded in London, and a replica of the retail boutique was opened in Caracas. Jacques Rouët had devised a licensing program that now included ties, hosiery, furs, hats, gloves, handbags, jewelry, lingerie, and scarves. Dior's peers at the Fédération de la Haute Couture et de la Mode denounced this as the cheapening of couture and damaging to the image of high fashion, but Rouët's licensing plan would become the template followed by all large brands going forward. In 1952, the New York Times reported that "the gross annual income of the eight Christian Dior companies, in France and overseas, comes to $17,000,000".

By the mid-1950s, the Dior empire included eight companies and 16 affiliates, and employed 1,700 people on five continents. By the time the house celebrated its tenth anniversary in 1957, it had sold 100,000 garments. Though only 52, Dior, who was a workaholic and fond of eating, was succumbing to the effects of his life's frenetic pace and had suffered a heart attack. He was planning his retirement and named his 21-year-old assistant Yves Saint Laurent as his successor. After his death that year, the Christian Dior brand continued to grow in all areas; as of 2026, it was valued at over $20 billion (US).

== Personal life and death ==
Dior's sister Catherine (1917–2008), a member of the French Resistance, was captured by the Gestapo and spent the war in concentration camps. In 1947, Dior named his debut fragrance, Miss Dior, in tribute to her. The story of Dior’s life during WWII and the following few years is featured in the mini-series The New Look.

At the other end of the spectrum, Dior's niece Françoise, daughter of his brother Raymond, was dubbed a "true Nazi" and caused an uproar when, in Coventry in 1963, she married the British Neo-Nazi politician Colin Jordan.

Dior was known for being superstitious. Before making important decisions, he consulted his fortune-teller, Madame Delahaye, and his collections frequently featured talismanic symbols. He also carried a cluster of lucky charms with him, believing they brought him good fortune.

Christian Dior owned two homes. In Paris, he lived in a townhouse at 7, boulevard Jules-Sandeau. He also satisfied his long-standing obsession with architecture by buying and renovating the 19th-century Château de La Colle Noire in Montauroux; the chateau now belongs to Parfums Christian Dior.

While on vacation in Montecatini Terme, Italy, where he was recuperating from his second heart attack, Dior died of a third attack, on 24 October 1957. He was in the company of his lover, a 23 year-old singer named Jacques Benita, aka Tony Sandro. An estimated 9,000 people attended his funeral at the Église Saint-Honoré d'Eylau. It was a national event. He was buried on the grounds of the Château de la Colle Noire; as his coffin passed through cities and towns en route to his home, it was met with lines of women bearing flowers.

== Awards and honors ==
In 1950, Dior was awarded the Légion d'honneur, France's highest civilian honor. In 1947, he received the Neiman Marcus Award for his first collection. In 1956, he received the Parsons School of Design Distinguished Achievement Award. On March 4, 1957, Dior became the first fashion designer to be featured on the cover of Time. In 1955, he was nominated for the 1955 Academy Award for Best Costume Design (Black and White) for the costumes designed for Jennifer Jones in the 1953 film Terminal Station.

== Costume design ==
- Le lit à colonnes, for Michèle Alfa & Odette Joyeux, 1942
- Love Letters, for Odette Joyeux, 1942
- Les Roquevillard, for Mila Parély, 1943
- The Phantom Baron, for Odette Joyeux & Jany Holt, 1943
- Sylvie and the Ghost, for Odette Joyeux, 1945
- Pamela, for Renée Saint-Cyr & Yvette Lebon, 1945
- Échec au roy, for Odette Joyeux & Gabrielle Dorziat, 1945
- Man About Town, for Marcelle Derrien, 1947
- Passionnelle, for Odette Joyeux, 1947
- Days of Our Years, for Marie Daëms & Catherine Erard, 1950
- Stage Fright, for Marlene Dietrich, 1950
- Les Enfants terribles, for Nicole Stéphane, 1950
- The Paris Waltz, for Yvonne Printemps & Noëlle Norman, 1950
- Under the Sky of Paris, for Brigitte Auber, 1951
- No Highway in the Sky, for Marlene Dietrich, 1951
- It Happened in Paris, for Evelyn Keyes, 1952
- Terminal Station, for Jennifer Jones, 1953
- Daughters of Destiny: "Jeanne", for Michèle Morgan, 1954
- Death of a Cyclist, for Lucía Bosé, 1955
- Gentlemen Marry Brunettes, for Jane Russell & Jeanne Crain, 1955
- Anything Goes, for Mitzi Gaynor, 1956
- Loser Takes All, for Glynis Johns, 1956
- The Ambassador's Daughter, for Olivia de Havilland, 1956
- Paris, Palace Hotel, for Tilda Thamar, 1956
- Le pays d'où je viens, for Françoise Arnoul, 1956
- The Little Hut, for Rita Hayworth, 1957
- A Kiss for a Killer, for Mylène Demongeot & Isa Miranda, 1957
- Indiscreet, for Ingrid Bergman, 1958

== Documentaries ==
- The Christian Dior Story (1950)
- Person to Person (Interview), S3.E10 (1955)
- Les actualités Francais, No. 23 (1957)
- Men, Women and Clothes: "Informal Clothes" (1957)
- Chroniques de France No. 2, S1.E2 (1964)
- J'accuse: Christian Dior (1991)
- Christian Dior: The Man Behind the Myth (2005)
- Dior and I (2014)
- Oh Dior! (2017)
- Les dessins de Christian Dior (2018)

== Gallery ==
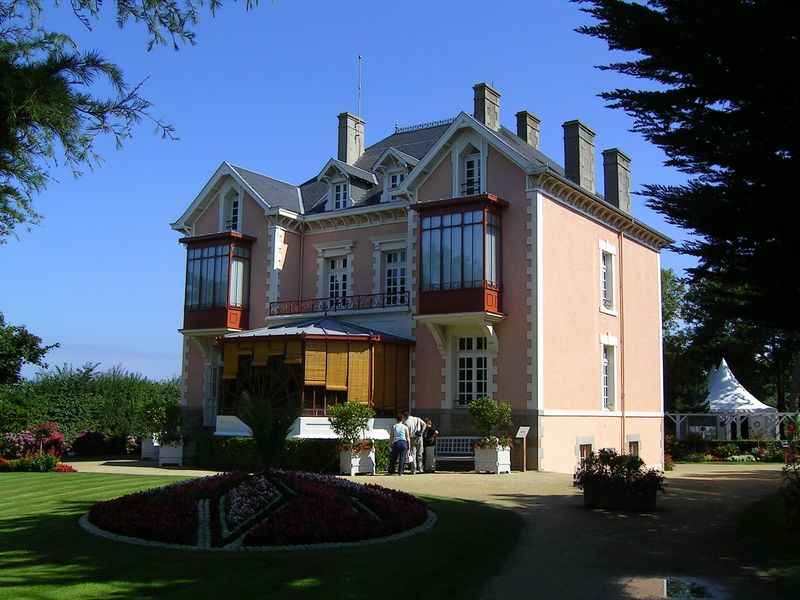
Les Rhumbs, the Dior Home and Museum in Granville

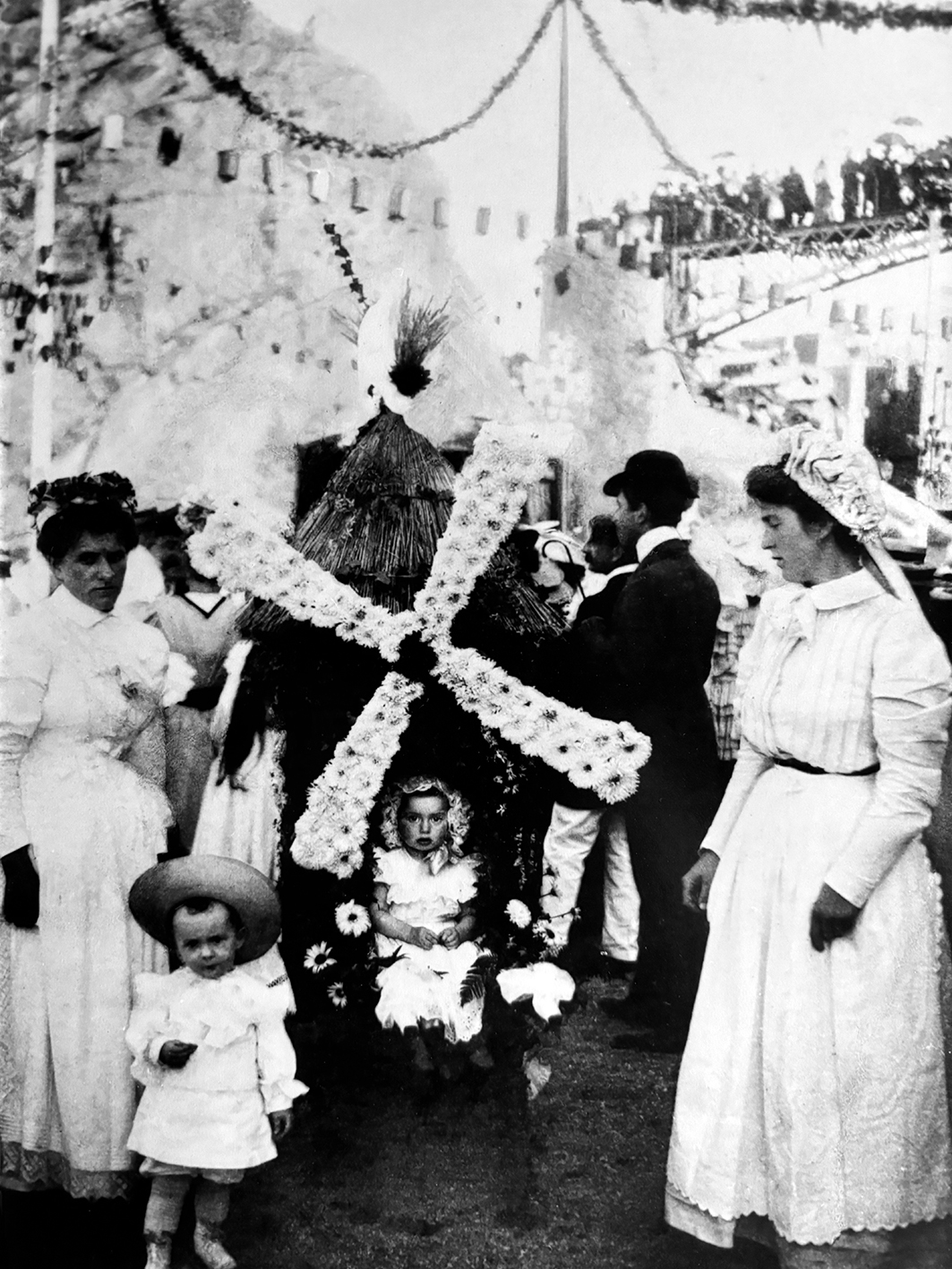
Christian Dior with Serge Heftler-Louiche at a 1908 carnival

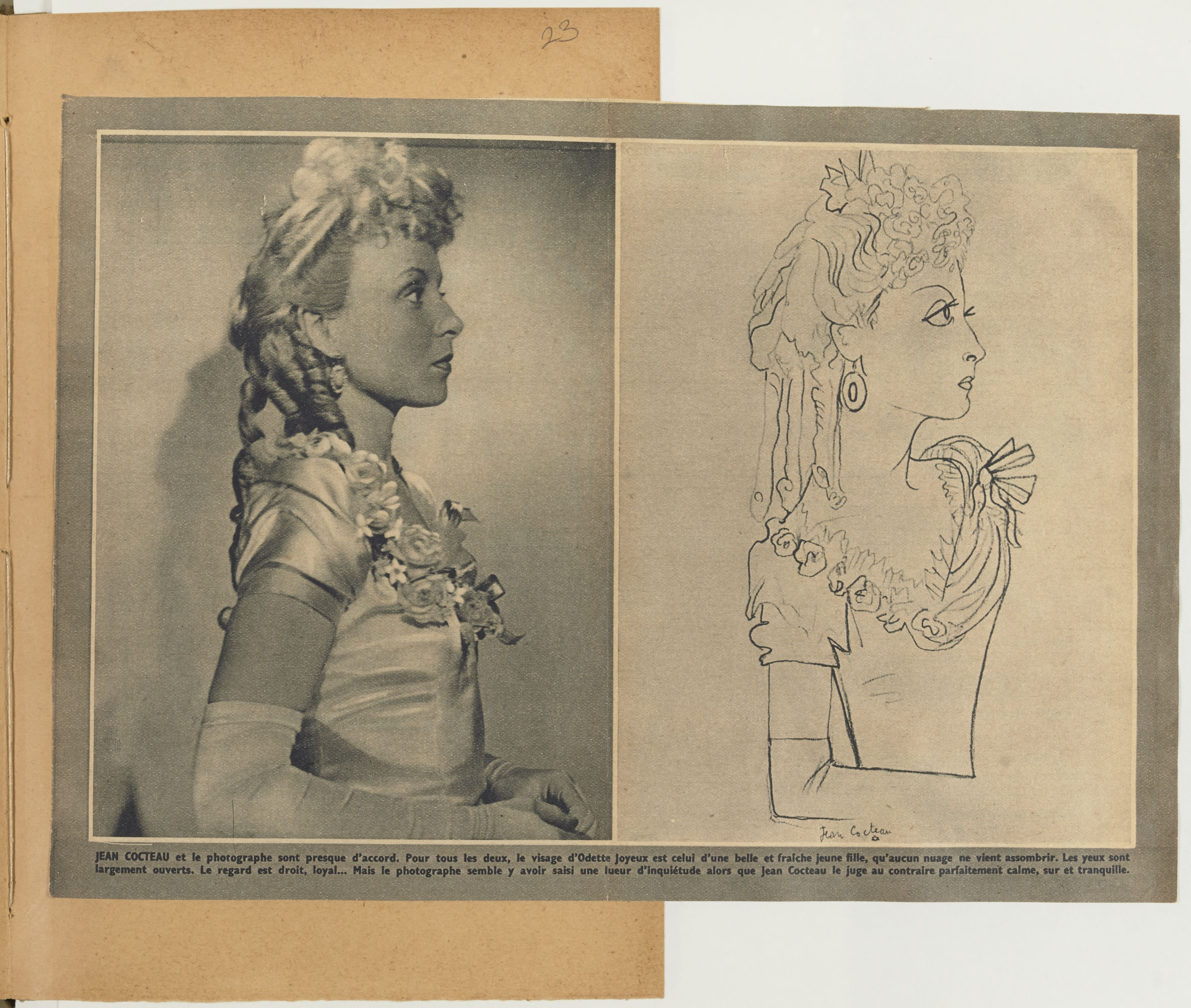
Dior's Costume Sketch for Le lit à colonnes, 1942

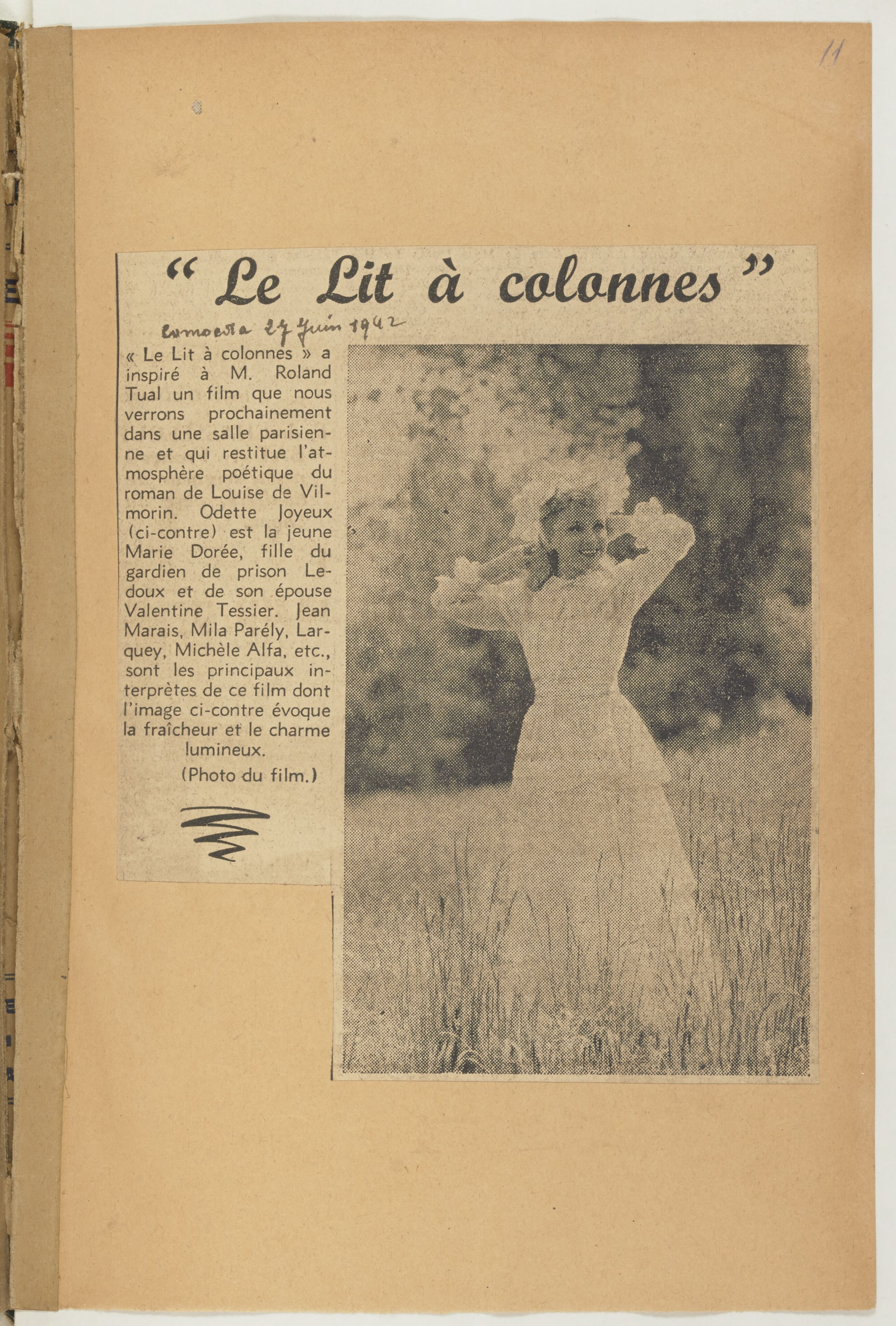
Dior's Costume Sketch for Le lit à colonnes, 1942

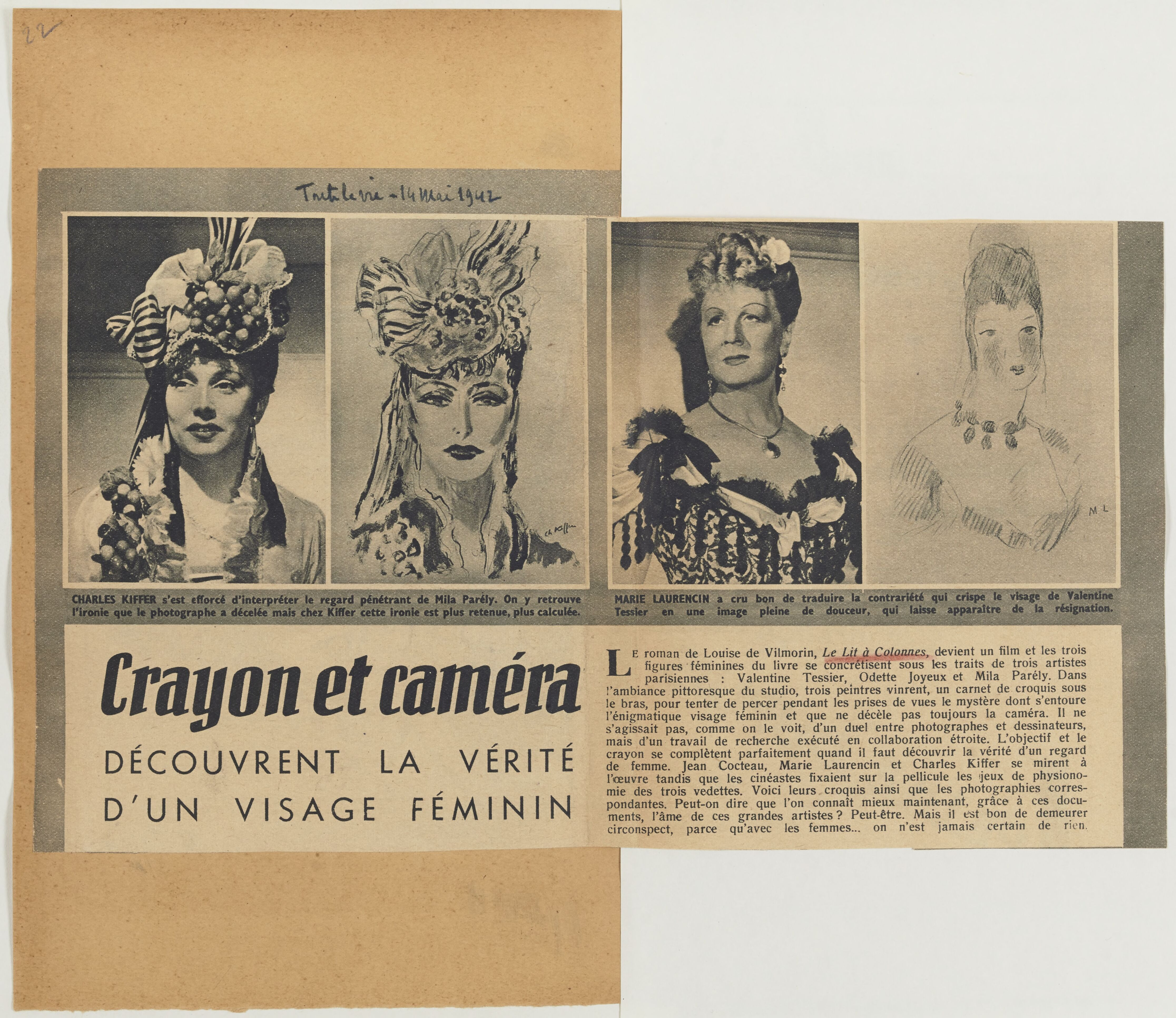
Dior's Costume Sketch for Le lit à colonnes, 1942

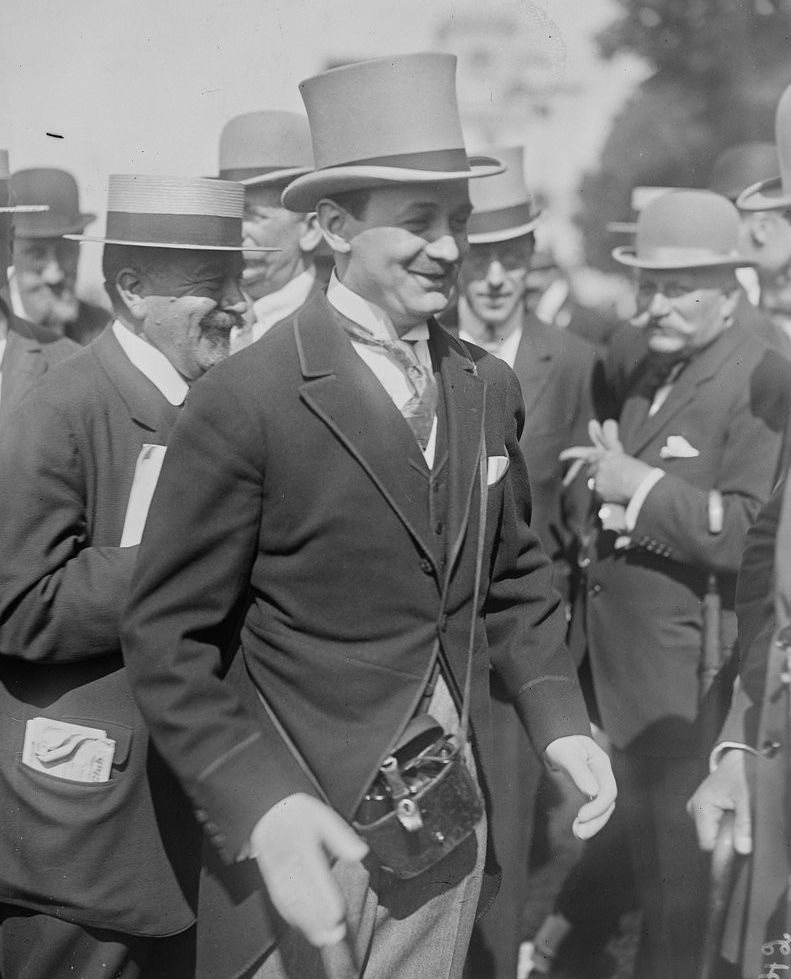
Marcel Boussac

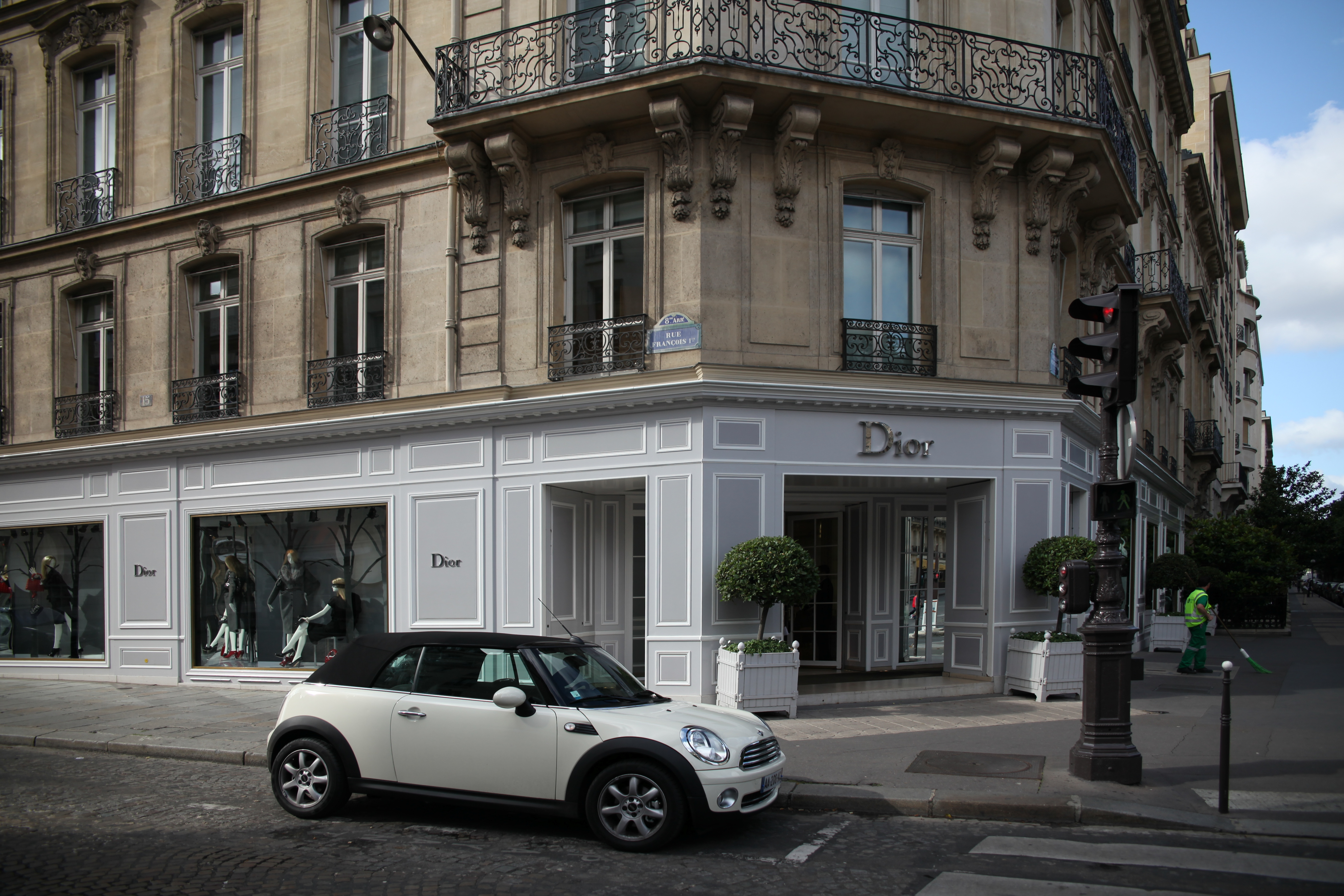
The House of Dior, 30 avenue Montaigne

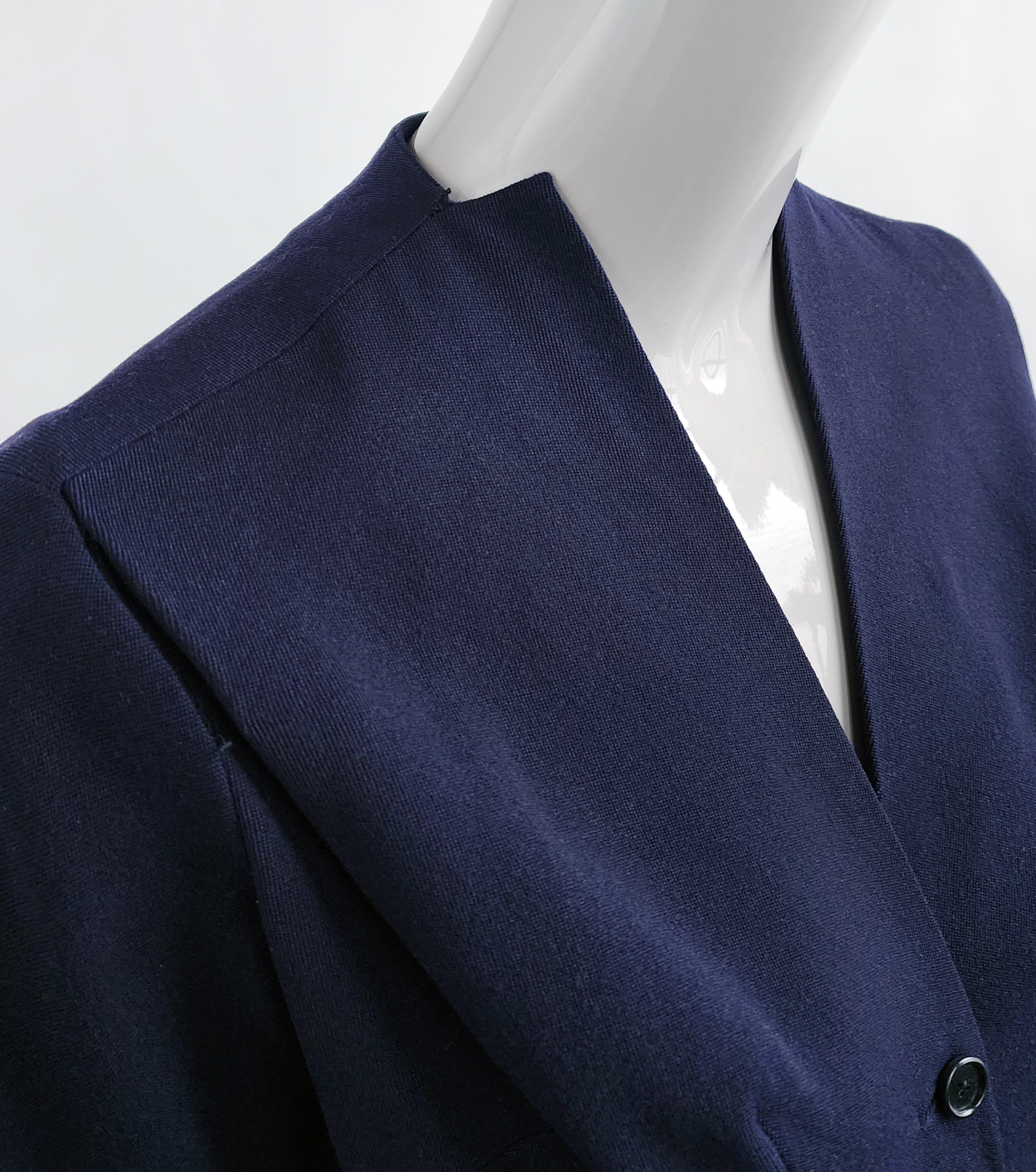
The 1947 "Zig-Zag" Dress (detail)

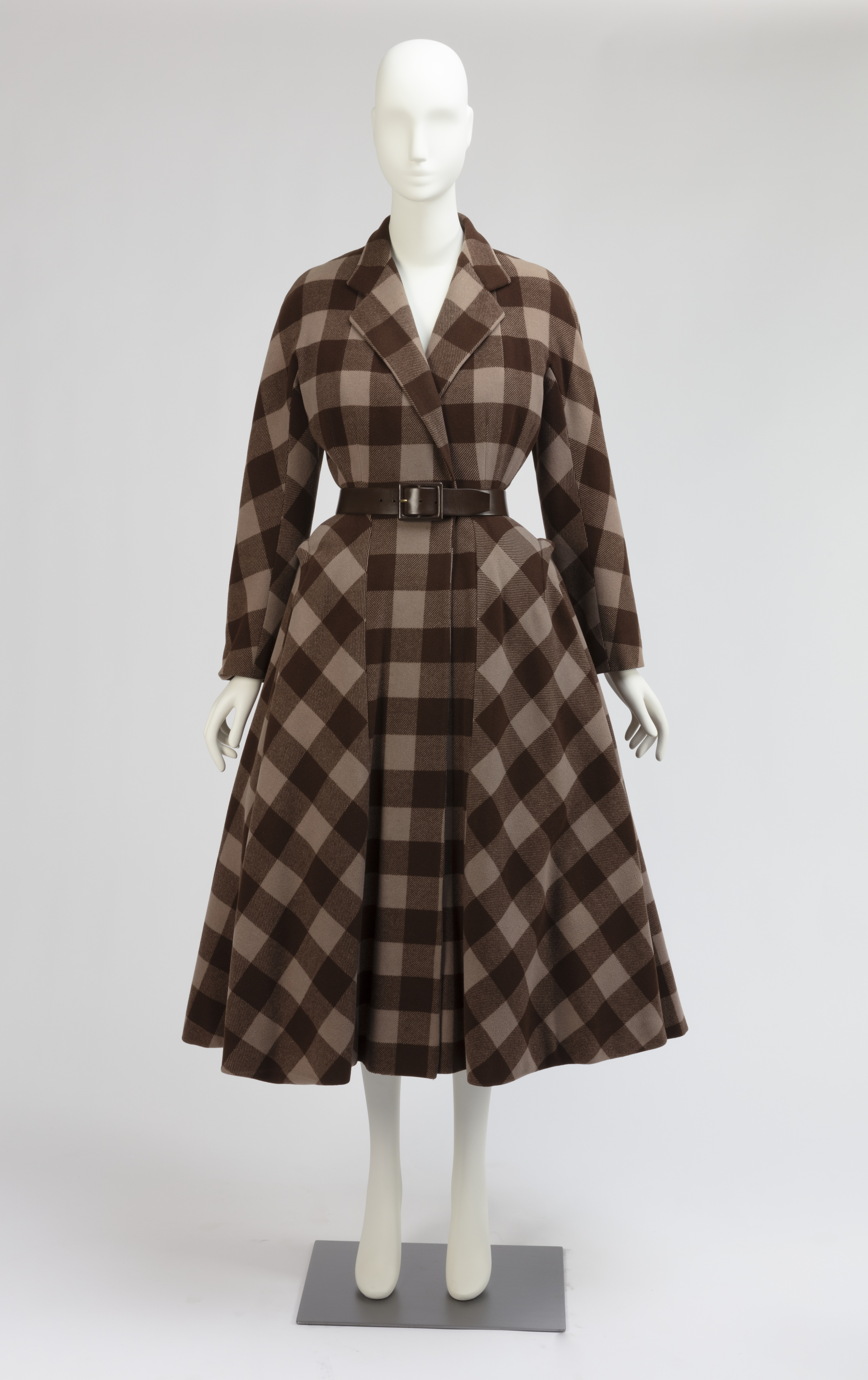
Plaid Coat, 1947

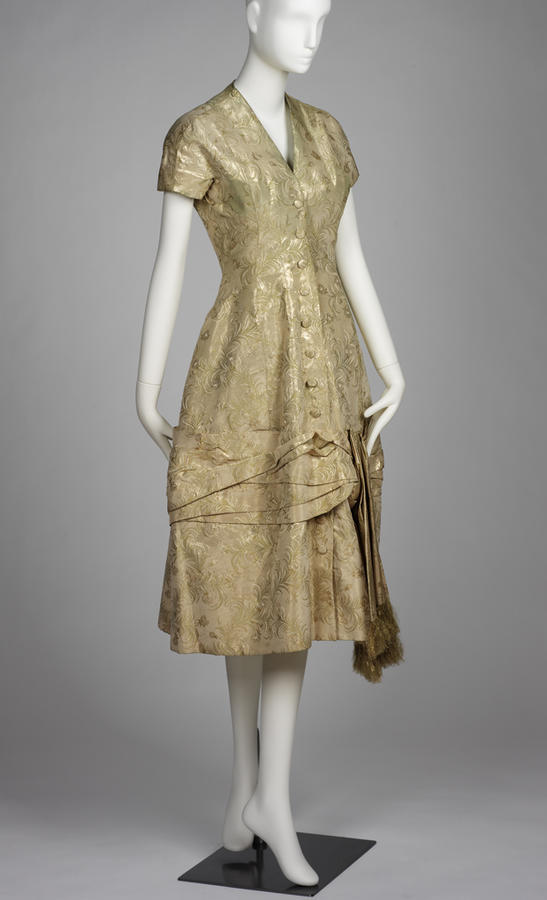
A 1950 Metallic Thread Silk Cocktail Dress

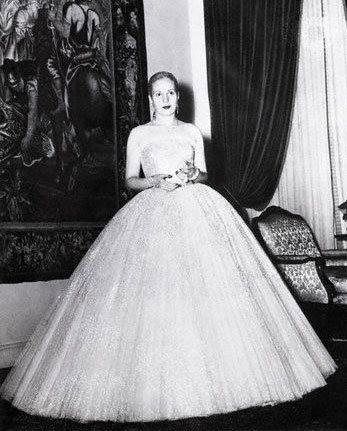
Eva Perón in Dior, 1949

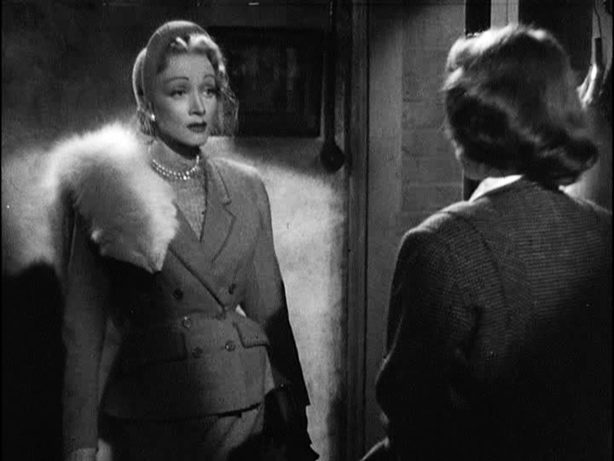
Marlene Dietrich in a Dior costume for Stage Fright, 1950

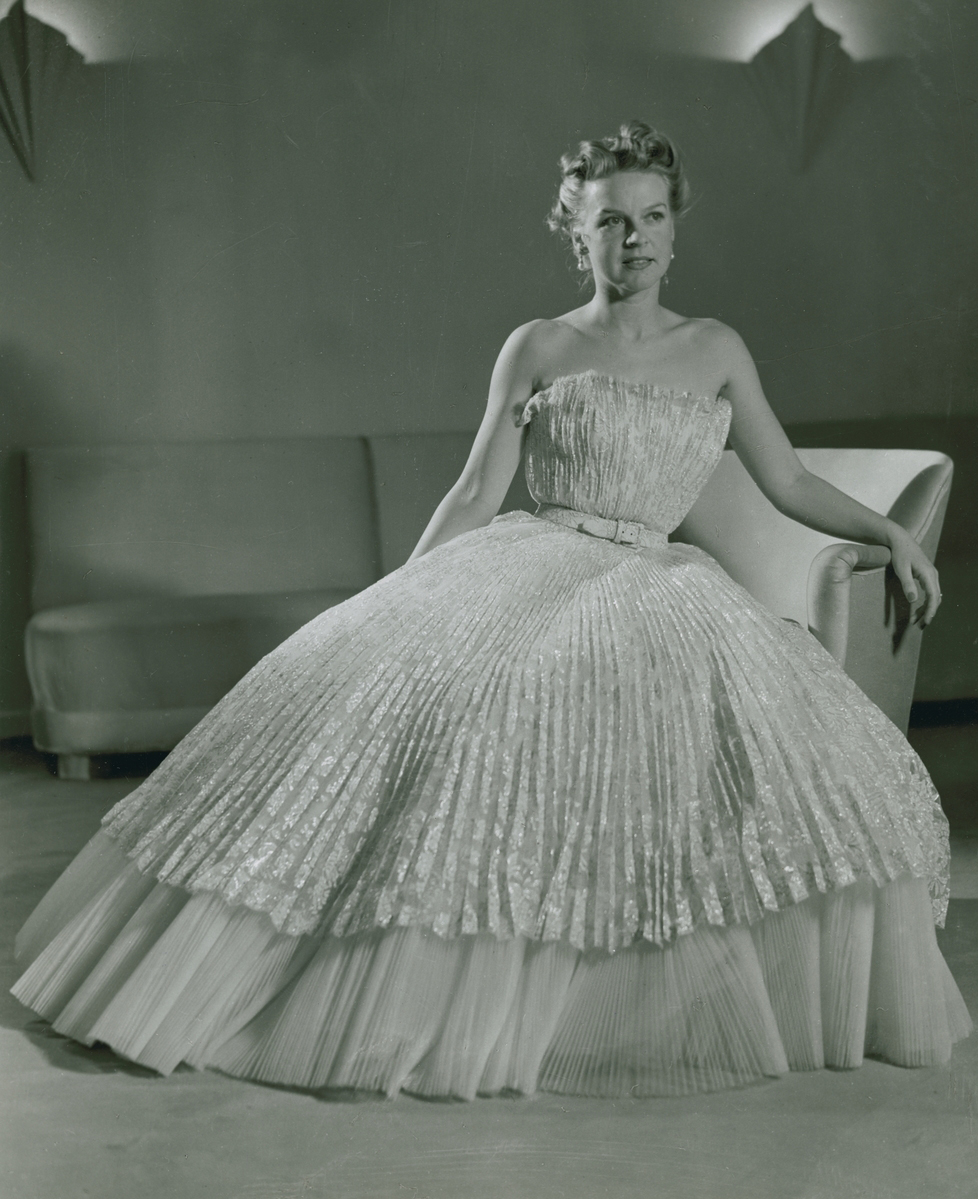
Baroness Märta Palmstierna in Dior, 1950

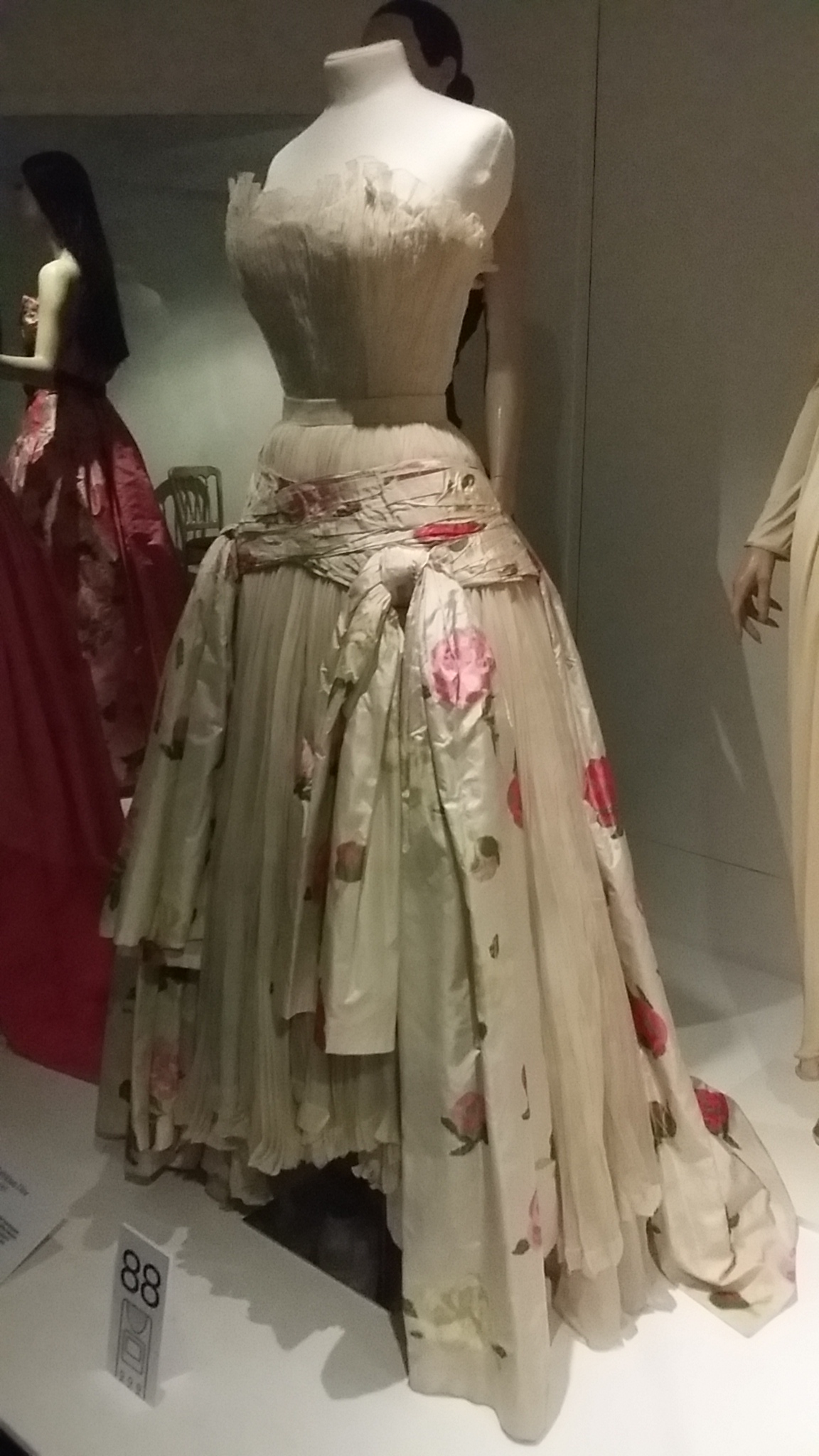
The "Henri Sauguet" Gown, 1950

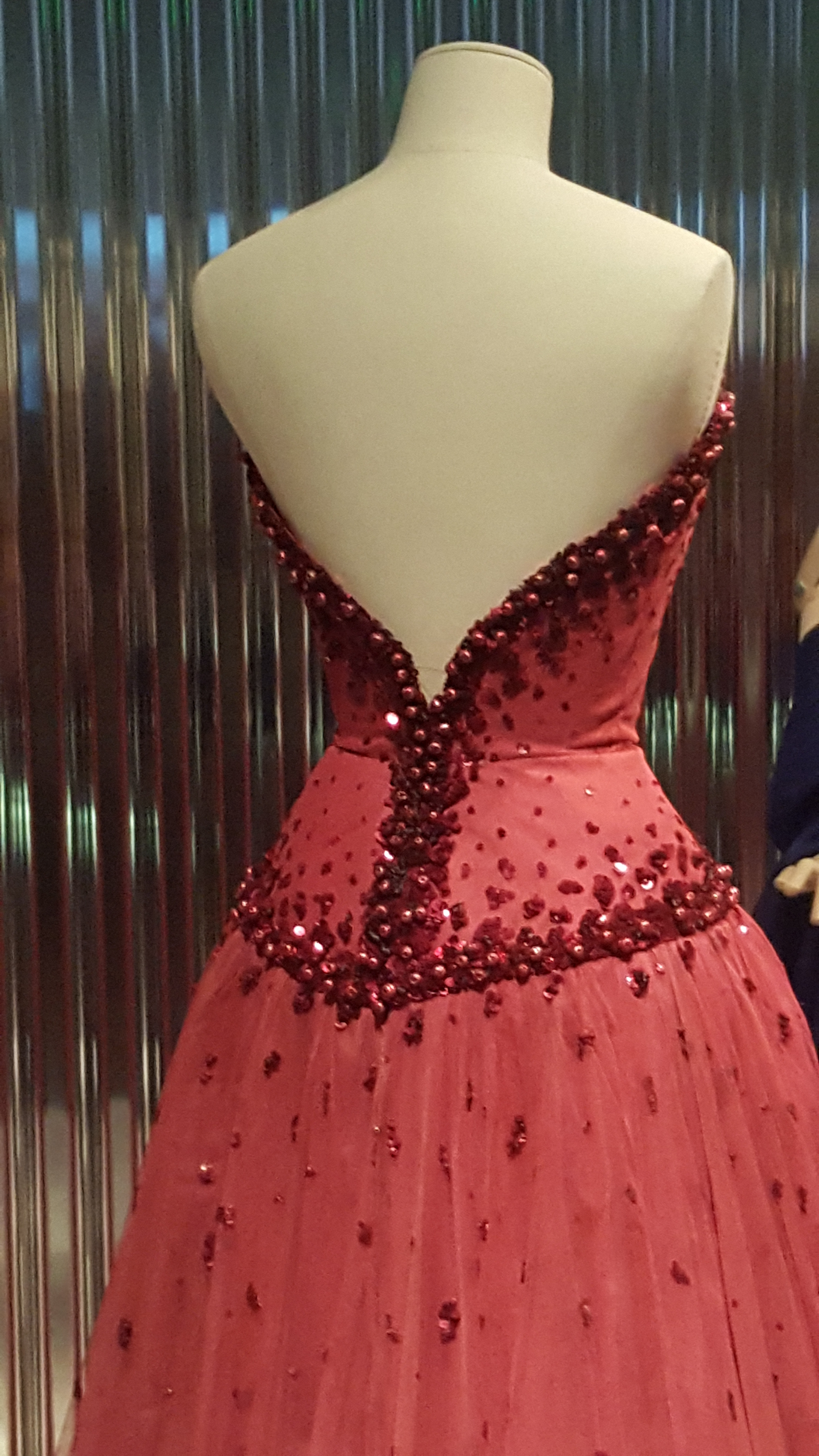
Detail of a 1950 Ball Gown

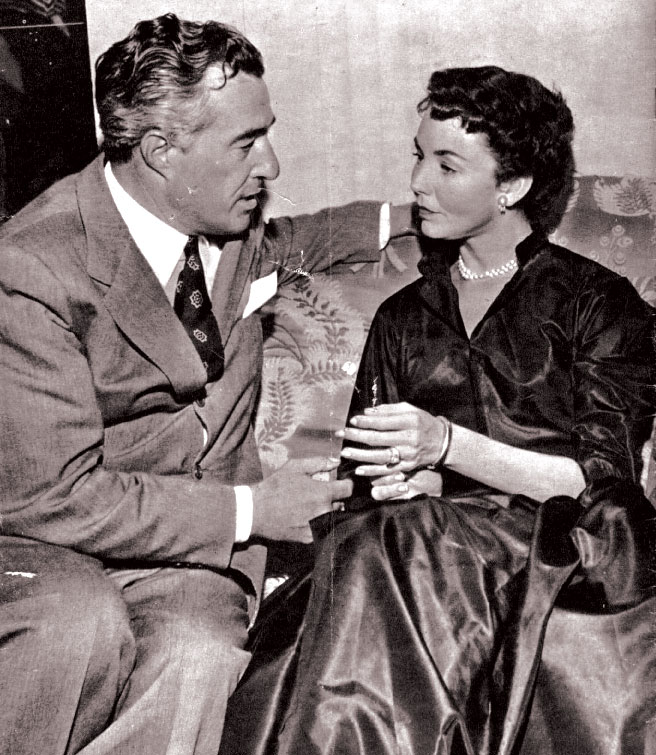
Jennifer Jones in Dior in Terminal Station, 1953

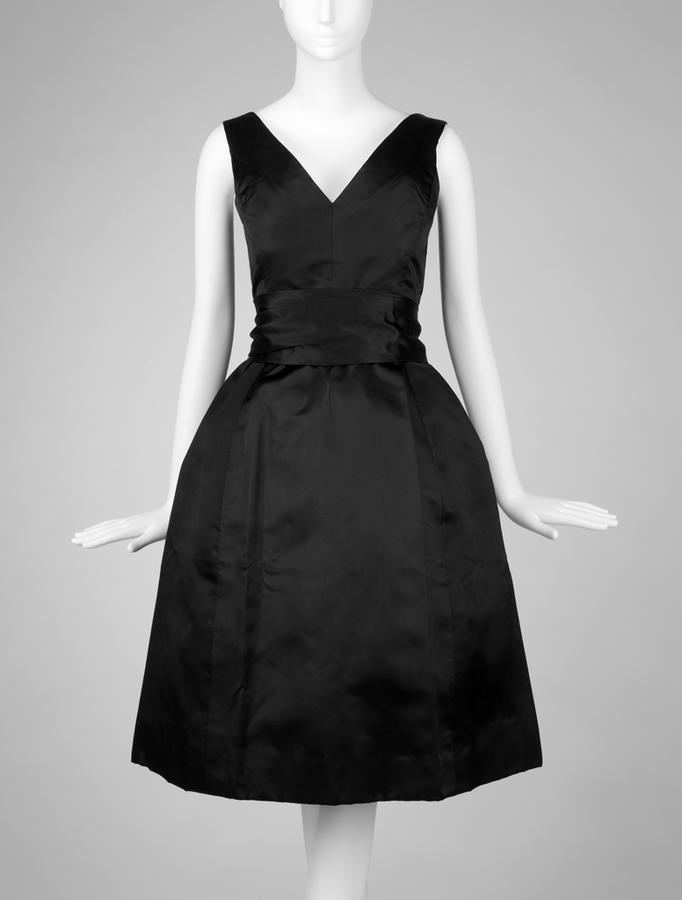
Satin Cocktail Dress, 1954

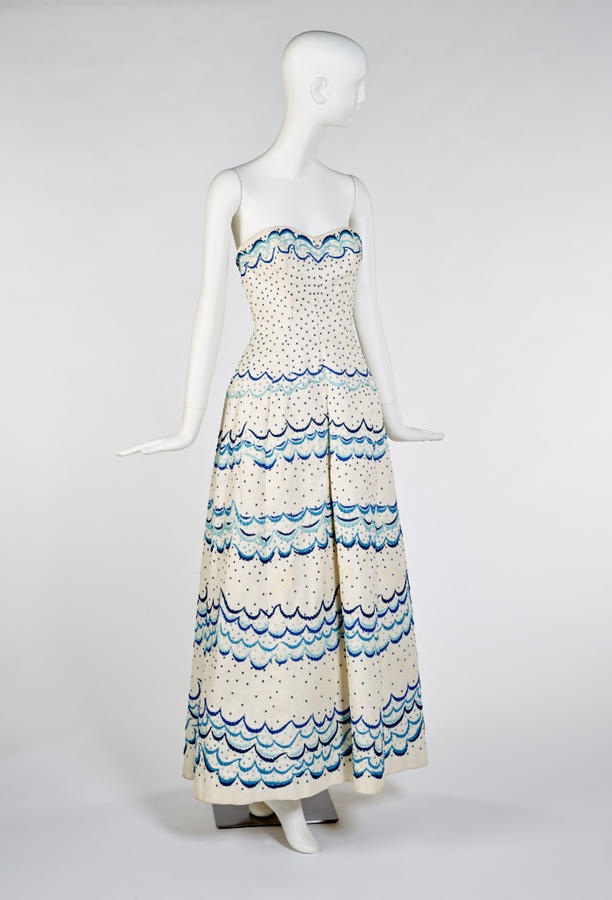
"Nuit d'Espagne", an embroidered cotton Evening Dress, 1954

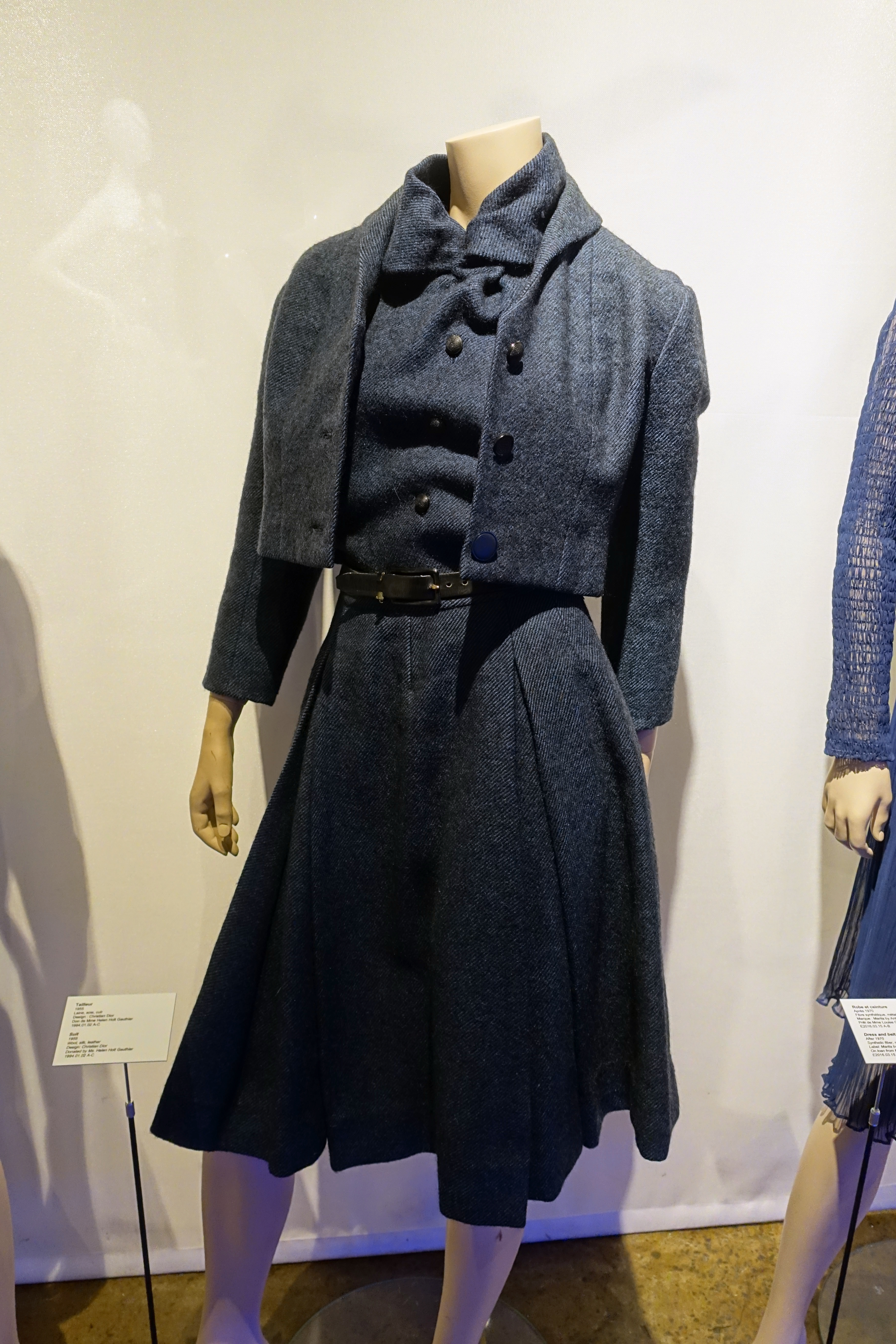
A 1955 Wool Suit

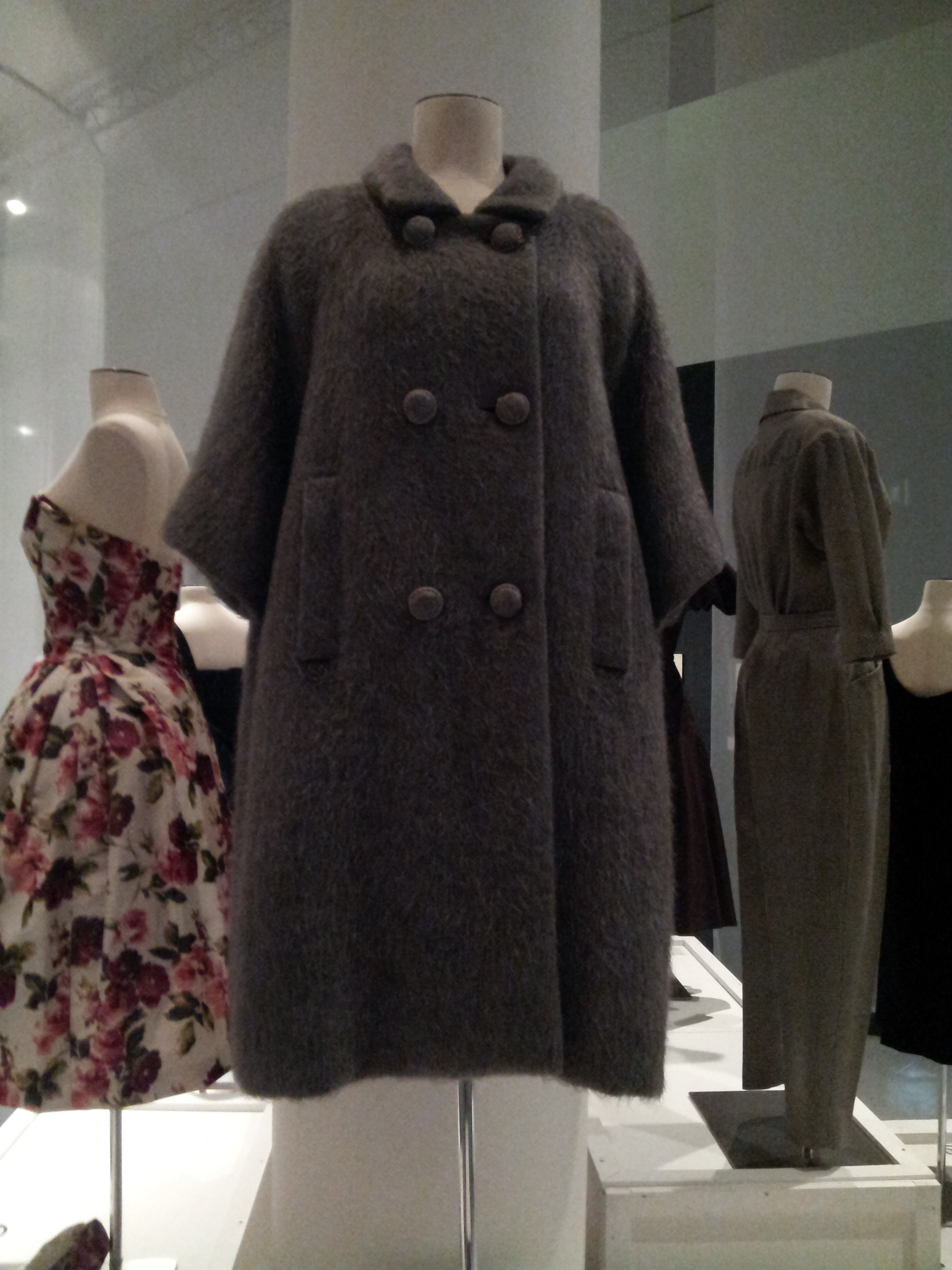
A 1957 Cashmere Coat

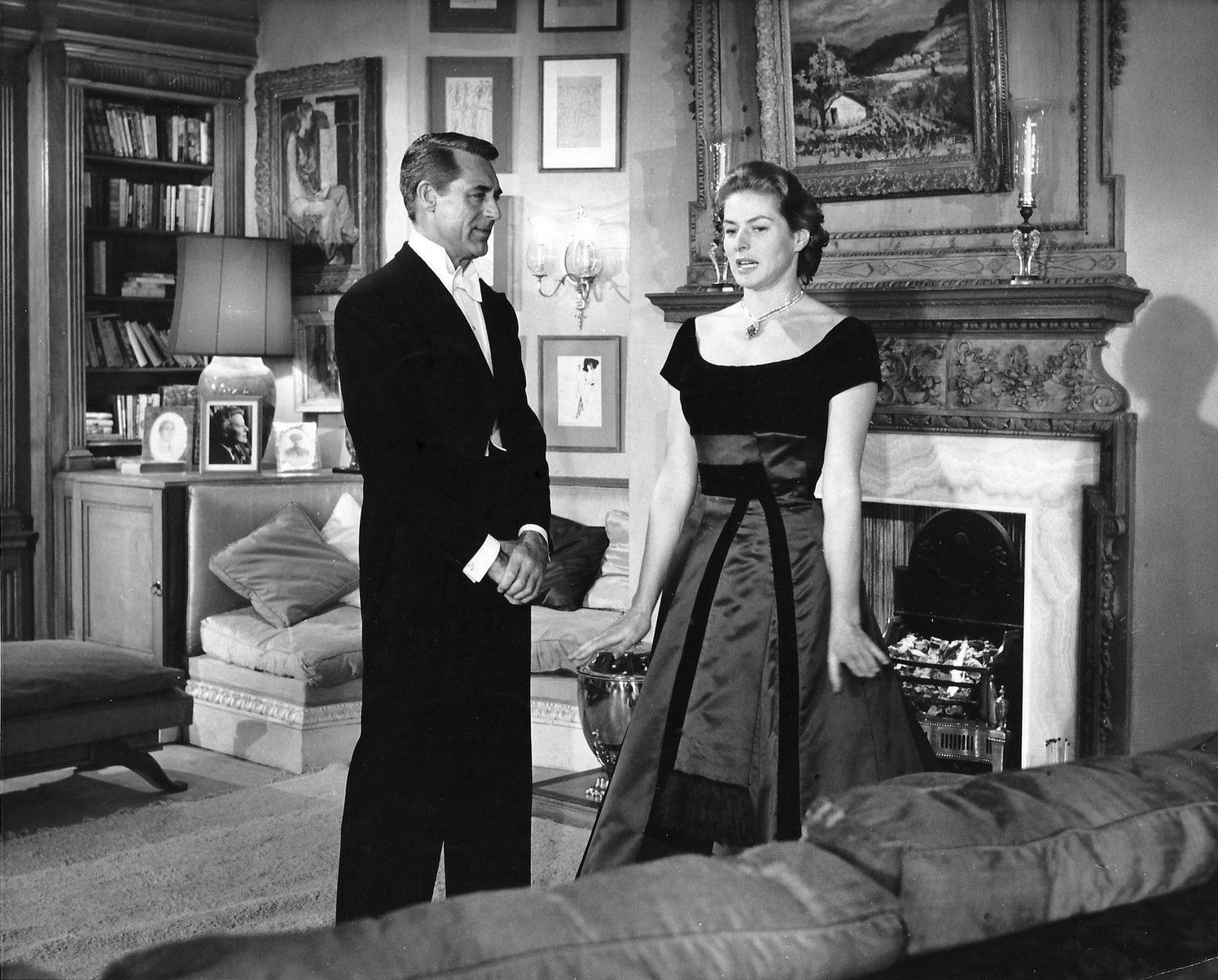
Ingrid Bergman in Dior in Indiscreet, 1958

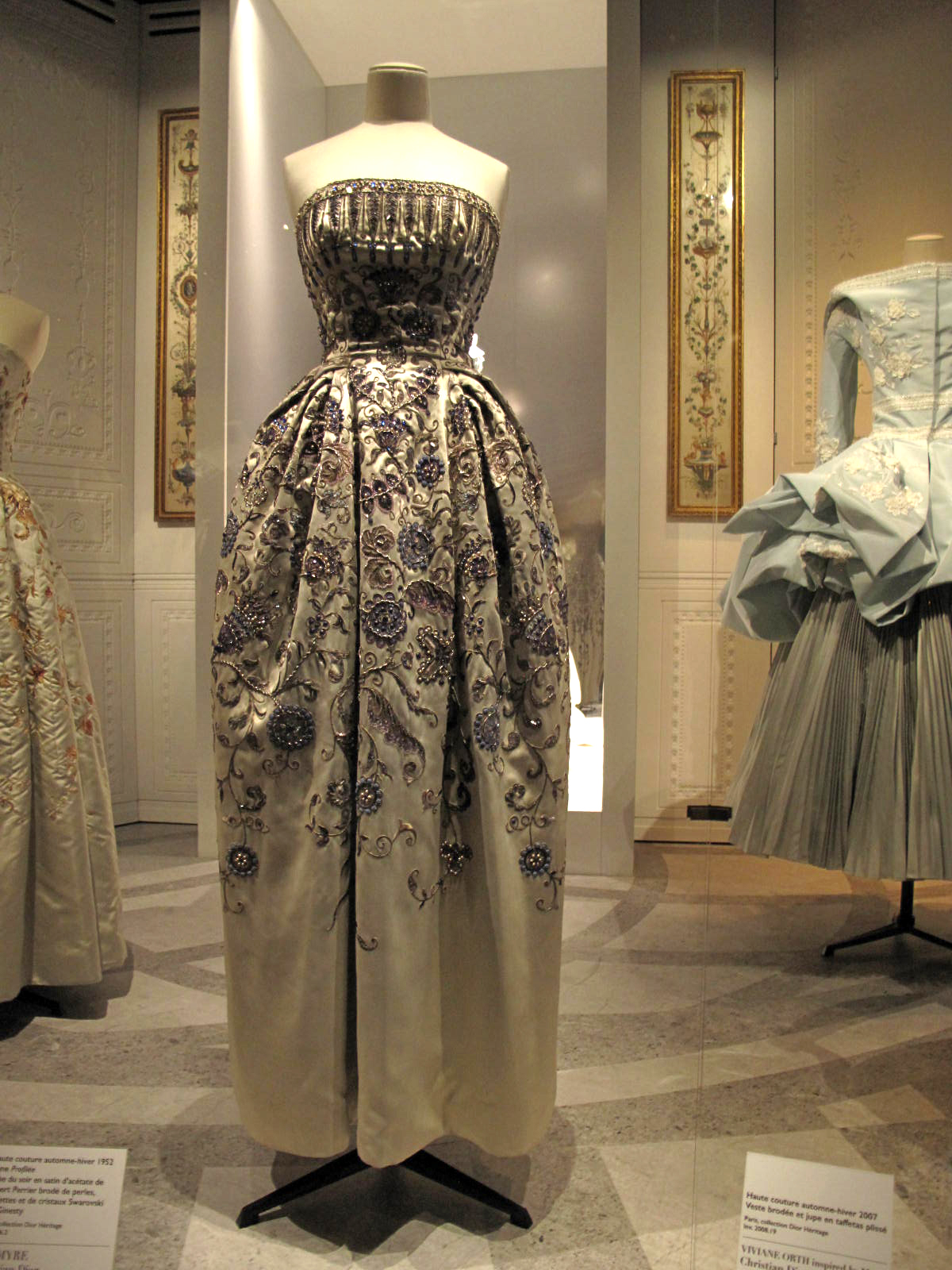
Gold Embroidered Silk Gown, undated

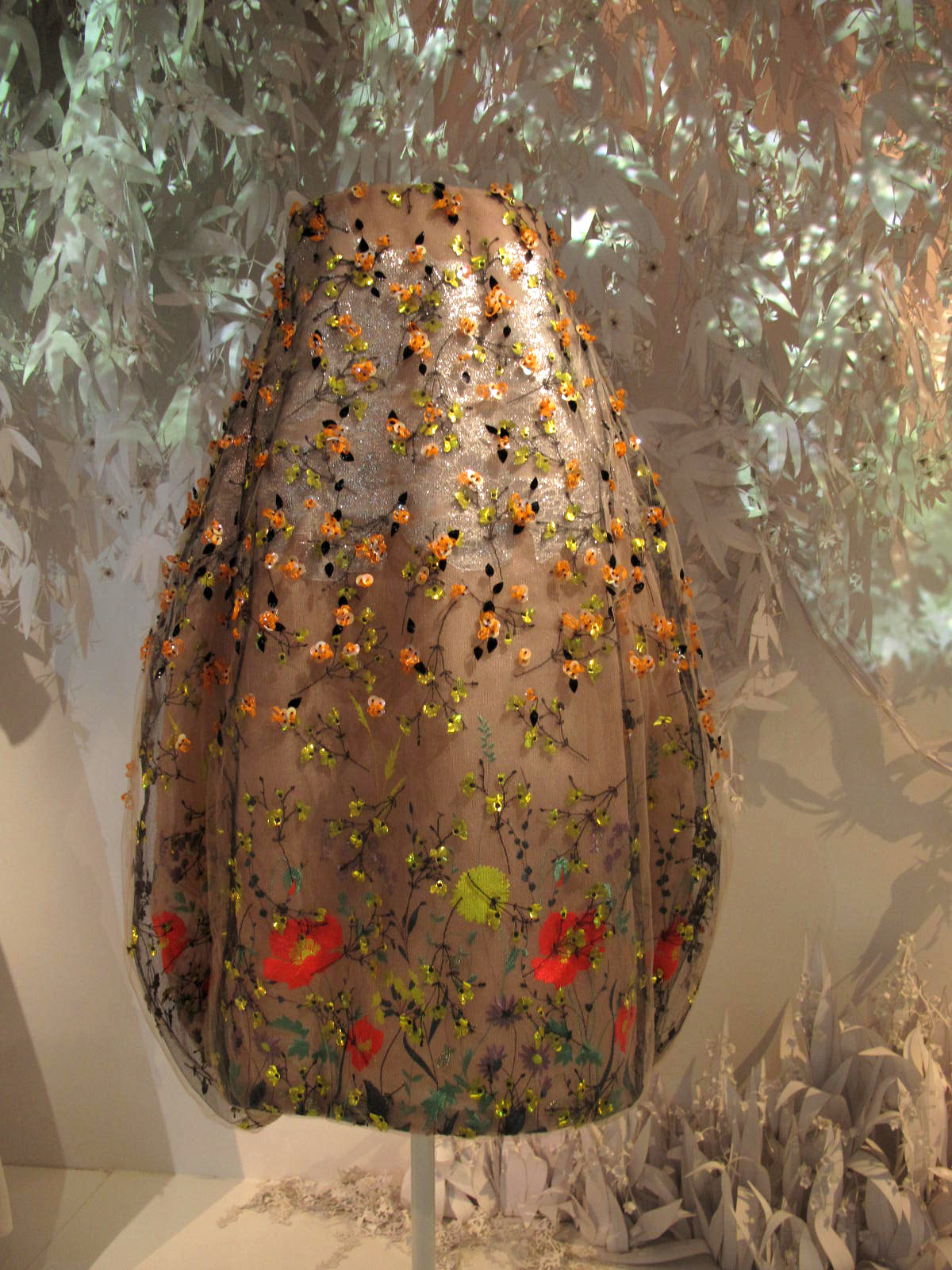
Embellished Evening Skirt, undated

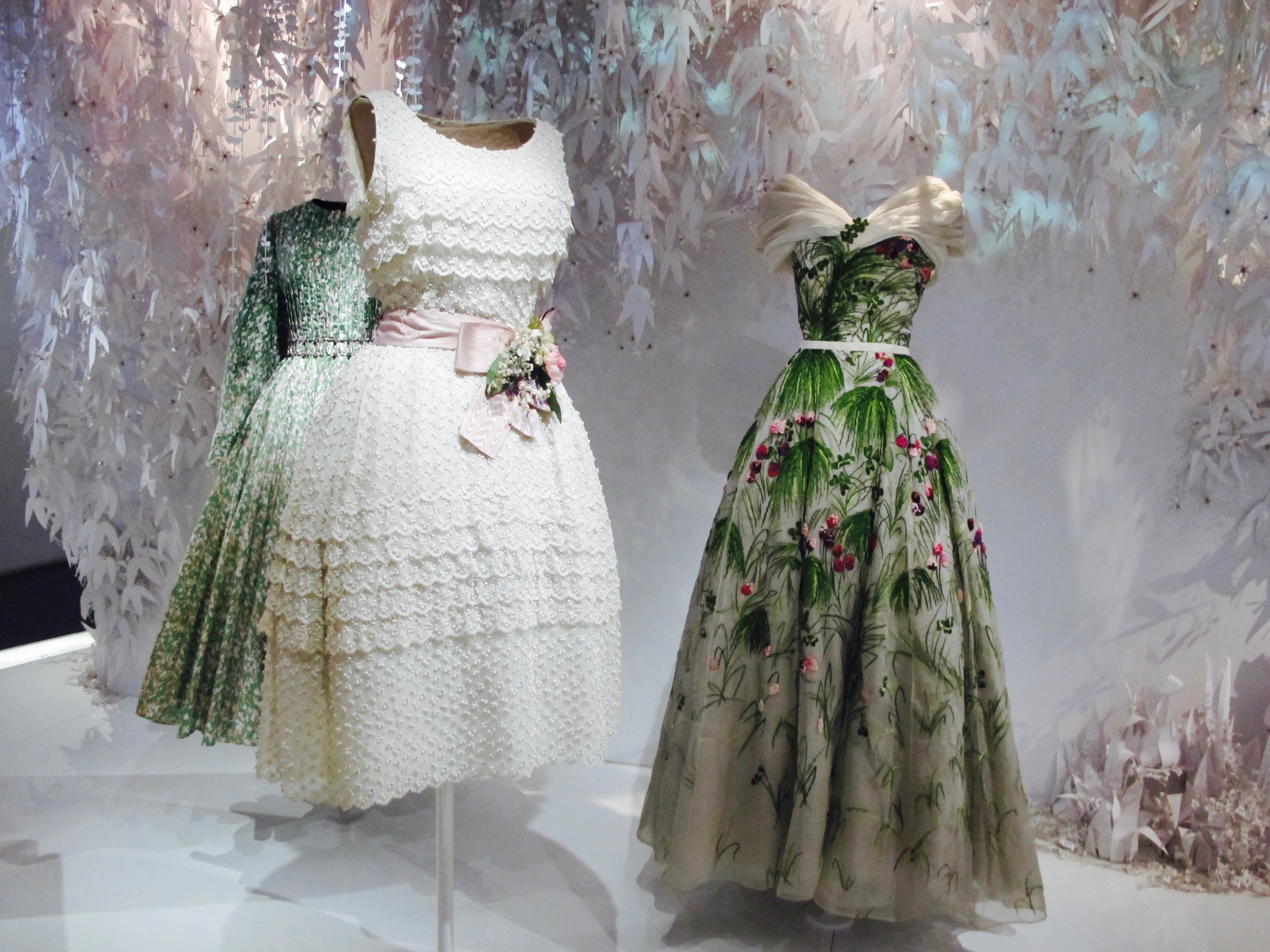
Three Dior Dresses

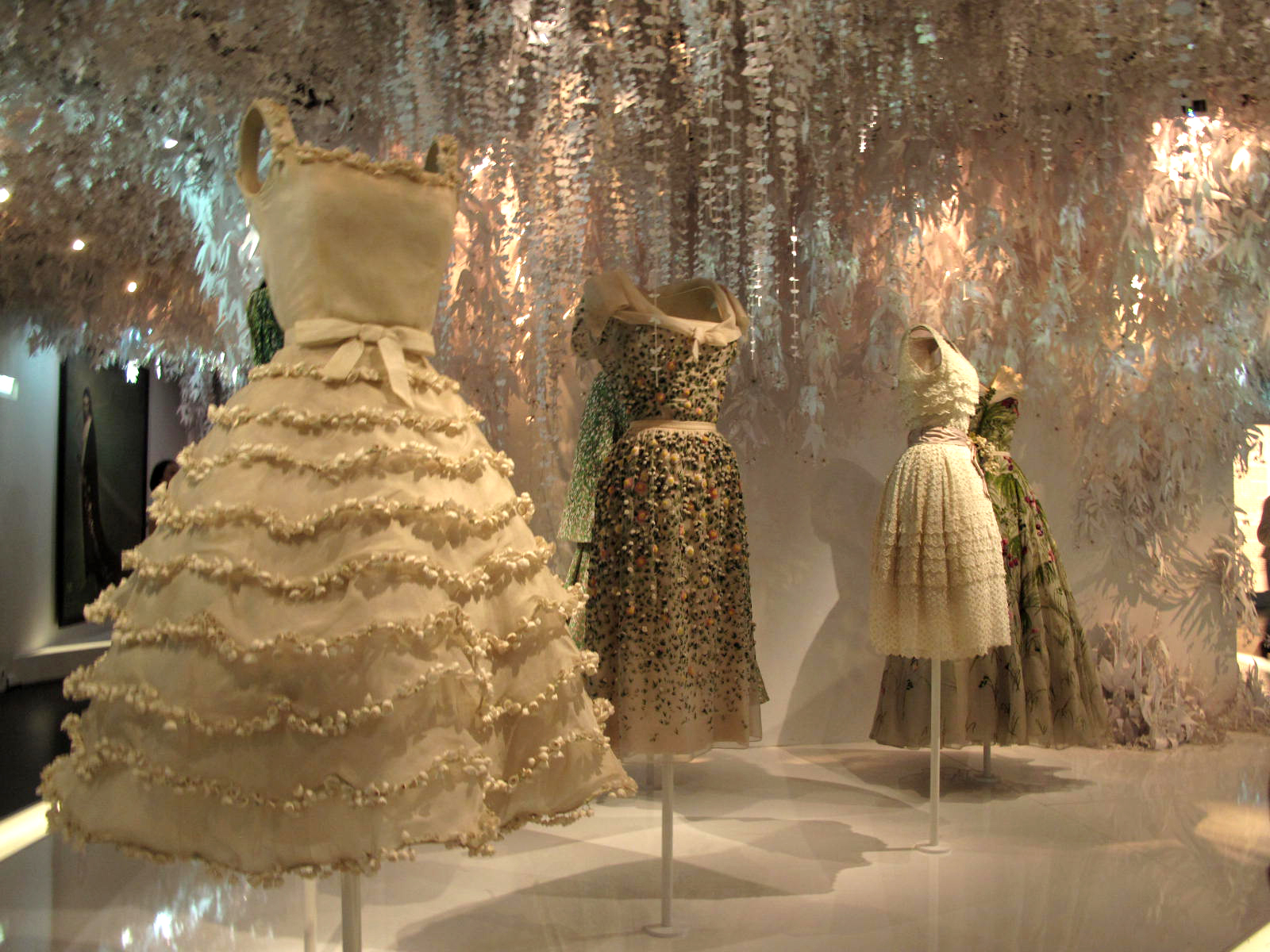
Three Dior Dresses

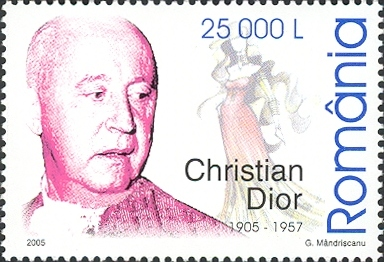
Dior on a Romanian Stamp, Cultural Anniversaries Series, 2005

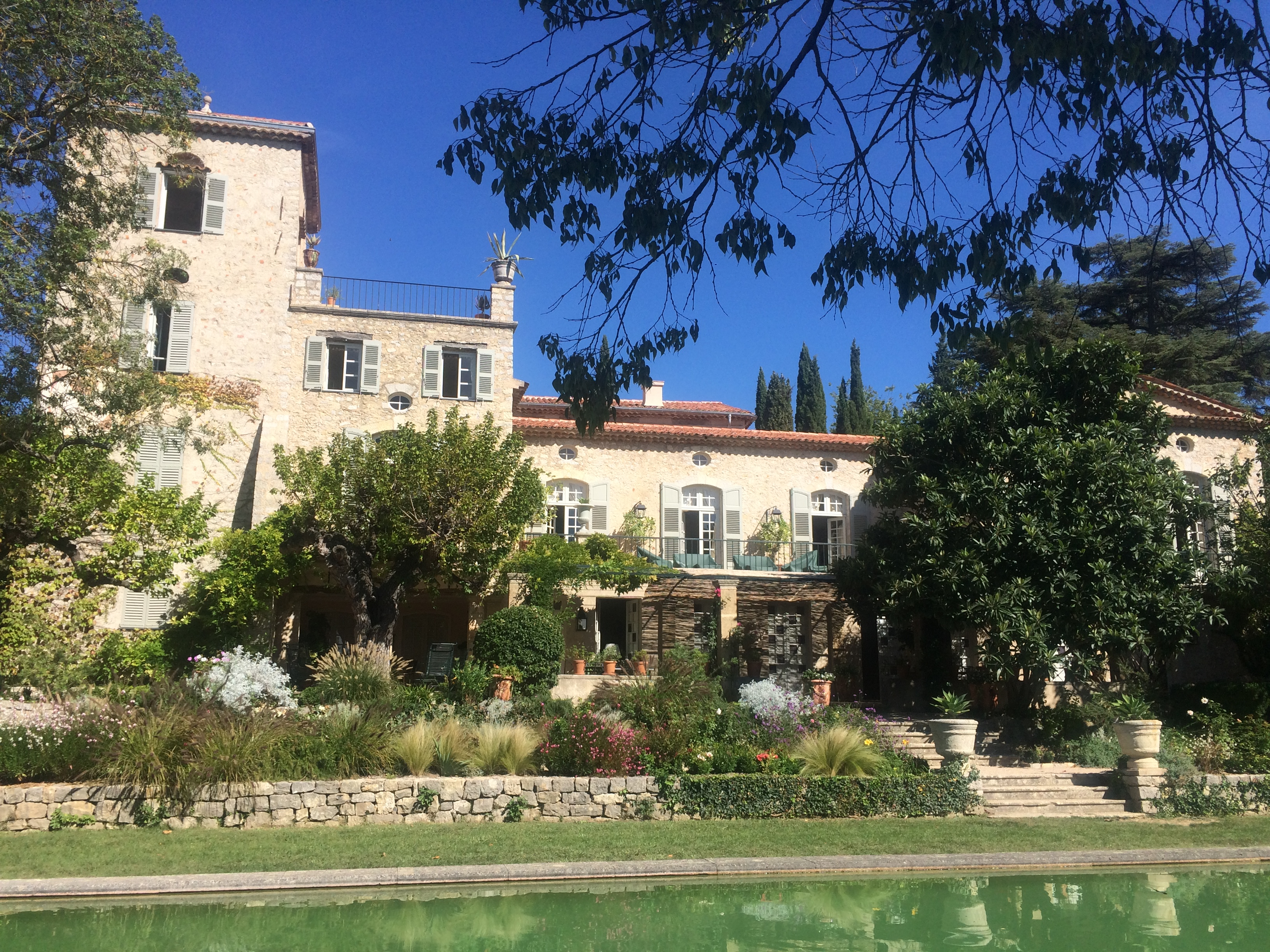
Château de La Colle Noire

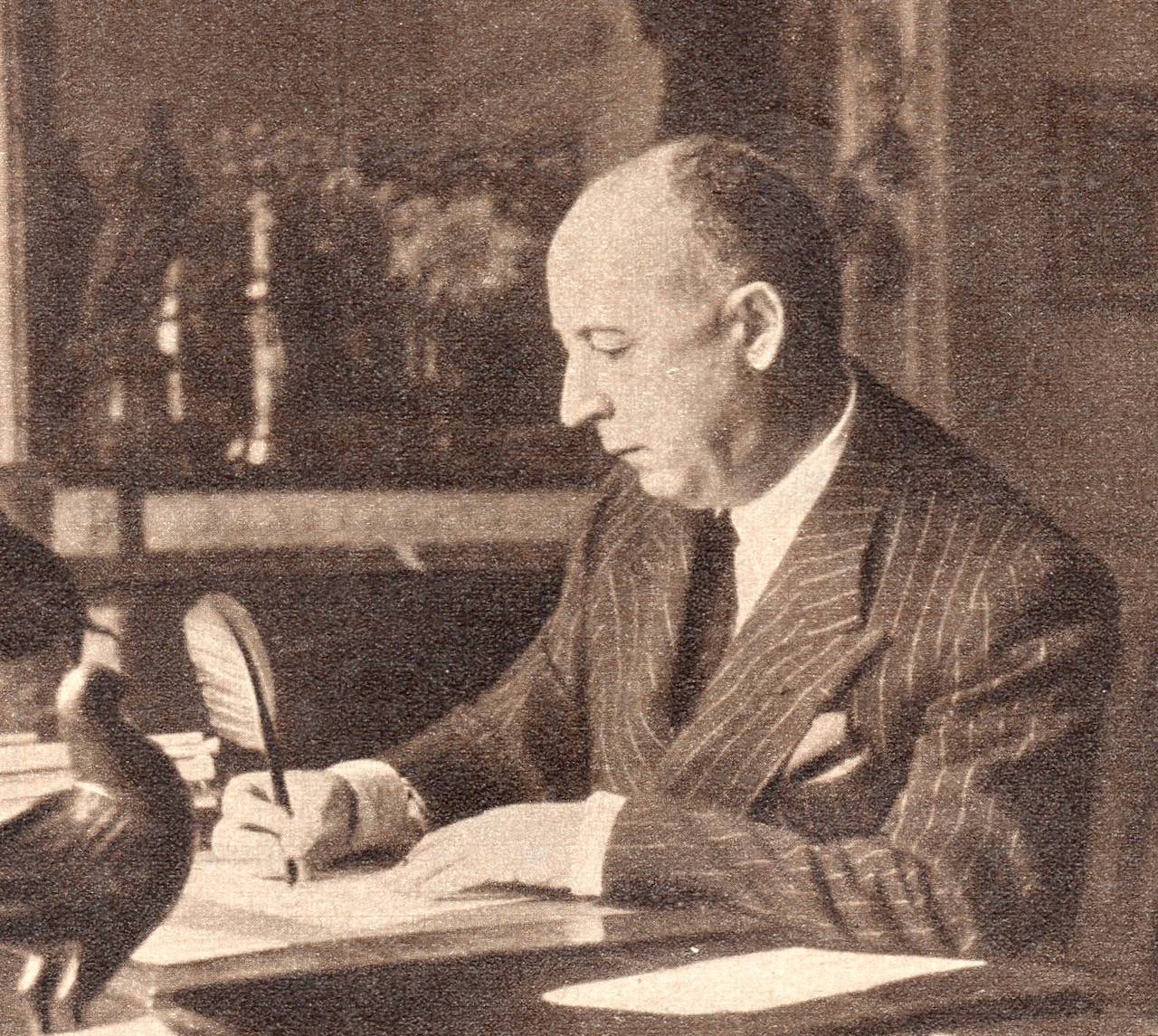
Dior in 1954
