= Sauvage (fragrance) =

Men's fragrance line by Dior

Fragrance by Christian Dior
- Designed for: Men
- Released: 2015
- Label: Parfums Christian Dior
- Perfumer(s): François Demachy
- Concentration: Eau de toilette
- Flanker(s): Eau de Parfum (2018); Parfum (2019); Elixir (2021)

Sauvage is a line of men's fragrances produced by Parfums Christian Dior. The original eau de toilette, composed by the house's in-house perfumer François Demachy, was released in 2015, with the actor Johnny Depp as the face of its advertising. It shares part of its name with Eau Sauvage, Dior's first men's scent from 1966, but is a separate product.

Since 2021 Sauvage has been the best-selling fragrance in the world across both men's and women's scents, and it has won three Fragrance Foundation Awards. A 2019 campaign built around Native American imagery was withdrawn after widespread criticism.

== Line ==
Sauvage was launched in 2015 as an eau de toilette developed by François Demachy. The line was extended with an eau de parfum in 2018, a parfum concentration in 2019, and Sauvage Elixir in 2021. An alcohol-free version, Eau Forte, was later composed by Francis Kurkdjian, and the name has also been used for a men's skincare range.

== Advertising ==
Depp has fronted the fragrance since its launch, in a series of films directed by Jean-Baptiste Mondino. Early campaigns showed him leaving town and, later, among wolves; a 2025 film placed him in a desert alongside a puma. Véronique Courtois, chief executive of Parfums Christian Dior, has said the scent "encapsulated something bigger" by presenting a view of masculinity free of stereotypes.

=== 2019 campaign ===
In late August 2019, ahead of a film scheduled for release on 1 September, Dior previewed a campaign titled "We Are the Land", directed by Mondino and starring Depp. The brand described it as "an authentic journey deep into the Native American soul in a sacred, founding and secular territory". The teaser drew immediate criticism on social media, and Dior removed the video and an accompanying Instagram post within hours.

Melissa Mollen-Dupuis, a co-founder of Idle No More in Quebec, objected to the word sauvage itself, saying it had been used "to say we were dirty, uncivilized, that we had no culture"; the designer Lesley Hampton called the campaign "a slap on the face to us", and the writer Adrienne Keene placed it within a longer pattern of appropriation by both Depp and Dior. Rather than issue its own statement, Dior circulated a release from Americans for Indian Opportunity, which said it had worked with the brand, the director and Depp on the "authentic inclusion of Native American images" and noted that it had made Depp an honorary Comanche citizen in 2012.

Depp later defended the project, saying the film "was made with a great respect for the indigenous people not just of North America but all over the world" and that the finished work had never been shown.

== Commercial performance ==
Sauvage became the best-selling men's fragrance worldwide in 2018 and, from 2021, the best-selling fragrance overall. Dior has reported that a bottle is sold roughly every 30 seconds, amounting to more than 12 million bottles a year, and that the scent ranks first in about 40 countries.

== Awards ==
Year	Award	Category	Work	Result	Ref.
2016	Fragrance Foundation Awards	Fragrance of the Year – Men's Prestige	Sauvage Eau de Toilette	Won	
2019	Fragrance Foundation Awards	Fragrance of the Year – Men's Prestige	Sauvage Eau de Parfum	Won	
2020	Fragrance Foundation Awards	Fragrance of the Year – Men's Prestige	Sauvage Parfum	Won	

== See also ==
- Eau Sauvage
- Parfums Christian Dior
