= Nicolas de Barry =

French perfumer

Nicolas de Barry is a French perfumer.

Born in 1948 (Paris, France), Nicolas de Barry studied both sociology and politics (PhD Sorbonne University, Paris). Before focusing on perfumery, he published books in French under the name Nicolas Martin : La Prusse rouge (Presses de la Cité, 1973), La Méditerranée (Éditions L'Appel, 1974), Senghor et le monde (Éditions ABC, 1979), La forteresse albanaise (Éditions Fayolle, 1979), as well as "La France fortifiée" (Editions Nathan) and "L'armée parle" (Éditions Fayard). The first time he signed with the name De Barry was when he created a choreography for a play of the French artist Dominique Tron : D'épuisement en épuisement jusqu'à l'aurore, Elisabeth. Nicolas Martin de Barry was awarded a "Prix d'Histoire de l'Académie Française" before starting the perfumery in 1992.

His encounters with Edmond Roudnitska (Diorissimo and Eau Sauvage), Françoise Marin, the director of Givaudan-Roure Perfumery School in Grasse, and Rodrique Romani, sparked his commitment to perfumery.

In Brazil, he became the perfumer of the "high society" for whom he made exclusive fragrances. In France he bought the Château de Frileuse near Blois in the Loire Valley where he set up a perfume Atelier and a garden of scents. De Barry also organizes workshops and Master Classes worldwide.

He is the author of several books on perfumery and cosmetics: « L'ABCdaire du parfum » ("The ABCs of perfumes"), Flammarion, with G. Vindry and M. Turonnet (translated in Portuguese and Italian); « Des parfums à faire soi-même » ("Make your own perfumes"), Minerva (translated in Portuguese); « L'Inde des parfums » (" India, country of fragrances "), Garde-Temps. « L’ABCdaire de l’huile d’olive » (« The little book of olive oil »), Flammarion.

He has visited professors at Montpellier University (France) and also the general secretary of the 'Prix International du Parfum' since 2000. He has been awarded a "Chevalier des Arts et Lettres" by the French Minister of Culture, Frédéric Mitterrand.
