= Society Awards =

American producer of entertainment awards

- Industry: Custom design and manufacture
- Founded: 2007
- Founder: David Moritz
- Headquarters: 2000 South Blvd. #620, Charlotte, North Carolina, U.S.
- Products: Sculpture, awards, executive gifts, trophy
- Website: societyawards.com

Society Awards is an American company best known for designing and manufacturing high-profile entertainment industry awards.

== History ==
Society Awards was founded in 2007 by entrepreneur David Moritz, and is headquartered in Charlotte, North Carolina. An attorney by training, Moritz is a serial entrepreneur who launched Viceroy Creative, a full service luxury brand agency, he co-owned with his first Wife Gabrielle Rein, who served as Creative Director.

== Clients ==
Society Awards clients include televised entertainment programs, charitable organizations, Fortune 500 corporations, film festivals, and luxury brands. The company has done projects for companies and brands ranging from MTV to YouTube, John Varvatos, and Jeff Koons.

Society Awards is responsible for the design and manufacturing of the statuettes for numerous entertainment industry awards, including the Emmy Award, Golden Globe Award GLAAD Media Award, Academy of Country Music Award, American Music Award, YouTube Creator Awards, BET Awards, Billboard Music Award, Council of Fashion Designers of America Award, MTV Movie Award, MTV Video Music Award, Dancing with the Stars trophy, and the MARCOM AWARDS (The Annual Award for Marketing and Communication Professionals), among others.

In 2013, Society Awards designed the first ever trophy for The Voice. That same year, the company also manufactured a bottle stopper as part of limited edition packaging for Patrón in its collaboration with David Yurman.

Society Awards is the designer and manufacturer of the YouTube Creator Awards.

In 2019, Society Awards created the YouTube Red Diamond Creator Award with Baccarat red crystal. It is on display at the Musée Baccarat in Paris, France.

== Location ==
The company does much of the trophy and award customizing in a 40,000 square foot production facility in Grove, OK from land the city of Grove granted to Society Awards as an inducement to locate in their community and kick start the industrial park.

In 2020, Society Awards opened their main headquarters in Charlotte, North Carolina in the city's South End. Moritz’s says it is “the best building in Charlotte”
