= Parfums Christian Dior =

French perfume and cosmetics line

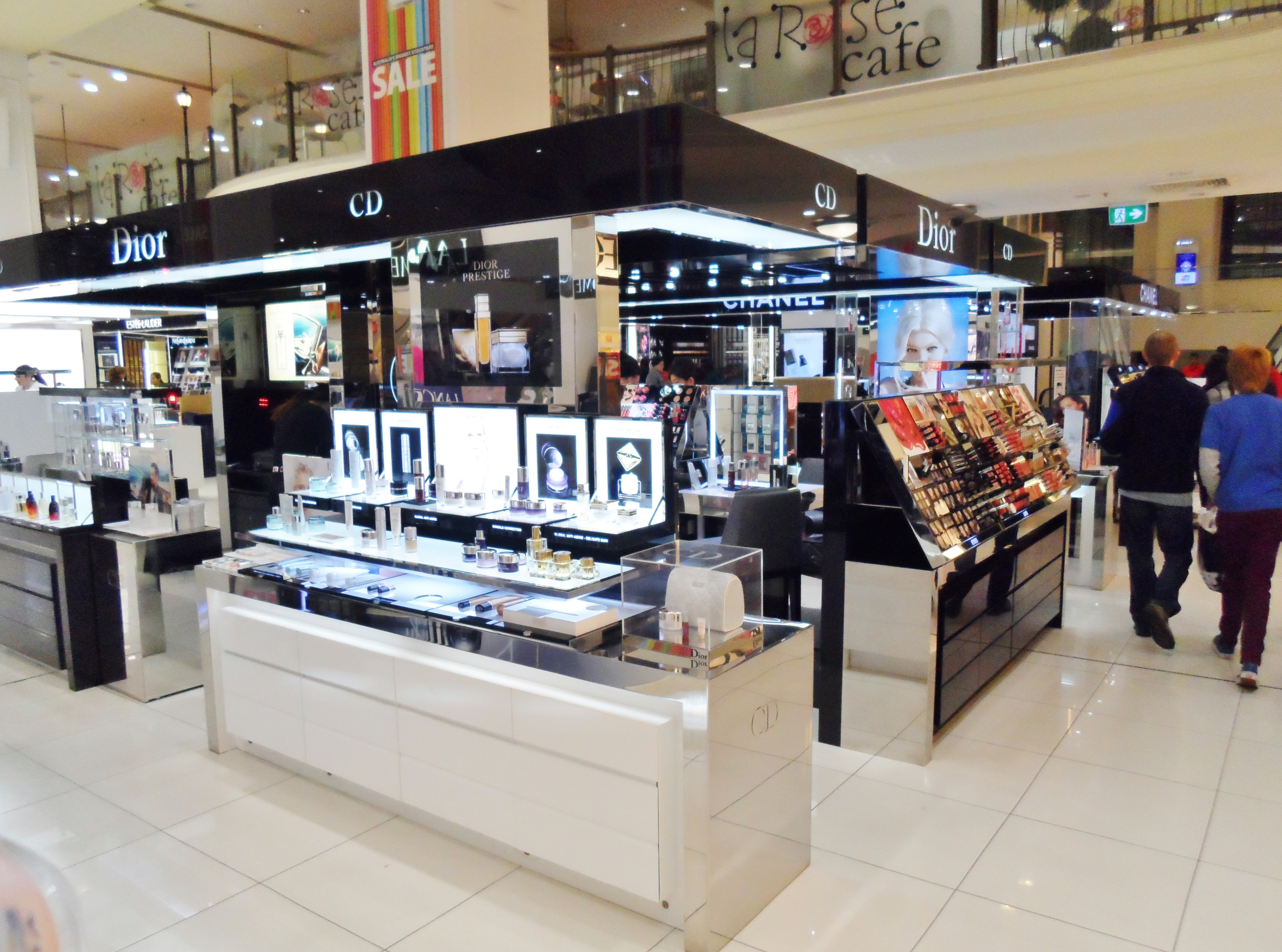
Large cosmetics counter at Australian department store MYER in Sydney

Parfums Christian Dior is the perfumery and cosmetics (makeup and skincare) line of the French fashion house, Christian Dior SE. Parfums Christian Dior was acquired and later became part of LVMH, the world's largest luxury products group. Bernard Arnault leads LVMH and the company took full control of Christian Dior SE in 2017, uniting the fashion and beauty businesses of the Christian Dior brand. Fragrance brands by the company include Miss Dior, J'adore, Poison, Eau Sauvage and Sauvage.

== History ==
In 1947 the company launched Miss Dior, after Christian Dior appointed his friend, Serge Heftler Louiche, as director. At Château de la Colle Noire, Christian Dior's home, flowers including Lily of the Valley were cultivated, whilst his sister Catherine was a flower farmer, who provided Rose and Jasmine for fragrances.

Edmond Roudnitska was appointed and created the fragrance Diorama in 1949, the company then expanded into make-up, creating lipsticks for private clients before offering these to a wider audience in the early 1950's, and in 1956 the Diorissimo perfume was launched, formulated using Lily of the Valley. Christian Dior was known to sew a sprig of this flower into the hems of haute couture dresses he produced. Eau Sauvage was launched as Christian Dior's first fragrance for men in 1966. A year later, Serge Lutens created a cosmetics range.

In 1968, Moët et Chandon began to acquire Parfums Christian Dior, and in 1971 Moët et Chandon merged with Hennessy to create Moët Hennessy. The fragrance Diorella was created in 1972, and Poison was launched in 1985. In 1987 Moët Hennessy merged with Louis Vuitton, so Parfums Christian Dior became part of the LVMH group. J'adore was launched in 1999 and was created by perfumer Calice Becker, with the bottle designed by Hervé Van der Staeten.

Makeup artist Peter Philips was appointed as creative and image director of makeup for Christian Dior, in 2014. In October 2021, Dior appointed Francis Kurkdjian as its new creative director of perfume. Véronique Courtois became CEO and Chairman in 2023. In 2026, Olivier Teboul became President of the company, in North America.

== Makeup ==
Makeup offerings fall into the following categories:

- Face: Foundations, concealers, powders, blush, and sun makeup
- Eyes: Mascara, eyeshadow, liners, eyebrows
- Lips: Lipstick, gloss, lipliners, lip balm
- Nails: Nail lacquers and manicure
- Accessories: Brushes

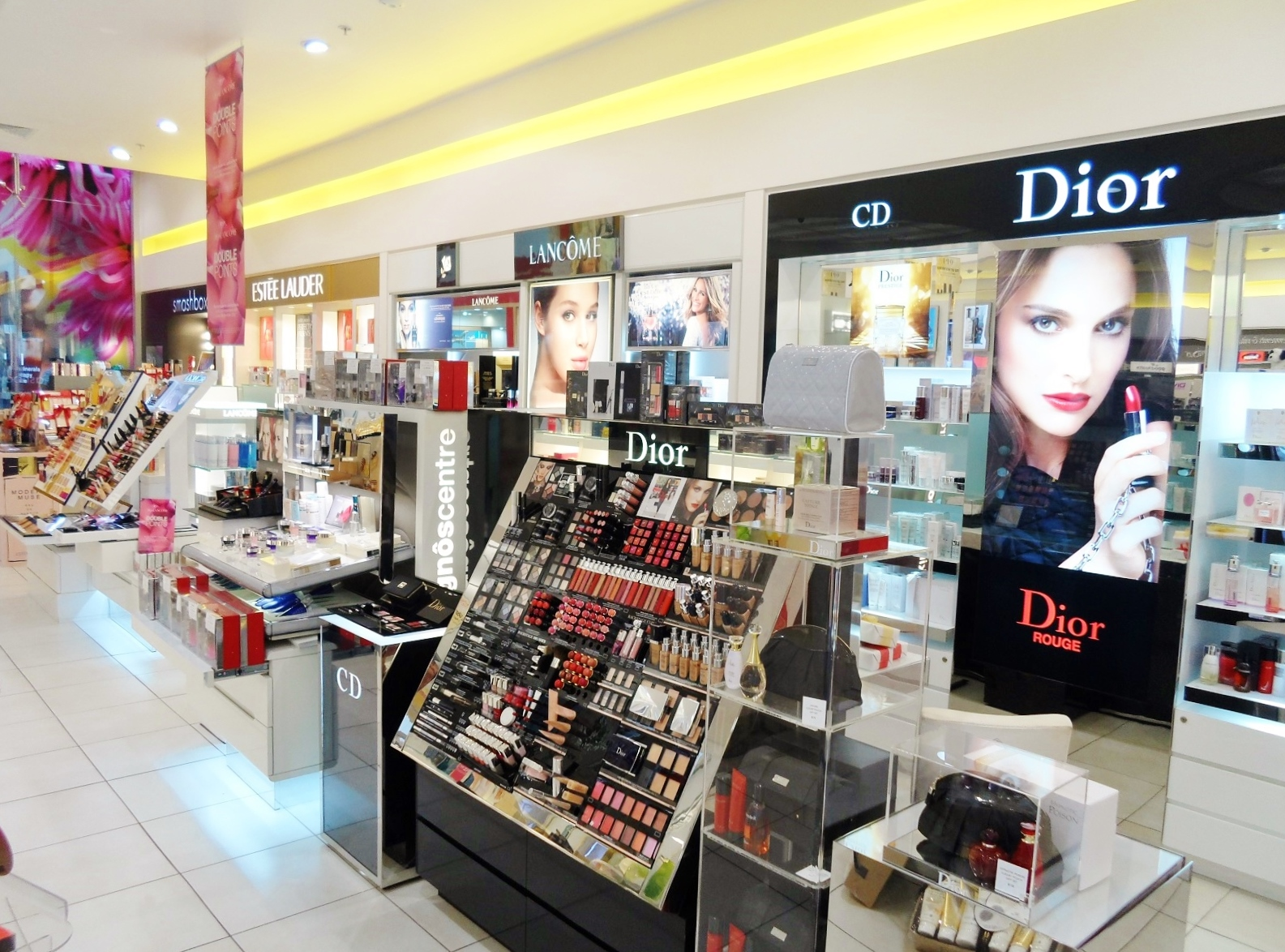
Dior and other prestige cosmetics at Life Pharmacy at Westfield Albany on the North Shore of Auckland, New Zealand

Products include:

- Dior Addict (lip makeup)
- Diorskin (face makeup)
- Rouge Dior and Rouge Dior On Stage (lip makeup)
- Dior Backstage
- Diorshow (mascara)

Dior makeup is used to prepare models backstage for Dior fashion shows.

== Skincare ==
Skincare offerings fall into the following categories:

- Face skincare: Hydration and protection; premium anti-aging skincare; global anti-aging skincare; wrinkle correction; firmness correction; cleansers, toners, and masks
- Body care: Hydration and refining
- Eye care: Specialist eye treatment
- Suncare: Self-tanners, sun protection, after-sun
- Men skincare: Shaving, relaxing; repairing, nourishing

Products include:

- Dior Homme (men's skincare)
- Dior Bronze (suncare)
- Hydra Life (hydration)
- Diorsnow (whitening skincare)
- Capture XP (anti-wrinkle skincare, wrinkle correction, discontinued)
- Capture Youth
- Capture V (sold in Asia)
- Capture Totale (global anti-aging)
- One Essential (detoxification)
- Dior Prestige (extraordinary, regeneration, perfection & anti-aging skincare)
- Dior Prestige White (extraordinary, regeneration, perfection, whitening & anti-aging skincare)
- L'or de Vie (skincare masterpiece, anti-aging)

== Head office location ==
The company was headquartered at 33 Avenue Hoche in the 8th arrondissement of Paris, France. The headquarters later moved to Neuilly-sur-Seine in a newer building called Kosmo.

== See also ==
- RoC Skincare, former subsidiary
