= François Demachy =

French perfumer

François Demachy is a French perfumer. He trained at Charabot. He was succeeded as Dior's House Perfumer by Francis Kurkdjian, but he remained a perfumer under the LVMH umbrella brands.

== Biography ==
Born in Cannes, Demachy lived the majority of his life in the town of Grasse, where his father ran a pharmacy. He studied dentistry, physiotherapy, then after working at Mane, studied at the school of perfumery company Charabot.

After five years of study at Charabot, Demachy joined Chanel, where he was appointed Director of Research and Development, collaborating simultaneously with the creation of perfumes of Chanel, Ungaro, Bourjois and Tiffany. In 2006, he was appointed Christian Dior's main nose and Director of Development for the cosmetics and perfumes division of LVMH. He also collaborated in the production of Fendi and Acqua di Parma perfumes, also by the LVMH group.

In 2009, Dior released a flanker to its pillar fragrance Miss Dior Chérie, called Miss Dior Chérie L’Eau, signed by Demachy. British Vogue described this perfume as a “sparkling and distinctive floral scent blended with notes of tangy yet spicy bitter orange, Gardenia and white musks”.

In 2011, Demachy oversaw significant revisions of fragrances Miss Dior and Miss Dior Chérie (eau de parfum). Miss Dior was reimagined by Demachy and this fragrance was renamed Miss Dior Original. Miss Dior Chérie became simply Miss Dior and though it retained similar packaging, the fragrance was significantly altered, also by Demachy although with less fanfare, and since then has born little resemblance to Christine Nagel’s original creation by the same name. These changes were part of Dior owner LVMH's efforts to gain greater control over their perfume formulations. Prior to bringing on Demachy to create its perfumes in house, Dior has contracted out its fragrances and consequently Givaudan held the formula for Nagel's creation. Demachy's adjustments allowed Dior to take over Miss Dior Chérie without violating Givaudan’s copyright.

== Creations ==
=== Dior ===
- Aqua Fahrenheit (2011)
- Eau Sauvage Cologne (2015)
  - Eau Sauvage Extrême (2010)
  - Eau Sauvage Fraîcheur Cuir (2007)
  - Eau Sauvage Parfum (2012)
- Escale to Portofino (2008)
- Dior Oud Ispahan (2012)
- Dior Homme (2011)
- Dior Homme (2020)
- Dior Homme Cologne (2007)
- Dior Homme Cologne (2013)
- Dior Homme Eau For Men (2014)
- Dior Homme Parfum (2014)
- Dior Homme Sport (2008)
- Dior Homme Sport (2012)
- Dior Homme Sport (2017)
- Dior Homme Sport (2021)
- Fahrenheit 32 (2007)
- Fahrenheit Absolute (2009)
- Fahrenheit Cologne (2015)
- Hypnotic Poison (2000)
- Midnight Poison (2007)
- Miss Dior Chérie (2008)
- Miss Dior Couture Edition (2011)
- Miss Dior EDP (2017)
- Miss Dior Eau Fraiche (2012)
- Sauvage (2015)
- Fève délicieuse (2018)
- Dior La Colle Noire (2018)
- Sauvage Elixir (2021)
- Tobacolor (2021)
- Vanilla Diorama (2021)

=== Emilio Pucci ===
- Miss Pucci (2010)
- Vivara (2007)
- Vivara Silver Edition (2008)

=== Tiffany ===
- Tiffany (1987)
