= Que sais-je? =

French book series

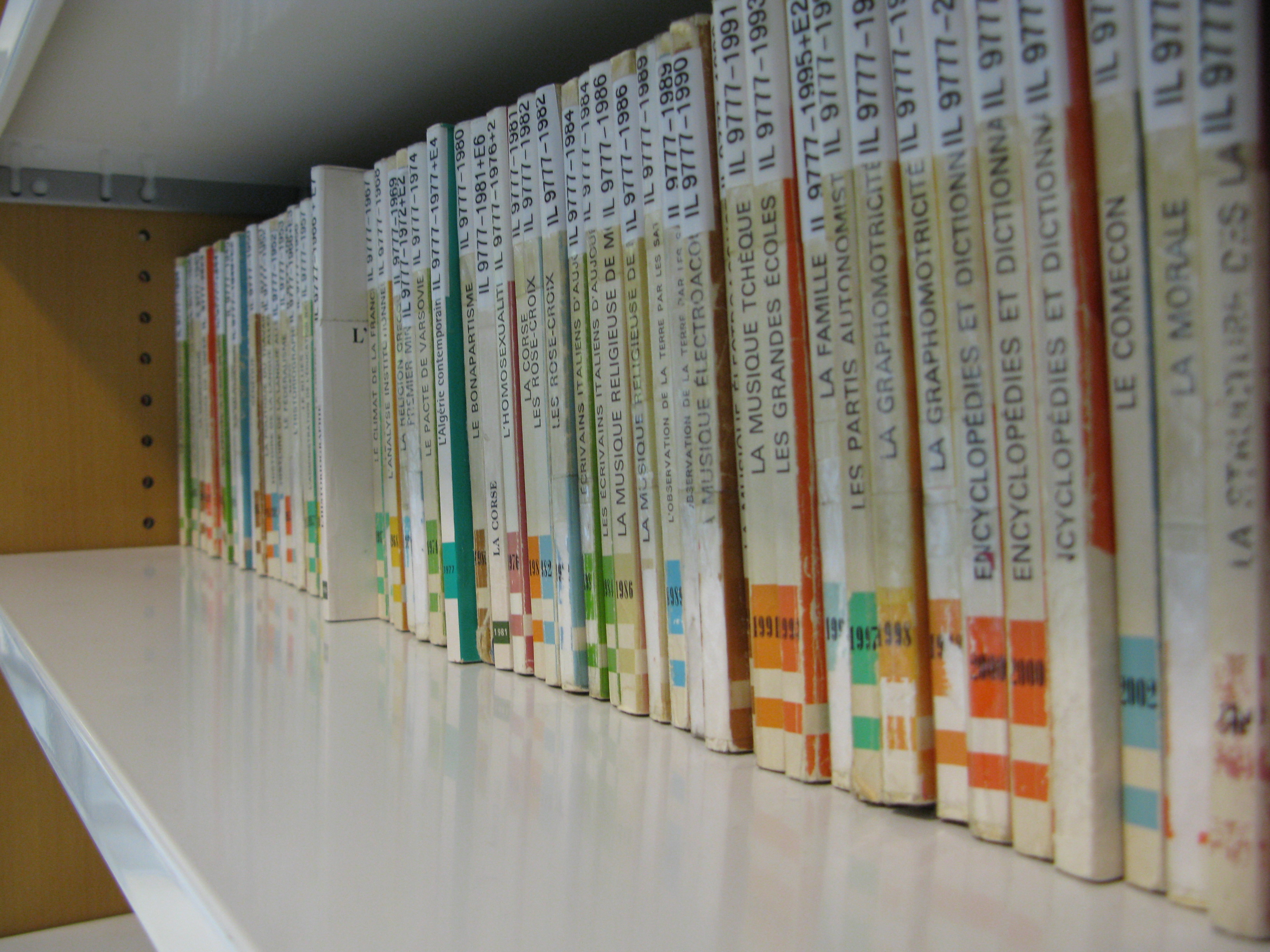
Some titles from the collection

Que sais-je? (French: [kə sɛʒ]; lit. '"What do I know?"', ISSN 0768-0066) is an editorial collection published by the Presses Universitaires de France. The aim of the series is to provide the lay reader with an accessible introduction to a field of study written by an expert in the field. The title is taken from the works of French essayist Michel de Montaigne.

Started in 1941 by Paul Angoulvent (1899–1976), founder of the Presses Universitaires de France, the series now numbers over 3,900 titles by more than 2,500 authors, and various volumes, taken all together, have been translated into more than 43 languages. Some titles have sold more than 300,000 copies (namely by Piaget). Each year, 50 to 60 new titles are added to the collection, which comprises ten different series. As such, it easily constitutes the world's largest running 'encyclopedia' in paperback format. The range of subjects is truly encyclopedic, covering everything from chanson de geste and Homer to gastronomy and free will. Not all subjects are academic—they may include current topics, such as violence in sports or personal coaching. The presentation of information is varied and may consist of an introduction to a subject, a detailed essay on a school of thought, or an analysis of current events. Up to 2004, more than 160 million copies had been sold worldwide.

The series is unusual in several ways: first, the price for each volume is the same and is kept to a minimum (€10 as of 2023), and each book has 128 pages.

When a title becomes out of date, it may either be withdrawn from the series or updated. Sometimes this updating involves a complete re-writing of the book, as for example Parfumerie (volume 1888): originally written by Edmond Roudnitska in 1980 and re-written by Jean-Claude Ellena in 2006, but keeping the same number within the series.

However, after having exhausted general topics, the series began to take an interest in more and more specialized subjects (for example The Laser in Dermatology and Aesthetics, Sperm, or Factoring), which caused the public to be estranged from the series and led to a drop in sales at the end of the century. Finally, the collection offloaded two-thirds of its catalog to concentrate on 700 titles.

The series is similar to other series such as Collection 128 published by Armand Colin in France, Découvertes Gallimard published by Éditions Gallimard, the Very Short Introductions published by Oxford University Press and C.H. Beck Wissen published by Verlag C.H. Beck.

== Evolution of cover design ==
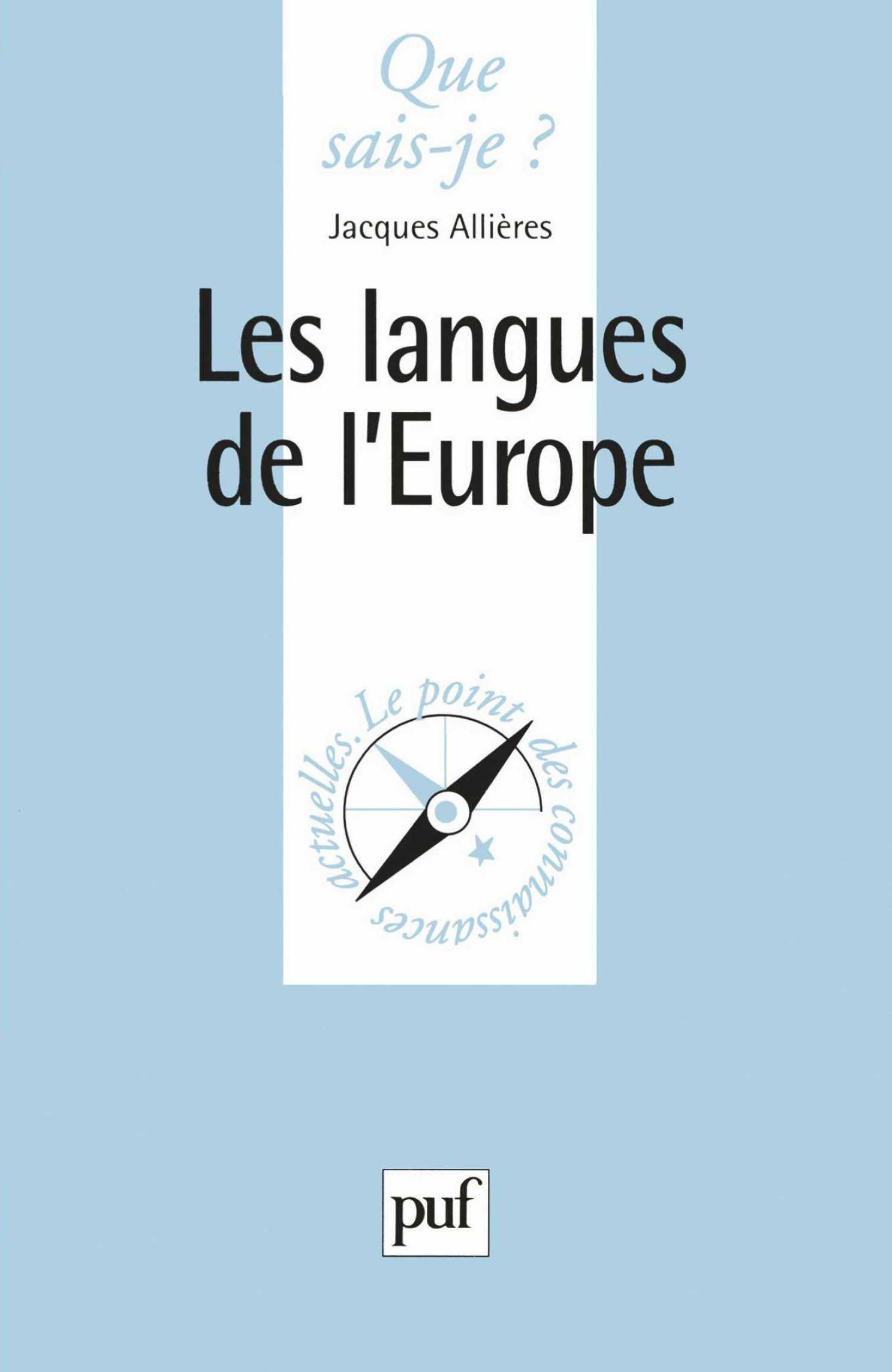
1980–2000

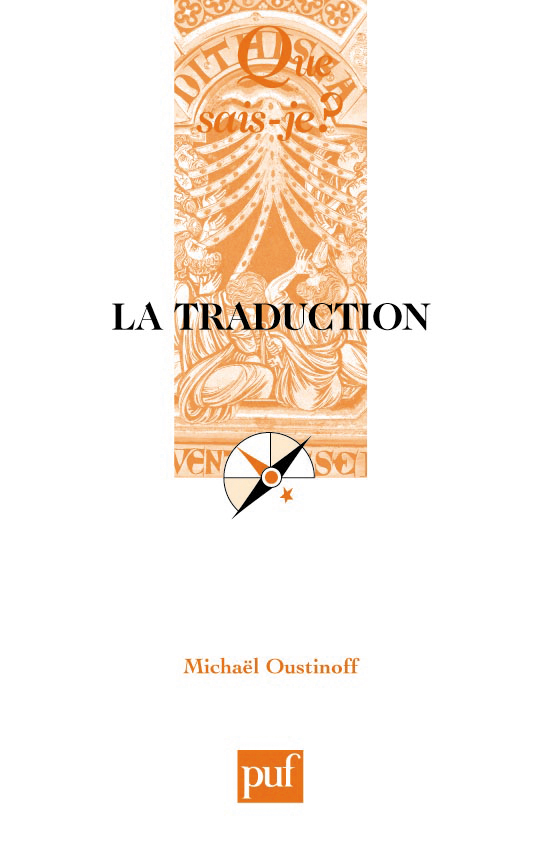
2000–2007

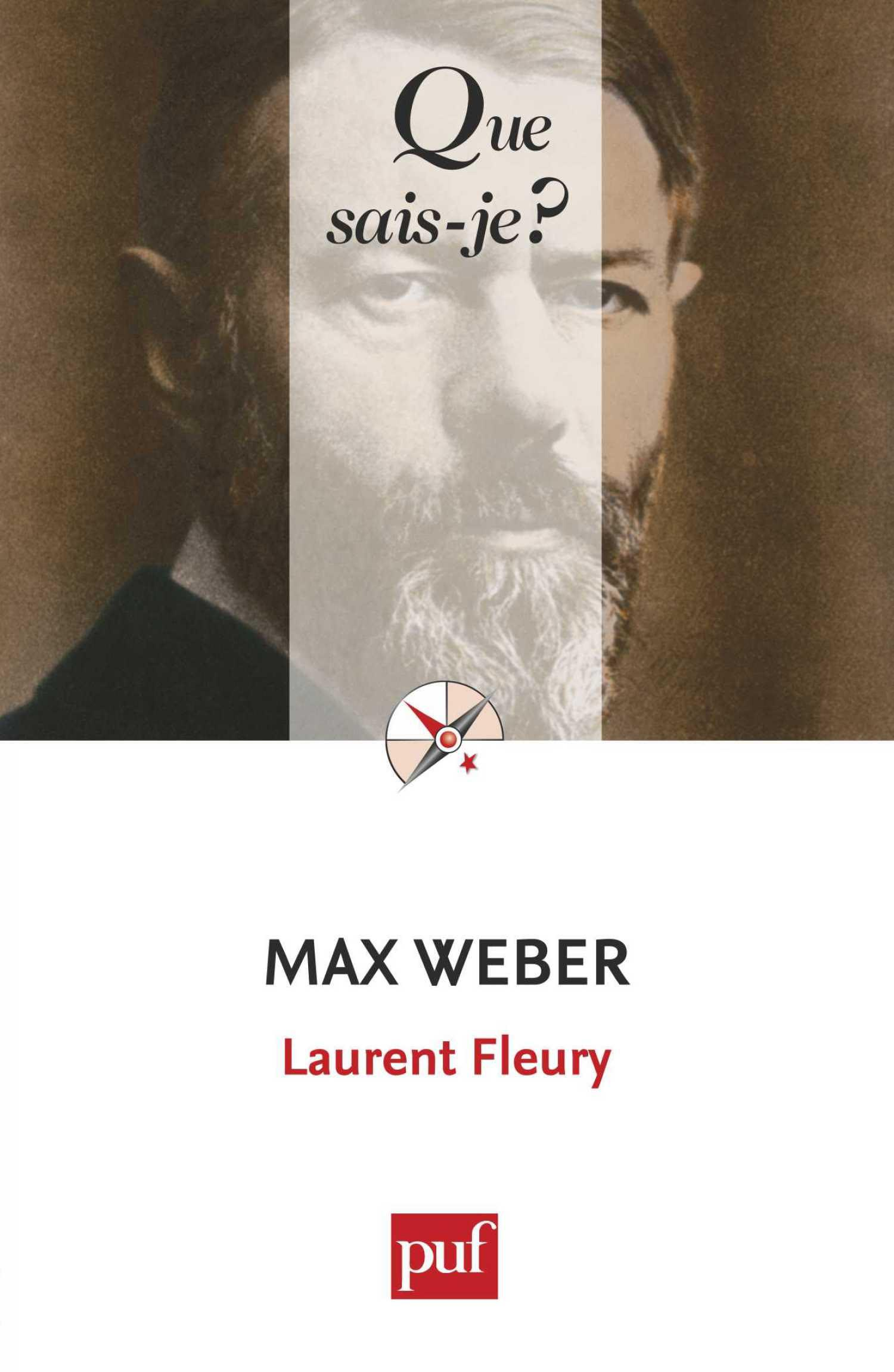
2007–2016

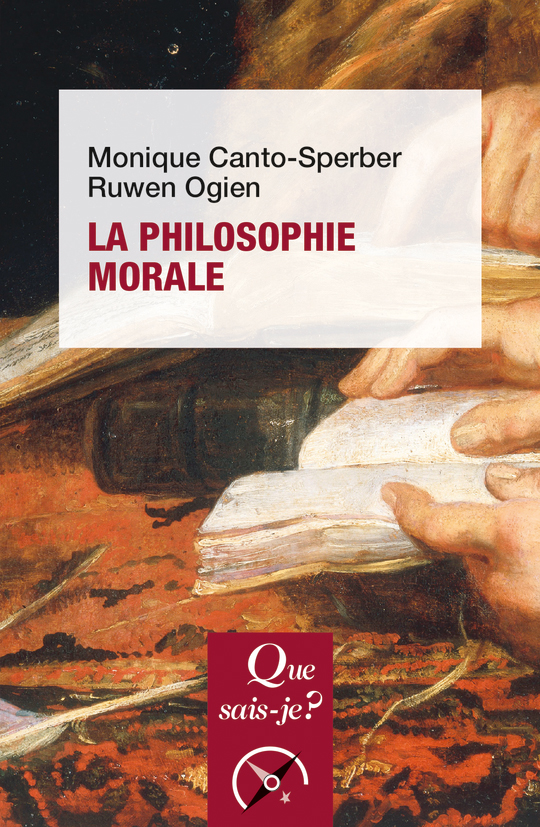
Since 2017
