= Methyl dihydrojasmonate =

Names
- Preferred IUPAC name Methyl 2-(3-oxo-2-pentylcyclopentyl)acetate
- Other names Hedione; Kharismal; Cepionate

Identifiers
CAS Number	24851-98-7
3D model (JSmol)	Interactive image
ChEBI	CHEBI:195265
ChEMBL	ChEMBL1530328
ChemSpider	92919
ECHA InfoCard	100.042.254
EC Number	246-495-9
PubChem CID	102861
UNII	3GW44CIE3Y
CompTox Dashboard (EPA)	DTXSID2029325
- InChI: InChI=1S/C13H22O3/c1-3-4-5-6-11-10(7-8-12(11)14)9-13(15)16-2/h10-11H,3-9H2,1-2H3 Key: KVWWIYGFBYDJQC-UHFFFAOYSA-N
- SMILES: O=C(OC)CC1C(C(=O)CC1)CCCCC

Properties
Chemical formula	C_{13}H_{22}O_{3}
Molar mass	226.316 g·mol^{−1}
Appearance	Clear to pale yellow oily liquid
Boiling point	307.8 °C (586.0 °F; 581.0 K)

Hazards
- Occupational safety and health (OHS/OSH)
Main hazards	Flammable
Flash point	113 °C (235 °F; 386 K)
- Except where otherwise noted, data are given for materials in their standard state (at 25 °C [77 °F], 100 kPa). verify (what is ?) Infobox references

Methyl dihydrojasmonate (often referred to by its trade names of hedione or kharismal) is an aroma compound with an odor similar to that of jasmine. It is a synthetic relative of methyl jasmonate, a naturally occurring compound in floral scents such as jasmine, tuberose and magnolia. In racemic mixtures the odor is floral and citrus, while epimerized mixtures exhibit a dense buttery-floral odor with odor recognition thresholds of 15 parts per billion. Considered one of the compounds responsible for the projection of the scent in living flowers, it was first fully characterised and synthesized between 1957 and 1962 in jasmine absolute (0.8%) by the fragrance chemist Edouard Demole, who was working at Firmenich. and is used in fine fragrances as well as cosmetics, toiletries, and detergents.

== Synthesis ==
Some of the earliest synthesis was based on the selective hydrogenation of methyl jasmonate, which was obtained from natural jasmine oil. However, as this made up <0.8% of the oil, better routes were soon developed. Modern synthesis involves the condensation of cyclopentanone and pentanal, followed by C=C bond isomerisation to give the 2-pentyl-cyclopentenone derivative. Michael reaction of this with dimethyl malonate, followed by decarboxylation gives the desired product.

== Use in perfumery ==
The first commercially successful fragrance to use hedione was Eau Sauvage, created by the perfumer Edmond Roudnitska for Christian Dior and launched in 1966. Adding hedione to a classically hesperidic fragrance construction created a dewy lemony magnolia-jasmine dimension without being directly floral. This is considered to be the beginning of a new trend in perfumery towards transparency and projection.

Odor perception of hedione in humans is very different compared to the vast majority of other odors, since it acts as a ligand for the vomeronasal type-1 receptor 1 (VN1R1), rather than an olfactory receptor.

== Etymology ==
The name hedione is derived from Ancient Greek hēdonḗ, "pleasure" (cf. hedonism). Kharismal is derived from the Greek kharisma, meaning "grace" or "favor" (cf. charisma).
