= Baccarat Rouge 540 =

Perfume

Fragrance by Maison Francis Kurkdjian
- Category: Woody
- Notes: Hedione, Ambroxan, Cedar, Saffron
- Released: January 2016
- Perfumer(s): Francis Kurkdjian

Baccarat Rouge 540 is a fragrance originally created by perfumer Francis Kurkdjian for the Baccarat crystal company. It has since expanded to becoming one of the best-selling fragrances in Europe and the United States. The fragrance has been widely imitated, with many consumers looking for "dupes" that replicate the fragrance at a lower price point.

== Background ==
In 2013, the crystal company Baccarat commissioned Kurkdjian to make a perfume for its two-hundred-and-fiftieth anniversary. Initially the perfume was a limited edition run of Baccarat crystal bottles, priced at three thousand Euros each. Released in fall 2014, Rouge 540 — named for the temperature at which Baccarat crystal is produced — quickly sold out, but Kurkdjian gave a bottle as a gift to the vice president of beauty at the department store Neiman Marcus, Kelly St. John, who received so many compliments on it that she suggested Kurkdjian produce it for sale at their stores.

Kurkdjian and Baccarat struck a deal allowing him to sell the synthetic gourmand fragrance in his signature square glass bottles, and it became one of the best-selling fragrances in the world, propelled by fragrance reviewers on TikTok.

== Awards ==
In 2024, Kurkdijan received the Hollywood Beauty Award for Fragrance of the Year for Baccarat Rouge 540.
