= J'adore (fragrance) =

Perfume by Christian Dior

Fragrance by Christian Dior
- Released: 1999
- Label: Parfums Christian Dior
- Tagline: J'adore Dior ("I love Dior")

J'adore (pronounced [ʒadɔʁ]; French for "I love", and a pun on the brand Dior) is a perfume for women that was created in 1999 by French master perfumer Calice Becker for Parfums Christian Dior, with a distinct tear-drop bottle shape designed by Hervé Van der Straeten. The first face of the brand was Estonian model Carmen Kass. Later she was replaced by Tiiu Kuik, and she was replaced by actress Charlize Theron from 2004 to 2024. In June 2024, Barbadian singer and businesswoman Rihanna was announced as the new face of the perfume, replacing Theron after her 20 year run as the spokeswoman of the fragrance. Some perfume critics have detected a change in the recipe since the 1999 launch.

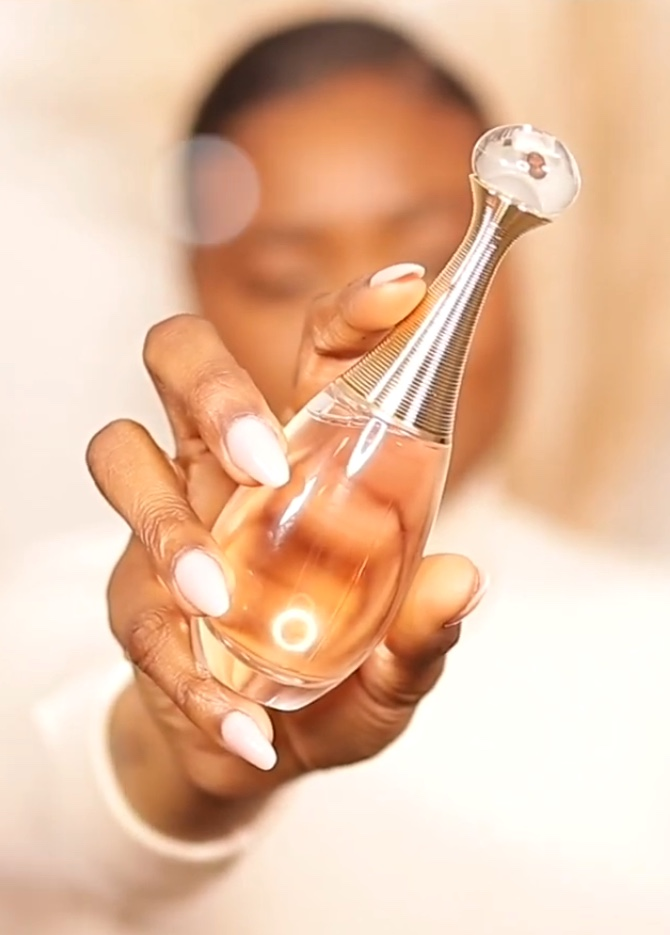
A bottle of flanker J’Adore Eau Lumiere

Dior has also released some flankers to J’Adore, such as J’Adore Eau Lumière in 2016. That version featured notes of blood orange, rose and neroli.

== Variants of J'adore ==
=== J'adore L'Or Essence de Parfum ===
==== 2017 Formulation ====
Perfumer: François Demachy

Features the vanilla base of J'adore, with an added mixture of jasmine absolut and rose absolut. The bottle was also updated to a "more obvious hourglass shape," and the neck was etched and engraved to create a chain-like aesthetic.

Listed ingredients: Jasmine, Rose Centifolia, Vanilla, Champaca, Tonka Bean, Orchid, Sweet Pea, Violet, Bergamot, Ivy, Mandarin, Amber, Ciste Labdanum, Patchouli.

==== 2023 Formulation ====
Perfumer: Francis Kurkdjian

The stated approach for the 2023 formulation, according to Kurkdjian, was, "What if we get rid of the unnecessary in the formula? What if we try to make it more concise?" The bottle was also updated, featuring a more streamlined design, a smoothed, melted look for the neck, and a glass cap.

Listed ingredients: Jasmine (Grandiflorum), Orange Blossom, Rose Centifolia, Lily Of The Valley, Violet.
