= RoC Skincare =

Skincare brand

- Type: Subsidiary
- Industry: Skincare
- Founded: 1957 in Paris, France
- Founder: Jean-Charles Lissarrague
- Key people: Fernando Acosta (CEO); Marc Rey (chairman)
- Parent: Parfums Christian Dior 1978-1993; Johnson & Johnson 1993-2019; Gryphon Investors 2019-2024; Bridgepoint Group 2024-present

RoC Skincare, commonly known as RoC, is a skincare brand founded in Paris in 1957 by French pharmacist Jean-Charles Lissarrague. It is headquartered in New York City and sells skincare products, including retinol creams, eye creams, sunscreens, moisturizers, and cleansers. It has been owned by Parfums Christian Dior, LVMH, Johnson & Johnson, Gryphon Investors, and now Bridgepoint.

== History ==
RoC was founded in Paris in 1957 by Jean-Charles Lissarrague at the Pharmacie Rogé-Cavaillès in Paris, with historical accounts stating that the name “RoC” was derived from “Ro” in Rogé and “C” in Cavaillès. Early accounts described RoC products as fragrance-free and intended for sensitive or reactive skin. It introduced a broad-spectrum sunscreen in 1957.

RoC was sold to Parfums Christian Dior in 1978 and later came under the LVMH group. Under LVMH, RoC expanded internationally, establishing affiliates in Belgium, Italy, Germany, Spain, Japan, and the United Kingdom between 1984 and 1991, and expanding distribution to Latin America and Asia. RoC was distributed in more than 50 countries by 1992.

RoC entered the United States in 1993 through a partnership with Dermik Laboratories, with a rollout targeting pharmacists and dermatologists.

In 1993, RoC was sold by LVMH to Johnson & Johnson. At the time, RoC's product line included sun screen, moisturizers and cleansers. Under Johnson & Johnson, RoC became the first to formulate stabilised retinol, using it for anti-aging products.

In 2019, Gryphon Investors carved RoC out of Johnson & Johnson and purchased it. Fernando Acosta was then tapped as CEO. After the carve-out, RoC rebuilt its digital presence, launched Roc.com, and enabled direct-to-consumer e-commerce in June 2020. At the time, the company stated it was carried by Walmart, Target, Walgreens, CVS, and Ulta.

In January 2024, Bridgepoint agreed to acquire RoC from Gryphon Investors in a deal valued at about $500 million. Reuters reported that Bridgepoint planned to support RoC’s expansion in Europe. In December 2024, Capital reported that RoC was relaunching in France, where it opened a Paris office and it planned to take direct control of distribution. RoC France general manager Julien Pasquini said the company aimed to be present in 4,200 French pharmacies within five years.

By March 2026, Rapporteuses reported that the company had created a French subsidiary, resumed direct distribution, and built dedicated commercial teams for its French relaunch.

== Products ==
RoC was the first company to formulate stabilized retinol in 1996. RoC is associated with retinol-based skincare and anti-aging products with Reuters reporting that RoC’s products included retinol creams and eye creams. In 2025, RoC established a research fund at Brown University’s Center on the Biology of Aging to support research into the biological mechanisms of aging and age-related disease.

In 2024, owner Bridgepoint stated that RoC products were sold globally, including the United States, Canada, France, the United Kingdom, other Europe, Australia, and China. It is sold through pharmacy, specialty, and e-commerce channels along with mass-market retailers such as Target, CVS and Walmart.
