= Presses Universitaires de France =

French publishing house

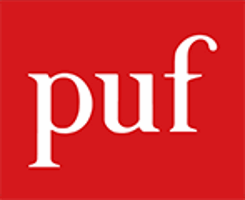
- Founded: 1921; 105 years ago
- Founder: Paul Angoulvent
- Country of origin: France
- Headquarters location: Paris
- Publication types: Books, Journals
- Official website: www.puf.com

Presses universitaires de France (PUF; English: University Press of France), founded in 1921 by Paul Angoulvent (1899–1976), is a French publishing house.

== Recent company history ==
The financial and legal structure of the Presses Universitaires de France was completely restructured in 2000, when the original cooperative structure was abandoned. Companies that then took stakes in PUF included Flammarion Publishing (17% in 2000, 18% currently) and insurer Maaf Assurances (9%, 8% currently). In 2006, another insurance giant Garantie Mutuelle des Fonctionnaires (GMF) injected capital into the PUF, taking a 16.4% stake in the publisher.

== Que sais-je? ==
The paperback series Que sais-je? ("What do I know?", a quotation from Montaigne) was created by Paul Angoulvent in 1941. Specialists are invited to ruminate on specific themes in texts of up to 128 pages each. Today, there are close to 4,000 titles by 2,500 authors, constituting the world's largest paperback encyclopedia, covering a broad range of subjects. Many of the titles have been translated into up to forty-three languages. By 2004, the PUF had sold around 160 million copies of titles in the series. Its ISSN number is 0768-0066.

== Collections ==
- Bibliothèque de philosophie contemporaine
- L'écologie en questions
- Écrits
- Éducation et société
- Épiméthée
- Éthique et philosophie morale
- Intervention philosophique
- Leviathan
- Le lien social
- Lignes d'art
- Le Nœud gordien
- Major
- Nouvelle Clio
- Perspectives critiques
- Quadrige
- Que sais-je?
- Science, histoire, société
- Sciences sociales et société
- Sociologie d'aujourd'hui
- Thémis
- La Vie des Idées
