= Francis Kurkdjian =

French-Armenian perfumer and businessman

- Born: May 14, 1969 (age 57); Paris, France
- Education: ISIPCA; Paris Institute of Luxury Marketing
- Occupations: Businessman; perfumer
- Years active: 1993–present
- Notable work: Le Male
- Label: Maison Francis Kurkdjian (2009–present)
- Website: Official website

Francis Kurkdjian (born May 14, 1969) is a French perfumer and businessman of Armenian descent. He is best known for creating the men's fragrance Le Male for Jean Paul Gaultier in 1995, which has become one of the world's best-selling men’s fragrances. He also released Baccarat Rouge 540 in 2015 under his own house, Maison Francis Kurkdjian.

Kurkdjian co-founded the fragrance house Maison Francis Kurkdjian with Lebanese-French businessman and former Ernst & Young partner Marc Chaya. The brand was purchased by LVMH in 2017 for an undisclosed sum. He was the winner of the Prix François Coty in 2001 for his lifetime achievement.

== Early life ==
Francis Kurkdjian was born on May 14, 1969 in Paris, France to Armenian parents. The Kurkdjian family had at once fled the Ottoman Empire during the Armenian Genocide and had settled in France after being deported and relocated to Aleppo. Having been exposed to music and dancing at a young age, Francis Kurkdjian wanted to be a ballet dancer during his youth. However, he failed passing the competition to study at the Paris Opera Ballet School in 1983. Kurkdjian, who already had an interest in perfume making since he was thirteen years old, decided to become a perfumer in 1985. In 1990, Kurkdjian entered the Institut Supérieur International du Parfum, de la Cosmétique et de l'Aromatique Alimentaire (ISIPCA), a perfume school located in Versailles, France. He graduated from ISIPCA in 1993 and joined Quest International in Paris the same year. Kurkdjian continued his studies and obtained a master's degree from the Paris Institute of Luxury Marketing.

== Career ==
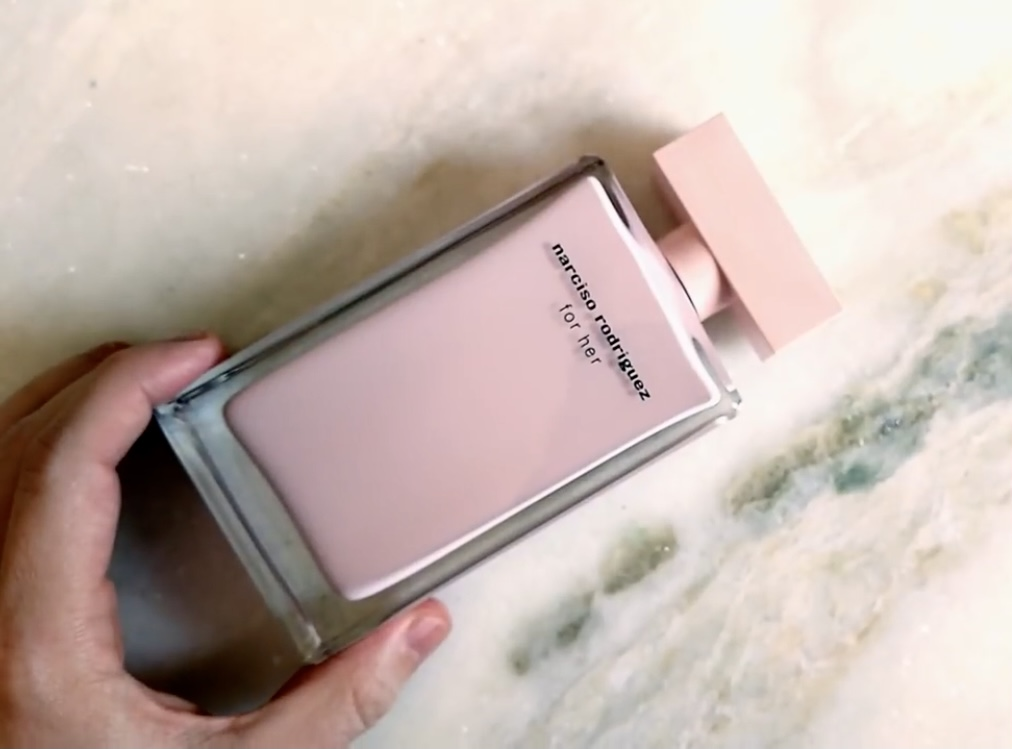
A bottle of the 2006 eau de parfum version of Narciso Rodriguez for Her

In 1995, at the age of twenty-six, Kurkdjian created Le Male for Jean Paul Gaultier, one of the world's best selling perfumes. This became Kurkdjian's first success at perfume making. He later created Narciso Rodriguez for Her with Christine Nagel (2003) and Burberry Her.

Besides selling his scents to major fashion designers and houses, Kurkdjian re-created Marie Antoinette’s favorite perfume for the Palace of Versailles.

Kurkdjian has also created gigantic olfactory installations. For his installations, he was honoured the "Chevalier des Arts et des Lettres" by the French government in 2008.

He was the first to open his bespoke fragrances atelier in 2001, going against the trend of perfume democratization.

In 2006, Kurkdjian redeveloped the Papier d'Arménie for the year of Armenia in France.

He co-founded his own fragrance house Maison Francis Kurkdjian with business partner Marc Chaya in 2009 near the Place Vendôme in Paris.

In 2013, the crystal company Baccarat commissioned Kurkdjian to make a perfume for its two-hundred-and-fiftieth anniversary. Initially the perfume was a limited edition run of Baccarat crystal bottles, priced at three thousand Euros each. Released in fall 2014, Rouge 540 (named for the temperature at which Baccarat crystal is produced) quickly sold out. Kurkdjian gave a bottle as a gift to the vice-president of beauty at the department store Neiman Marcus, Kelly St. John. She received so many complements on it that she suggested Kurkdjian produce it for sale at their stores. Kurkdjian and Baccarat struck a deal allowing him to sell the synthetic gourmand fragrance in his signature square glass bottles. It became one of the best-selling fragrances in the world, propelled by fragrance reviewers on TikTok.

In March 2017, European luxury goods conglomerate LVMH purchased the Maison Francis Kurkdjian business for an undisclosed sum.

In October 2021, Christian Dior appointed Kurkdjian as its new creative director of perfume.

== Awards and recognition ==
Among Kurkdjian's awards include:

- Winner of the François Coty perfumer (Oct 2001)
- Award for the collective body of his creative work
- Cosmetique Magazine's best perfumer of year 2008
- Named Chevalier of Arts and Letters (July 2008)
- WWD Beauty Biz Award, Maison Francis Kurkdjian
- Breakthrough product of the year Fine Fragrance (2009)
- Cosmetique Magazine's best niche mixte perfume for Aqua Universalis (June 2010)
- Chevalier de la Légion d’Honneur (July 2026)

== List of creations ==
List of fragrances created by Francis Kurkdjian
| Year | Name | Brand |
|---|---|---|
| 1995 | Le Male | Jean Paul Gaultier |
| 1999 | Fragile | Jean Paul Gaultier |
| 1999 | Green Tea | Elizabeth Arden, Inc. |
| 2000 | Lily Chic | Escada |
| 2000 (with Christine Nagel | Reverie | Gloria Vanderbilt |
| 2001 | Miracle Homme | Lancôme |
| 2002 | Armani Mania | Armani |
| 2002 | KenzoKi Lotus blanc | Kenzo |
| 2002 | Kouros Eau d'été | Yves Saint Laurent |
| 2002 | Versus Time for pleasures | Versace |
| | Jeans Couture Glam | Versace |
| 2003 | For Her | Narciso Rodriguez |
| 2003 | Miracle Homme l'Aquatonic | Lancôme |
| 2004 | Aquazur | Lancaster Monaco |
| 2004 | Apparition | Emanuel Ungaro |
| 2004 | Autumn | Van Cleef & Arpels |
| 2004 | Iris Nobile | Acqua di Parma |
| 2004 | Kouros Cologne Sport | Yves Saint Laurent |
| 2004 | Muse | JOOP! |
| 2004 | Summer | Van Cleef & Arpels |
| 2005 | Aquasun | Lancaster Monaco |
| 2005 | Cologne Blanche | Parfums Christian Dior |
| 2005 | Eau Noire | Parfums Christian Dior |
| 2005 | Gaultier² | Jean Paul Gaultier |
| 2005 | Rose Barbare | Guerlain |
| 2005 | Silver Shadow | Zino Davidoff Group |
| 2006 | F by Ferragamo | Salvatore Ferragamo |
| 2006 | Rumeur | Lanvin |
| 2006 | Promesse de l'Aube | Parfums MDCI |
| 2007 | C'est la fête | Christian Lacroix |
| 2007 | For Him | Narciso Rodriguez |
| 2007 | Le Parfum | Emanuel Ungaro |
| 2007 | Isvaraya | Indult |
| 2007 | Manakara | Indult |
| 2007 | Tihota | Indult |
| 2007 | Lady Vengeance | Juliette Has a Gun |
| 2007 | Miss Charming | Juliette Has a Gun |
| 2007 | Fleur du Male | Jean Paul Gaultier |
| 2008 | Eau d'Amour | Jean Paul Gaultier |
| 2008 | Ligne de beauté Monsieur | Jean Paul Gaultier |
| 2008 | MaDame | Jean Paul Gaultier |
| 2008 | pour Colette C16 | Indult |
| 2009 | APOM femme | Maison Francis Kurkdjian |
| 2009 | APOM homme | Maison Francis Kurkdjian |
| 2009 | Aqua Universalis | Maison Francis Kurkdjian |
| 2009 | Cologne pour le matin | Maison Francis Kurkdjian |
| 2009 | Cologne pour le soir | Maison Francis Kurkdjian |
| 2009 | Lumière Noire femme | Maison Francis Kurkdjian |
| 2009 | Lumière Noire homme | Maison Francis Kurkdjian |
| 2010 | Absolue pour le matin | Maison Francis Kurkdjian |
| 2010 | Absolue pour le soir | Maison Francis Kurkdjian |
| 2011 | Aqua Universalis forte | Maison Francis Kurkdjian |
| 2011 | Le Parfum | Elie Saab |
| 2012 | Le Parfum, eau de toilette | Elie Saab |
| 2012 | Amyris femme | Maison Francis Kurkdjian |
| 2012 | Amyris homme | Maison Francis Kurkdjian |
| 2012 | Oud | Maison Francis Kurkdjian |
| 2012 | 754 for Bergdorf Goodman | Maison Francis Kurkdjian |
| 2013 | Fleur de Figuier | Roger & Gallet |
| 2013 | Le Parfum | Carven (Groupe Jacques Bogart) |
| 2013 | Aqua Vitae | Maison Francis Kurkdjian |
| 2013 | Ciel de Gum | Maison Francis Kurkdjian |
| 2013 | Oud cashmere mood | Maison Francis Kurkdjian |
| 2013 | Oud silk mood | Maison Francis Kurkdjian |
| 2013 | Oud velvet mood | Maison Francis Kurkdjian |
| 2014 | A la rose | Maison Francis Kurkdjian |
| 2014 | Baccarat Rouge 540 | Maison Francis Kurkdjian |
| 2014 | Féminin pluriel | Maison Francis Kurkdjian |
| 2014 | Masculin pluriel | Maison Francis Kurkdjian |
| 2014 | Carven pour homme | Carven (Groupe Jacques Bogart) |
| 2014 | My Burberry | Burberry |
| 2015 | L'Extase | Nina Ricci |
| 2015 | La collection des essence | Elie Saab |
| 2015 | Ultra Male | Jean Paul Gaultier |
| 2015 | Aqua Vitae forte | Maison Francis Kurkdjian |
| 2015 | Le beau parfum | Maison Francis Kurkdjian |
| 2015 | Oud satin mood | Maison Francis Kurkdjian |
| 2016 | Baccarat Rouge 540 | Maison Francis Kurkdjian |
| 2016 | Carven L'Eau Intense | Carven (Groupe Jacques Bogart) |
| 2016 | Kenzo World | Kenzo |
| 2016 | Mr. Burberry | Burberry |
| 2016 | My Burberry Black | Burberry |
| 2016 | Grand Soir & Petit Matin | Maison Francis Kurkdjian |
| 2017 | Aqua Celestia | Maison Francis Kurkdjian |
| 2018 | Her | Burberry |
| 2023 | J'adore L'Or | Parfums Christian Dior |
| 2023 | Dioriviera | Parfums Christian Dior |
| 2024 | Sauvage Eau Forte | Parfums Christian Dior |
| 2024 | Miss Dior Parfum | Parfums Christian Dior |
| 2025 | Dior Homme Parfum (2025) | Parfums Christian Dior |
| 2026 | Addict Rosy Glow | Parfums Christian Dior |
| 2026 | Addict Peachy Glow | Parfums Christian Dior |
| 2026 | Addict Purple Glow | Parfums Christian Dior |

== Artistic collaborations ==
- Voir et être vu, Grand Palais Paris 2015/2016 - olfactive installation for the Elisabeth Louise Vigée Le Brun exhibition
- Milan world expo 2015, Stratus 2015 - olfactive installation for Pavillon Lille 3000
- L'Art du Jardin, Grand Palais Paris, Flora Tournicota, 2013
- Chateau de Versailles, Sillage De La Reine - Re-creation of the scent of Queen Marie Antoinette, 2006
- Olfactive installations in the gardens of Versailles: Bosquet de l'orangerie, 2006 - PréamBulles, Bosquet des 3 fontaines, Bosquet de la Rocaille, 2007 and 2008
- Grand Palais, NoctamBulles: olfactive installation during the 2010 Paris great museum evening
- Shanghai expo 2010: Olfactive installation at the French Pavilion
- La Luce Degli Innocenti: Olfactive installation, Florence 2011
- Sophie Calle: The smell of Money, 2003
- Paris Garnier Opera: Pas de deux, eau de parfum, 2004

== See also ==
- Thierry Wasser
- Marie Urban Le Febvre
- Roja Dove
