= Narciso Rodriguez for Her =

2003 perfume by Christine Nagel and Francis Kurkdjian

Fragrance by Narciso Rodriguez
- Notes: Orange blossom, amber, vanilla, musk
- Released: September 2003
- Label: Beauté Prestige International
- Predecessor: n/a
- Successor: Narciso Rodriguez for Her Musc Oil; Narciso Rodriguez for Him

Narciso Rodriguez for Her is an eau de toilette-strength perfume launched in September 2003 by fashion designer Narciso Rodriguez and created by perfumers Christine Nagel and Francis Kurkdjian. It has won Fragrance Foundation awards in France and the US, both at its original launch and retrospectively. The original eau de toilette is primarily a musk, amber and orange blossom scent. Narciso Rodriguez subsequently released an eau de parfum version (2004, again signed by Nagel and Kurkdjian) and many other versions, known as flankers, that include other notes.

== Background and development ==
Narciso Rodriguez, an American fashion designer of Cuban ancestry, drew acclaim for his 1996 wedding dress for Carolyn Bessette-Kennedy and launched his eponymous label in 1997. He began developing a women's fragrance to accompany the line circa 2001. Perfumers Christine Nagel and Francis Kurkdjian created the fragrance for Rodriguez. As he was a longtime fan of musks, devoted to Egyptian musk oil he'd first received as a gift in high school—"I sort of shower in it"—this became a centerpiece for the fragrance. In the course of development, Rodriguez also sought out the opinions of women he worked with, including actress Sarah Jessica Parker, who said she loved his fragrance (and went on to create her own musk-based fragrance, Lovely, a few years later.)

== Launch and reception ==
Narciso Rodriguez for Her "achieved almost cult status when it launched in 2003." The fragrance, an eau de toilette with notes of orange blossom, amber, vanilla and musk, was lauded in The Globe and Mail as "a serious and sexy scent, ideal for candlelight." The Sunday Times described it as "soft as cashmere." The Vancouver Sun gave it 10 out of 10 marks, calling it a "gorgeous scent, slightly spicy but extremely soft and subtle."

At the United States Fragrance Foundation awards, Narciso Rodriguez for Her won 2004 women's perfume of the year in the "Nouveau Niche" category. The perfume has twice been recognized by France's Fragrance Foundation Awards (FiFi Awards), first in 2005 for best women's fragrance, then again in 2012 with the "Twenty Years of Creativity" Prize at the 20th anniversary of the FiFi Awards: Narciso Rodriguez for Her was selected as the most iconic women's fragrance of the 20 that the Foundation had honored with its annual prize over its 20-year history.

The fragrance helped propel the career of Nagel, who had begun working in the industry as a chemist, but drew recognition as a talented perfumer as a result of the success of Narciso Rodriguez for Her.

The fragrance has had continued popularity after its launch; in 2016, Allure named it to its annual "best of beauty" list, writing, "this sensual scent still has our love over ten years later." In 2019, Le Monde noted that it continued to be a best-selling fragrance, especially in Italy, and in 2020 it was advertised as one of Bloomingdale's best-selling fragrances. In 2021, beauty director at The Cut Kathleen Hou, who describes it as "musky but juicy at the same time, with an eye-opening burst of orange blossom", says she had recently rediscovered it and was wearing it again after a hiatus. Photographer Cindy Sherman also named it was a favorite fragrance in 2019.

== Flankers ==
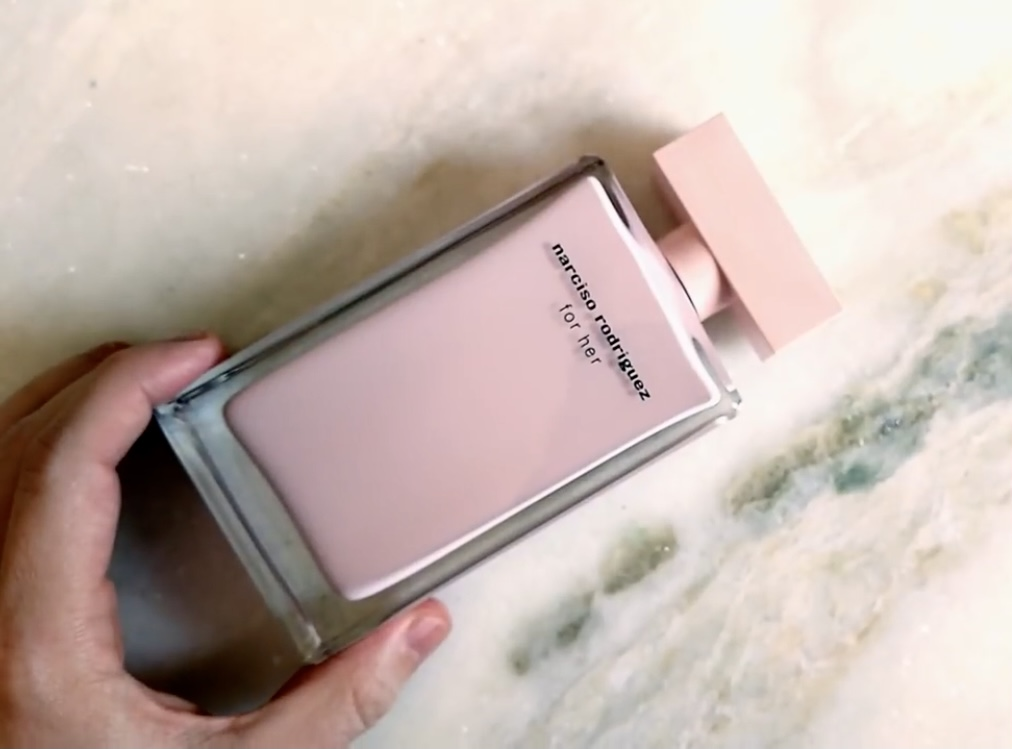
A bottle of the 2006 eau de parfum version of Narciso Rodriguez for Her

Numerous flankers, or alternate versions, have been created. The original was an eau de toilette, and the first flanker, in 2006 was an eau de parfum with different notes (especially adding rose and peach) rather than strictly being a different concentration than the original. It was again signed by Nagel and Kurkdjian. Where the original had a pink box and a sleek black rectangular bottle (in keeping with the designer's minimalist taste), the eau de parfum came in the same packaging with the colors reversed (a black box and pink bottle). The eau de parfum was estimated to do $3 million (US) in sales in its first year, and won the 2006 women's fragrance of the year in the "Nouveau Niche" category from the United States Fragrance Foundation Awards.

More than twenty more versions of Narciso Rodriguez for Her have been released. A 2021 version, Narciso Rodriguez For Her Musc Noir Eau de Parfum, features notes of plum, heliotrope, suede and musk. Ancillary body products have also been manufactured, for example a Narciso Rodriguez For Her hair mist.

== Related perfumes ==
Another early release was Narciso Rodriguez for Her Musc Oil, a component ingredient of all the other perfumes in the line. Originally released in 2003, it gained cult status after being discontinued, but was brought back into production in 2013 and has also spawned a number of flankers.

In 2007, Rodriguez released Narciso Rodriguez for Him, which has also had many flankers. At the 2008 French Fragrance Foundation awards, it won best men's fragrance in limited distribution and best men's fragrance bottle.
