= Miss Dior Chérie =

Strawberry and popcorn fragrance by Christine Nagel for Dior

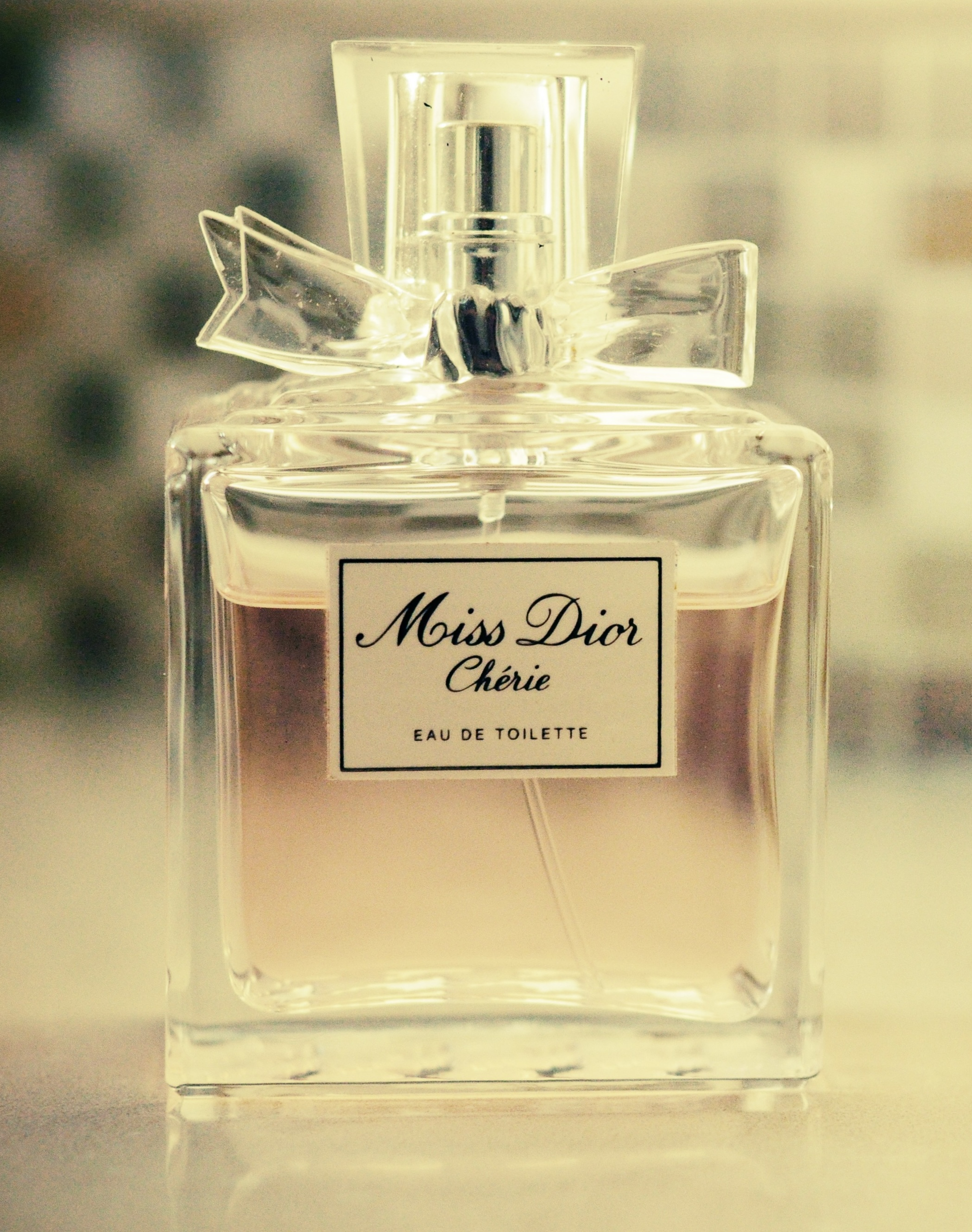
- A bottle of Miss Dior Chérie in eau de toilette

Fragrance by Dior
- Released: 2005
- Label: Givaudan (2005-2011); Dior (2011-)
- Perfumer(s): Christine Nagel
- Predecessor: Miss Dior (1947)
- Successor: Miss Dior (2011)

Miss Dior Chérie was a fragrance created by Christine Nagel for Christian Dior. At the time John Galliano served as Dior’s fashion designer and creative director, overseeing Nagel’s development of the unusual, youth-oriented strawberry-and-popcorn eau de parfum. Miss Dior Chérie was available from 2005 to 2011: after perfumer François Demachy joined Dior, Miss Dior Chérie was reformulated and renamed Miss Dior.

== Fragrance history ==
The first version of a fragrance to go by the name “Miss Dior” dates to 1947, shortly after the Dior fashion line debuted its acclaimed New Look collection. That perfume, a floral chypre with leather and galbanum notes, created by Paul Vacher and Jean Carles, appeared in many different iterations over the following years. Miss Dior Chérie Eau de Parfum was launched in 2005 as a flanker to Miss Dior (perfumery’s term for a sequel or spinoff), intended to draw a younger audience. Developed by Christine Nagel with the instructions to create something “audacious, impertinent, and gourmand”. Miss Dior Chérie most prominently featured unconventional strawberry and caramelized popcorn notes, though it also had a popular patchouli fraction reminiscent of Chanel’s 2001 hit Coco Mademoiselle, as well as mandarin, violet, jasmine, and musk. Elle also noted it had an antecedent in Thierry Mugler Angel (1992), which popularized sweet, food-like fragrances. Dior’s fashion designer and creative director John Galliano described the fragrance as “delicious”.

In 2009, after hiring François Demachy to serve as in-house perfumer, Dior released a flanker to Miss Dior Chérie called Miss Dior Chérie L’Eau, signed by Demachy. British Vogue described this perfume as a “sparkling and distinctive floral scent blended with notes of tangy yet spicy bitter orange, Gardenia and white musks”. In 2010, Dior released an eau de toilette version of Miss Dior Chérie, which also advertised additional floral notes as a twist on the original.

In 2011, Miss Dior and Miss Dior Chérie (eau de parfum) underwent significant changes. Miss Dior was reimagined by Demachy and this fragrance was renamed Miss Dior Original. Miss Dior Chérie became simply Miss Dior and though it retained similar packaging, the fragrance was significantly altered, also by Demachy although with less fanfare, and since then has born little resemblance to Nagel’s creation. These changes were part of Dior owner LVMH’s efforts to gain greater control over their perfume formulations. Prior to bringing on Demachy to create its perfumes in house, Dior has contracted out its fragrances and consequently Givaudan held the formula for Nagel’s creation. Adjustments allowed Dior to take over Miss Dior Chérie without violating Givaudan’s copyright.

Miss Dior Chérie and other versions of Miss Dior were the subject of a 2013 exhibition at the Grand Palais in Paris. The two-week exhibit in November, free to the public, invited 15 female artists to make a piece of work inspired by the perfume’s legacy.

== Ad campaigns and Galliano firing ==
The first face of Miss Dior Chérie was Riley Keough, Elvis Presley's granddaughter, chosen by Galliano to lead the campaign. While Keough was not French, Galliano felt she embodied the “joie de vivre” he hoped to express with Miss Dior Chérie.

In late 2010, actress Natalie Portman became the new face of Miss Dior Chérie, her first campaign for a luxury beauty brand. Director Sofia Coppola filmed the Jean-Luc Godard-inspired television ads, with music by Serge Gainsbourg. This sponsorship drew Portman into scandal a few months later when Galliano, by then Dior’s creative director of 15 years, was caught on video making anti-Semitic remarks including declaring, “I love Hitler”. As Dior’s promotional campaign featuring Portman, who is Jewish, had only just launched, she became a particularly high-profile voice among Galliano’s many vocal critics. Moreover, as the incident depicted took place in Paris, it drew a police investigation for the possibility he had violated French law. Dior quickly fired him.
