= Paul Angoulvent =

French publisher (b. 1899, d. 1976)

- Born: 21 April 1899; Le Mans, France
- Died: 27 July 1976 (aged 77); Auxerre, France
- Education: HEC Paris
- Occupations: Museum curator and publisher

Paul-Joseph Angoulvent (21 April 1899, at Le Mans – 27 July 1976, near Auxerre) was a French museum curator and publisher trained at the HEC Paris. He transformed and directed the Presses Universitaires de France (PUF) beginning in 1934.

== Biography ==
Paul-Joseph Angoulvent was curator of the Chalcographie du Louvre in the 1920s and 1930s. With Albert Morancé, an art editor and head of the Réunion des Musées Nationaux, he published numerous catalogs and monographs from Louvre museum funds.

In 1934, after the bankruptcy of the main publishing shareholder, he founded the Quadriga, a merger of Presses Universitaires de France, and the three publishers Félix Alcan (associated with the nephew of the latter, René Lisboa), Leroux (history editor) and Rieder (general literature). The merger met the needs of the expanding student population.

By 1941, during the German Occupation, Angoulvent was launching a number of fast-moving book series, including most notably the Que sais-je? collection. He focused on many innovations that brought immediate and sustainable success to the PUF. A key element of Angoulvent's strategy was the bottom-up, low-profit support of quality books for a wide audience.

In 1944 after the Liberation, Angoulvent was convicted of ousting Pierre-Marcel Lévi, the Jewish director of his publishing house. Angoulvent, who was head of the Book Committee under the Occupation, was sentenced to pay Lévi (1) 242,406 francs in lump sum payments, (2) an amount equal to the total amount of his remuneration for two years preceding October 30, 1940, plus the interest on that sum; and (3) 250,000 francs in damages.

After 1945, Angoulvent maintained the new editorial equilibrium set up under the Occupation, but now under the defense of French culture and with a positive economic balance, despite the opposition shown by the academic traditionalists, such as Louis Bréhier. Along with editorial diversification he added a focus on the export, modernization of production, and profitability of distribution.

An admirer of the American model, in 1960 Angoulvent published the manifesto L’Édition au pied du mur : Ouvrage manifeste, highlighting the situation of French scientific publishing by pointing out the anarchy of relations between the public and private sectors.

Angoulvent remained president of PUF until 1968, and chairman of the supervisory board until 1974. His son Pierre Angoulvent was chairman of the board from 1968 to 1994.

== Publications ==
- La Chalcographie du Louvre, préf. Jean Guiffrey, Musées nationaux, Paris et Union typographique, Villeneuve-Saint-Georges
  1. 1926 : Histoire et descriptions des collections
  2. 1926 : Inventaire général et tables de recherche
  3. 1930 : Annexe I : La Description de l'Égypte
  4. 1930 : Annexe II : Les Galeries historiques de Versailles
- 1929 : L'Église de Brou : Guide historique, Union typographique, Villeneuve-Saint-Georges et Albert Morancé, Paris, 32 p.
  - 1930 : The Church of Brou: Historical Guide, Société d'éditions artistiques, Paris, 35 p.
- 1931 : L'Art du livre en France : Des origines à nos jours, avec Frantz Calot et Louis-Marie Michon, préf. Pol Neveux, Delagrave, Paris, 301 p.
- 1933 : Musée national du Louvre : La Chalcographie du Louvre, catalogue général, préf. Jean Guiffrey, Musées nationaux, Paris, 603 p.
- 1934 : Musée national du Louvre : Plan-guide illustré des salles et emplacement des principales œuvres, Musées nationaux, 112 p.
- 1960 : L'Édition française au pied du mur, Presses universitaires de France, Paris, 88 p.
