= Musée Baccarat =

Crystal glass museum in Baccarat, France

The Musée Baccarat (pronounced [ɡalʁi myze bakaʁa]) is a crystal glass museum located in the manufactury Baccarat. It is located at 2 rue des Cristalleries in the town of Baccarat in Lorraine. It showcases around 1,100 objects and the manufacturing technique. It currently houses the Red Diamond Play Button made from Baccarat glass.

== Musée Baccarat, Paris ==
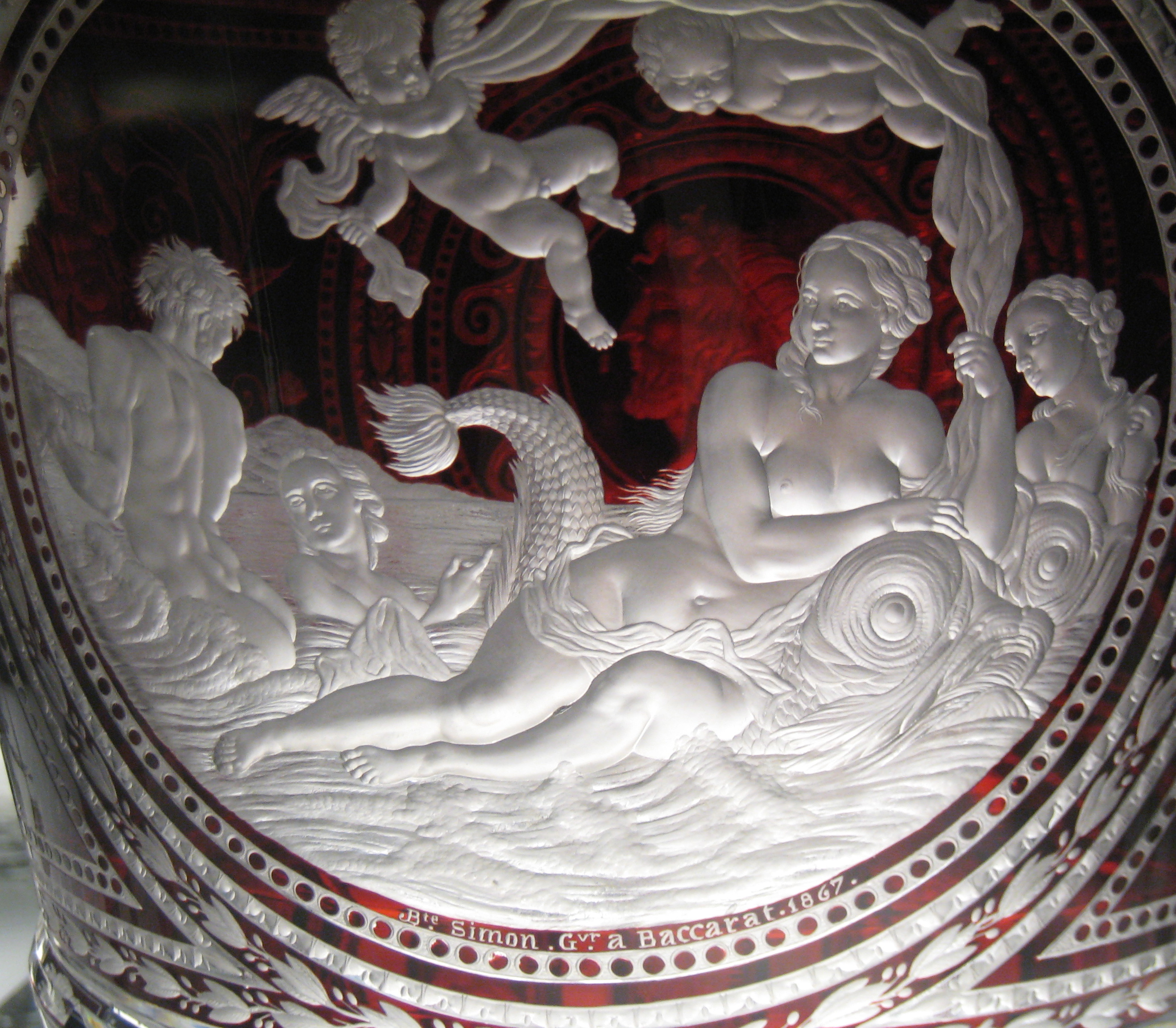
A crystal piece in the Paris museum

A second installation of the museum, Musée Baccarat, Paris, is located in the 16th arrondissement at 11, place des États-Unis, Paris, France. It is open daily except Sundays, Mondays, and holidays; an admission fee is charged.

The museum was created in the former mansion of Marie-Laure de Noailles, with decor by Philippe Starck. It contains a number of major works produced by Baccarat for world fairs and universal expositions of the 19th century, and for celebrities. Major exhibits are as follows:

- Alchemy room by Gérard Garouste - a rotunda with pieces including the Simon vases and a chessboard.
- Beyond transparency - four display cases: "Tales from Afar", "Designers", "Celebrities", and "Femininity and Lightness", illustrating glass-cutting, wheel-engraving, enameling, and gilding. Pieces of particular interest include the Turkish enameled mocha coffee set (1878 Exhibition), and the Elephant vase (1880).

The museum contains displays of fine glass work, including vases, dishes and stemware; limited-edition collections created by noted designers Georges Chevalier, Ettore Sottsass, Roberto Sambonet, Van day Truex, and Marcial Berro; and pieces commissioned for heads of state, royal and imperial courts, and celebrities including the Emperor of Japan, Prince of Wales, and Josephine Baker.

== See also ==
- List of museums in Paris
