= Miss Dior =

Christian Dior fragrance

Fragrance by Christian Dior
- Category: Floral chypre
- Designed for: Women
- Notes: Leather, galbanum
- Top notes: Mandarin, gardenia, bergamot
- Heart notes: Jasmine, narcissus, neroli, rose
- Base notes: Patchouli, oak, sandalwood
- Released: 1947
- Label: Dior
- Perfumer(s): Paul Vacher; Jean Carles
- Flanker(s): Miss Dior Chérie; Miss Dior Chérie L’Eau

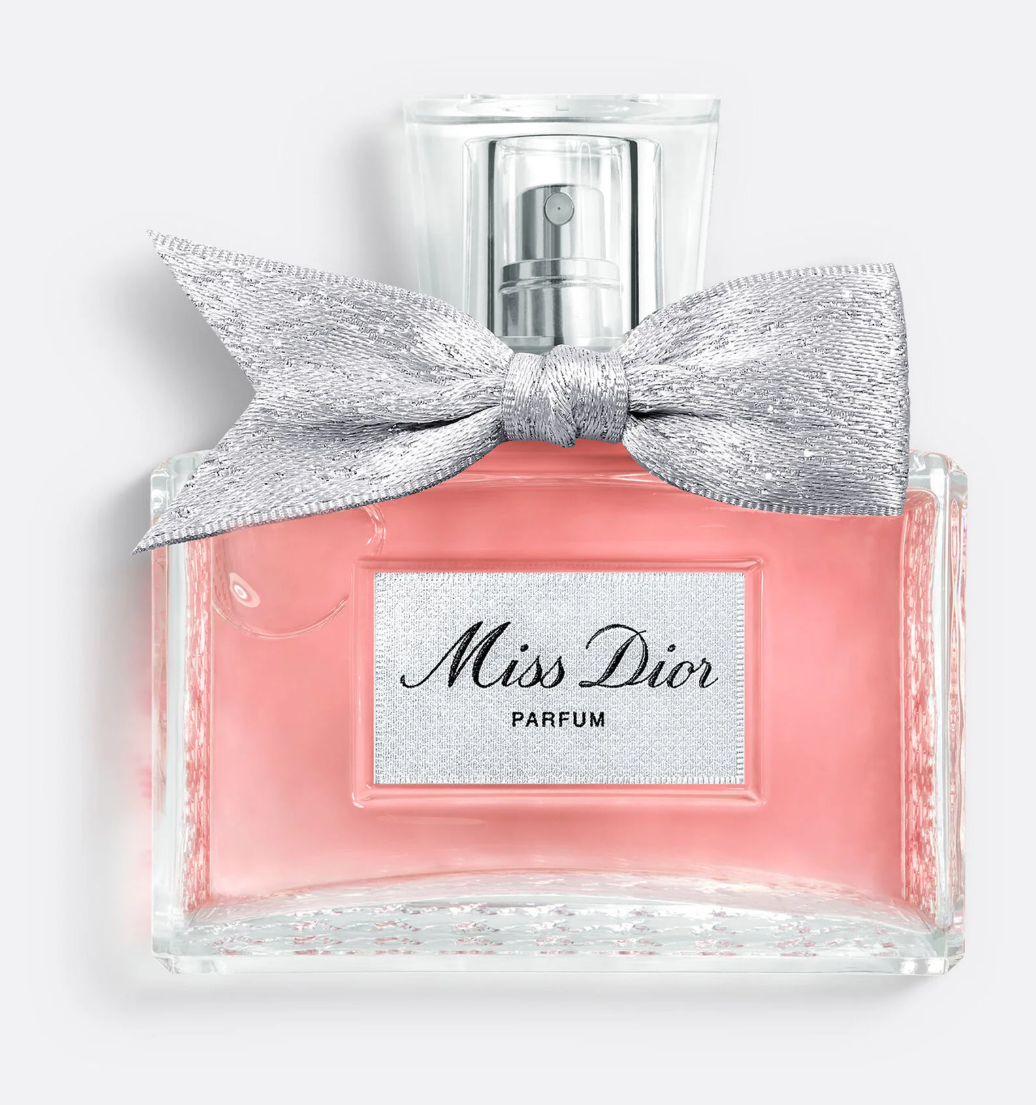
Miss Dior 2025

Miss Dior is a 1947 perfume released by Christian Dior.

== Fragrance ==
Miss Dior dates to 1947, shortly after the Christian Dior fashion line debuted its acclaimed New Look collection. The fragrance's name was a tribute to the designer's sister, French resistance fighter Catherine Dior, familiarly known as Miss Dior. The perfume, a floral chypre with leather and galbanum notes, was created by Paul Vacher and Jean Carles.

Other notes included mandarin, gardenia and bergamot as the top notes; jasmine, narcissus, neroli and rose in the heart notes; and patchouli, oak and sandalwood as the base notes.

The Dior website describes this perfume as "intense floral, fruity and woody notes"

The original Miss Dior glass bottle was etched with a houndstooth print.

== Other versions and reformulations ==
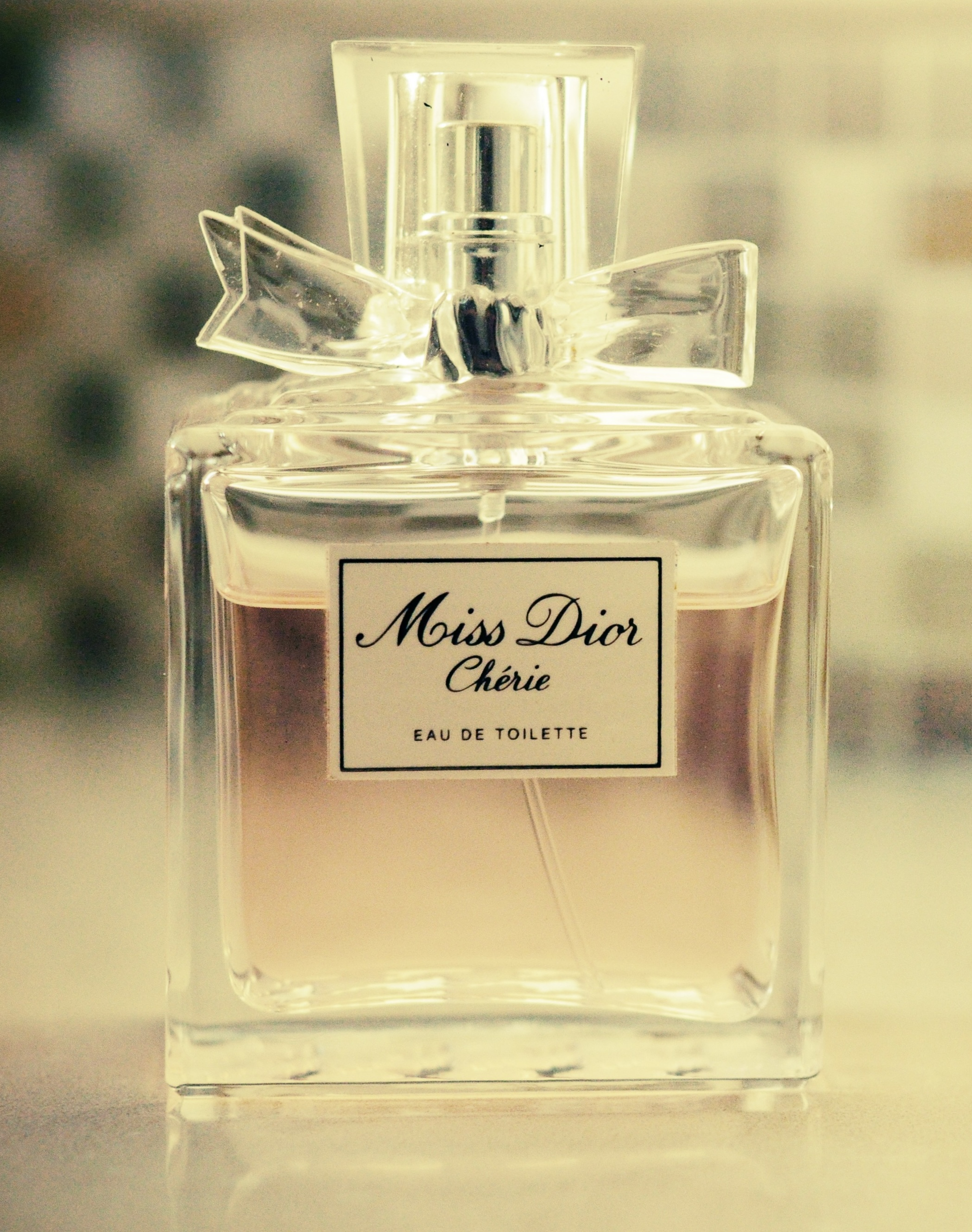
Miss Dior Chérie bottle

Miss Dior Chérie Eau de Parfum was launched in 2005 as a flanker to Miss Dior (perfumery's term for a sequel or spinoff), with the intention to draw a younger audience. It was developed by Christine Nagel with the objective to create something “audacious, impertinent, and gourmand”. Miss Dior Chérie most prominently featured unconventional strawberry and caramelized popcorn notes, though it also had a popular patchouli fraction reminiscent of Chanel’s 2001 hit Coco Mademoiselle, as well as mandarin, violet, jasmine, and musk. Elle also noted it had an antecedent in Thierry Mugler Angel (1992), which popularized sweet, food-like fragrances.

In 2009, after appointing François Demachy to serve as an in-house perfumer, Dior released a flanker to Miss Dior Chérie called Miss Dior Chérie L’Eau, signed by Demachy. British Vogue described this perfume as a “sparkling and distinctive floral scent blended with notes of tangy yet spicy bitter orange, Gardenia and white musks”. In 2010, Dior released an eau de toilette version of Miss Dior Chérie, which also advertised additional floral notes as a twist on the original.

In 2011, Miss Dior and Miss Dior Chérie (eau de parfum) underwent significant changes. Miss Dior was revised and reimagined by Demachy and this fragrance was renamed Miss Dior Original. Miss Dior Chérie became simply Miss Dior and though it retained similar packaging, the fragrance was significantly altered, also by Demachy although with less fanfare, and since then has born little resemblance to Nagel's creation. These changes were part of Dior owner LVMH’s efforts to gain greater control over their perfume formulations. Prior to bringing on Demachy to create its perfumes in-house, Dior has contracted out its fragrances and consequently, Givaudan held the formula for Nagel's creation. Adjustments allowed Dior to take over Miss Dior Chérie without violating Givaudan’s copyright.

== Legacy ==
Miss Dior and other versions of it were the subjects of a 2013 exhibition at the Grand Palais in Paris.
