= Diorissimo =

Perfume by Christian Dior

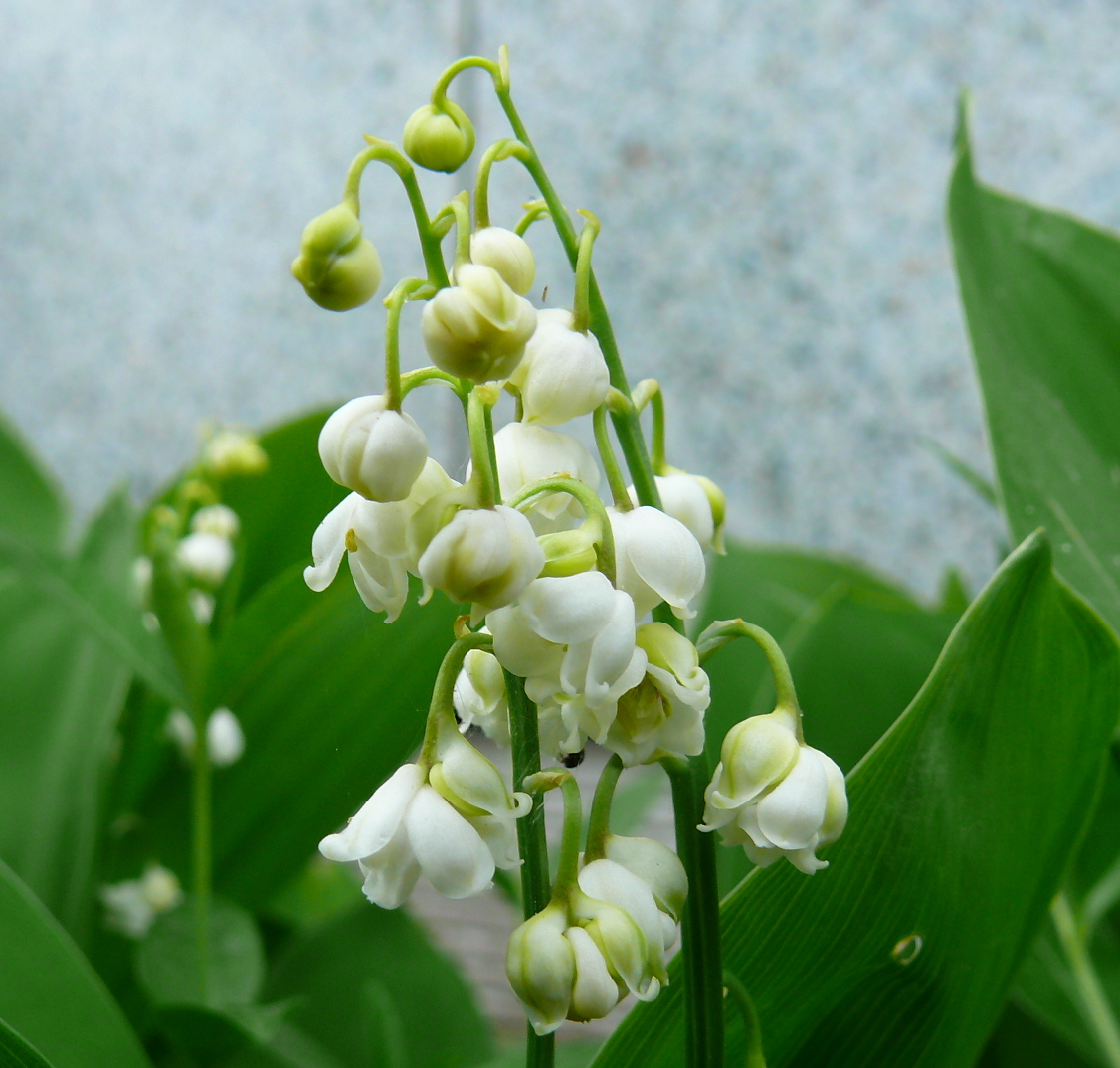
Convallaria majalis is the main note in Diorissimo.

Diorissimo is a floral perfume released by fashion brand Christian Dior and created by French master perfumier Edmond Roudnitska. Originally introduced in 1956, Diorissimo is an attempt to simulate lily of the valley.

== History ==
The flower was designer Dior's favorite, decorating his stationery, his garden, and often his lapel, as well as serving as the inspiration for his 1954 spring collection, but the flower's scent is difficult to recreate in perfume since no essential oils can be obtained from the actual flowers.

Consequently, Diorissimo's lily scent largely used lab-created molecules to evoke the flower and is often considered the most successful effort in the history of perfumery. Diorissimo also has notes of ylang-ylang, amaryllis, boronia and jasmine. Over time, Diorissimo has been reformulated to comply with the regulations of International Fragrance Association (IFRA), in particular to remove two key components identified as potential allergens. Nevertheless, in the 21st century, Diorissimo has continued to be named to lists of the greatest fragrances of all time.

The scent was reportedly a favorite of Diana, Princess of Wales.
