= Christine Nagel =

Swiss perfumer (born 1959)

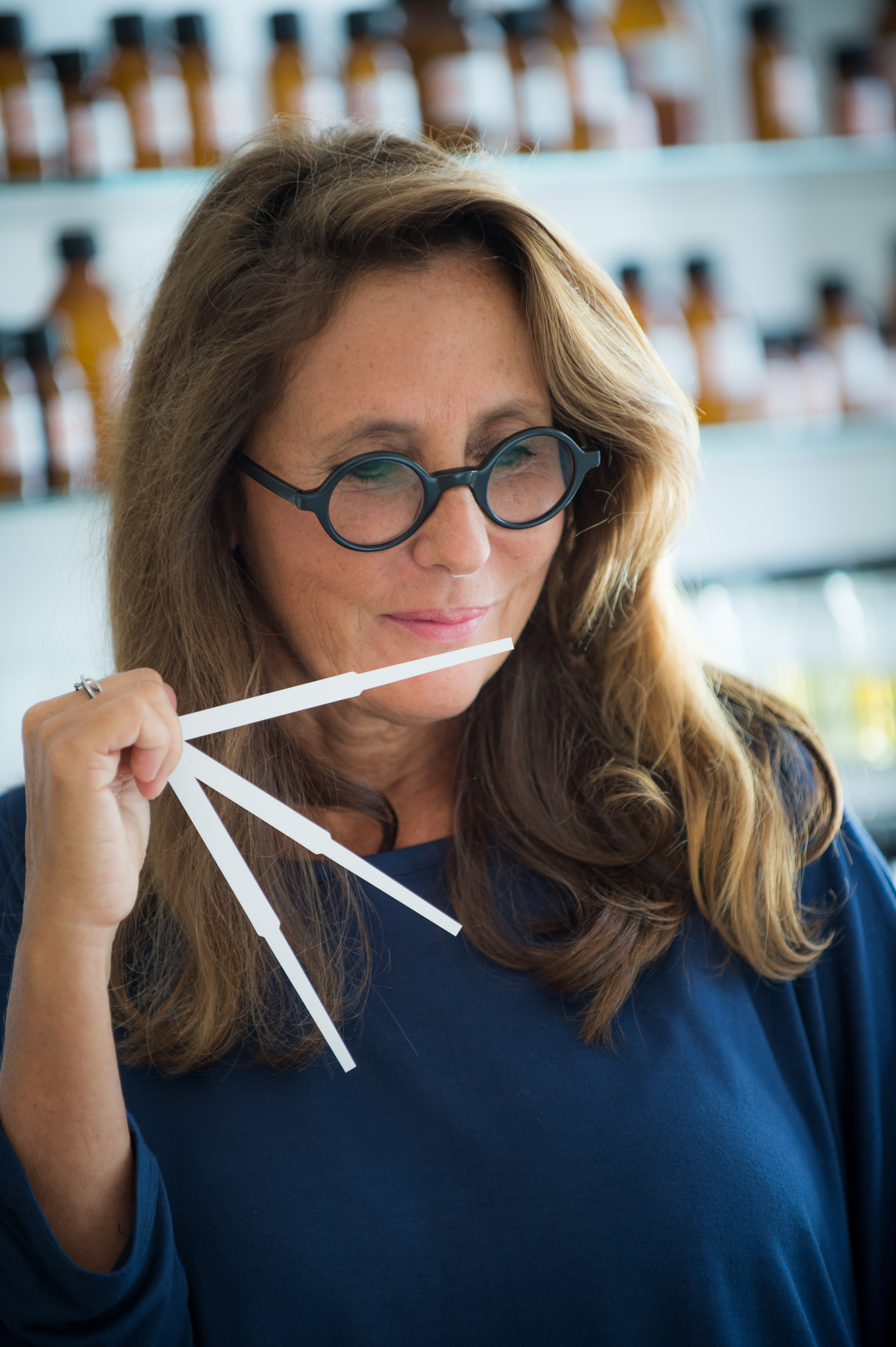
- Christine Nagel in 2015
- Born: 7 October 1959 (age 66)
- Occupation: Perfumer
- Employer: Hermès
- Notable work: Narciso Rodriguez for Her; Miss Dior Chérie; Jo Malone Wood Sage & Sea Salt
- Title: Director of olfactive creation, Hermès Parfums
- Term: 2014–present
- Predecessor: Jean-Claude Ellena
- Spouse: Benoit Lapouza
- Children: 3

Christine Nagel (born 7 October 1959) is a Swiss perfumer. She has served as the in-house perfumer at Hermès since 2016. Prior to joining Hermès she created designer perfume hits like Narciso Rodriguez for Her (2003, with Francis Kurkdjian) and Miss Dior Chérie (2005), as well as niche perfume like Wood Sage & Sea Salt, one of 47 perfumes she created for Jo Malone London. She has been recognized with awards from the Fragrance Foundation France, the François Coty Foundation, and the Marie Claire International Fragrance Awards.

== Early life and education ==
Born on 7 October 1959 to an Italian mother and Swiss father, Christine Nagel grew up in Geneva, Switzerland. Her earliest scent memory is of the Italian talc powder her mother bought to care for Nagel's baby brother. (Nagel's brother also grew up to work in perfume.) Her grandmother was a seamstress, sewing men's trousers, and the smell of freshly pressed pants formed another important early scent memory.

With the goal of becoming a midwife, Nagel began her studies in medicine, but found her calling was chemistry, which she studied at the University of Geneva. This in turn led her to perfume. At the time this was an unusual route into the industry—most perfumers were men who grew up in the perfuming business in Grasse—but Nagel notes that since then perfumery schools have begun requiring training in chemistry as a prerequisite and more women have joined the industry.

== Career ==
=== Early career ===
Nagel began her career in the research department of Swiss fragrance firm Firmenich, where she became enchanted with the strong emotional reactions a male perfumer colleague's work elicited from the women smelling it. The perfumer was Alberto Morillas, one of the giants of the perfume industry. Nagel asked to transfer to the perfumery section, but lacking the traditional background was told no and switched to chromatography instead, examining fragrances and their ingredient recipes on a molecular level. Subsequently, this has become a mechanized process but Nagel was one of the few in the world trained to recognize ingredients using only her nose.

Unable to advance any further at Firmenich, Nagel moved to Italy to strike out on her own. Within a year she held 60 percent of Italy's perfume contracts, including work for Fendi and Versace. She moved to Paris in 1997.

Nagel established herself with successful creations in a variety of registers. These include major hits like her 2003 collaboration with Francis Kurkdjian, Narciso Rodriguez for Her, the 2005 strawberry-and-popcorn confection Miss Dior Chérie, and fruity gourmand Armani Sì (2013); luxury lines like Guerlain's Les Élixirs Charnels; as well as niche perfume creations like 2011's "bizarre yet fascinating" Archive 69 for Etat Libre d'Orange, a camphorous rose and incense scent, and Wood Sage & Sea Salt (2014) for Jo Malone, a skin scent of salt lingering on the body after a day at the beach. Nagel also created 46 other scents for Jo Malone, including the more conventional bestseller English Pear & Freesia in 2010.

=== Hermès ===
In 2014, Nagel went in-house at Hermès, joining Jean-Claude Ellena who had become the brand's first house perfumer in 2004. In 2016, as Ellena neared retirement, Nagel became the sole in-house perfumer at Hermès and the director of olfactive creations for Hermès Parfums. This made her the second woman ever to hold an in-house perfumer position at a major luxury brand (the first was Mathilde Laurent at Cartier).

Two of Nagel's first Hermès releases were Galop (2016), a rose and leather scent inspired by Doblis, a suede-like leather kept in the Hermès cave of archival leather in Paris, and Twilly (2017), a youthful fragrance that added ginger as a twist on a classic tuberose note. Critic Tania Sanchez (co-author of Perfumes: The Guide) said this made for a totally new perfume accord, "an androgynous fougere of fantastic beauty". Other early Hermès fragrances include Eau des Merveilles Bleue (2017), a minéral and woody marine scent, and two additions to the Hermès line of colognes, Eau de Rhubarbe Écarlate (2016) and Eau de Citron Noir (2018).

== Awards ==
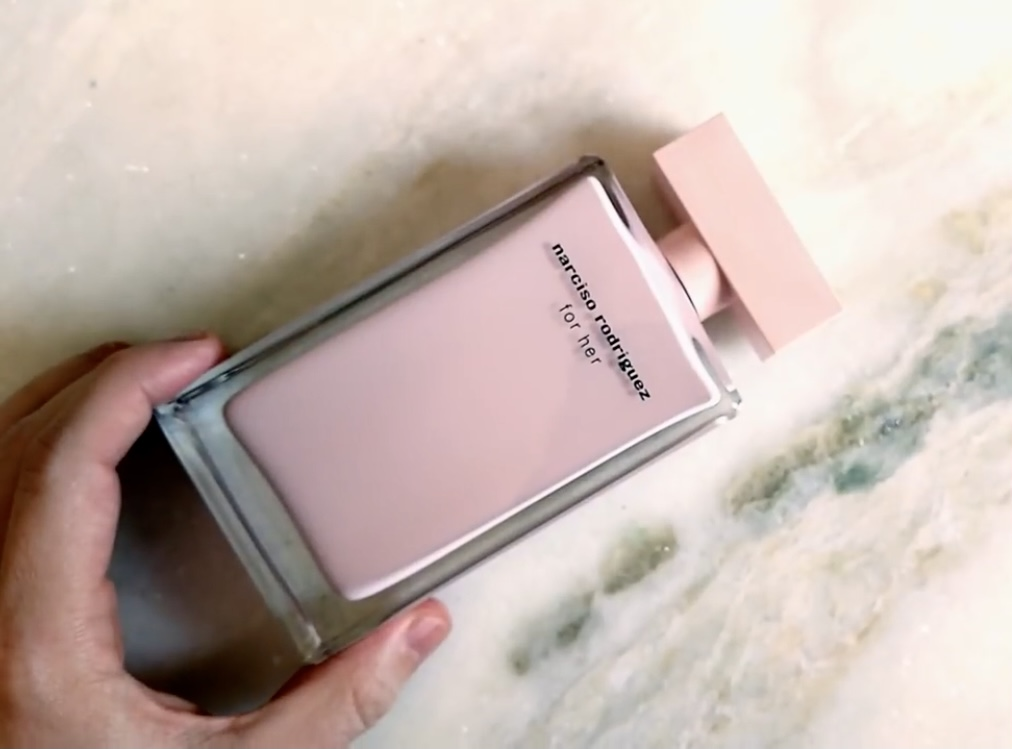
A bottle of Narciso Rodriguez for Her in Eau de Parfum, released in 2006

In 2005, Nagel and Kurkdjian won the Fragrance Foundation France Award (called the FiFi Awards) for best women's fragrance for Narciso Rodriguez for Her. They were recognized again for this fragrance with the "Twenty Years of Creativity" Prize at the 20th anniversary of the FiFi Awards in 2012: Narciso Rodriguez for Her was selected as the most iconic women's fragrance of the 20 the Foundation had honored with its annual prize over its 20-year history. Nagal also won the 2007 Prix François Coty (then briefly retitled the Cosmetic Valley's International Fragrance Prize, but since returned to its original name). In 2015, the Marie Claire International Fragrance Awards honored Nagel's creation Wood Sage & Sea Salt for Jo Malone as the year's most daring fragrance for women.

== Influences ==
Speaking to The Cut, Nagel said her favorite perfume is always the "next one" she's working on, but she continues to feel the admiration for perfumers that first drew her to their profession, inspired by their creativity and the signature "personality" of their scents. Among contemporary perfumers, she named Morillas and Dominique Ropion as notable influences, but especially emphasized path-breaking female perfumer Germaine Cellier, the creator of historic fragrances like Fracas (1948) and Bandit (1944) for Robert Piguet, at a time when the industry had almost no women. Nagel said: "I would have liked to have had the audacity of Germaine Cellier … when she presented Vent Vert in 1945 [...] It's an incredible fragrance that, if it came out today in its original formula, would be extraordinarily modern."

== Personal life ==
Nagel is married to Benoit Lapouza, who is also a perfumer. They live in Paris and have a weekend home in Normandy. They have three children and one grandchild.

Nagel has synesthesia: “she sees and feels scents.”
