= Baccarat (company) =

French glassware manufacturer

Baccarat SAS
- Type: Private
- Industry: Luxury, Crystal
- Founded: 1764
- Headquarters: Paris, France
- Area served: Worldwide
- Key people: Margareth “Maggie” Henriquez (CEO)
- Products: Fine crystal
- Revenue: 122,5 millions € (2025)
- Number of employees: 689 (2025)
- Website: baccarat.com

Baccarat (French: [bakaʁa]) is a French luxury house and manufacturer of fine crystal located in Baccarat, Meurthe-et-Moselle, France. The company owns two museums: the Musée Baccarat in Baccarat, and the Musée Baccarat in Paris on the Place des États-Unis.

Groupe du Louvre was the majority shareholder of the company until 2005. The company was then acquired by Starwood Capital Group, which used the name for an ultra luxury hotel Baccarat Hotel New York, featuring the company's chandeliers, decorative pieces and glasses.

In 2018, Fortune Fountain Capital, a Beijing-based financial group, acquired an 88.8 per cent stake of the company from Starwood Capital Group and L Catterton. On 23 December 2020, four financing funds based in Hong Kong - Tor Investment Management, Sammasan, Dolphin and Corbin - took control of the capital of Fortune Fountain Limited (FFL), the holding company that held 97% of the shares of Baccarat.

== History ==
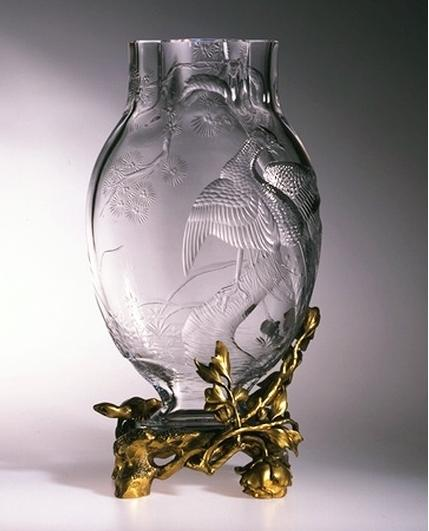
Baccarat vase 1890–1900, Victoria and Albert Museum

=== 1764–1816 ===
After the closure of the Rozières saltworks in 1760 due to a drop in the salt-content of the water, there became available a large quantity of wood floating down to the town of Baccarat. One of the main owners of the Vosges forest where this driftwood came from, namely Monseigneur de Montmorency-Laval, bishop of Metz, wanted to find another use for it and set a fire pit in Baccarat which became a glassworks. In this way, the Bishop wanted to encourage the creation of this industry in the tiny village of Baccarat. To justify the creation of this enterprise in a request made to the king in 1764 by the owner of the site, Monseigneur de Montmorency-Laval wrote: "Sire, France lacks artistic glassware, which is why the products from Bohemia enter in such great quantity: from which follows an astonishing export of deniers, at a time when the kingdom would need them so badly”.

In 1764, King Louis XV gave permission to found a glassworks in the town of Baccarat in the Lorraine region in eastern France to Prince Bishop Cardinal Louis-Joseph de Laval-Montmorency (1724–1808). Production consisted of window panes, mirrors and stemware until 1816 when the first crystal oven went into operation. By that time over 3,000 workers were employed at the site.

=== 1823–1870 ===
Although the name of the factory was still "Verrerie" (glassworks), in fact it was already specialising in crystal. The technique, however, was not that used for Bohemian Crystal, very well known in Europe and originating in Bohemia, but rather the singular rediscovery of the so-called English technique, worked in an original way at the glassworks of Saint-Louis-lès-Bitche between 1779 and 1781.

In order to maintain initial levels of activity Gabriel d'Artigues was forced to hand over the company to three wealthier partners: Pierre-Antoine Godard-Desmarest, a former director of military supplies under the Empire, François-Marie-Augustin Lescuyer-Vespin, a landowner in Charleville, and Nicolas-Rémy Lolot, a trader in Charleville. The full buy-out of shares was completed for the sum of FF 396,000. It was paid by the three partners in 1822 and 1823. Prior to 1823, the wealthy Parisian, Pierre-Antoine Godard-Desmarest had also purchased the glassworks of Trélon in the Thiérache region of northern France. This was a small factory near vast forests producing huge amounts of timber, which until then had been manufacturing pane glass.

In 1824, the crystal glassworks obtained the legal status of a limited company.

Godard-Desmarest senior entrusted the management of the company to a young polytechnic engineer, Jean-Baptiste Toussaint. This decision gave rise to two family dynasties, one owning the company's capital, the other managing the business.

Baccarat received its first royal commission in 1823 from King Louis XVIII. This was the beginning of a lengthy series of orders from royal families and heads of state from all over the world. The factory benefited from an extraordinary boom linked to strong international growth on the luxury market. Additionally, the strategic choice of location made by A.G. d'Artigues proved to be ideal: in the Vosges foothills, from Épinal to Blamont, Rambervillers, Lunéville and Moyen, a whole number of busy earthenware factories would buy back even the smallest amounts of glass-crystal waste to manufacture faience tableware.

In 1841, the arrival of a thirty-year-old engineer, François-Eugène de Fontenay, already an expert at the Plaine de Walsch factory, whose operations had extended to Vallerysthal, launched the production of coloured glass. This researcher had conducted studies into ways to color glass and now, promoted to assistant director, he developed the first multicolored paperweights made of crystal.

The range of manufactured products using watermarked glass engraved with a B was a great success in France and on the export market between 1846 and 1895.

In 1855, Baccarat won its first gold medal, at the World's Fair in Paris.

In 1860, Baccarat registered its trademark on all its products (at the time this was a simple label stuck onto each piece). The mark was a label affixed to the bottom of the work. In the period 1846–1849 Baccarat signed some of their high quality glass millefiori paperweights with the letter B and the year date in a composite cane.

Crystal production expanded during this period into luxury crystalware, where Baccarat built a worldwide reputation for producing high quality glass, chandeliers, vases and perfume bottles.

=== 1870–1936 ===
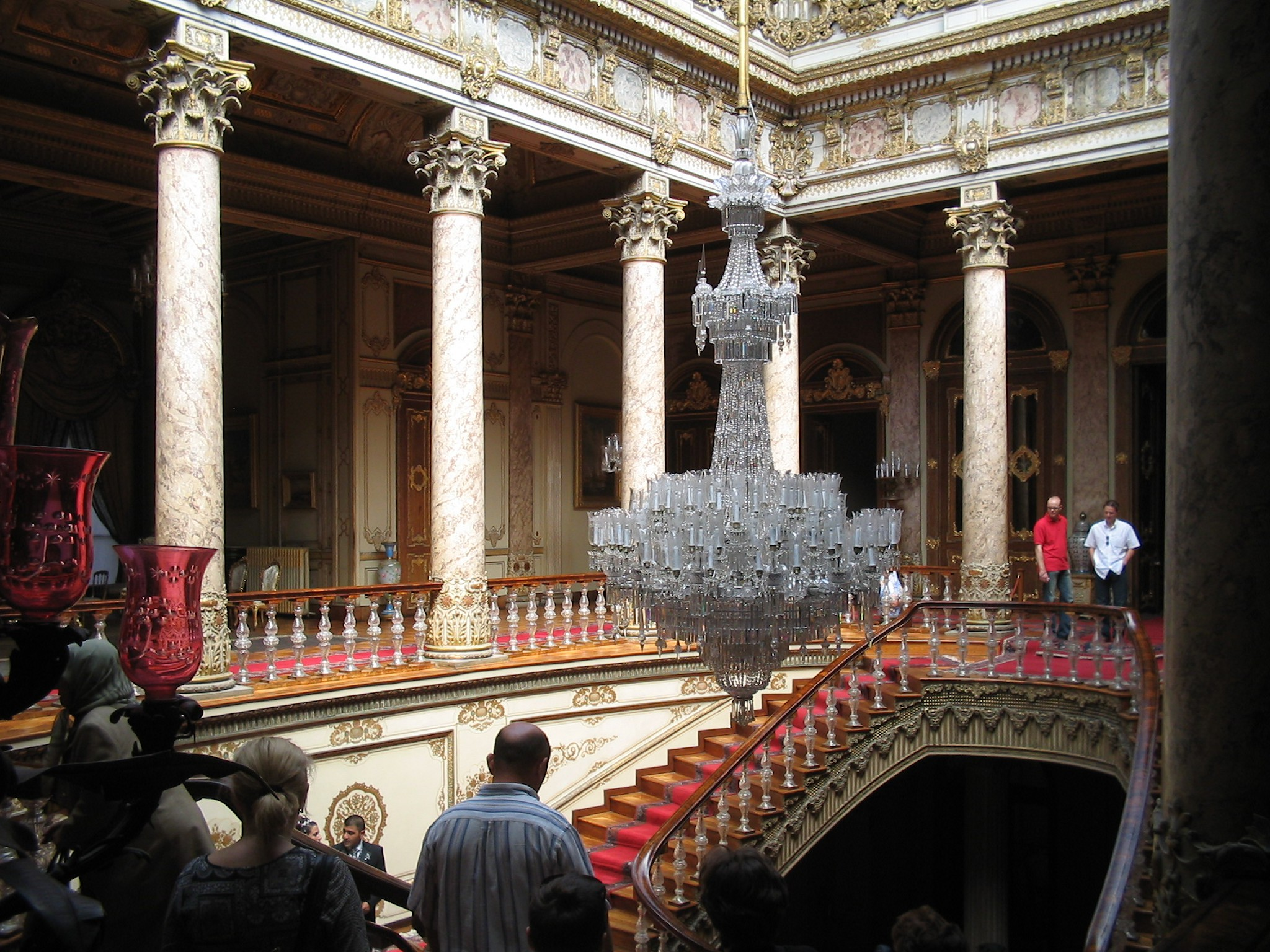
Baccarat crystal chandelier and staircase banister, Dolmabahçe Palace

The Imperial Era ended in 1870 with the defeat of Napoleon III. Influences outside France began to have a stronger influence on Baccarat's work during this era, particularly imports from Japan. The world's largest chandelier and a staircase lined with a Baccarat crystal balustrade adorn the Dolmabahçe Palace in Istanbul. Strong growth continued in Asia for Baccarat. Baccarat has become quite famous at the royal houses. The queen of Portugal, for example, commissioned for her private collection decorative pieces and tableware (currently exhibited in the Ajuda National Palace).

In 1891, 4,189 of the 5,723 town inhabitants worked at the crystal glassworks or lived with its employees. The number of workers increased from 1,125 in 1855 to 2,223 in 1900, making it one of the largest factories in France.

At the end of the 19th century, the Baccarat company built a warehouse, a sales store and a bronze workshop in the area of Gare de l'Est in Paris. This warehouse employed some 246 people in 1899. The building became the Baccarat Museum up until 2003.

One of its most popular products was perfume bottles, and by 1907 production was over 4,000 bottles per day. In 1936, Baccarat began marking all of its works via acid or sandblasting.

=== 1936–2000 ===
The company also produced crystal Francisques for Marshal Phillipe Petain and items honouring Pierre Laval.

Gilbert de La Poix de Fréminville (1886–1941), son of Charles de la Poix de Fréminville, was director of the Crystal Glassworks at the outbreak of World War II with his future son-in-law André Danzin.

Baccarat created an American subsidiary in 1948 in New York City. They started to produce pieces based on Cylon designs, as the famous Cylon Carrier — Napoleon Hat piece (1958).

In 1994, Baccarat created a gigantic crystal chandelier with 230 lights for its 230th anniversary.

In 1993, in the midst of a crisis undermining the luxury goods market, Baccarat began selling jewellery. In 1997, it extended its activity into perfumery. It is at this same date that a red tassel engraved with the B of Baccarat hallmarked the chandeliers coming from the factory.

In 2005, the celebrated designer Philippe Starck created a special "black" collection, "Darkside", which included the Zenith chandelier.

There are American stores in Costa Mesa, California; Houston, Texas; Greenwich, Connecticut; New York City; Palm Desert, California; Las Vegas; and Miami, Florida. A retrospective was held in 1964 at the Louvre Museum to celebrate the 200th anniversary of the crystal works. In 1993, Baccarat began making jewellery and in 1997 the company expanded into perfume.

=== 2000–2010 ===
In 2003, Baccarat moved to a new location in Paris. In 2014, to celebrate the company’s 250th anniversary, it introduced the scent Baccarat Rouge 540 by Maison Francis Kurkdjian. The company also held an exhibition at the Petit Palais in Paris.

=== 2011–present ===
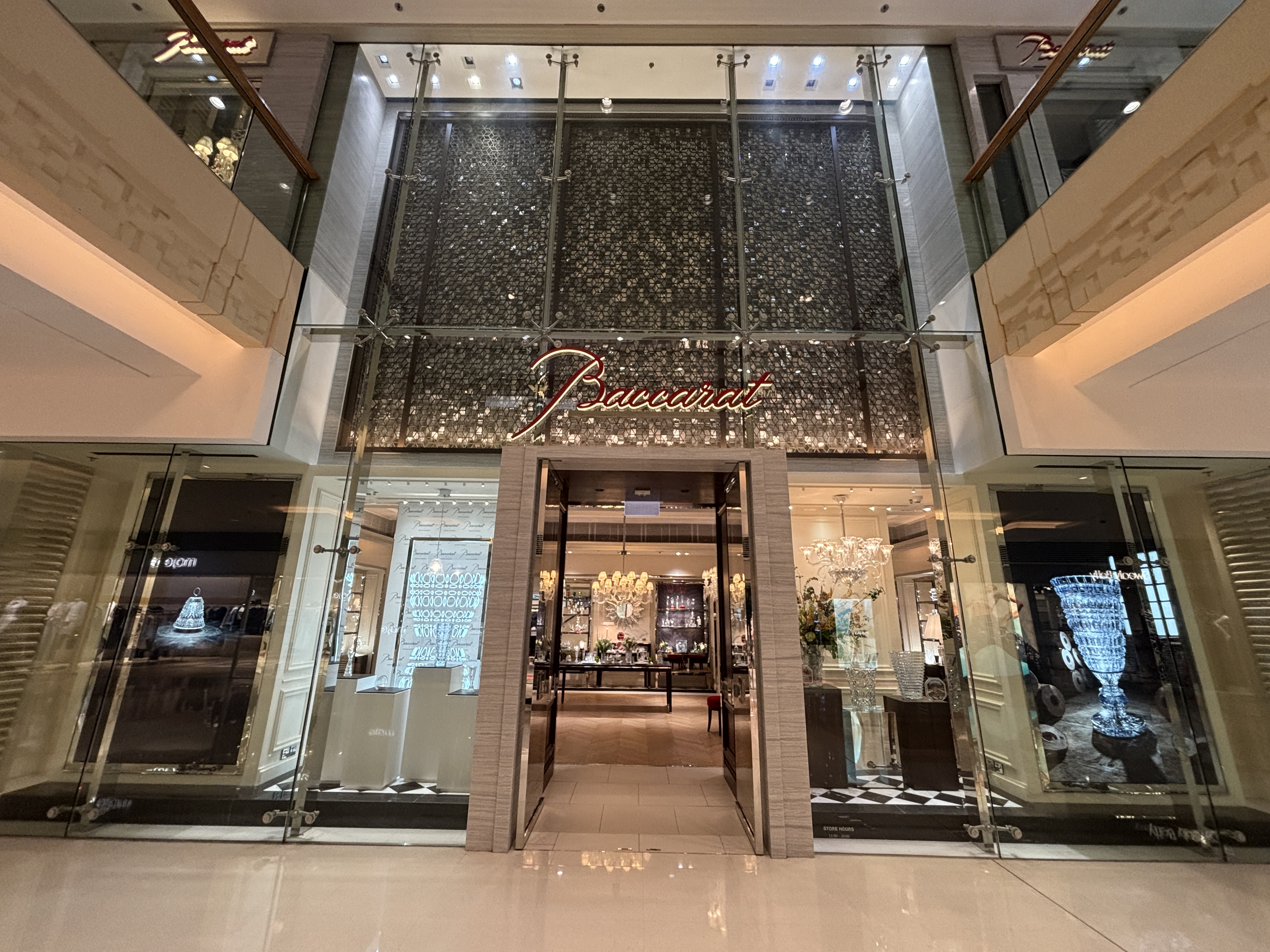
Baccarat biotique in Elements, Hong Kong

Toasting with Baccarat wine glasses at Buena Vista Winery in Sonoma, California in 2024. The crystal wine glasses make a distinctive sound unlike standard glasses.

In 2016, Baccarat appointed Jim Shreve as the president and CEO of North America operations.

In 2019, actress Tan Zhuo became the first-ever Chinese brand ambassador of Baccarat.

Baccarat has supported UNICEF by underwriting their annual Snowflake Ball. The company has also participated in the Cow Parade in New York City which benefitted the charitable organisation God’s Love We Deliver, and The Trifecta Gala benefiting several charities and community organisations including the V Foundation for Cancer Research and the West End School. The company also has a partnership with the Virgil Abloh Post Modern Scholarship Fund. Baccarat has also collaborated with The National YoungArts Foundation, a charity established to identify and support high school artists in their educational and professional development.

Baccarat has also collaborated with The National YoungArts Foundation, a charity established to identify and support high school artists in their educational and professional development.

In May 2019, Baccarat and Woodford Reserve announced a limited edition American whiskey, Woodford Reserve Baccarat Edition.

During Miami Art Basel in 2019, Baccarat announced a collaboration with American designer Virgil Abloh, founder of Off-White and former artistic director of Louis Vuitton menswear.

In October 2019, American clothing brand Supreme announced a partnership with Baccarat.

In April 2021, the company appointed Margareth Henriquez, former CEO of Krug Champagne as its chief executive officer.

In October 2021, Baccarat debuted the 180th anniversary version of its Harcourt glass at Paris Fashion Week 2022 with designs by Yoshiki, Imane Ayissi, Charles de Vilmorin and others. The company has also participated in the Cow Parade in New York City which benefitted the charitable organisation God’s Love We Deliver.

In May 2023, Adam Banfield was appointed President & CEO of Baccarat's North America Operations.

In June 2023, Baccarat participated in the 76th Tony Awards creating the Baccarat Speakeasy in collaboration with Zacapa.

Greek tennis player Maria Sakkari and Italian tennis player Jannik Sinner participated in Baccarat’s inaugural Petit Slam at the Baccarat Hotel New York in August 2023.

In November 2023, Baccarat collaborated with American fashion designer Thom Browne.

2024 Pegasus World Cup Turf Invitational was presented by Baccarat at Gulfstream Park.

== Controversies ==
=== World War II ===
In 1940, The Baccarat factory collaborated with German troops, all Baccarat employees were expelled, and German troops transformed the factory into a POW transit camp which held 20,000 French prisoners. They continued working with alleged Nazi collaborators in the company upper rankings until as recently as 1992.

=== Discrimination ===
In a 1999 lawsuit, a jury found that Baccarat, Inc. discriminated against a Spanish-speaking worker.

In a 2017 lawsuit, Lawrence Young brought a civil rights action against Baccarat. Young asserted claims under the Americans With Disabilities Act (“ADA”), New York State and New York City Human Rights Law (“NYCHRL”) against Baccarat.

In 2020, Baccarat, Inc was forced to pay $100,000 to settle an EEOC Lawsuit for Race, Sexual Orientation and Disability Harassment. The EEOC had charged Baccarat with harassing a sales consultant at its Manhattan store based on race, sexual orientation, and disability.

=== Complaints ===
On 16 May 1991, the People of the State of California filed a complaint against Baccarat, Inc. for Civil Penalties and Injunctive relief. The complaint alleged that through the sale of leaded crystal decanters to consumers in California, Baccarat violated provisions of the Safe Drinking Water and Toxic Enforcement Act of 1986.

In May 2019, the Baccarat crystal factory had to pay 13,000 euros to 30 employees who were victims of asbestos exposure. In September 2019, the Baccarat crystal factory was found to be at fault for the death of a worker who died of cancer due to asbestos. In September 2020, the prejudice of anxiety was recognised for 264 former employees of the Baccarat crystal factory exposed to asbestos and they were awarded 9,000 euros each.

In 2021, Baccarat engaged in a trademark dispute with artist Kalliope Amorphous, which resulted in a social media controversy.
