= Eau Sauvage =

Perfume by Christian Dior

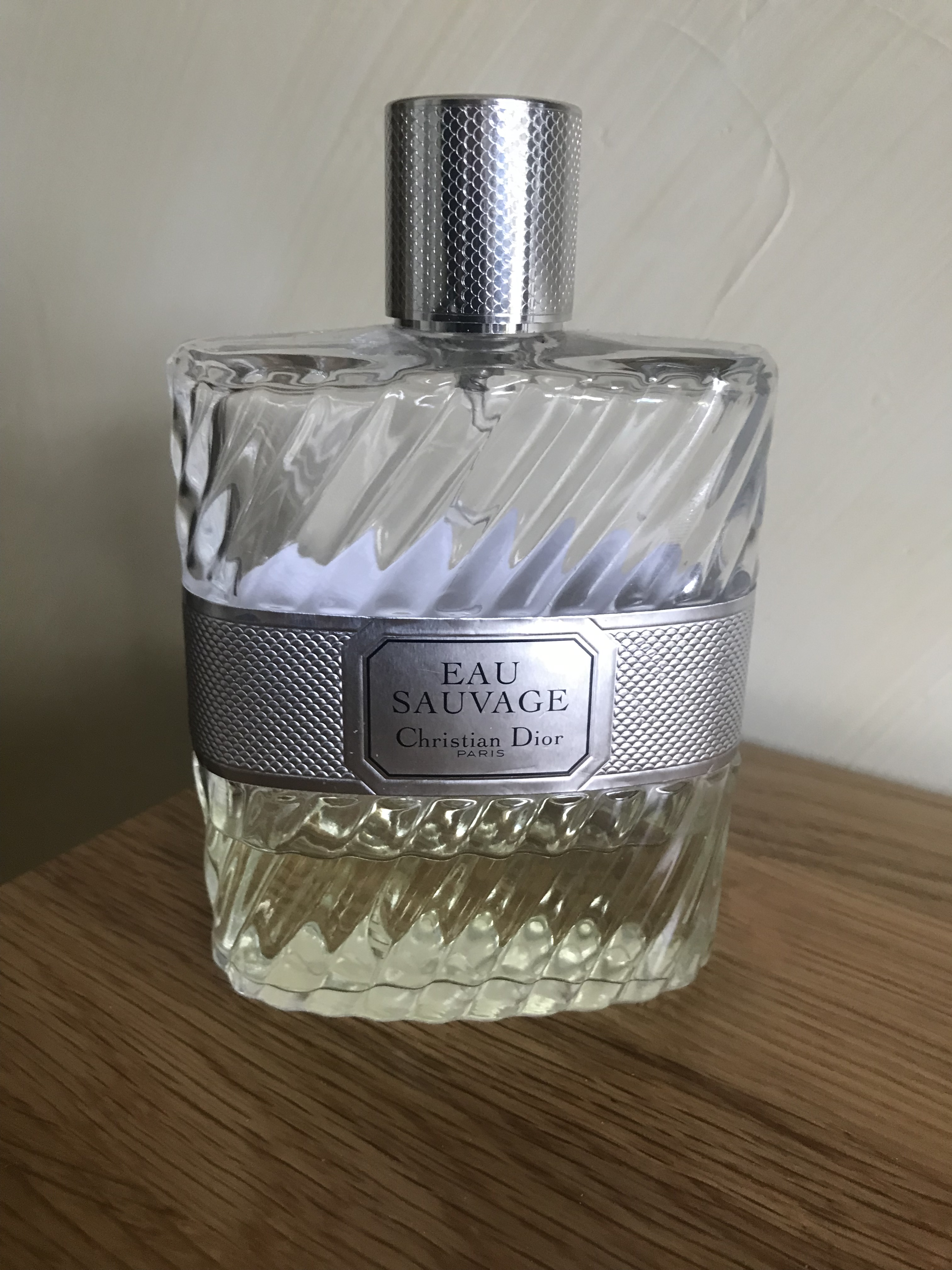

Fragrance by Christian Dior
- Released: 1966
- Label: Parfums Christian Dior

Eau Sauvage ('Savage Water') is a perfume for men produced by Parfums Christian Dior. It was created by perfumer Edmond Roudnitska and introduced in 1966 as Dior's first scent for men.

The name of the fragrance is reputedly the result of a late arrival by Christian Dior's friend Percy Savage to Dior's home. Dior had asked Savage to help find a name for a perfume for men. When Savage arrived, he was announced by Dior's butler as "Monsieur Sauvage"; the designer decided that "Oh, Sauvage" would be a fitting name.

On its release, advertisements featured French actor Alain Delon.

== Scent and notes ==
The "nose" behind the fragrance was Edmond Roudnitska. The top notes are lemon, bergamot, basil, rosemary, caraway and fruity notes; middle notes are jasmine, coriander, carnation, patchouli, orris root, sandalwood, rose, lavender and hedione; base notes are oak moss, vetiver, musk, and amber.
