= Edmond Roudnitska =

French master perfumer and author (1905–1996)

- Born: Edmond Fernand Eugène Roudnitska; 22 May 1905; Nice, France
- Died: 17 June 1996 (aged 91); Cabris, France
- Occupations: Perfumer; writer; fragrance historian
- Known for: Eau Sauvage and Diorissimo for Christian Dior; Femme for Rochas
- Spouse: Thérèse Delveaux
- Children: Edmond Roudnitska; Michel Roudnitska

Edmond Fernand Eugène Roudnitska (22 May 1905 – 17 June 1996) was a French master perfumer and author. He is known for creating perfumes such as Dior's Eau Sauvage and Diorissimo, and Rochas's Femme (launched into mass production in 1945). Many of his creations are still in production. He was the father of perfumer Michel Roudnitska.

In 1926, he started his training in perfumery in Grasse. In 1942, he met Thérèse Delveaux, who became his wife. In 1946, he founded Art et Parfum, a private lab for creating perfumes.

Diorissimo, based on lily of the valley, was a notable achievement in the field of perfumery. Unlike rose or jasmine, the smell of lily of the valley cannot be extracted from essential oil of the flower. Roudnitska circumvented the problem by using aroma chemicals like hydroxycitronellal.

== Perfumes ==
=== For Christian Dior ===
- Diorama (1949)
- Diorling (1951)
- Eau Fraîche (1955)
- Diorissimo (1956)
- Eau Sauvage (1966)
- Diorella (1972)
- Dior-Dior (1976)

=== For Elizabeth Arden ===
- It's You (1939)
- On Dit (1952)
- Elly (1955)
- Arden (1956)

=== For Hermès ===
- Eau d'Hermès (1951)
- Grande Eau d'Hermès (1987)
- Hermès Rouge (1988)

=== For Rochas ===
- Femme (1944)
- Mousseline (1946)
- Mouche (1947)
- Moustache (1949)
- La Rose (1949)

=== Other scents ===
- Le Parfum de Thérèse (early 1950s); rights acquired from Roudnitska's wife Thérèse (for whom it was originally created in the early 1950s) by Frédéric Malle, produced from 2000. One of the best chypres with its water fruit accord that was considered way too avant garde and ahead of its time.
- Ocean Rain Mario Valentino, a male fragrance for Mario Valentino (1990); Roudnitska's last creation
- Cristalle EDT for Chanel, with perfumer Henri Robert.

== Published works ==
- Le Parfum. Collection: Que sais-je?. Paris: Presses Universitaires de France - PUF, 1980 (5th edition 2000). ISBN 978-2-13-046057-2
- Odile Moréno, René Bourdon, Edmond Roudnitska (André Chastel, préface). L'Intimité du Parfum. Paris: Olivier Perrin, 1974. ISBN 978-2-85053-001-2
- Former les Hommes, Mythe ou Réalité?. Paris: Olivier Perrin, 1975. ASIN B0014MHB8W
- L'Esthétique en Question: Introduction à une Esthétique de l'Odorat. Paris: Presses Universitaires de France - PUF. ASIN B0014MG4VM
- Une Vie au Service du Parfum (essays beginning 1938 forward). Paris: Thérèse Vian, 1991. ISBN 2-908883-01-5
