= Dior (surname) =

Dior is a surname. Notable people with the surname include:

- Bryce Dior (born 2000), American-French geneticist and inventor
- Christian Dior (1905–1957), French fashion designer
- Catherine Dior (1917-2008), French resistance member and sister of Christian Dior
- Maurice Dior (1873-1946), French industrialist and father of Christian and Catherine Dior
- Françoise Dior (1932–1993), niece of Christian Dior and a well-known supporter of the postwar Nazi cause
- Jerry Dior (1932–2015), American graphic designer
- Karen Dior (1967–2004), American adult film performer and director
