= The New Look (TV series) =

American biographical drama television series

- Genre: Biographical; Drama
- Created by: Todd A. Kessler
- Starring: Ben Mendelsohn; Juliette Binoche; Maisie Williams; John Malkovich; Claes Bang; Zabou Breitman; Thure Lindhardt; Emily Mortimer; Charles Berling; Glenn Close
- Composer: James S. Levine
- Country of origin: United States
- Original language: English
- No. of seasons: 1
- No. of episodes: 10

Production
- Executive producers: Mark A. Baker; Lorenzo di Bonaventura; Todd A. Kessler
- Producer: Helen Shaver
- Running time: 36–61 minutes
- Production companies: DB-AK Pictures; Apple Studios

Original release
- Network: Apple TV+
- Release: February 14, 2024 – present

The New Look is an American biographical drama television series created by Todd A. Kessler that premiered on Apple TV+ on February 14, 2024.

== Plot ==
The series follows fashion designers Christian Dior and Coco Chanel through the World War II Nazi occupation of Paris and its aftermath.

== Cast and characters ==
=== Main ===
- Ben Mendelsohn as Christian Dior
- Juliette Binoche as Coco Chanel
- Maisie Williams as Catherine Dior
- John Malkovich as Lucien Lelong
- Claes Bang as Hans von Dincklage
- Zabou Breitman as Madame Zehnacker
- Thure Lindhardt as Heinrich Himmler
- Emily Mortimer as Elsa Lombardi (based on Vera Bate Lombardi)
- Charles Berling as Pierre Wertheimer
- Glenn Close as Carmel Snow

=== Recurring ===
- Nuno Lopes as Cristóbal Balenciaga
- Thomas Poitevin as Pierre Balmain
- Jannis Niewöhner as Walter Schellenberg
- David Kammenos as Jacques Benita
- Hugo Becker as Hervé des Charbonneries
- Darina Al Joundi as Madame Delahaye
- Joseph Olivennes as André Palasse
- Christopher Buchholz as Baron Vaufreland
- Michael Carter as Maurice Dior
- Eliott Margueron as Pierre Cardin
- Patrick Albenque as Marcel Boussac
- Frédéric Anscombre as René de Chambrun
- Quentin Faure as George Vigouroux
- Gaëtan Wenders as Jacob Friedman

=== Guest ===
- Axel Auriant as Guillaume
- Alexandre Willaume as Raoul Nordling
- Sagamore Stévenin as Pierre Reverdy
- Rupert Young as Malcolm Muggeridge
- Joséphine de La Baume as Arletty
- Olivia Ruiz as Édith Piaf
- Jérôme Robart as Paul Wertheimer
- Jonjo O'Neill as Bernard Dior
- Mathilde Warnier as Marie-Therese
- Alex Jennings as Raymond Dior
- Yves Heck as Personal perfumer

== Episodes ==
No.	Title	Directed by	Written by	Original release date
1	"Just You Wait and See"	Todd A. Kessler	Todd A. Kessler	February 14, 2024
2	"The Hour"	Todd A. Kessler	Todd A. Kessler	February 14, 2024
3	"Nothing but Blue Skies"	Helen Shaver	Dani Vetere and Todd A. Kessler & Jason Rabe	February 14, 2024
4	"What a Difference"	Helen Shaver	Ning Zhou and Todd A. Kessler & Jason Rabe	February 21, 2024
5	"Give Your Heart and Soul to Me"	Julia Ducournau	Ashlin Halfnight and Todd A. Kessler & Jason Rabe	February 28, 2024
6	"If You Believed in Me"	Julia Ducournau	Teleplay by : Todd A. Kessler & Jason Rabe; Story by : Todd A. Kessler & Jason Rabe and Matthew Fantaci	March 6, 2024
7	"It All Came True"	Helen Shaver	Teleplay by : Todd A. Kessler & Jason Rabe; Story by : Carter Harris and Matthew Fantaci	March 13, 2024
8	"I Love You Most of All"	Helen Shaver	Teleplay by : Amanda Coe; Story by : Carter Harris and Amanda Coe	March 20, 2024
9	"Will You Return"	Jeremy Podeswa	Teleplay by : Jason Rabe; Story by : Carter Harris and Jason Rabe	March 27, 2024
10	"What a Day This Has Been"	Jeremy Podeswa	Todd A. Kessler & Jason Rabe & David Rabe	April 3, 2024

== Production ==
It was announced in February 2022 that Apple TV+ had greenlit the project, which had the potential to become an anthology series. Todd A. Kessler was set to write, direct, and executive produce, with Ben Mendelsohn and Juliette Binoche starring. In May, Maisie Williams joined the cast, with John Malkovich, Emily Mortimer, and Claes Bang added in June.

Filming for the first season began by May 2022 in Paris.

The second season was set to begin filming in November 2023 before the 2023 SAG-AFTRA strike.

== Music ==
The New Look (Apple TV+ Original Series Soundtrack)

Soundtrack album by various artists
- Released: April 3, 2024
- Labels: Shadow of the City; Dirty Hit
- Producer: Jack Antonoff

Singles from The New Look (Apple TV+ Original Series Soundtrack)
- 1. "White Cliffs of Dover" Released: January 31, 2024; 2. "Now Is the Hour" Released: February 7, 2024

In November 2023, it was announced that Jack Antonoff would produce the soundtrack for The New Look, which consists of covers of popular songs from the early and mid-20th century. Scheduled to be released on April 3, 2024, the soundtrack album for the first season comprises 10 covers and will be the first release by Antonoff's Shadow of the City record label, under Dirty Hit. Florence and the Machine's cover of "The White Cliffs of Dover" was released as the first single on January 31, 2024. The second single, a cover of "Now Is the Hour" by the 1975 was released on February 7, 2024.

The New Look (Apple TV+ Original Series Soundtrack) track listing
No.	Title	Length
1.	"White Cliffs of Dover" (Florence and the Machine)	3:00
2.	"Now Is the Hour" (The 1975)	2:32
3.	"Blue Skies" (Lana Del Rey)	3:20
4.	"What a Difference a Day Makes" (Perfume Genius)	3:37
5.	"La Vie en rose" (Nick Cave)	3:55
6.	"It's Only a Paper Moon" (Beabadoobee)	2:26
7.	"I Wished on the Moon" (Joy Oladokun)	3:35
8.	"You Always Hurt the One You Love" (Bartees Strange)	3:23
9.	"I Cover the Waterfront" (Sam Dew)	3:17
10.	"Almost Like Being in Love" (Bleachers)	2:55
11.	"The New Look" (main title theme)	1:02

== Release ==
The series was released with the first three episodes on February 14, 2024, followed by one episode every Wednesday through April 3.

== Reception ==
On the review aggregator website Rotten Tomatoes, the series holds an approval rating of 59% based on 54 reviews, with an average rating of 6.5/10. The website's critics consensus reads, "The New Look benefits from impressive production values and a talented cast, even if they're often let down by a somewhat scattered story." On Metacritic, the series holds a weighted average score of 62 out of 100, based on 23 critics, indicating "generally favorable" reviews. Anita Singh of the Telegraph awarded the series three stars out of five, praising the show’s “sumptious” look but criticizing the decision to shoot in English.

=== Accolades ===
Award	Date of ceremony	Category	Nominee(s)	Result	Ref.
Astra TV Awards	August 18, 2024	Best Guest Actress in a Streaming Drama Series	Glenn Close	Nominated	
Primetime Creative Arts Emmy Awards	September 7–8, 2024	Outstanding Period Costumes for a Series	Karen Muller Serreau, Catherine Boisgontier, and Emmanuelle Pertus (for "What a Day This Has Been")	Nominated	
