= Dior (disambiguation) =

Dior is a French clothing retailer.

Dior may also refer to:

- Dior (surname)

== People with the given name ==
- Dior Angus (born 1994), English professional footballer
- Dior (singer) (born 1999), Malaysian singer

== Music ==
- "Dior" (Pop Smoke song), 2019
- "Dior" (MK song), 2025
- "Dior", a song by American rapper Moneybagg Yo on his 2019 album 43va Heartless

== Other uses ==
- Dior and I is a 2014 French documentary film
- Dior Eluchíl, a fictional character in J. R. R. Tolkien's legendarium, son of Lúthien and Beren

== See also ==
- Diores (disambiguation)
- Diors, a village in the Indre department of France
- Lat-Dior, a Damel (king) in nineteenth century Sénégal
- Iann Dior, an American rapper
