= Michael Carter (actor) =

Scottish actor (born 1947)

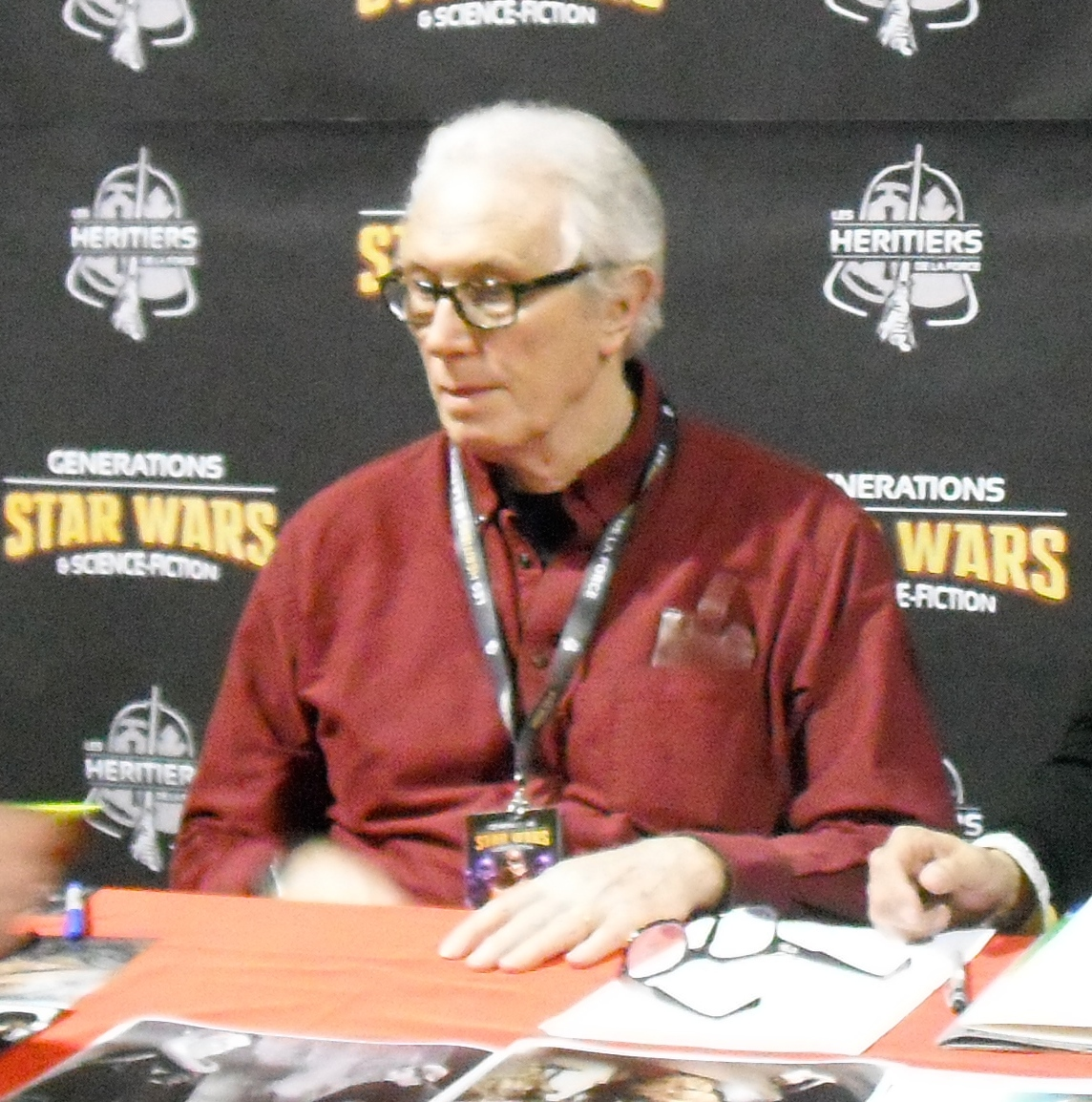
- Carter in 2015
- Born: 29 June 1947 (age 79); Dumfries, Dumfriesshire, Scotland
- Education: Royal Academy of Dramatic Art
- Occupations: Actor, writer
- Years active: 1971–present
- Known for: Return of the Jedi; An American Werewolf in London

Michael Carter (born 29 June 1947) is a Scottish actor of film, stage and television, known for portraying Gerald Bringsley in An American Werewolf in London (1981), Bib Fortuna in Star Wars: Return of the Jedi (1983), as Von Thurnburg in The Illusionist (2006), and as Jaehaerys I Targaryen in episode: "The Heirs of the Dragon" in House of the Dragon (2022).

Other credits include A Christmas Carol (1984), Taggart (1986 & 2005), One Man's War (1991), Civvies (1992), Rebus (2000–2007), Two Thousand Acres of Sky (2001–2003), Casualty (2005), Spooks (2006), Attack Force (2006), Centurion (2010), Hunted (2012), The Halcyon (2017), The New Look (2023), and Death by Lightning (2025).

== Early life ==
Michael Carter was born 29 June 1947, and brought up in Dumfries, Scotland, and educated at Dumfries Academy, where he was goalkeeper in the school football team. He trained at the Royal Academy of Dramatic Arts (RADA) in London, graduating in 1969.

== Career ==
=== Early work ===
Carter's earliest television role was playing a UNIT soldier and a prisoner in The Mind of Evil (1971), in Doctor Who. He made his film debut as London Underground passenger Gerald Bringsley who is killed by the werewolf in An American Werewolf in London (1981).

=== Star Wars ===
In 1983, Carter portrayed Bib Fortuna in Return of the Jedi (1983) he had come to the attention of casting director Mary Selway, who saw him perform in a musical in the West End theatre section of London in the early 1980s. Director Richard Marquand had also seen and enjoyed Carter's theater work, and wanted to cast him as Fortuna; Marquand, who described Carter as a "terrific actor", was drawn to him for the role because he wanted Fortuna to be very tall, and Carter was about six feet tall. Marquand invited Carter to meet at a studio in Elstree Studios to discuss a role he was casting in a film, which Marquand would only identify by its fake working title Blue Harvest. Carter was performing on a television series at the time. Carter's train was late and Marquand was in a meeting when he arrived, and the front desk forgot to inform Marquand that he arrived, so Carter waited for an hour without being called in. Marquand happened upon Carter as he was leaving for the day, and the meeting took place. During the 30-minute meeting, Marquand informed him the part was an alien in a science-fiction film, also describing it as a children's film, and that Carter could have the role without auditioning if he wanted it, but Marquand could not discuss any details about the character or film because it was a "top secret Hollywood movie". Carter was initially not sure the part interested him, but Marquand persisted, and Carter reluctantly agreed. Only then did Marquand reveal that it was a Star Wars film. Carter was sworn to secrecy about the role, but he told his family about the part anyway, and the next day his daughter discussed it publicly with a friend at her school.

Carter had never seen the original Star Wars film, and had only seen the sequel, The Empire Strikes Back, because he was working at the time in a theater production with Anthony Daniels, who played C-3PO in the film. Carter spent three months undergoing extensive makeup casts and tests for the character at Elstree Studios before shooting began. Molds were made from his hands and head. Several foam appliances were sculpted to conform to Carter's face, and molds were made and cast into foam latex, which were then trimmed and carefully glued to the actor's face. It took about eight-and-a-half hours to apply the makeup to Carter the first time, though the process was eventually reduced to slightly under an hour. Carter had been told a great deal of makeup would be involved with the part, but he said, "I did not know what I was letting myself in for when it came to having to wear so much makeup. It did come as a bit of a shock."

Following his appearance in Return of the Jedi, Carter was offered several alien roles or parts that involved heavy amounts of prosthetics. For example, he was cast in the role of Radu Molasar, a monster and warlord in the Michael Mann film The Keep (1983), as a direct result of his work in Return of the Jedi. Carter has continued to receive letters and autograph requests from Star Wars fans for decades after the film's release, and he has made appearances at sci-fi and fantasy conventions. Carter was offered the opportunity to reprise the role of Bib Fortuna in the prequel The Phantom Menace, but he declined due to the rigors associated with the makeup application.

=== Other roles ===
On stage Carter has appeared at the National Theatre, in the West End, and in Broadway theatre. He co-wrote the 1991 film One Man's War starring Anthony Hopkins.

His appearances on television include Rebus with both John Hannah and Ken Stott, and Taggart. He starred as the polygynist husband of Brenda Fricker and Josette Simon in the 1992 TV mini-series Seekers, and as Tulloch, head of the Helicopter Emergency Medical Service in Thames TV's seven part series Call Red. He also portrayed King Jaehaerys I Targaryen in the HBO fantasy series House of the Dragon (2022).

== Filmography ==
=== Film ===
Year	Title	Role	Notes
1981	An American Werewolf in London	Gerald Bringsley	
1982	The Draughtsman's Contract	Mr Clarke	Credited as Mike Carter
1983	Return of the Jedi	Bib Fortuna	
1983	The Keep	Radu Molasar	
1985	Out of the Darkness	Julian Reid	
2003	Young Adam	Prosecutor	
2006	The Illusionist	Von Thurnburg	
2006	Attack Force	Admiral Morgan	
2010	Centurion	General Antoninus	
2023	Falling Into Place	John	

=== Television ===
Year	Title	Role	Notes
1971	Doctor Who	Prisoner/UNIT Soldier	Episodes: "The Mind of Evil", Uncredited
1982	Nobody's Hero	Dodge	5 episodes
1982	Saturday Night Thriller	Ringer	Episode: "Grass"
1983	Heather Ann	Geoffrey	TV movie
1983	Agatha Christie's Partners in Crime	Rodriguez	Episode: "The Ambassador's Boots"
1984	A Christmas Carol	Ghost of Christmas Yet to Come	TV movie
1986–2005	Taggart	Jack Stobo/Sandy Russell	2 episodes
1991	One Man's War		TV movie Writer Only
1992	Civvies	Arnie	4 episodes
1993	The Chief	Thomas Setter	Episode: "The Trust of Justice"
1993	The Bill	Ronnie Gurman	Episode: "Soft Touch"
1994	How High the Moon		Miniseries
1995	The Tales of Para Handy	Rankin	Episode: "Para Handy's Piper"
1996	Call Red	Philip Tulloch	
1999	C15: The New Professionals	Superintendent	Episode: "Hostage"
2000–07	Rebus	Rev John Carson/Joe Toal	2 episodes
2001–03	Two Thousand Acres of Sky	Douglas Raeburn	13 episodes
2003	Seven Wonders of the Industrial World	John Scott Russell	Episode: "The Great Ship"
2004	Red Cap	Maj. Gen. Guy Walpole	Episode: "Betrayed"
2004	Rosemary & Thyme	Professor Reeves	Episode: "Swords into Ploughshares"
2005	Casualty	Michael de Fraine	4 episodes
2006	Spooks	Sir Maurice Clark	Series 5 episode 10, Also known as MI-5
2012	Hunted	Vincent Cage	Episode: "Kismet"
2017	The Halcyon	Wilfred Reynolds	
2022	House of the Dragon	Jaehaerys I Targaryen	Episode: "The Heirs of the Dragon"
2023	The New Look	Maurice Dior	
2025	Death by Lightning	James Frederick Joy	

=== Video games ===
Year	Title	Role
2009	Demon's Souls	Biorr of the Twin Fangs; Blacksmith Boldwin; Blacksmith Ed
2011	Dark Souls	Hawkeye Gough
