= Françoise Dior =

French socialite (1932–1993)

- Dior and Colin Jordan on their wedding day (1963)
- Born: Marie Françoise Suzanne Dior; 7 April 1932; Paris, France
- Died: 20 January 1993 (aged 60); Neuilly sur Seine, France
- Other names: Françoise de Caumont La Force; Françoise Dior-Jordan; Françoise Dior-de Mirleau
- Known for: Heiress, post-war neo-Nazi underground financier
- Spouses: Robert-Henri Nompar, Comte de Caumont La Force (m. 1955; div. 1960); Colin Jordan (m. 1963; div. 1967); Comte Hubert de Mirleau (m. 1983)
- Children: 1
- Relatives: Maurice Dior (paternal grandfather); Madeleine Dior (paternal grandmother); Christian Dior (paternal uncle); Catherine Dior (paternal aunt)

Marie Françoise Suzanne Dior (7 April 1932 – 20 January 1993) was a French socialite and neo-Nazi underground financier. She was the niece of French fashion designer Christian Dior and Resistance fighter Catherine Dior, who publicly distanced herself from her niece after she married British neo-Nazi activist Colin Jordan in 1963. She was a close friend of Savitri Devi.

== Early life and family ==
Marie Françoise Suzanne Dior was born on 7 April 1932, the daughter of Madeline Leblanc and Raymond Dior, a left-wing journalist and the brother of French couturier Christian Dior and Resistance fighter Catherine Dior. Her father Raymond, who had been employed at the family business headquarters in Paris for some years, was a Communist International sympathizer, to the despair of his own father Maurice Dior, a fertilizer industrialist. Raymond was involved with the satirical gazette Le Crapouillot and embraced radical ideas, advocating the '200 families' conspiracy theory, that is the belief that 200 French industrial and financial families are responsible, in his own words, "for all the ills of the land". Raymond was bisexual, and scholar Graham Macklin notes that Françoise's biological father could have been Valentin de Balla, a Hungarian nobleman.

Dior's attraction to Nazism emerged in her childhood, during the Nazi occupation of France. According to historian Nicholas Goodrick-Clarke, "one of the sweetest memories" of Dior was the compliment "What a beautiful little Aryan girl" made to her by an SS-man in Paris. She was initially a fervent royalist and took an interest in the study of pre-Revolutionary France. Dior came to believe that the ideals of the French Revolution were in reality a cover for a global conspiracy led by international elites whose aim was national degeneracy.

On 27 April 1955, Dior married Count Robert-Henri de Caumont-la-Force, a Grimaldi descendant of Prince of Monaco Honoré III, with whom she had a daughter.

== World Union of National Socialists ==
Dior came to be disappointed by traditional aristocracy and her marriage turned out to be unhappy. The couple divorced in 1960. Having heard in the press of the Trafalgar Square rally held by British neo-Nazi activist Colin Jordan, she travelled to England in the summer of 1962 and became a frequent visitor of the London headquarters of the National Socialist Movement (NSM), a neo-Nazi organisation led by Jordan. The latter began courting Dior and introduced her to Savitri Devi; Dior and Devi became close friends from that moment.

Dior used her fortune and social network to support the creation of the French chapter of the World Union of National Socialists (WUNS), an Anglo-American neo-Nazi organisation established by Jordan and George Lincoln Rockwell at the Cotswold Camp in August 1962. Upon her return to France, she began to head the national section of the WUNS. Dior brought former Waffen SS officer Claude Jeanne to the movement, who founded the West European Federation (FOE) in 1963 – a WUNS branch encompassing France, Belgium, Luxembourg, the Spanish Basque Country and Romandy. However, her success in recruiting former high-ranking Nazis and members of the social elite turned out to be limited. By the time the police dissolved the FOE in May 1964, the group had only 42 members, most of them social misfits.

== Marriage to Colin Jordan ==
While Jordan was imprisoned following a 1962 conviction for establishing a paramilitary group, Dior became engaged for around a month in June 1963 to another NSM member and friend of Jordan, John Tyndall. That event contributed to a growing feud between the two allies, which led to a split within the NSM in 1964. Upon Jordan's release, however, Dior chose to marry him instead. Jordan proposed to her in September 1963 during a flight to Britain; his relationship with Dior soon took priority over the movement.

After a civil ceremony held in Coventry on 5 October 1963, where demonstrators hurled rotten eggs and apples at the couple as they gave the Nazi salute, Dior and Jordan had a second wedding on 6 October at the NSM headquarters in London. The photographs and newsreel footage of the ceremony – illustrating them mingling blood after cutting their ring fingers with a dagger before letting a "unity drop" fall over an open copy of Mein Kampf – were published widely by the press. The guests gave the Hitler salute and the "Horst-Wessel-Lied" was played. Dior also stated, "All I want is little Nazi children." Dior's mother rejected the marriage, saying, "We want to have as little to do with this sad affair", and adding that she would not allow Jordan into her home. Following the media coverage of the events, her aunt Catherine Dior, a Ravensbrück concentration camp survivor, issued a press release denouncing "the publicity given by the press and television to [her] niece Françoise Dior's nonsensical statements. The fame of [her] brother Christian Dior must not be used to highlight the scandal and risk tarnishing a name carried with honor and patriotism by members of my family." Savitri Devi was unable to attend the wedding; she had been banned from Britain following the Cotswold founding camp of the WUNS in 1962.

Only three months after her wedding to Jordan, the couple separated, again attracting sensational coverage in the press. Dior-Jordan, as she was by then calling herself, was rapidly disillusioned by her husband's leadership qualities and publicly dismissed him as a "middle-class nobody". The Daily Mirror ran a front-page headline reading, "Nazi Told: 'Marriage is Over'", with the subheading "You're no Leader, says Françoise". The next day, the paper ran another story with the headline "Please – I love you says Führer", quoting Jordan as he reportedly begged Dior to "please, please, please come home". Dior and Jordan reconciled once she was convinced of his ability to lead the NSM, which had proven to easily fall into factionalism.

== Arrests ==
Dior remained influential within the NSM in London. On 31 July 1965, she was involved in an arson committed by six NSM members against the Ilford and Lea Bridge Road synagogues. Dior was also the official WUNS representative in France by that year. On 4 June 1965, she was convicted in absentia to a 4-month jail sentence for having displayed neo-Nazi leaflets on the walls of the British embassy in Paris on a previous occasion. Dior then returned to France, where she was arrested in Nice on 4 October 1966 and held in custody for the Paris event.

She was released in February 1967, then eloped to Jersey with her new lover, Terence Cooper, whom she had met at the NSM. The couple soon relocated to Normandy, where they were visited by Savitri Devi, then reappeared in the summer of 1967 in a council house of Dagenham, East London rented by Cooper's family. Both of them had been expelled from the NSM at this point. Dior was questioned by the police and charged with inciting NSM members to set fire to the synagogues in London two years earlier. She received an 18-month jail sentence in January 1968 and was sent to Holloway Prison. While in jail, Dior was nicknamed "Nazi Nell" by the other inmates. Jordan divorced his wife in October 1967 on grounds of adultery with Cooper.

In 1969 Dior entered in contact with French neo-Nazi Mark Fredriksen and the FANE to create an antisemitic movement called the Front Uni Antisioniste ('Anti-Zionist United Front'). A meeting was held on 6 February 1969 with Dior, Fredriksen, Henry Coston and Pierre Sidos in order to organise the fight against "Jewish influence and Zionist propaganda", but the organisation never came to light. In October 1970 Dior invited Savitri Devi to stay in her home in Ducey, Normandy. Devi spent 9 months there, working on her memoirs; then returned to New Delhi in August 1971.

== Later life and death ==
Cooper and Dior lived together in Ducey, Normandy, in a home that had been a former presbytery, from August 1970 until July 1980, when their relationship ended. By the early 1980s, Dior was financially ruined after a bad investment in a Parisian nightclub, and she had to sell the home in 1982.

She joined the mainstream right-wing Rally for the Republic (R.P.R.) and married in 1983 Count Hubert de Mirleau. A leading member of French ethnonationalist think tank GRECE, de Mirleau belonged to one of France's oldest noble houses – although he was not particularly wealthy. He later joined the far-right Front National in 1985.

When British fascist Martin Webster started his short-lived group Our Nation following his expulsion from the National Front in December 1983, Dior allegedly paid some of his legal expenses.

She died of lung cancer on 20 January 1993 in the American Hospital of Neuilly-sur-Seine, aged 60.

In his 2013 autobiographical account of the relationship, entitled Death by Dior, Terry Cooper, her partner for 13 years, states that Françoise had incestuous relations with her daughter Christiane, who committed suicide in 1978. Cooper also claims in his book that Françoise was responsible for Christiane's death: after becoming displeased with her daughter, Dior allegedly "brainwashed" her into committing suicide.
