= Cyberbully (disambiguation) =

A cyberbully is a person who engages in cyberbullying.

Cyberbully may also refer to:

- Cyberbully (2011 film), an American television film
- Cyberbully (2015 film), a British television film
- Cyberbully Mom Club, an American emo band active from 2014 to 2017
