= Maisie Williams =

British actress (born 1997)

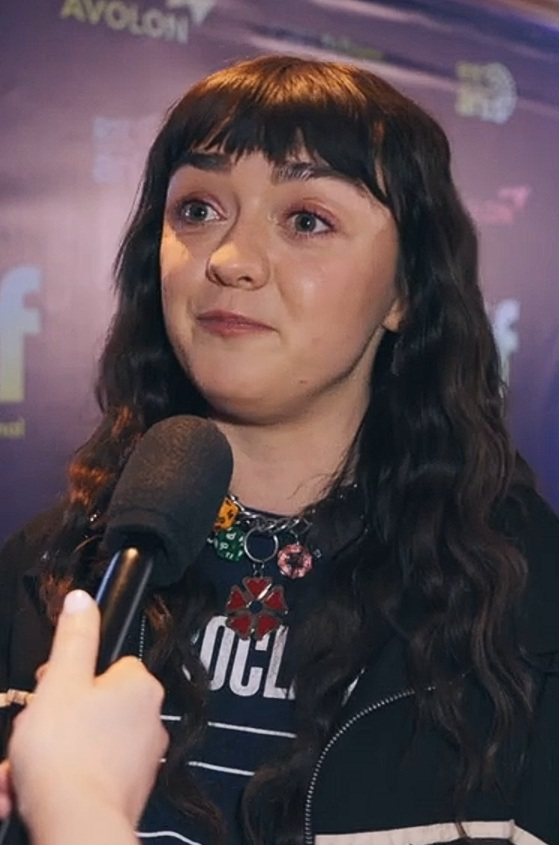
- Williams at Dublin International Film Festival 2026
- Born: Margaret Constance Williams; 15 April 1997 (age 29); Bristol, England
- Occupation: Actress
- Years active: 2011–present
- Known for: Game of Thrones (2011–2019)

Margaret Constance Williams (born 15 April 1997) is an English actress. Williams made her acting debut in 2011 as Arya Stark, a lead character in the HBO epic medieval fantasy television series Game of Thrones (2011–2019). She gained recognition and critical praise for her work on the show and received two Emmy Award nominations. Williams' other television appearances include Ashildr in the BBC science fiction series Doctor Who (2015), starring in the British docudrama television film Cyberbully (2015), and in the British science-fiction teen thriller film iBoy (2017). She played the central character in the comedy action drama miniseries Two Weeks to Live (2020), and portrayed punk rock icon Jordan in Pistol (2022), a biopic about the Sex Pistols. Williams also voiced Cammie MacCloud in the American animated web series Gen:Lock (2019–2021).

In 2014, she starred as Lydia in her first feature film, the coming-of-age mystery drama The Falling, for which she received critical acclaim and several awards. She co-starred in films such as the romantic period-drama film Mary Shelley (2017), the animated prehistoric sports comedy film Early Man (2018), and the romantic comedy-drama film Then Came You (2018). In 2018, she made her stage debut in Lauren Gunderson's play I and You at the Hampstead Theatre in London, to positive reviews. In 2020, she starred in the superhero horror film The New Mutants and the psychological thriller The Owners.

In 2019, Williams jointly developed and launched the social media platform Daisie, a multi-media networking app designed to be an alternative means to help artists and creators (especially those who are trying to get started) in their careers.

== Early life and education ==
Margaret Constance Williams was born in Bristol, England, on 15 April 1997 to Gary Williams and Hilary Frances (née Pitt), a university course administrator who later gave up her job to support her daughter's acting career. Williams’s parents divorced when she was four months old. The youngest of four siblings—James, Beth, and Ted—Williams was raised by her mother and stepfather in a three-bedroom council house in the village of Clutton, Somerset. Williams has been known as "Maisie" from an early age, (Note: a diminutive of Margaret which is used most frequently in Scotland.) nicknamed because of her perceived likeness to the cartoon character from the UK newspaper comic strip The Perishers.

Williams went to Clutton Primary School and Norton Hill School in Midsomer Norton. Maisie joined Sue Hill Dance in Radstock and became a very active dancer, taking part in many events. She later transferred to BDC Bath Dance College in Radstock to study performing arts, where she trained in musical theatre, ballet, pointe, tap, street, freestyle, gymnastics, and trampolining, with the ambition of becoming a professional dancer. She left school at 14 years old, partly due to the successful start of her acting career. She was then home educated, but did not take any GCSEs.

== Career ==
=== 2011–2019: Breakthrough with Game of Thrones ===
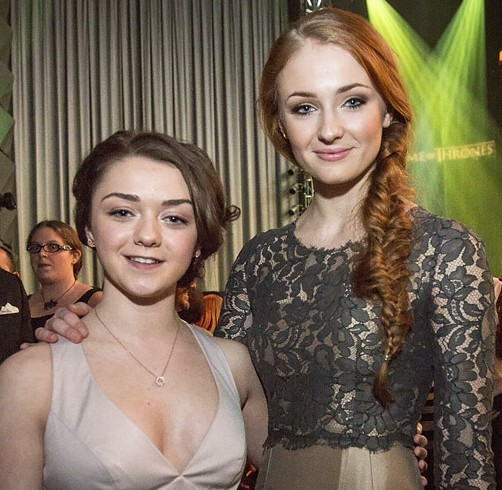
Williams (left) with Game of Thrones co-star Sophie Turner in 2013

At age 13, Williams began her professional acting career by co-starring in one of the largest ensemble casts on television. She was cast as Arya Stark, the feisty young daughter of a noble family in HBO's historical fantasy drama series Game of Thrones (based on George R. R. Martin's A Song of Ice and Fire epic fantasy novel series). Williams almost missed the audition (her second in her career) because it coincided with a school trip to a farm; her mother convinced her to go to the audition. As the series viewership rose, the international popularity of Game of Thrones gave Williams global recognition.

The character of Arya Stark is regarded as an anti heroine, a fan favourite that developed into one of the central protagonists in the Game of Thrones fantasy epic. The character's story arc across the first six seasons encompasses severance, trauma, tragedy and revenge. The physical role required a young actor who could portray a deadly assassin. Williams, who is naturally right-handed but kept in character by performing left handed in the show, did the majority of her own stunts and fight scenes in the series. She was told a year before the filming of "The Long Night" to build up her stamina for the episode. Her performance in that episode was nominated for the 2020 BAFTA TV Awards under the "Must-see moment" category. Williams appeared in all eight broadcast seasons of Game of Thrones, the final episode of which aired in May 2019.

Williams has said that while she looks back at her role as Arya with pride and affection she did not miss that period of her personal life. Arya was not only younger than Williams was, but the role demanded that she was made to look boyish with short hair and make up, plus a strap across her chest that made Williams feel ashamed during her mid teen years as her feminine body developed. The character did not match who she was becoming in reality nor did Arya resemble what Williams believed to be attractive, and at the same time she resented her own body for not matching that of her character.

Williams received critical praise and recognition for her portrayal of Arya in the show. In 2012, the second year of her professional acting career, she was submitted in the category of Outstanding Supporting Actress for the 64th Primetime Emmy Awards by HBO, but did not make the nomination shortlist. She was awarded both the 2012 Portal Award for Best Young Actor and the Portal Award for Best Supporting Actress – Television (at 15 years, the youngest actress to achieve this). In 2012, Williams portrayed Loren Caleigh in the three part BBC supernatural thriller series The Secret of Crickley Hall. Williams took part in The Olympic Ticket Scalper, a Funny or Die skit. She also appeared in the independent film Heatstroke (2012), and the short film Up on the Roof (2013).

In November 2013, she received the BBC Radio 1 Teen Award for Best British Actor. August 2014 she was presented with "Best Supporting Actress, Drama" in the EWwy Awards. In 2014, Williams played the lead role of Lydia in the British melodramatic coming of age mystery film drama The Falling, set in an all-girls school, for which she was awarded the London Film Critics' Circle Award for Young Performer of the Year, Evening Standard British Film Award Rising Star and the European Shooting Stars Award at the 65th Berlin International Film Festival for her role in Carol Morley's feature. The film premiered at the BFI London Film Festival on 11 October 2014, and was released theatrically on 24 April 2015 in the UK. Guy Lodge of Variety described Williams as "prodigiously gifted" and giving a "brilliantly articulated ... bristling, often spikily funny performance." In 2014, she also played Abbie in the Irish comedy-drama film Gold.

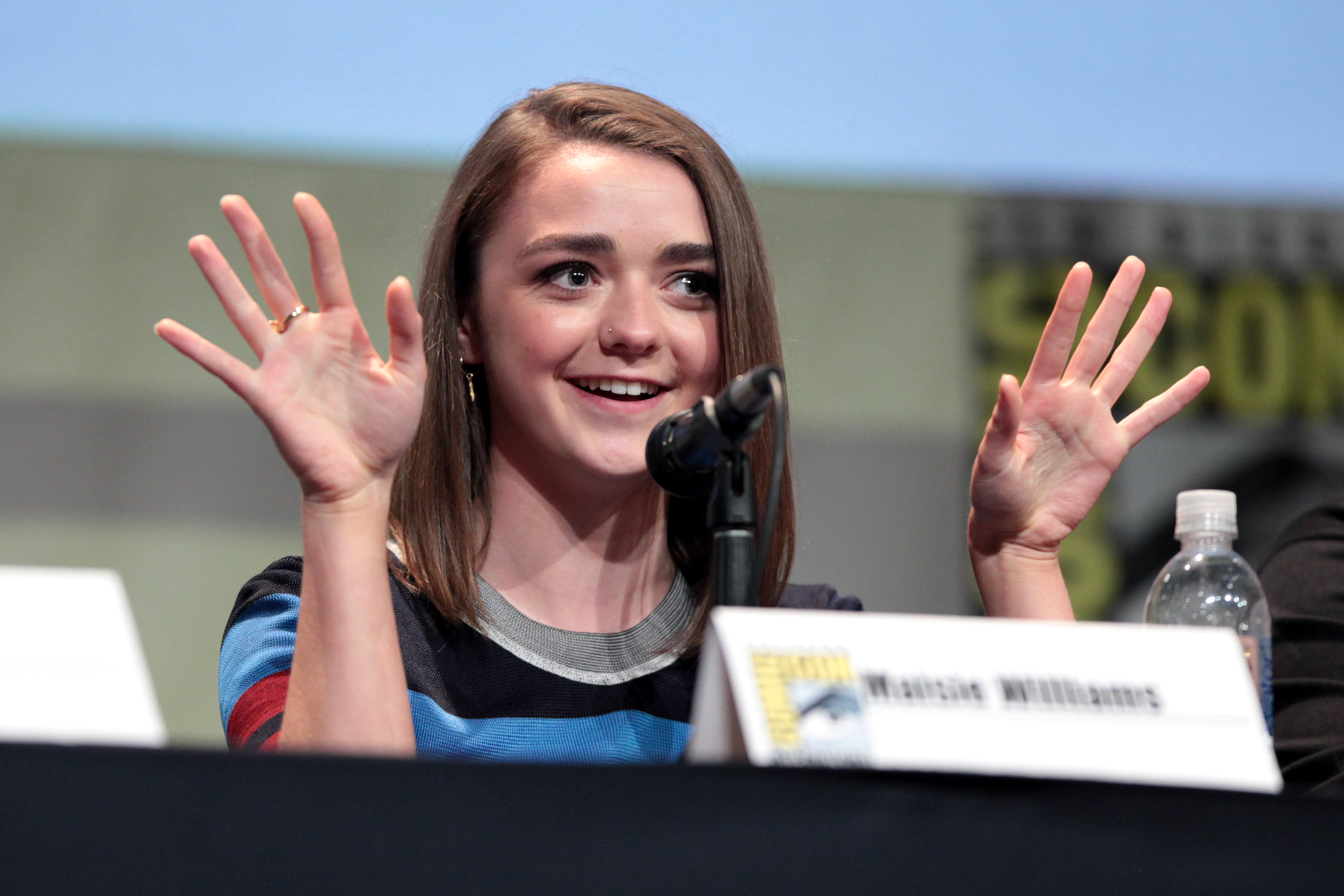
Williams at the 2015 San Diego Comic-Con

In 2015, she was awarded the Empire Hero Award, and the Saturn Award for Best Performance by a Young Actor in a Television Series. In January 2015, Williams (a victim of cyberbullying herself) starred as Casey Jacobs in the one-hour-long BAFTA nominated Cyberbully, a Channel 4 docudrama television film. Writing for The Guardian, Filipa Jodelka described Williams' central, almost solo, performance as a "tour-de-force". In 2015, Williams guest starred in four episodes of series 9 of the BBC science fiction series Doctor Who ("The Girl Who Died", "The Woman Who Lived", "Face the Raven" and "Hell Bent"), in the recurring role of Ashildr, a Viking girl made immortal by the Doctor. Williams' performance in "The Woman Who Lived" was described as "superb" by Patrick Mulkern of the Radio Times. In 2016 she reached the nomination short list for a Primetime Emmy Award for Outstanding Supporting Actress in a Drama Series. In 2018 Williams was nominated for the Best Performance in a Show in the MTV Movie & TV Awards. In 2019 her performance in the final season of the drama resulted in her again receiving the Saturn Award for Best Performance by a Younger Actor in a Television Series, as well as nominations for the Best Hero and Best Fight in the MTV Movie & TV Awards and People's Choice Awards for The Female TV Star and The Drama TV Star. In the same year Williams achieved her second nomination for a Primetime Emmy Award for Outstanding Supporting Actress in a Drama Series, Daniel D'Addario from Variety said that Williams "entered the show as a child with minimal experience, but swiftly proved herself a very gifted performer... Millions watched her grow into her talents – and a fitting end to her very unusual journey through her first role" would be for her to win an Emmy.

In 2017, Williams starred, alongside Bill Milner, as Lucy in the Netflix science fiction teen superhero thriller film iBoy. Tristram Fane Saunders of the Daily Telegraph wrote that she brought "depth, humour and honesty to the role." Also in 2017, Williams appeared as Isabel Baxter in Mary Shelley a romantic period-drama film directed by Haifaa al-Mansour and written by Emma Jensen. In 2018, she voiced the character Goona, a Bronze Age fearless rebel tomboy football enthusiast in Nick Park's animated prehistoric comedy sports film Early Man which also featured Eddie Redmayne and Tom Hiddleston, though both Gwilym Mumford of The Guardian and Kate Stables of the British Film Institute noted that Williams' accent varied during the film. From 18 October to 24 November 2018, Williams starred as Caroline in the stage play I and You, which was written by Lauren Gunderson. The play premiered at the Hampstead Theatre in London. The play did well at the box office and Williams' stage performance was regarded a critical success, with the production later being broadcast free on Instagram from 30 November to 3 December 2018 and again during the last week of March 2020. She also starred in the eleven-minute short film Corvidae, a dark fairy tale filmed in 2013 and released in 2018, of which Craig Holton of flickfeast commented that Williams brought "an undeniably ethereal quality to this short film, helping it make the leap from grounded realism to eldritch bucolic fantasy".

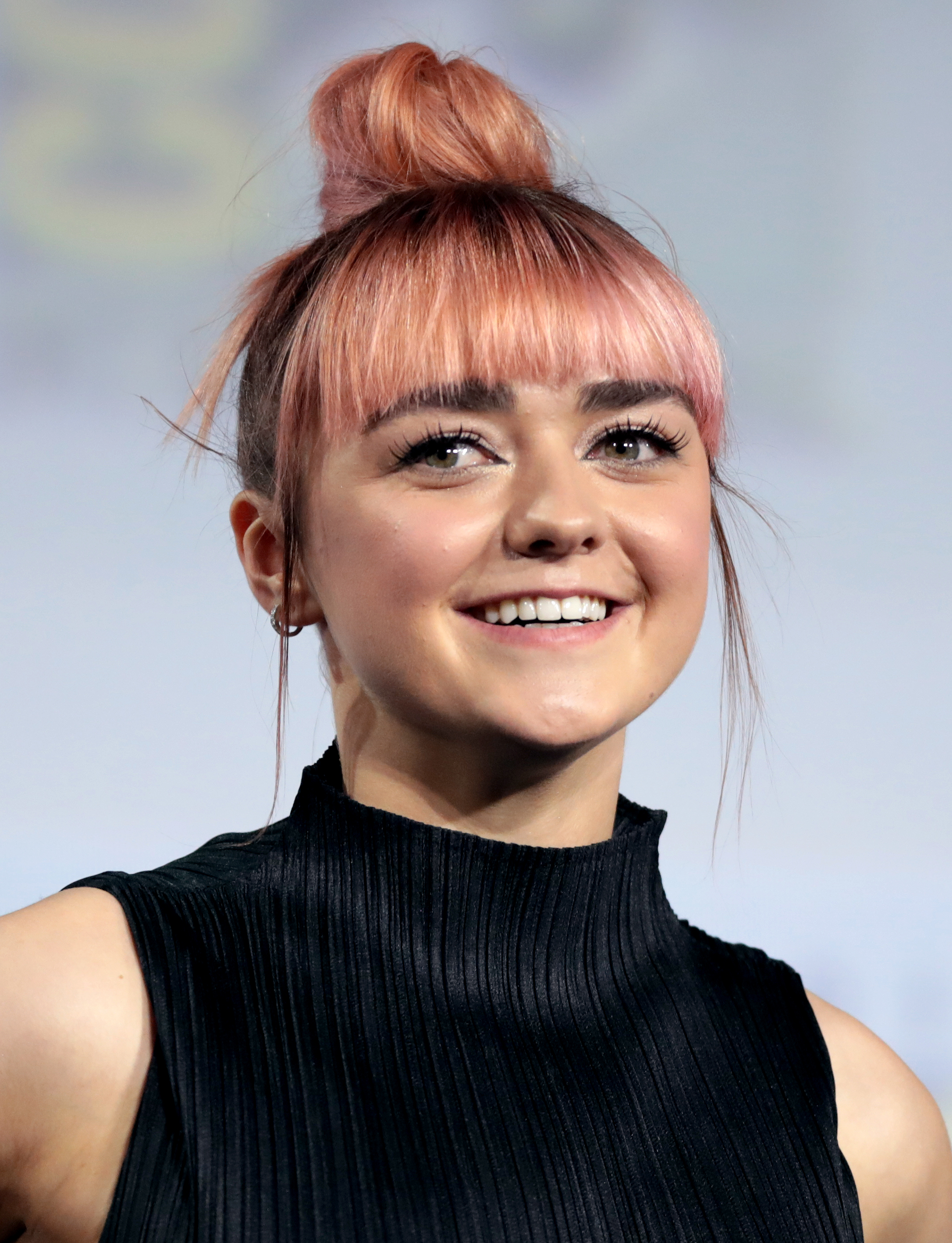
Williams in 2019

In 2019, Williams starred alongside Asa Butterfield and Nina Dobrev in the coming of age romantic comedy-drama film Then Came You, in which she played a teenager with a terminal illness. Frank Scheck of the Hollywood Reporter felt that Williams made her "sprightly character appealingly vulnerable". The film premiered at the Woodstock Film Festival on 12 October 2018 and was released nationwide in 2019. From 2019 to 2021 Williams has voiced the role Cammie MacCloud, a mischievous Scottish hacker, in the U.S. animated web series Gen:Lock that is set in a dystopian future, which is broadcast on the Rooster Teeth subscription service. On 4 November 2021, the second season of nine episodes premiered on HBO Max first before it is released on Rooster Teeth three months later.

=== 2020–present ===
Originally set for release in April 2018, in late August 2020, Williams co-starred in the delayed Disney/Fox superhero horror film The New Mutants. The New York Times said Williams portrayed the Marvel superhero Rahne Sinclair / Wolfsbane—a Scottish mutant who can turn into a wolf, but struggles to reconcile this with her religious beliefs -- "with endearing sincerity". Though the film received mixed to negative reviews her performance was regarded as good by The Hollywood Reporter, including adding "layers of panache and emotion" to her character. The film was released in "in theatres" which were partly open, with reduced capacity, due to the worldwide COVID-19 pandemic, in August 2020 (despite many other major Disney films being further delayed). Written and directed by Josh Boone, the film also stars Anya Taylor-Joy, Blu Hunt, Charlie Heaton, Alice Braga, and Henry Zaga. The Los Angeles Times described the same sex romantic relationship between Williams' Rahne and Hunt's Danielle Moonstar as feeling honest and a central part of the story that grounded the film with "a sense of humanity", which also made The New Mutants both a rare LGBTQ inclusive superhero film and groundbreaking for a Disney release.

Released in September 2020, Williams was the lead in Two Weeks to Live, a six-part dark, deadpan comedy revenge drama. Williams plays Kim Noakes, who (following the murder of her father) has been raised in total isolation, living off the grid in the wilderness, by her overprotective doomsday prepping badass survivalist mother, Tina (played by Sian Clifford). Action is set in motion following a seemingly harmless prank played on Kim of a fake video that makes her believe that everybody in the world has just two weeks to live. Kim – raised to believe the end times were close – sets off to kill the man who murdered her father in front of her when she was a child. The Guardian considers that Williams "excels in her fish-out-of-water role, flitting between hapless and determined, worldly and childlike". Two Weeks To Live lets Williams flex comedy muscles while also showing off her stunt fighting and stunt skills. The NME described the action drama as also genuinely funny. The UK series, written by Gaby Hull and produced by Kudos for Sky UK, debuted on 2 September 2020, and premiered in the U.S. on HBO Max on 5 November. The six part first series also starred Sean Knopp, Mawaan Rizwan and Taheen Modak.

Also in September, Williams starred in the 1990s-set psychological thriller The Owners, in which she played Mary, a young woman who reluctantly agrees to participate in a botched robbery with her boyfriend and two other young low level criminals (Ian Kenny, Jake Curran and Andrew Ellis) of an old couple's home (Sylvester McCoy and Rita Tushingham). The Hollywood Reporter, while praising McCoy and Tushingham more, felt that Williams 'used her innate appeal to make her character sympathetic'. Dread Central felt that she gave better performance than she did in The New Mutants and commented "it's undeniably cool to see the young, now forever iconic actress kick ass in a real world setting". The film was released by RLJE Films at select theatres, and digital on demand on 4 September. The film was directed by French director Julius Berg and adapted from the graphic novel Une Nuit De Pleine Lune by Belgian artist Hermann and writer Yves H. Her veteran co-actor Sylvester McCoy predicted success for Williams beyond acting "she's full of energy – a little bubbly ball of fire and creativity... she's grown up in the business and she knows it inside out... She's a rising star as an actress, but I wouldn't be at all surprised if she became a director and a producer... She's got all those abilities and that intelligence and the knowledge of the business from years of doing it... from a young age."

In the six-episode biopic limited series Pistol for FX, about the Sex Pistols, Williams plays the part of the real life punk rock icon Jordan (Pamela Rooke). The series is based on the 2018 memoir of guitarist Steve Jones, Lonely Boy: Tales from a Sex Pistol; and was executively produced and directed by Danny Boyle. Jordan was the archetypal subversive model whose 'distinctive Vivienne Westwood-designed outfits' and 'outrageous make-up' made her the original face of punk, and was co-credited with creating the punk fashion style. Williams' is under-utilis·ed but brings her "formidable screen presence" as the "untouchably cool" Jordan complete "with a vertical sheet of peroxide blonde hair." Rooke acted as an advisor on the show informing Williams that in portraying her, she would be playing a very strong female, "a woman set apart, really. I decided that I wanted to be me ... a walking work of art ... I was totally and utterly unshakable." Williams "sparkles" in the second episode's cold opening, when she recreates Jordan's cycling through her seaside home town and then commuting by train wearing a fully revealing transparent PVC top, to the consternation and heckling of the people around her, that straightforwardly presents punk movement's effect on society: a scene both The Guardian and Vogue judged to be one of the strongest in the series. Williams continued to embrace the punk-rock style for her Pistol press tour, thinking of her own public image the actress said that she was inspired by how Jordan used both her clothing and her physicality as a defiant presence, as a political statement that turned the male gaze in on itself and took control of the situation.

In May 2022, it was announced that Williams had been cast in the upcoming Apple drama series The New Look. Set under the backdrop of World War II occupied Paris, she portrays Catherine Dior (Legion of Honour recipient for her actions in the French resistance), the younger sister of the fashion designer Christian Dior whose style was at the time eclipsing that of Coco Chanel. The series was released in February 2024. A second season has been ordered.

In May 2022, it was reported that Williams has been cast in Sinners vs Saints, an adaptation of Anthony Delano's "Joyce McKinney and the Case of the Manacled Mormon" an 'over the top' true story about an eccentric American who was accused of abducting and raping the subject of her sexual obsession, a Mormon missionary called Kirk Anderson, in England in the 1970s. In November 2024, George R.R. Martin hinted at a new project with her.

== Other ventures ==
=== Commercial work ===
In 2015, Williams delivered what The Daily Telegraph described as a feminist speech in New York at the launch of Always' "Like a girl" campaign. The speech was aimed at the Generation Z demographic of which Williams is a member. On 2 February 2020, Williams sang "Let It Go", from the film Frozen, in an Audi commercial that aired during the broadcast of Super Bowl LIV. In July 2020, she featured in the Apple MacBook's "Made in the UK" campaign ad celebrating UK-based creators alongside others including screenwriter and actor Michaela Coel, artist Grayson Perry, film maker Jenn Nkiru, animation studio Aardman, printmaker Gabriella Marcella, rapper Dave and singer Labrinth. In summer 2020, she was also appointed as an ambassador for Cartier's new Pasha de Cartier watch.

In April 2021, H&M announced Williams as its global sustainability ambassador. This followed H&M's announcement in December that its foundation will be spending $100 million (£72 million) on green initiatives. The aim was to promote the brands move to a circular fashion model where customers recycle unwanted garments, resulting in less waste and lower environmental impact H&M. However, Williams and H&M received a backlash from some sustainability activists and fair fashion campaigners, accusing both of greenwashing. The fast-fashion brand recycling initiative was criticised for not going far enough, for not using sustainable materials from the outset, for perceived poor treatment of its workers and failure to meet the Living Wage targets they set themselves. The company strongly defended itself. Williams was criticised for lending her celebrity name and financially benefiting from the corporate partnership.

=== Production companies ===
Williams set up Daisy Chain Productions in early 2016 with Dom Santry and Bill Milner (both of whom she met while working on iBoy) to develop and produce UK-originated short films, theatrical features and high-end television drama, with a focus on opportunities for youth and development of talent in the UK. In 2017 the short film Stealing Silver, which Williams executive produced and starred in alongside Ronald Pickup, was the company's first production.

Williams and Lowri Roberts, via their production company Rapt, teamed up with independent studio Delaval Film as executive producers on a 15-minute British/Czech co-produced stop motion animation short, Salvation Has No Name. Written and directed by Joseph Wallace, filming began in 2020 at Aardman Studios, and is set to be screened at festivals in 2022. Salvation Has No Name, to be screened at festivals in 2022, is a cinematic folktale that explores the issue of xenophobia and faith around the refugee crisis through a surreal performance of a troupe of circus clowns.

=== Internet career ===
With Santry, Williams co-developed and launched the beta version of a new iOS-compatible social media app called Daisie, on 1 August 2018. Daisie is a multi-media social networking platform, designed to help artists and creators of all types and backgrounds from across the various creative industries to showcase their work, discover projects and collaborate and provide an alternative route to develop their careers. The company is based in Shoreditch, in the East End of London. In May 2019, Daisie raised £2 million ($2.5 million) in seed funding. (Note: From Founders Fund, 8VC, Kleiner Perkins, and from the newer venture capital firm Shrug Capital, set up by AngelList's former head of marketing Niv Dror, who also separately invested.) Eleven days after the public launch, in May 2019, the number of users reached one hundred thousand (with 70 per cent of the user base being female), most of whom were in London where the bulk of its marketing efforts had taken place. On AppAdvice, Daisie achieved a score of 4 out of 5.

Users can search for creative projects, and network with other users in the fields they are interested in. Users' profiles grow by connecting with other creative people (via "chains") and working collaboratively on projects (not by obtaining high follower popularity counts, friends, or likes typical of most other social media apps). Williams explains: "The way your profile grows is by the chains that you make. To make a chain with someone, you have to work together." Creative users can use Daisie to showcase their own work or their collaborations in the same or multiple arts industries. They can also gain guidance from leading experts in their field via a question and answer style format with others who have more experience in their fields.

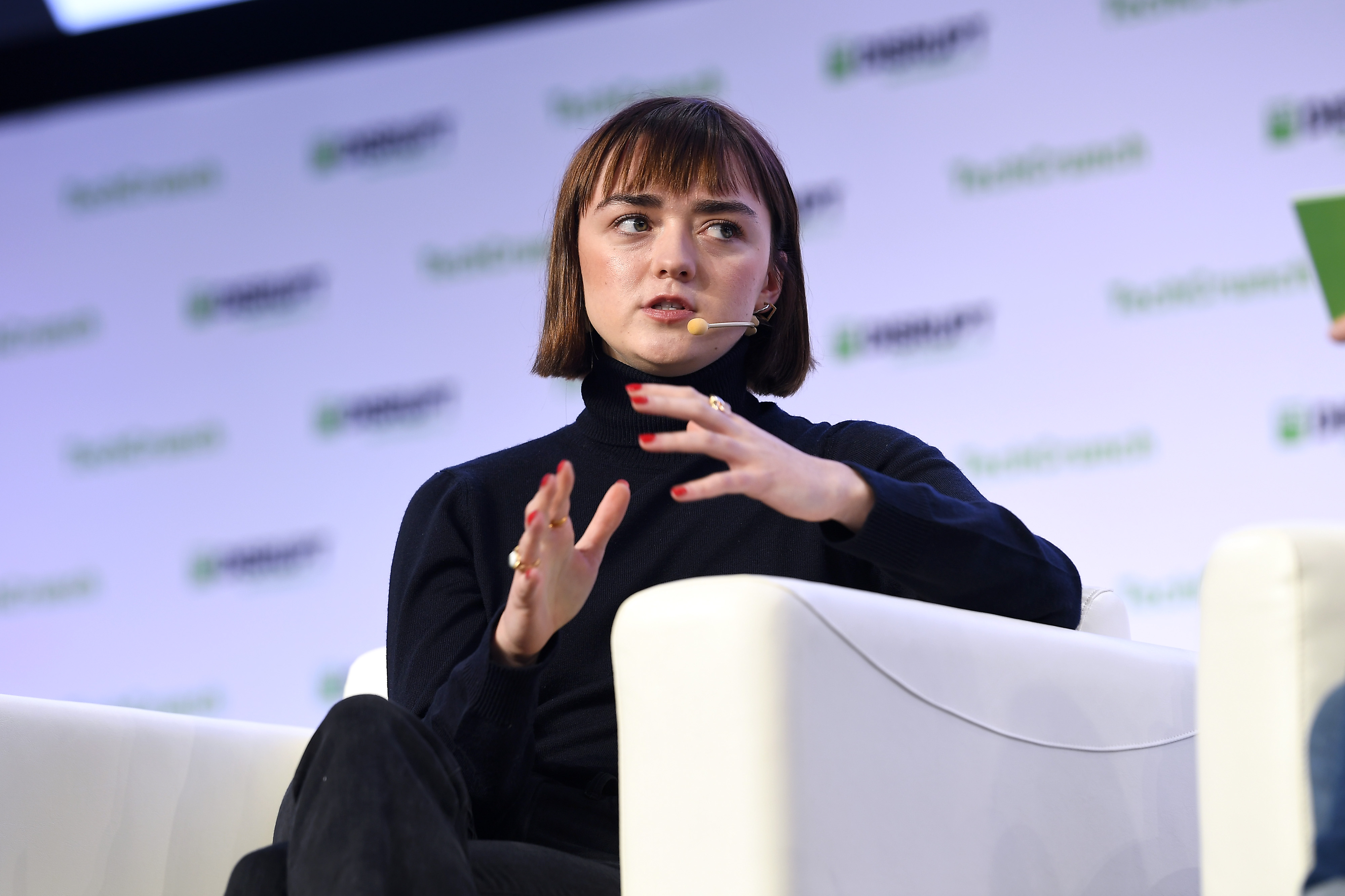
Williams at TechCrunch Disrupt San Francisco (2019).

Williams and Santry said that they designed Daisie as a tool for young people to bypass the obstacles, both internal and external, that prevent budding artists from gaining recognition and exposure. Williams stated that the "goal is to have a community of artists who are collaborating with each other, uploading their work, sharing their projects and ultimately ... help people with their own careers, rather than our own." Daisie does not allow company profiles, the focus being on individual creators. Williams explained in 2019 that instead of creators "having to market themselves to fit someone else's idea of what their job would be, they can let their art speak for themselves."

In 2019, Williams presented a TEDx talk in Manchester on the topic "Don't strive to be famous, strive to be talented". She ended the talk by introducing Daisie as a social network tool for artists to collaborate with each other, and as a way for artists to take back control.

Williams is also the Creative Strategist and advisor to a platform called Contact (launched in October 2020) which was co-founded by Williams' partner Reuben Selby, who was formerly part of her Daisie team. Initially targeted at connecting agencies and fashion models (including support features including licensing and insurance). Following successful fundraising ($1.9 million (£1.4 million) seed funding), the intention is to expand into other creative fields such as photographers, stylists, videographers, and more. Contact offers an alternative approach to working in the creative industries which is currently dominated by agencies. Via Contact, individuals and businesses can discover and book creators and creative services directly, circumventing the need for an agency.

In 2021, Williams started a podcast, Frank Film Club, with filmmaker Lowri Roberts and casting director Hannah Marie Williams, with each episode discussing and reviewing a film they had recently watched.

== Personal pursuits ==
=== Personal life and fashion ===
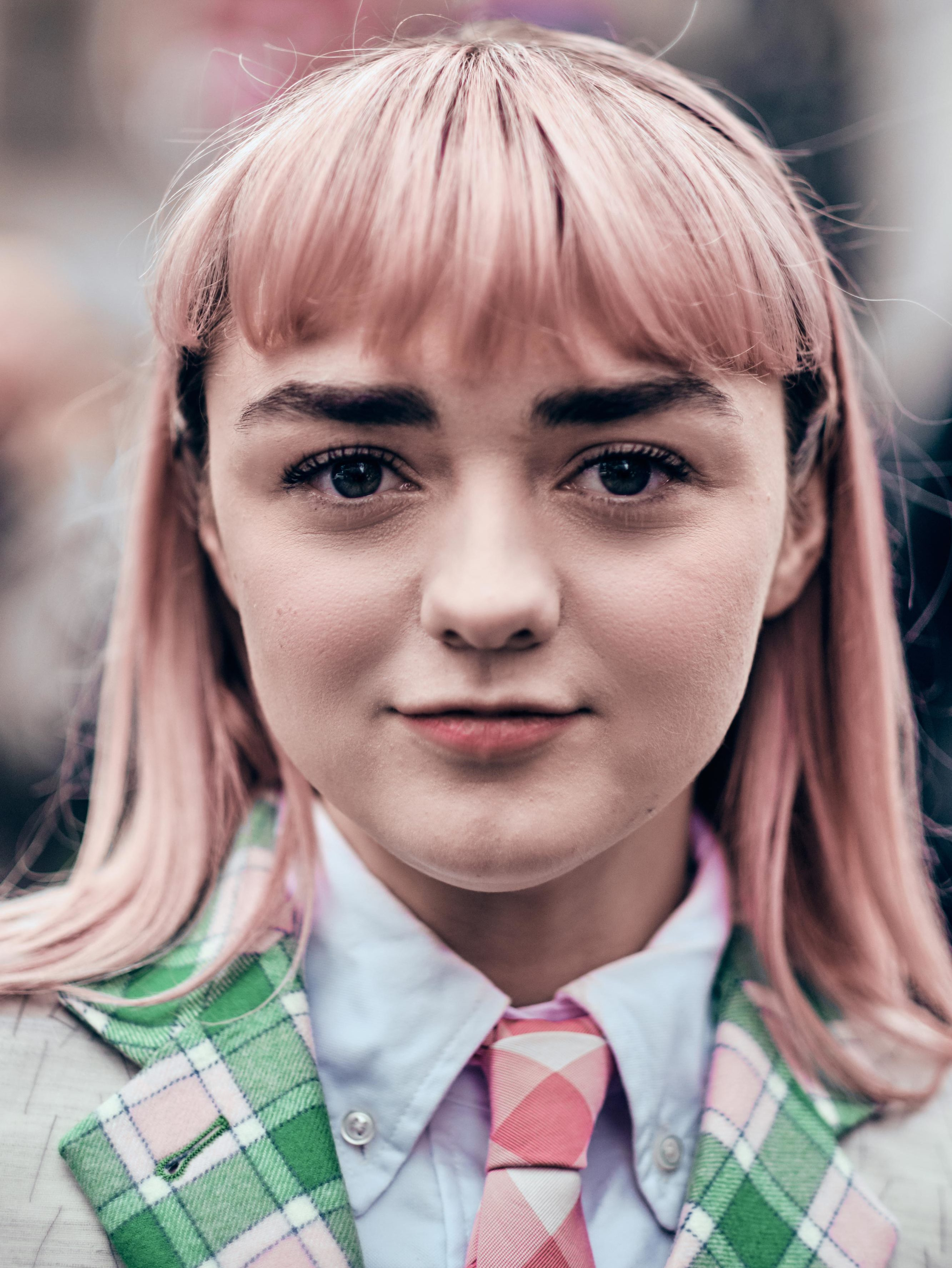
Williams at Paris Fashion Week in 2019

Though Williams has been quoted saying "No dress in the world is worth giving up sword fighting", according to Vogue's Janelle Okwodu, Williams has "cultivated a quirky, youthful style", while The Daily Telegraph's senior fashion editor Emily Cronin pointed out Williams' "street style", and that as a celebrity she has been courted by the fashion industry. In 2019, Williams and her then-boyfriend Reuben Selby (whose relationship ended in February 2023) started to appear on the fashion scene as a couple, regularly in co-ordinated ensembles. From 2020, she collaborated with Selby with the establishment of his own sustainable genderless fashion line — which he debuted during the Paris Fashion Week in the courtyard of the Ritz Paris.

=== Activism and philanthropy ===
Williams is a vocal environmental activist. In a 2019 interview with Dazed Digital, she said "activist groups like Extinction Rebellion" were a major inspiration. Williams is a global ambassador and campaigner for dolphin trainer Ric O'Barry's Dolphin Project, taking part in protests against dolphin hunts. She has also actively supported various campaigns in support of anti-bullying, anti-racism (Black Lives Matter), the environmental organisation Greenpeace and the clean water charity WaterAid, and used her status to encourage young people to vote (for the Labour Party in 2020). During the coronavirus pandemic, she donated £50,000 ($62,500) to support the work of the Bristol Animal Rescue Centre, from which she had adopted a dog, and in 2022 became an ambassador for Bristol-based The MAZI Project providing disadvantaged young people with food boxes.

Williams (in collaboration with a designer from Daisie), along with Zoe Sugg and Adwoa Aboah, designed a limited-edition period bag for WaterAid's non profit monthly subscription service Fempowered. Sales of the bags are intended to tackle taboos regarding periods while also raising money to tackle international inequalities of period poverty.

In April 2021, Williams was appointed the World Wildlife Fund's (WWF) first global ambassador for climate and nature. At the eve of COP26 November 2021, Williams (as the WWF Global Ambassador) delivered the opening address at the premiere of Sir David Attenborough's upcoming television series The Green Planet at Glasgow's IMAX cinema.

== Acting credits ==
Key
| † | Denotes projects that have not yet been released. |

=== Films ===
| Year | Title | Role | Notes | Ref. |
|---|---|---|---|---|
| 2012 | The Olympic Ticket Scalper | Scraggly Sue | Short film | |
| 2013 | Up on the Roof | Trish | Short film/also executive producer | |
| 2013 | Heatstroke | Josie "Jo" O'Malley | | |
| 2014 | Gold | Abbie | | |
| 2014 | The Falling | Lydia Lamont | | |
| 2015 | Cyberbully | Casey Jacobs | Channel 4 television film | |
| 2016 | Regardez | The Maid | Short film | |
| 2016 | The Book of Love | Millie Pearlman | | |
| 2017 | iBoy | Lucy Walker | Netflix television film | |
| 2017 | Mary Shelley | Isabel Baxter | | |
| 2018 | Stealing Silver | Leonie | Short film/also executive producer | |
| 2018 | Corvidae | Jay | Short film | |
| 2018 | Early Man | Goona (voice) | | |
| 2018 | Then Came You | Skye Aitken | | |
| 2020 | The New Mutants | Rahne Sinclair / Wolfsbane | | |
| 2020 | The Owners | Mary / Jane Vorrel | | |
| 2022 | Salvation Has No Name | N/A | Executive producer Animated short | |
| 2024 | The Luckiest Man in America | Sylvia | | |
| 2026 | 500 Miles | Kait | | |
| 2026 | Practical Magic 2 | Antonia Owens | | |
| TBA | Sinner V. Saints † | TBA | | |

=== Television ===
| Year | Title | Role | Notes | Ref. |
|---|---|---|---|---|
| 2011–2019 | Game of Thrones | Arya Stark | Main role, 59 episodes | |
| 2012 | The Secret of Crickley Hall | Loren Caleigh | 3 episodes | |
| 2014 | Robot Chicken | Black Cherry Pie (voice) | Episode: "Bitch Pudding Special" | |
| 2014 | Robot Chicken | Didi Pickles / Bee Cosplayer (voices) | Episode: "Link's Sausages" | |
| 2015 | Doctor Who | Ashildr / Me | 4 episodes | |
| 2019–2021 | Gen:Lock | Cammie MacCloud (voice) | 15 episodes ~ Rooster Teeth | |
| 2020 | Two Weeks to Live | Kim Noakes | Main role, 6 episodes | |
| 2022 | Pistol | Jordan (Pamela Rooke) | Miniseries, 6 episodes | |
| 2024 | The New Look | Catherine Dior | Main role | |

=== Theatre ===
| Year | Title | Role | Venue | Ref. |
|---|---|---|---|---|
| 2018 | I and You | Caroline | Hampstead Theatre | |

=== Video games ===
| Year | Title | Role | Notes | Ref. |
|---|---|---|---|---|
| 2022 | MultiVersus | Arya Stark (voice) | | |

=== Music videos ===
| Year | Title | Artist(s) | Role | Note | Ref. |
|---|---|---|---|---|---|
| 2015 | "Oceans" | Seafret | Superhero | | |
| 2015 | "Sing" | Pentatonix | Herself | | |
| 2015 | "Rest Your Love" | The Vamps | Layla | | |
| 2019 | "Galaxies" | Alice Phoebe Lou | Herself | | |
| 2019 | "You Mean the World to Me" | Freya Ridings | Daughter | Directed by fellow Game of Thrones actress Lena Headey | |
| 2020 | "Miracle" | Madeon | | From the album Good Faith, directed by Lena Headey | |
| 2021 | "Judas on the Dancefloor" | The Zangwills | Producer | Directed by BAFTA winning Lowri Roberts | |
| 2023 | "She's on My Mind" | Romy | | | |

== Awards and nominations ==
| Year | Award | Category | Work | Result | Ref. |
|---|---|---|---|---|---|
| 2011 | Portal Award | Best Young Actor | Game of Thrones | Nominated | |
| 2011 | Scream Award | Shared ~ Best Ensemble | Game of Thrones | Nominated | |
| 2012 | SFX Awards | Best Actress | Game of Thrones | Nominated | |
| 2012 | Portal Award | Best Supporting Actress | Game of Thrones | Won | |
| 2012 | Portal Award | Best Young Actor | Game of Thrones | Won | |
| 2012 | Screen Actors Guild Award | Shared ~ Outstanding Performance by an Ensemble in a Drama Series | Game of Thrones | Nominated | |
| 2013 | Young Artist Award | Best Performance in a TV Series – Supporting Young Actress | Game of Thrones | Nominated | |
| 2013 | BBC Radio 1 Teen Award | Best British Actress | Herself | Won | |
| 2014 | Screen Actors Guild Award | Shared ~ Outstanding Performance by an Ensemble in a Drama Series | Game of Thrones | Nominated | |
| 2014 | EWwy Award | Best Supporting Actress, Drama | Game of Thrones | Won | |
| 2015 | SFX Awards | Best Actress | Game of Thrones | Nominated | |
| 2015 | Screen Actors Guild Award | Shared ~ Outstanding Performance by an Ensemble in a Drama Series | Game of Thrones | Nominated | |
| 2015 | Empire Award | Empire Hero Award | Game of Thrones | Won | |
| 2015 | EWwy Award | Best Supporting Actress, Drama | Game of Thrones | Nominated | |
| 2015 | Berlin International Film Festival | Shooting Stars Award | The Falling | Won | |
| 2015 | Saturn Award | Best Performance by a Young Actor in a Television Series | Game of Thrones | Won | |
| 2016 | Shorty Award | Favorite Actress | Herself | Nominated | |
| 2016 | London Film Critics' Circle Award | Young British/Irish Performer of the Year | The Falling | Won | |
| 2016 | Evening Standard British Film Award | Rising Star | The Falling | Won | |
| 2016 | Screen Actors Guild Award | Shared ~ Outstanding Performance by an Ensemble in a Drama Series | Game of Thrones | Nominated | |
| 2016 | Saturn Award | Best Performance by a Young Actor in a Television Series | Game of Thrones | Nominated | |
| 2016 | Primetime Emmy Award | Outstanding Supporting Actress in a Drama Series | Game of Thrones | Nominated | |
| 2017 | Screen Actors Guild Award | Shared ~ Outstanding Performance by an Ensemble in a Drama Series | Game of Thrones | Nominated | |
| 2018 | Screen Actors Guild Award | Shared ~ Outstanding Performance by an Ensemble in a Drama Series | Game of Thrones | Nominated | |
| 2018 | MTV Movie & TV Awards | Best Performance in a Show | Game of Thrones | Nominated | |
| 2019 | Primetime Emmy Awards | Outstanding Supporting Actress in a Drama Series | Game of Thrones | Nominated | |
| 2019 | MTV Movie & TV Awards | Best Hero | Game of Thrones | Nominated | |
| 2019 | MTV Movie & TV Awards | Best Fight (Arya Stark vs White Walkers) | Game of Thrones | Nominated | |
| 2019 | Saturn Award | Best Performance by a Young Actor in a Television Series | Game of Thrones | Won | |
| 2019 | People's Choice Awards | The Female TV Star | Game of Thrones | Nominated | |
| 2019 | People's Choice Awards | The Drama TV Star | Game of Thrones | Nominated | |
