= The Owners (2020 film) =

2020 horror thriller film

- Promotional release poster
- Directed by: Julius Berg
- Written by: Mathieu Gompel; Julius Berg; Geoff Cox
- Based on: Une Nuit de Pleine Lune by Hermann Huppen and Yves H.
- Produced by: Alain de la Mata; Christopher Granier-Deferre
- Starring: Maisie Williams; Sylvester McCoy; Rita Tushingham; Jake Curran; Ian Kenny; Andrew Ellis
- Cinematography: David Ungaro
- Edited by: Marc Boucrot
- Music by: Paul Frazer; Vincent Welch
- Production companies: XYZ Films; Logical Pictures; Wild Bunch; Blue Light
- Distributed by: RLJE Films (United States); Signature Entertainment (United Kingdom)
- Release date: September 4, 2020 (United States)
- Countries: United States; United Kingdom; France
- Language: English
- Box office: $583,134

The Owners is a 2020 horror thriller film adapted from the graphic novel Une nuit de pleine lune by Hermann Huppen and Yves H. Directed and co-written by Julius Berg in his feature film directorial debut, the film stars Maisie Williams, Sylvester McCoy, Rita Tushingham, Jake Curran, Ian Kenny and Andrew Ellis. The film is set in the 1990s and is about a retired married couple in rural England whose home is besieged by four young criminals. An international co-production of the United States, United Kingdom, and France, The Owners was released in the US on September 4, 2020, by RLJE Films.

== Plot ==
Gaz, Nathan, and Terry have decided to break into the home of Dr. Richard Huggins and his wife Ellen, as it is in the countryside and is said to have a very large safe full of cash. Nathan's girlfriend, Mary complicates matters when she arrives to retrieve her car to go to work; however, she is persuaded to come along. She enters the house after the boys fail to access the safe, as she had been waiting outside for a long while.

Once inside, she tells Nathan that she is pregnant. When the Hugginses return, the boys tie the couple up and attempt to threaten them into opening the safe. In the process, Richard recognises Nathan and Terry from when they were children which causes Nathan to become reluctant to continue the theft. In an attempt to take control, Gaz picks a fight with Nathan and stabs him. He then ties up Ellen and tries to hurt her with a circular saw after Richard lies about the combination to the safe twice, only for Mary to kill him with a sledgehammer. As she and Terry untie the couple, Ellen seems to recognise Mary.

Richard deceives Mary by offering to operate on Nathan and pretending to call for an ambulance while Ellen offers to nurse Terry's injured foot. When Mary sees Ellen coddling Terry then reassuringly kissing his bare buttocks after administering an injection, she realises that they have been tricked. After being secretly drugged by Ellen, Terry hallucinates Mary's twin sister Jane, who went missing a few months back and is presumed to have run away. Richard tries to persuade Mary and Terry to drink tea with them, during which they discuss the untimely death of the couple's daughter, Kate, years prior, as well as the mysterious disappearances of numerous teenage girls in the area. Now aware of the danger the couple poses, Mary tries unsuccessfully to escape. She and a paralysed Terry make it to the garage and she tries to drive away in a van belonging to the Huggins, only for Terry to shoot her in the back as she puts the van into drive.

As she bleeds out, Richard taunts Mary about her impending death, despite acknowledging that she saved him and his wife from Gaz. He also tells her that he and his wife have kidnapped and imprisoned several girls in their safe, which is actually a vault where they would dress them up as little girls and call them "Kate". It's insinuated that the girls who did not work out were killed and disposed of. However, the most recent girl they kidnapped did fit the role. And when Richard opens the vault, it is revealed that Mary's sister, Jane is inside. Mary finally succumbs to blood loss, with the last thing she sees being her long-lost sister in chains. As a reward for helping them, the Hugginses imprison Terry inside the vault with Jane.

The film ends with Terry's mother discussing her son's disappearance with the Hugginses, unaware of the couple's involvement and the presence of Mary's freshly buried corpse in the garden, presumably alongside Gaz and Nathan.

== Cast ==
- Maisie Williams as Mary / Jane Vorrel
- Sylvester McCoy as Dr. Richard Huggins
- Rita Tushingham as Ellen Huggins
- Jake Curran as Gaz
- Ian Kenny as Nathan
- Andrew Ellis as Terry
- Stacha Hicks as Jean

== Production ==
In February 2019, it was announced that Maisie Williams had been cast for the film. In May 2019, Jake Curran, Ian Kenny, Andrew Ellis, Sylvester McCoy, Rita Tushingham and Stacha Hicks joined the cast.

In May 2019, principal photography began and filming took place in an isolated Victorian mansion in Kent, near London.

Director and co-writer Julius Berg, speaking of the film's themes, stated that "in a way, it's a bit of an anti-capitalist movie. When you're poor you have less of a chance to survive."

== Release ==
In April 2020, RLJE Films acquired distribution rights to the film. It was released in the United States on September 4, 2020.

== Reception ==
=== Critical response ===
On the review aggregator website Rotten Tomatoes, the film holds an approval rating of 63% based on 49 reviews, with an average rating of 5.8/10. The website's critics consensus reads: "The Owners will prove excessively mean-spirited and over the top for some, but should be just pulpy enough for genre enthusiasts up for some home-invasion thrillers." Metacritic reports a score of 53 out of 100 based on four critic reviews, indicating "mixed or average reviews".
