= Then Came You (2018 film) =

Peter Hutchings film

- Film poster
- Directed by: Peter Hutchings
- Written by: Fergal Rock
- Produced by: Nicolas Chartier; Brice Dal Farra; Claude Dal Farra; Brian Keady; Alissa Phillips; Derrick Tseng
- Starring: Asa Butterfield; Maisie Williams; Nina Dobrev; Peyton List
- Cinematography: Andre Lascaris
- Edited by: Jacob Craycroft; Jason Nicholson
- Music by: Spencer David Hutchings
- Production companies: BCDF Pictures; Voltage Pictures
- Distributed by: Shout! Studios
- Release dates: October 12, 2018 (Woodstock); February 1, 2019 (United States)
- Running time: 97 minutes
- Country: United States
- Language: English
- Box office: $668,488

Then Came You, also known as Departures, is a 2018 American romantic comedy-drama film directed by Peter Hutchings and written by Fergal Rock. It stars Asa Butterfield, Maisie Williams, Nina Dobrev, Tyler Hoechlin, David Koechner, Ken Jeong and Peyton List.

The film premiered at the 2018 Woodstock Film Festival and was released on February 1, 2019, to generally average reviews.

== Plot ==
Skye Aitken is an adolescent girl who is told she has reached the final stages of her cancer and has little time left. Calvin Lewis is a young man working as a baggage handler at the airport along with his father and elder brother Frank. At work, Calvin has a crush on Izzy, a flight attendant, but has difficulty talking to her. Calvin struggles to interact with others since he has a constant fear that he is dying. His doctor thinks he's a hypochondriac, though Calvin denies it, and advises him to go to a support group for those with cancer to gain a different perspective.

At the meeting, Calvin encounters Skye, who immediately shows an interest in him. Although he tries to explain to Skye that he doesn't have cancer, they quickly become friends and Calvin offers to help Skye finish her list of things to do before she dies. Initially annoyed with her blunt, unpredictable behavior, Calvin eventually confesses that he enjoys being her friend and misses her when she's not around. Skye goes to a high school party with Calvin, where she sees one of her friends make out with Will, a guy whom she has a crush on. As Calvin and Skye begin to spend more time together, Calvin slowly overcomes his fear of dying.

Skye manages to set up a date for Calvin with Izzy, during which she falsely informs Izzy that Calvin also has cancer. Izzy then shows more interest in Calvin, and the two begin dating. Skye reveals to Calvin that she has always been aware that Calvin does not have cancer, even so, Calvin hesitates to tell Izzy the truth as he is worried that she only likes him because she thinks he has cancer. Skye learns from Lucy, Calvin's sister-in-law, that his mother "shut down" after the death of his twin sister in a car accident when they were 8 years old while their mother was driving. Calvin finally admits to Izzy on a date that he doesn't have cancer, but she breaks up with him because she is hurt that he lied to her. Skye decides to lose her virginity to Will.

Calvin becomes depressed after his breakup with Izzy and stops going to work, but his father convinces him to go back to work. Meanwhile, Skye admits to Calvin that she was disappointed after losing her virginity to Will because it happened so quickly. After Skye passes out in public and is sent to the hospital, Lucy simultaneously goes into labor, allowing Calvin and Skye to be able to meet his new niece. Frank and Lucy announce that they want Skye and Calvin to be the baby's godparents, even as Skye points out that she does not have long to live. Calvin begins to have a panic attack but Frank helps him calm down and reminds him that Skye still needs him to be there for her.

Calvin makes efforts to help Skye finish the rest of the things to do on her lists with a little help from Izzy and Skye's parents. Calvin reveals to Skye that he stopped celebrating birthdays for the sake of his mother after his twin sister's death. After Skye passes away, Calvin receives birthday cards in the mail from her to make up for the ones he didn’t celebrate. He finally finds the courage to face his fear of heights and decides to take a trip on a plane. During take-off, Izzy and Calvin continuously make eye contact with each other, implying that they may be planning to reconcile their relationship.

== Cast ==
- Asa Butterfield as Calvin Lewis, Frank's brother, Bob's son, and a young man who has a fear of dying and quickly befriends Skye
- Maisie Williams as Skye Elizabeth Aitken, Claire's daughter and a teenage girl with terminal cancer who quickly befriends Calvin
- Nina Dobrev as Izzy, a flight attendant whom Calvin has a crush on
- Tyler Hoechlin as Frank Lewis, Calvin's elder brother, Lucy's husband and Bob's son
- David Koechner as Bob Lewis, Frank and Calvin's father
- Peyton List as Ashley, Skye's former best friend
- Tituss Burgess as Julian, friend and boss to Izzy at the airport
- Sonya Walger as Claire, Skye's mother
- Margot Bingham as Lucy Lewis, Calvin's sister-in-law and Frank's wife
- Ken Jeong as Officer Al, a police officer who befriends Calvin after assuming he has cancer
- Briana Venskus as Officer Mya, partner to Officer Al who befriends Calvin and Skye
- Angel Valle Jr. as Will, a high school boy whom Skye has a crush on
- Rabbi Joseph Kolakowski (uncredited) as Rabbi (extra)
- Obada Adnan (uncredited)

== Production ==
In May 2017, some scenes were shot at Albany International Airport.

== Release ==
The film had its world premiere at the 2018 Woodstock Film Festival on October 12, 2018. It was released in theaters and on VOD by Shout! Factory on February 1, 2019.

== Reception ==
=== Box office ===
Then Came You grossed $668,488 worldwide.

=== Critical response ===
The film has a 59% approval rating on Rotten Tomatoes based on 22 reviews, with an average rating of 5.7/10. On Metacritic, the film has a weighted average score of 44 out of 100, based on 7 critics, indicating "mixed or average reviews". Nell Minow of RogerEbert.com gave the film one star. Sandie Angulo Chen of Common Sense Media gave it three stars out of five.
