= Call Red =

- Genre: Action drama
- Created by: J. C. Wilsher
- Written by: Peter Jukes; Michael Jenner; Brian McGill; Alan Whiting
- Directed by: Peter Barber-Fleming; Christopher King; Ian Knox
- Starring: Michael Carter; Seamus Gubbins; Allie Byrne; Adam Levy; Claire Benedict; Maria McAteer; Ken Drury; Vincent Regan; Kelle Spry; Morgan Jones; Charlie Caine
- Opening theme: "Guardian Angel" by Marcella Detroit
- Composers: Francis Haines; Stephen W. Parsons
- Country of origin: United Kingdom
- Original language: English
- No. of series: 1
- No. of episodes: 7

Production
- Executive producer: Antony Root
- Producer: Gillian Gordon
- Production locations: London, England, UK
- Cinematography: Peter Middleton
- Editor: Martin Sharpe
- Running time: 60 minutes
- Production companies: Thames Television; Meridian Television

Original release
- Network: ITV
- Release: 8 January – 19 February 1996

Call Red is a British television action drama series created by J. C. Wilsher that premiered on 8 January 1996 on ITV. The series follows the adventures of an Air Ambulance squad, captained by Phillip Tulloch (Michael Carter). The series draws upon a documentary-style feel, including hand-held camera work for helicopter-based scenes, and detailed outlines of the procedures carried out by the medics themselves. Just a single series of seven episodes was produced. The complete series has been earmarked for release on DVD by Network Distributing, although no set date has been given for the release.

Early reception of the series was critical. Thomas Sutcliffe of The Independent said that the series is composed of "wooden acting" and "cardboard dialogue", and that "the wiser viewer will realise it shows no vital signs at all". Jim White of The Independent stated that "all the characters were ludicrously gung-ho, self-important and convinced they were the only people capable of administering medical assistance; typical doctors then, but not much fun to spend sixty minutes with".

== Cast ==
- Michael Carter as Phillip Tulloch
- Seamus Gubbins as Sean Brooks
- Allie Byrne as Alyson Butler
- Adam Levy as Sam Kline
- Claire Benedict as Jude Patton
- Maria McAteer as Kelly Wallace
- Ken Drury as Ross Murray
- Vincent Regan as Ray Sidley
- Kelle Spry as Clare Waddington
- Morgan Jones as Gary Moulton
- Charlie Caine as Terry Dukes

== Episodes ==
No.	Title	Directed by	Written by	Original release date
1	"Invasion of the Body Snatchers"	Ian Knox	Michael Jenner & Peter Jukes	8 January 1996
2	"Baptism of Fire"	Unknown	Peter Jukes	15 January 1996
3	"Heartbreaker"	Ian Knox	J.C. Wilsher	22 January 1996
4	"Force of Habit"	Unknown	Unknown	29 January 1996
5	"Life Extinct"	Unknown	Unknown	5 February 1996
6	"Night Sun"	Ian Knox	Peter Jukes	12 February 1996
7	"Breaking Strain"	Ian Knox	Unknown	19 February 1996

== Reception ==
The series came under fire when aircraft equipment used in the filming of an episode which saw the team helping victims of a plane crash was returned to the owners severely damaged. It was claimed that the damage amounted to more than £48,000, and was caused when the production company, Thames Television, chose to light fires around fuselage and landing gear, which resulted in burning and corrosion of said equipment, and further damage was caused when the producers tried to extinguish the fires. The case was brought to court on 10 January 1996, just two days after the first episode premiered on ITV.
