= Allie Esiri =

British actress and writer

- Born: Allison Byrne
- Education: St Catharine's College, University of Cambridge
- Occupations: Poetry editor, anthologist, app creator, producer
- Spouse: Mark Esiri
- Children: 3

Allie Esiri is a British writer, poetry editor, and producer who is a former stage, film, and television actress under the name Allie Byrne. Esiri is an editor of poetry anthologies, apps, and audiobooks with live events at festivals and at theatres including a yearly night at London's National Theatre. Esiri devised two poetry apps and is the creator of the A Poem for Every Day of the Year book series.

== Poetry anthologies ==
The first of her series of poetry anthologies, A Poem for Every Night of the Year, won the IBW Book award 2017. A collection of many of the greatest poems ever written, each poem has an introduction, written by Esiri. The anthologies from this series have been picked as best books of the year in publications including The Times, The Observer, The Guardian, and The New Statesman. A Poem for Every Night of the Year might be the bestselling hardback poetry book as it has sold over 150,000 copies Allie Esiri. The Woman Who Brought Poetry Back

Esiri's follow-up anthology, A Poem for Every Day of the Year was published in 2017, with the audiobook read by Helena Bonham Carter and Sir Simon Russell Beale. The Guardian selected it as one of the ten best-ever poetry books. The Times chose the audiobook as one of their best audiobooks of the year. The next in the series, Shakespeare for Every Day of the Year, was published in 2019 in print form, and with an audiobook read by actors including Damian Lewis, Paapa Essiedu, Helen McCrory and Simon Russell Beale. It was chosen as one of The Times' best audiobook and The Observer best books of the year. Subsequent books with similar accolades: A Poet for Every Day of the Year, published in September 2021, with a poem and short biography of a different poet featured each day; A Nursery Rhyme for Every Night of the Year, published in March 2023; 365 Poems for Life, published in October 2023; and A Poem for Every Day of Christmas, published in 2024. Sleep, A Poem for Every Quiet Hour of the Night will be published November 2026.

== Acting career ==
Esiri read Modern and Medieval Languages at St Catharine's College, Cambridge, and appeared in productions including The Winter's Tale directed by Tim Supple and Cyrano de Bergerac, directed by Sam Mendes. Her first major television role was in the Agatha Christie's Poirot adaptation of The Mysterious Affair at Styles in 1990. In 1992 she played Olivia in an English Shakespeare Company production of Twelfth Night directed by Michael Pennington, and appeared in Macbeth directed by Michael Bogdanov.

In 1995, she played Lady Kiely in the television programme Sharpe's Battle, alongside Sean Bean and Hugh Fraser. She played one of the lead roles in the ITV seven-part series Call Red (1996). She also appeared in the Merchant Ivory Productions film, Howards End and the Kenneth Branagh film In the Bleak Midwinter. In 1999 she played environmental activist Teri Riley opposite Trevor Eve in the TV film Doomwatch: Winter Angel. Other acting credits include leads in Men Behaving Badly, Goodnight Sweetheart, A Touch of Frost, Minder, Van der Valk, Dr Faustus at Greenwich Theatre, and David Hare's The Secret Rapture.

== Literary career and live shows ==
Byrne ceased acting in 1999 to write and create poetry projects. She wrote freelance articles for American Vogue, The New York Times, and London's Evening Standard's ES magazine. Under her married name of Allie Esiri she edits poetry anthologies, apps, and shows. Esiri organises regular poetry shows with a variety of well-known actors as readers. "A Poem for Every Night of the Year" was launched at the National Theatre (the first of a series of yearly events) on the Olivier stage on 25 November 2016. Esiri organised similar events at the Hay Festival, Cheltenham Literature Festival, Edinburgh Festival, Oxford Literary Festival, and Bath Festivals. An A Poem for Every Day of the Year show at the National Theatre took place on 10 November 2017.

Esiri organised and hosted an event, Women Poets through the Ages in November 2018, first at the National Theatre, then at London's Bridge Theatre. Her Shakespeare for Every Day of the Year live shows at the National Theatre and Hay Festival have featured many readers, and there is a film, available on YouTube recorded during the lockdown for the Hay Festival, introduced by Esiri. A co-production with Regents Park Open Air Theatre of Shakespeare for Every Day of the Year – Live took place in July 2024 at the Open Air theatre, and again in May 2025. A Poet for Every Day of the Year's was launched at the National Theatre, and is available on National Theatre's YouTube channel.

A Poetry for Every Day show at the National Theatre, available on National Theatre's YouTube channel, included several readings from A Nursery Rhyme for Every Night of the Year. The event was in aid of the DEC Ukraine Humanitarian appeal. Readers included Asa Butterfield, Tom Hiddleston and Kate Fleetwood. A further A Nursery Rhyme for Every Night of the Year event took place at the Hay Festival in May 2023 with a cast including Helena Bonham Carter, Julia Donaldson and Michael Rosen

== Poetry apps ==
In 2011, Esiri co-created the poetry app, "iF Poems" and its accompanying book "iF, A Treasury of Poems for Almost Every Possibility". Esiri conceived of "iF Poems" as an educational poetry app for children of any age. It was chosen to be in The Sunday Times Best Apps of the year list and in The Spectator's top ten ibooks of the year. It is no longer available.

Esiri then created "The Love Book App", recommended by Apple and available on iOS platforms. It contains 300 poems, quotations, letters, and short stories on the theme of love, and is illustrated by Kate Moross.

== Personal life ==
Esiri's acting name was Allie Byrne, though she was born Allison Burns. She is married to Mark Esiri, with whom she has three children.

== Selected television credits ==
- Doomwatch: Winter Angel (1999) – as Teri Riley
- The Bill – as D.S. Hunt (1998)
- Goodnight Sweetheart 1 episode – as Kate (1997)
- Call Red – many episodes, as Alyson Butler (1996)
- Men Behaving Badly 1 episode – as Jill (1995)
- Sharpe's Battle – as Lady Kiely (1995)
- A Touch of Frost – as Ruth Ormrod (1995)
- So Haunt Me as Vic Lewis (1993)
- Van der Valk, The Ties That Bind – as Petra van Leurink (1992)
- Minder The Loneliness Of The Long Distance Entrepreneur and Three Cons Make A Mountain – as Lucy (1991)
- Agatha Christie's Poirot – The Mysterious Affair at Styles – Cynthia Murdoch (1990)

== General references ==
- The Telegraph review of The National Theatre's A Poem for Every Day of the Year Joanna Lumley is an excellent walrus – A Poem for Every Day of the Year, National Theatre, review
- The Telegraph review of The National Theatre's A Poem for Every Night of the Year A Poem for Every Night of the Year, Olivier Theatre, review
- Sunday Times magazine, Allie Esiri 'How does it feel to pick a poem for Christmas' How it feels to... pick a poem for Christmas
- Damian Lewis and Helen McCrory read poems from The Love Book at Cheltenham Literature Festival for Allie Esiri in The Times Husband and wife show support for public poetry with love story in verse
- The Times on Allie Esiri and her iF Poems app From Lewis Carroll to Keats, an app to introduce children to the joy of poetry
- A Poem for Every Day of the Year and A Poem for Every Night of the Year in The Guardian's top ten poetry anthologies Top 10 poetry anthologies
- A Poem for Every Night of the Year in The Observer's best books 2016 Hidden gems of 2016: the best books you may have missed
- The Guardian's best children's books for 2018 of all ages The best children’s books of 2018 for all ages
- The Love Book app created by Allie Esiri with Tom Hiddleston in the Telegraph Love Book app launched for National Poetry Day
- Allie Esiri: the woman who brought poetry back
