= Madeleine Dior =

Mother of Christian Dior (1879–1931)

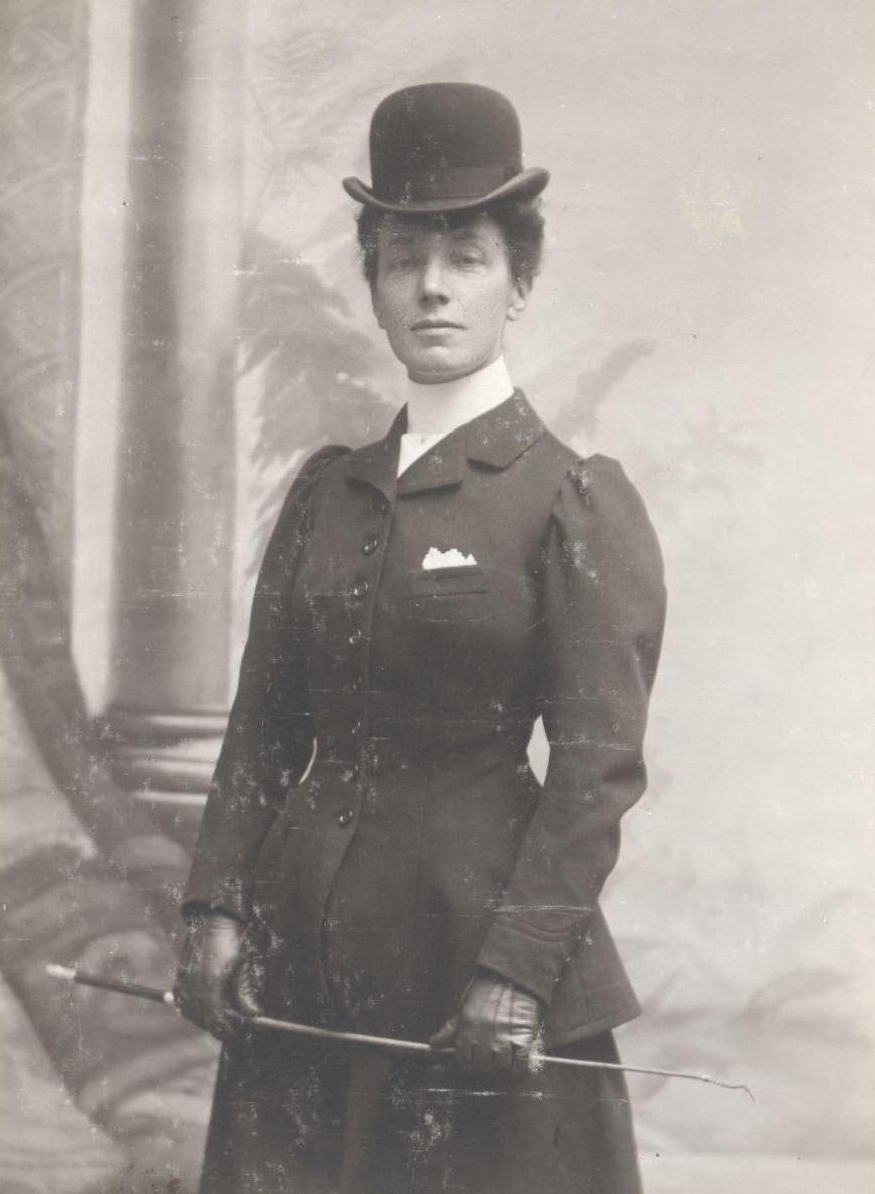
- Born: Marie Madeleine Juliette Martin; 1879; France
- Died: 1931 (aged 51–52); France
- Spouse: Maurice Dior (m. 1898)
- Children: 5, including Christian and Ginette

Marie Madeleine Juliette Martin (French pronunciation: [maʁi madlɛn ʒyljɛt maʁtɛ̃]; 1879–1931) was the wife of the industrialist Maurice Dior, known for her English-style garden at her villa Les Rhumbs in Granville, Manche, France. She was also the mother of the grand couturier Christian Dior and the French Resistance member Catherine Dior.

== Biography ==
Madeleine Martin was the daughter of a lawyer from Angers and Juliette Surosne, originally from the department of Calvados, France. Monsieur Martin died young and Madeleine was brought up by her mother.

In 1898, at the age of 19, she married Maurice Dior who was 26 years old. The couple moved to the center of Granville in the department of Manche, where Maurice Dior had grown up. They had five children: Raymond in 1899, Christian in 1905, Jacqueline in 1909, Bernard in 1910, and Ginette, known as Catherine, in 1917.

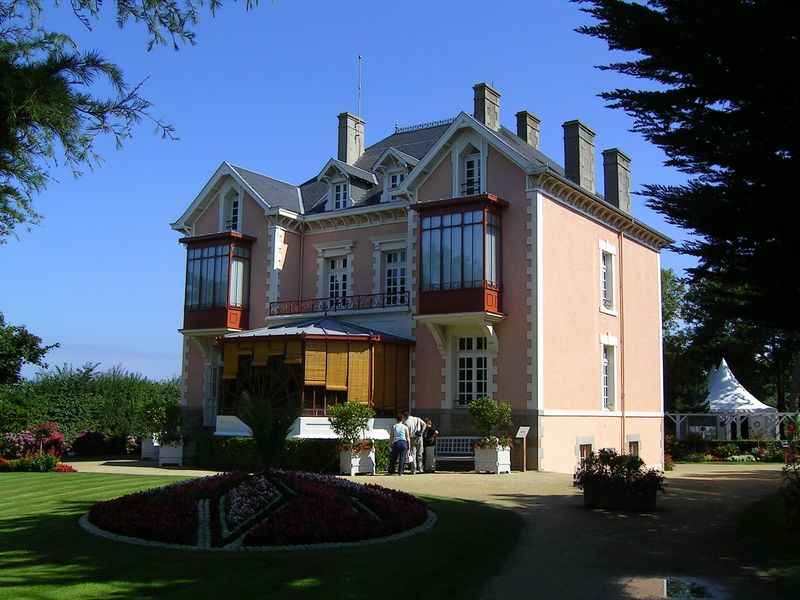
Dior's villa Les Rhumbs in Granville (Manche), France.

In 1905, to satisfy Madeleine, who did not like the house in the center of town, the Dior family purchased a property that was still in Granville but on the edge of a cliff, facing the sea. This windswept villa was called Les Rhumbs, named after the thirty-two divisions of the wind rose. It had a large piece of adjoining land which Madeleine Dior transformed into a southern-style garden, overcoming the hostility of the winds blowing in from the sea to grow delicate plants.

In 1910, taking advantage of the revenue from Maurice Dior's company which was enjoying great success, the family moved to Rue Richard Wagner in Paris, since renamed Rue Albéric Magnard. Madeleine Dior excelled as the lady of the house and a woman of taste, decorating the apartment in the Louis XVI-Passy style fashionable at the time. She surpassed herself when holding dinners served by butlers in white gloves, and her bouquets were much admired by her guests.

In 1914, the family decided to take refuge from the war and returned to live in the Granville villa, which had been their holiday home since 1910. Like all society ladies in the region, Madeleine Dior participated in the war effort. In his autobiography, Christian Dior remembers this period when women were occupied "with making shredded cloth bandages, hospitals, letters from the front and recreation sessions for the injured." The family returned to live in Paris in 1918, not far from the apartment where they had lived before the war.

In 1930, Bernard, the fourth youngest of the family, was affected by a serious nervous disorder. Madeleine Dior, doubtless worn down by what was happening to her son, died the following year. Jacques-Paul Bonjean, a gallery owner and friend of Christian Dior, described her as an "...elegant and slender woman, sometimes distant, always graceful."

== The Les Rhumbs garden in Granville ==
Throughout her life, Madeleine Dior lived out her passion for flowers through the improvement of the grounds surrounding her villa in Granville into a English-style garden. First she had a veranda added to the façade of the house, which sheltered a winter garden, and planted a small wood of umbrella pines to protect her plants from the wind. This was a bold choice of tree for the Normandy coast. She also had windbreak walls put up to protect the property, and finally she had a greenhouse built where the plants were overwintered. On the advice of Christian Dior, the greenhouse was replaced in 1925 by a pergola and pool; a rose garden was planted nearby a short while later. The creation of the garden became a two-person job, which created a bond between Madeleine Dior and her son: the latter organized it by positioning the features, while she took care of the planting. The result was a complex planting scheme that sheltered the most fragile flowers from the wind: "Madeleine Dior's planting formed curtains of shielding greenery, so that the second was more precious and the third consisted of plants that it would have been impossible to grow here: geraniums, roses, jasmine... All these protective screens created layers, structures and motif effects," explains the garden's current landscape gardener.

James de Coquet, journalist for Le Figaro, remembered being amazed by his visit to Les Rhumbs in 1929: "I complimented Madame Dior on her beautiful garden. I told her she must have an excellent gardener."

In 1997, the villa, which had been purchased by the town of Granville in 1932, became the Musée Christian Dior. The garden, Madeleine Dior's life work, is one of the few "artistic gardens" of the early 20th century to have been preserved. For student landscape gardners, it is also an exceptional subject of study.

== Influence on the work of Christian Dior ==
Madeleine Dior was particularly close to her son Christian, the future couturier: in the eyes of her other children, he was her "favorite" and he followed her everywhere, from her Granville garden to Orêve, her favorite Parisian florist, and the dressmaker Rosine Perrault. Madeleine Dior was a close follower of fashion, as demonstrated by a Roaring Twenties dress that she designed, which is exhibited in the Granville museum.

The couturier remembered his mother when, years after her death, on the eve of his first runway show, he was looking at the façade of the House that bore his name on Avenue Montaigne and exclaimed: "If Mother had lived, I would never have dared." In the same way that we sense the presence of Charles Baudelaire's mother, Caroline, in his work and the influence of Jeanne, Marcel Proust's mother, in his, Madame Dior had a profound effect on her son's entire career. Regarding the Granville house, Christian Dior wrote: "I have the tenderest, most magical memories of it. Not only that; my life, my style, owe nearly everything to its location and architecture," and "...(it) was pebbledashed in a very soft pink, blended with gray gravel, and these two colors have remained my favorite shades in couture." But it was above all his mother's garden that made a deep impression on the couturier. Having spent his childhood learning the names of flowers and their descriptions from horticulture catalogs, Christian Dior drew inspiration from them to create the silhouettes that would lead to his success in 1947 with the Corolle line.

The decor of the Diors' apartment in La Muette, Paris, was also imprinted on the couturier's imagination: reference is made to it in the Louis XVI style which inspired the interiors of the Dior boutiques. Finally, it was Madeleine Dior's look that the couturier remembered when he invented the famous New Look with its nipped in waist, pronounced hips and emphasized bust recalling the feminine silhouettes of the Belle Époque. Long after the couturier's death, the House of Dior continues to pay tribute to this muse, as in the Fall-Winter 2005 runway show, where a Belle Époque-inspired dress was named "Madeleine".
