= Cyberbully (2015 film) =

Television film by Ben Chanan

- DVD cover
- Genre: Teen drama
- Written by: Ben Chanan; David Lobatto
- Directed by: Ben Chanan
- Starring: Maisie Williams
- Composer: Jon Opstad
- Country of origin: United Kingdom
- Original language: English

Production
- Producer: Leah Cooper
- Cinematography: Ben Moulden
- Editor: Anna Bench
- Running time: 62 minutes
- Production company: Raw TV

Original release
- Network: Channel 4
- Release: 15 January 2015

Cyberbully is a 2015 British docudrama television film that premiered on Channel 4 on 15 January 2015. The film stars Maisie Williams as Casey Jacobs, a typical teenage girl who lives her life out online, and is called out for her cyberbullying by an anonymous culprit. The film was directed by Ben Chanan, who co-wrote the screenplay with David Lobatto.

Cyberbully was released on DVD on 8 February 2016.

== Plot ==
The film takes place entirely in the bedroom of Casey Jacobs and happens in real time.

One evening, Casey is listening to music but finds her Spotify settings are being tampered with. While Skyping with her best friend Megan, who is about to go on a date, Casey learns that her ex-boyfriend, Nathan, has posted a cruel comment on Twitter about her use of anti-depressants. Megan confides in their friend, Alex, and suggests that he hack Nathan's account as revenge, but he declines. After Casey and Megan end their chat, Casey receives an instant message, ostensibly from Alex, who provides her with a hacked link to Nathan's Twitter account. Casey eagerly posts a tweet about Nathan's erectile dysfunction as revenge. However, after she notices that the type of language the messenger is using is not the sort that Alex would use, Casey realises that the messenger is an anonymous hacker.

The hacker first describes themselves as a "fan", showing Casey's previous activity across social media, even under her online pseudonym "Chronic Youth", before pointing out that Megan hasn't included a photo of Casey on her Instagram account for a long time. Finally, they reveal that they are a vigilante who "helps victims of cyberbullying". Suddenly frightened, Casey excuses herself from the chat, but after seemingly complying, the hacker activates a screamer on her computer, catching her off-guard. They take control of the webcam and start to communicate to Casey in a computer-generated voice.

The hacker reveals a series of nude photographs that Casey took of herself, and threatens to post them online if she either leaves the room, answers any calls, or her father (who repeatedly calls for Casey and knocks on her door) enters. Casey tries to covertly send a message to Megan but the hacker intercepts it by accessing her phone as well, effectively leaving her trapped and isolated. To Casey's horror, the hacker then uploads a video that she and Megan filmed revealing the homosexuality of their friend, Tamara, on her Twitter account, effectively outing her and provoking a series of angry texts from Tamara. When Casey demands to know how the hacker's actions are helping her, the hacker scoffs and reveals that it is Casey who is the cyberbully.

The hacker explains how Casey's "Chronic Youth" activity constitutes cyber-bullying, such as a video she made deriding other haul videos. They also reveal that they had posted the comment about Casey from Nathan's account in order to bait her. Casey at first dismisses their accusations, attempting to justify her actions as being normal for a teenager. The hacker then uses a series of videos and screen-grabs to tell her the story of Jennifer Li, a former schoolmate whose singing videos on Vine had suffered a deluge of abuse as a result of Casey trolling one of her music videos, which instigated a cyberbullying and harassment campaign against her. Jennifer eventually posted a video in which she told the story of her abuse with flash cards, and committed suicide shortly afterwards.

Casey wonders if the hacker is a relative of Jennifer's and tearfully expresses remorse for what happened, but the hacker denies this and instead demands that she admit to being a cyberbully, apologize and take responsibility for Jennifer's death. Casey does so, but the hacker believes she is being insincere, and begins uploading both Casey and Megan's nude photos regardless. The hacker announces that Casey will have to choose either death by taking an anti-depressant for each picture to keep them from being posted until she overdoses, or live with the shame that would inevitably follow from the exposure, along with the loss of her best friend. Defeated, Casey prepares to take her overdose when she sees the hacker expressing amusement by typing "har har har", which matches the language of one of Jennifer's more aggressive trolls, "Steerpike_84".

Casey starts to push back against the hacker, learning they have goaded several others into committing suicide. Her father turns up with a message from Megan, who has deduced that Casey's recent activity is not really her doing. Casey then vomits up the pills she has already taken. Touched by her friend's trust, she eventually decides to call Megan back. The hacker repeats their threats but makes several typos, revealing that they are beginning to falter. Casey simply tells them to go ahead and post the photos if they wish, because they can do nothing to control the actions or emotions of her family, friends or real life. Defeated, the hacker pleads with Casey to stay by offering to reveal their true identity. Casey looks right into the webcam and tells the hacker that their identity doesn't matter to her, because once she stops talking to them, they become nothing. Casey then closes her computer, cutting off the hacker.

Overwhelmed by the hour-long ordeal she had just been through, Casey opens her door and collapses outside. She tearfully calls out to her father, who rushes to her.

== Cast ==
- Maisie Williams as Casey Jacobs
- Ella Purnell as Megan Turner
- Haruka Abe as Jennifer Li
- Jake Davies as Alex Freeman
- Daisy Waterstone as Tamara Mathis
- Wilson Haagens as Hacker
- Anthony Shuster as Dad

== Production ==
The film was based entirely on real experiences. To ensure the script was an accurate portrayal of contemporary teenage life, writer/director Ben Chanan consulted both Williams and his own teenage daughter to ensure any "Dad-isms" were ironed out of the script. Maisie Williams, who portrayed the central character of Casey Jacobs, noted that she had been a victim of cyberbullying after being cast as Arya Stark in Game of Thrones. She received messages calling her "stuck up", and saying that she thought was "too good for everyone else". Like the film's protagonist Williams admitted responding to the bullying in kind, saying "when you're 13 and someone says something nasty, you don't want to ignore them. You want to hurt them like they've hurt you. You get into this bitchy cycle."

== Reception ==
=== Critical response ===
Cyberbully received positive reviews from critics. The Spectator asserted that the one-off play was a "very well made one, deftly shifting our sympathies throughout (with the aid of Maisie Williams's dazzling central performance) and full of genuine menace." Similarly, writing in The Guardian, Filipa Jodelka described Maisie Williams central performance as a "tour-de-force", although noted that unlike its billing it should not be "viewed as a realistic depiction of cyberbullying at all, but as a kind of millennial ghost-in-the-machine spine-chiller instead, replete with traditional horror devices (Faustian pacts, anonymous ghouls, tests of morality), mild peril and creepy strings." Mark Monahan of The Daily Telegraph gave the film three out of five stars, noting the plot's predictability. Despite this he still felt that it was "tense, all too topical, and – here's hoping – maybe even socially useful television."

Ellen E. Jones of The Independent noted that it "was that rare programme that felt authentic enough to persuade teens, while also engaging older viewers." In a further review of the film for The Guardian, Lucy Mangan described the film as "part gothic horror, part An Inspector Calls for the digital age." She also felt that despite Williams's good performance, it was Haruka Abe as Jennifer Li who was the standout performer, with Abe having the more "difficult task of making happiness and optimism compelling until she has to modulate into despair under the weight of the people who attack her and urge her to kill herself."

=== Accolades ===
The film was nominated for Best Single Drama at the 2016 British Academy Television Awards. The film won the 2016 Prix Italia in the TV drama category.
