= Maurice Dior =

French business magnate (1872–1946)

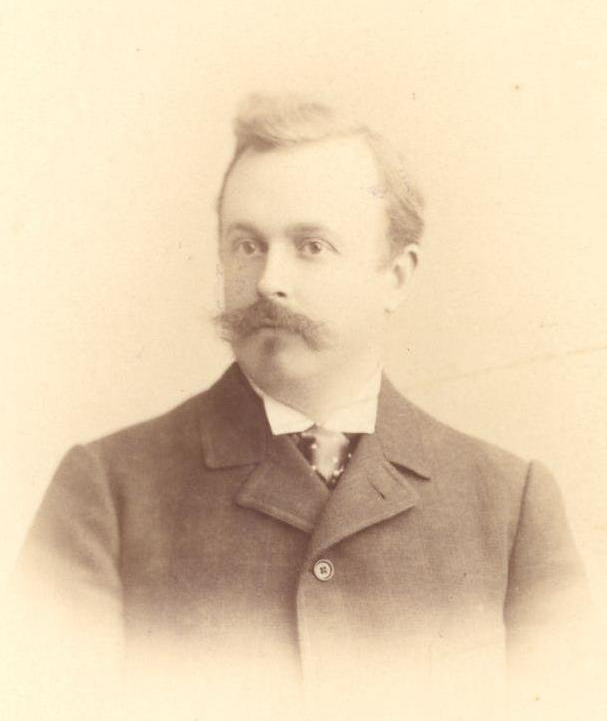
- Dior c. 1900
- Born: 7 February 1872; Normandy, France
- Died: 9 December 1946 (aged 74); Callian, Var, France
- Occupation: Entrepreneur
- Spouse: Madeleine Martin (m. 1898; died 1931)
- Children: 5, including Christian and Ginette

Alexandre Louis Maurice Dior (7 February 1872 – 9 December 1946) was a French business magnate, and the father of fashion designer Christian Dior and French Resistance member Catherine Dior.

== Early life ==
Maurice Dior was born in Normandy and came from a family of industrialists who were former farmers from Savigny-le-Vieux, on the border between the Calvados and Manche departments.

Together with his cousin Lucien Dior, a future member of parliament and minister, he took over the management of a chemical company specializing in fertilizer, founded in 1832 by Louis-Jean Dior. It was situated in Saint-Nicolas, not far from Granville.

In 1898, at the age of 26, he married nineteen-year-old Madeleine Martin. They had five children: Raymond in 1899, then Christian in 1905, Jacqueline in 1909, Bernard in 1910, and Ginette, known as Catherine, in 1917.

== Career ==
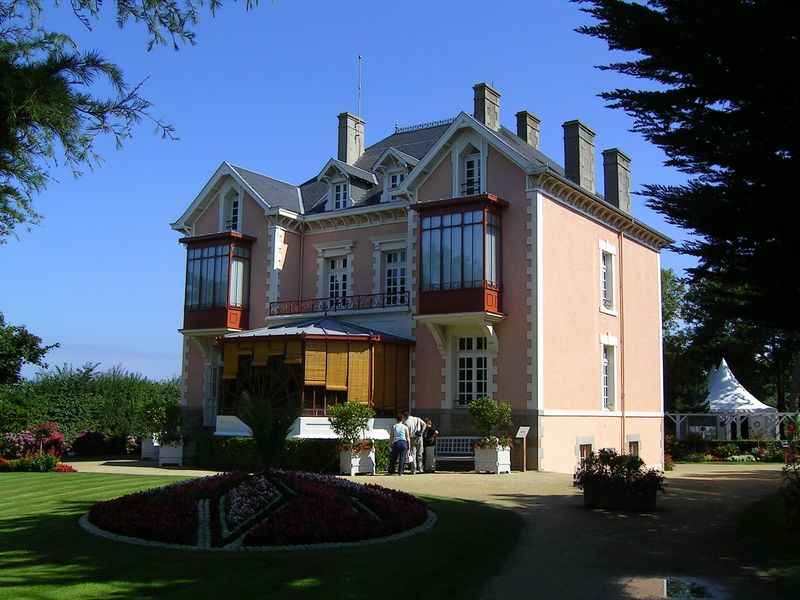
Dior's villa Les Rhumbs in Granville (Manche), France.

Working with Lucien, Maurice strove to make the family firm prosper. In 1905, its capital reached 1.5 million francs. The decision to establish the company headquarters at the Rue d'Athènes in Paris demonstrates this prosperity. The company's success was buoyed along by innovations and the diversification of its activities: the Diors were the first people to produce sulphuric acid for phosphate fertilizer. The family also owned phosphate plants in the departments of Meuse and Ardennes.

In 1912, the family firm adopted the name of "Dior Fils & Cie" (Dior Sons & Co) and became a joint-stock company. Its capital rose to four million francs heralding a period of prosperity that was to last for around twenty years. The Diors opened factories in Brittany – in Landerneau, Rennes and Saint-Marc, a town not far from Brest that was to give its name to the famous washing powder created a few years later. In 1923, Maurice and Lucien Dior's firm became a public company.

This business success led to changes in Maurice Dior's personal life. In 1905, the family left for the center of Granville and moved into a villa—Les Rhumbs—which Maurice's wife Madeleine decorated in the fashion of the time and where she created a garden sheltered from the wind. It is now home to the Musée Christian Dior. The family moved to the Parisian district of La Muette in 1910, to Rue Richard Wagner, later known as Rue Albéric Magnard, keeping Les Rhumbs as a holiday home. After the war, during which the Diors took refuge in Granville, they returned to Paris in 1918, living not far from their previous address. This new apartment once again demonstrated Maurice Dior's success: decorated in neo-Louis XVI style, two valuable paintings were displayed, a Boucher and a Lépicié, which Maurice Dior purchased on the advice of a friend.

== Ruin ==
Wishing to make the revenue generated by his companies growth, Maurice Dior began speculating in 1923. To devote more time to this activity, and noting that his sons would not be taking over the family firm, he delegated some of his responsibilities to his cousin Lucien.

In May 1931, Madeleine Dior died. A few months later, the fall-out from the Wall Street crash of 1929 was felt in France and the businessman's shares lost their value. He then found himself unable to pay back the loan that he had taken out as part of the real estate operations intended to ensure his fortune and that of his sons. Maurice Dior was ruined and forced to liquidate his assets. The family firm was sold, and was later renamed SOFO, then SOFERTI.

He left Paris in 1932 to live in Callian in the department of Var, where life was cheaper. His daughter Catherine accompanied him, while Christian, who was not yet the renowned couturier that he would soon become, stayed in Paris and sent them money regularly. It was in Callian, in Les Naÿssès, the small Provençal farmhouse that he purchased in 1932, that Maurice Dior died on December 9, 1946, a few months before the inauguration of his son's couture house and the resounding success of his first runway show.
