= Angus Tsui =

Hong Konger fashion designer

- Born: 1992 (age 33–34); Hong Kong
- Education: Nottingham Trent University (BA), Hong Kong Design Institute (HD)
- Occupations: Fashion designer; businessman
- Organization: Founder of ANGUS TSUI

Angus Tsui (born 1992) is a fashion designer from Hong Kong who is known for his eponymous fashion brand ANGUS TSUI, which he founded in 2014. Although his designs began with relatively neutral prints, he soon became known for his futuristic, dark designs inspired by things such as Hellraiser and H. R. Giger's art. He is also known for his focus on his designs being environmentally sustainable.

== Biography ==
Tsui was born and raised in Hong Kong, and attended the Nottingham Trent University for a Bachelors of Arts in Fashion Design and the Hong Kong Design Institute for a Higher Diploma in Fashion Design and Development. He learned under Ada Zanditon and Orsola de Castro.

He launched his eponymous fashion brand ANGUS TSUI in 2014. He started by utilizing prints with a neutral style, but started gradually incorporating more futuristic style in his designs, adding elements inspired by exoskeletons and bones that used many more pieces of fabric than were typical in a garment.

His current style has been alternately described as cyberpunk, futurist, and gory. He has also been noted for his commitment to sustainable and eco-friendly fashion.

His designs have been worn by Jace Chan, Alfred Hui, and MIRROR.

He collaborated with Cathay Pacific to design red envelopes in 2017. His designs were included in the Salvatore Ferragamo Museum's Sustainable Futures exhibit in 2019 and Vancouver Art Gallery's Fashion Fictions exhibit in 2023. He created a collection of upcycled courier uniforms in collaboration with DHL in 2024. That same year, he headlined the Centrestage Fashion Show. He showed his collection "Giger", inspired by Alien and H. R. Giger, at London Fashion Week Spring 2025, and his sequel "GIGER Vol. 2" was displayed at London Fashion Week Autumn/Winter 2025. His Autumn/Winter 2026 collection "404: Safety Not Found", which utilized vegan leather to depict wounded flesh, was inspired by Hellraiser and also debuted at London Fashion Week.

He was awarded the Redress Design Award Hong Kong People's Award in 2012, and went on to win the Redress Design Award Alumni Prize in both 2017 and 2024 and the Redress Design Award All-Star Prize in 2020. He was also shortlisted for the Vogue Singapore x BMW Innovation Prize in 2024. He serves as a frequent guest judge at the Redress Design Awards.

He also runs ANCares, an educational charity project focused on sustainable fashion.
