= Nik Thakkar =

English recording artist

NEO 10Y
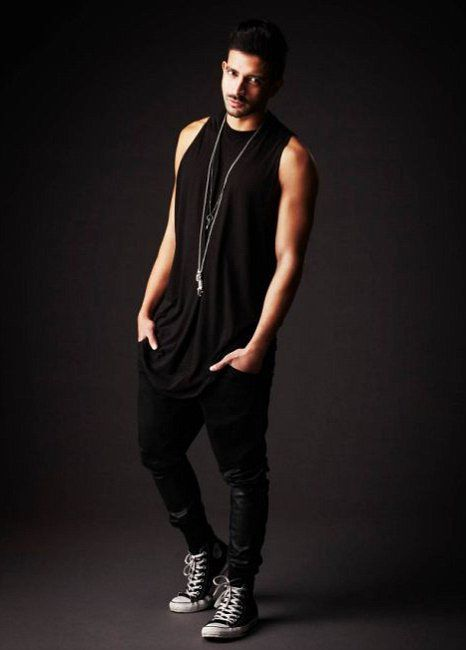
- NEO 10Y in 2015
- Born: London, England
- Known for: Spirituality, Consciousness Expansion, Music, Contemporary Art, Contemporary Music, Song Writing Fashion, Political Art, Pop Music, Activism, Public Speaking
- Awards: GenArt Prize 2015 at New York Fashion Week, Time Out Magazine's Top 100 Creatives

Nik Thakkar is the non-binary multi-disciplinary recording artist known professionally as NEO 10Y.

== Education and early career ==
NEO 10Y was born and raised in London, where he was classically trained in piano and vocals. He studied Law and French at Cardiff University.

In 2013, he was scouted in Paris by Jean-Paul Gaultier for the eponymous label's AW13-14 digital campaign, did the Art of Packing project for Louis Vuitton, and filmed a short film called An Ode to Oud for Tom Ford.

== Career ==
=== 2013 - 2016: Art and fashion ===
Thakkar teamed up with London-based designer Ada Zanditon in 2013 to create Ada + Nik, a luxury non binary clothing line featured in London Collections for five consecutive seasons. They designed five collections with a typically dark silhouette and had runway shows at London and New York Fashion Weeks.

Rapper Angel Haze, artist and poet Kojey Radical, and comedian Jack Whitehall wore the line, which was praised for making wearable technology aesthetically pleasing. Thakkar was described as “the pop couture poster boy.” He served as a judge for WSGN's Global Fashion Awards and the Fashion Monitor Journalism Awards in 2013.

Ada + Nik collaborated with will.i.am to create the world's first camera enabled biker jacket.

=== 2016 to present: NEO 10Y ===
For his stage name NEO 10Y, Thakkar combined neoteny as a positive force and the significance of number 10 as "rebirth and revolution". He first used it for the dark electronic track he anonymously published in June 2016. The song would debut as Amerikkka at a Tom Ford party.

In October 2016, NEO 10Y released "NEO 10Y vs. NIHIL: The Kid That Killed Trump," a three-part music video for his tracks Amerikkka, Janis and Wild West. It caused controversy by using live sex and burning a mask of then-presidential candidate Donald Trump. The artist subsequently received hate mail and FBI reports. NEO 10Y's work has been described as "lyrical political activism".

On 10 October 2018, NEO 10Y released dual release of Dopamine and Poems To Fuck To along with two interconnected videos where they show the artist dragging himself into the future as a symbol for humanity's urgent need to evolve to save the planet.

When discussing the meaning of his artist name further, NEO 10Y says “the one and zero in my name is rooted in the fact that ten is the only number where both parts of the binary code are cohesively together demonstrating a sense of togetherness, which is integral to my voice, non-binary nature and artistry. The ultimate balance. Complete. Also, my Sanskrit name is Nikhil which means "complete".

On October 10, 2019, NEO 10Y released the song Stan Yourself along with a music video which were described as "powerful", "glimmering", "seductive" and "a multidimensional, visually engulfing, cohesive cerebral tapestry.”

In 2020, NEO 10Y released four singles, titled ILY, Y, Crackhead Angel and Unrelatable Autosexual to acclaim from Billboard, COLORS, Paper, Gal Dem, Gay Times, Dazed, BBC Radio, Soho Radio and more.

On January 1, 2021, NEO 10Y released Shortcut To World Peace with a succinct message of love being the shortcut to world peace, and decoding love as a philosophy of non-violence. The intention of Shortcut To World Peace is to "help us manifest freedom, peace and the future that we deserve," according to NEO 10Y in an article for Paper Magazine. The Los Angeles Tribune described NEO 10Y as "A New Wave of Consciousness For An Inclusive Spiritual Revolution".

In 2022, NEO 10Y released 'Spiritual Viagra' and announced their relationship and their “love at first sight” experience which the song and video are based around.

In 2023, NEO 10Y released of their eponymous single, ONENESS (WHO WE ARE). In 2024 he released CHOOSE LOVE / CRYING IN THE SIMULATION as well as a collaboration with Frank Royal and Fairy Boy, titled, The One.

== Musical style and influences ==
NEO 10Y presented his Amerikkka as "electronic aggression" comparable to Aphex Twin and Squarepusher. Thakkar listed Grace Jones, Elliott Smith, Bob Marley and Zaha Hadid as inspirations for his art.

He also cites Britney Spears, Kurt Cobain, Aaliyah and 2Pac as influences.

== Personal life ==
NEO 10Y has been recognized by Conde Nast's them magazine, as a pioneering queer artist known for incorporating astrology into their music releases.

== Activism ==
In 2015, Thakkar teamed up with All Boxed Up to raise funds to support the Albert Kennedy Trust for homeless LGBTQ youth.

Thakkar attended an anti-Donald Trump Rally in London dressed in his NEO 10Y Mickey Mouse character.

In 2018, Nik was part of a controversial set of episodes for BBC3's ‘Britain’s Most Offended’ TV show as a vegan activist. Equating the slaughter of animals to rape and racism, his arguments brought on a large discussion of the treatment of animals.

In 2018 with the release of NEO 10Y single Dopamine, Nik's hopes for world peace was made more clear in this Gay Times article where he said, “For us to choose love, those of us with voices need to use them to speak up, otherwise there is no point in us having platforms.” Also discussing world peace in Billboard he commented on the song Dopamine "the bridge of the song explains this clearly with, "I am full of hope and all I'm longing for is peace/ So please give me that my friend" is the idea of finding peace within oneself, so that we can find peace as a planet, for humanity overall.

In an interview with Buzzfeed in 2019, Nik spoke out about nude solicitations from an editor at Billboard magazine. This resulted in the editor being fired and a movement within the queer community encouraging other artists to speak up about similar unprofessional behaviour. Billboard released a statement in support of NEO 10Y and other artists.

In March 2019, Nik was featured in a mini documentary about Climate Change Anxiety for BBC Ideas where he stated that at this point in history the onus is on the individual to create action through changes in consumption patterns.

In December 2019, NEO 10Y published an essay titled "Deconstructing “genre” and the bipolar experience of being an independent artist in 2020" in Line of Best Fit where they said,. "I describe my sound as genre-bending, and myself as a post pop*. That’s because “pop” has always visibly been white, blonde and female. In my role in society as a rule-breaker of norms within the arts, I wanted to be that queer, brown, non-binary person who also happens to be a full 360º performer and creator of their universe that deconstructs “pop” for what it traditionally has been seen as: a dated concept built by men who've had authoritative control over what is “popular” since the day that music became a capitalist entity as opposed to, say, the God-given right to create sound that every human should have access to".

2020 saw NEO 10Y fronting the Future Normal campaign for The Vegan Society with their dog, 10 and discussing a conscious future for humanity of non violence.

In 2022, NEO 10Y teamed up twice with animal rights organisation PETA to raise awareness about the leather industry, and also at a “Humane Meat” demonstration to show the hypocrisy of the meat industry in reference to the fallacy of “humane slaughter”.

In 2024, NEO 10Y hosted National Animal Rights Day in London and also performed at Vegan Camp Out. He also partnered with PETA on another think piece called "Speciesism is the root of all oppression," a line he frequently uses in interviews and press.

2025 saw NEO 10Y's appearance on Jimmy Carr's show where he discussed a vegan future, his music and purpose to help manifest a protopian dimension of peace through the expansion of love energy. Much of the content went viral amassing over 20 million views.

== Awards and recognition ==
Thakkar won the GenArt Prize together with Ada Zanditon at New York Fashion Week in 2015.

He was included among the one hundred most original and influential people in the UK creative and media industries by Time Out Magazine in 2012 and was voted one of the top-five most eligible bachelors of 2017 by the readers of Out Magazine.

=== Media Appearances ===
In 2023, NEO 10Y made an appearance in the Channel 4 series "Higher Ground," where he was featured in an episode discussing the topic of manifesting a vegan future before and after consuming magic mushroom psychedelics. This appearance garnered significant attention, resulting in the episode becoming Channel 4's highest-engaged Instagram post ever. 2025 saw NEO 10Y's appearance on Jimmy Carr's show where he discussed a vegan future, his music and purpose to help manifest a protopian dimension of peace through the expansion of love energy. Much of the content went viral amassing over 20 million views.
