= Classique =

Classique may refer to:

- Classique (fragrance), a women's fragrance created by Jacques Cavallier for Jean-Paul Gaultier in 1993
- ATMA Classique, a Canadian record label
- Canadian Classique, a soccer rivalry between Toronto FC and the Montreal Impact
- Le Classique, a football match contested between French clubs Paris Saint-Germain and Olympique de Marseille
- Musique classique, a French television channel
- Orchestrette Classique, an American female chamber orchestra in New York
- Radio Classique, a French classical music radio station
