= Jean Paul Gaultier =

French fashion designer (born 1952)

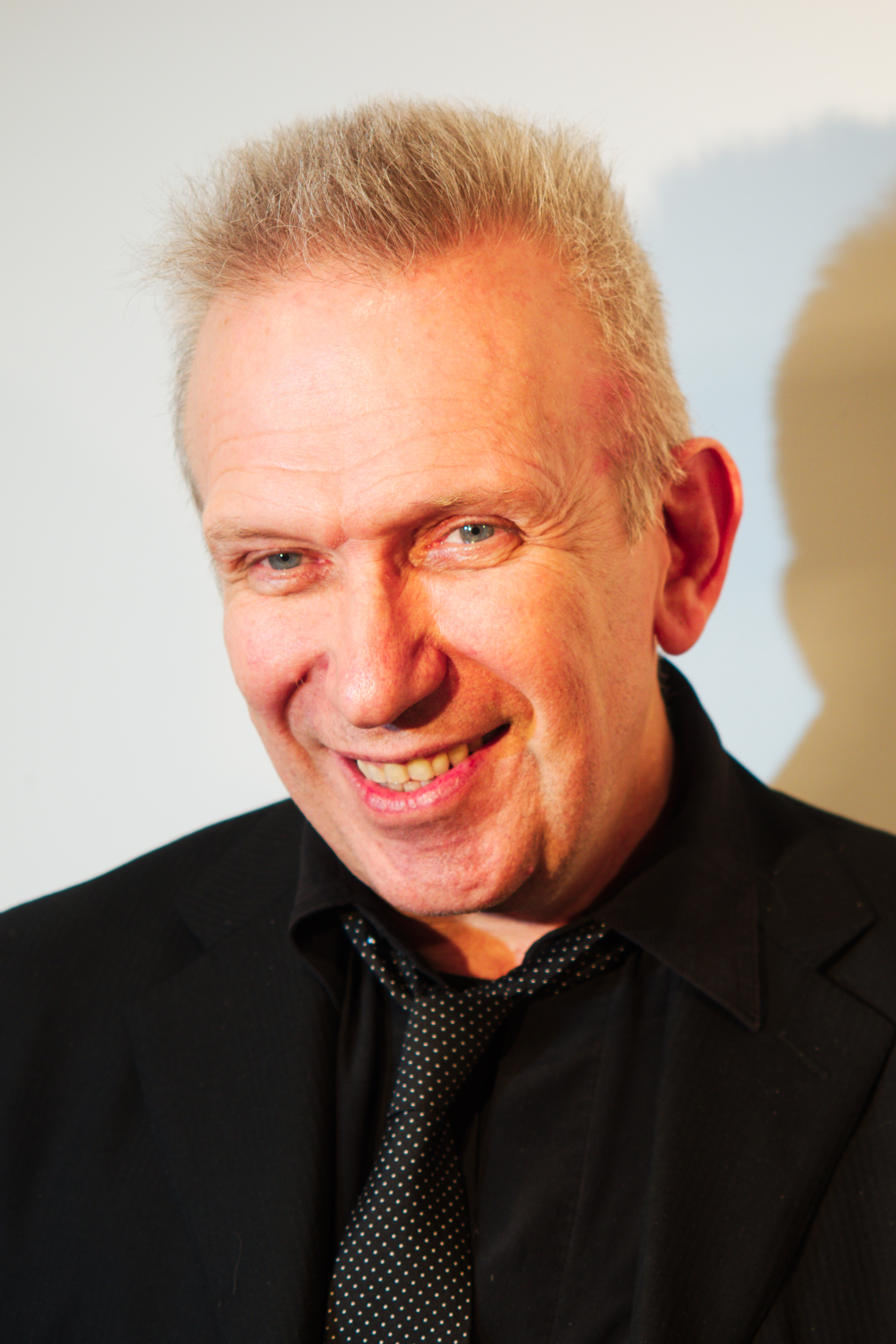
- Gaultier in 2015
- Born: 24 April 1952 (age 74); Arcueil, France
- Labels: Jean Paul Gaultier; Hermès (2003–2010)
- Partner: Francis Menuge (from 1975; died 1990)
- Website: jeanpaulgaultier.com

Jean Paul Gaultier (Note: His first name is sometimes punctuated with a hyphen as Jean-Paul Gaultier.) (French: [ʒɑ̃ pɔl ɡotje]; born 24 June 1952) is a French haute couture and prêt-à-porter fashion designer.

He is described as an "enfant terrible" of the fashion industry and is known for his unconventional designs with motifs including corsets, marinières, and tin cans. Gaultier founded his eponymous fashion label in 1982, and expanded with a line of fragrances in 1993. He was the creative director for French luxury house Hermès from 2003 to 2010, and retired following his 50th-anniversary haute couture show during Paris Fashion Week in January 2020.

As a costume designer, Gaultier created Madonna's cone bra for the 1990 Blond Ambition World Tour, and the costumes for the movies The City of Lost Children (1995), The Fifth Element (1997), Bad Education (2004) and The Skin I Live In (2011).

== Early life ==
Gaultier grew up in a suburb of Paris. His mother was a clerk and his father an accountant. It was his maternal grandmother, Marie Garrabe, who introduced him to the world of fashion.

He never received formal training as a designer. Instead, he began to send sketches to famous couture stylists at an early age. Pierre Cardin was impressed by his talent and hired him as an assistant in 1970. Then he worked with Jacques Esterel in 1971 and Jean Patou later that year again worked for Cardin managing the Pierre Cardin boutique in Manila for a year until 1974. Despite Gaultier's youth, Cardin sent him to Manila to manage the local office. Imelda Marcos was one of his clients. He found himself on a "no leave" list and had to pretend to have a family emergency in order to leave. He never returned.

== Career ==
=== Fashion career ===
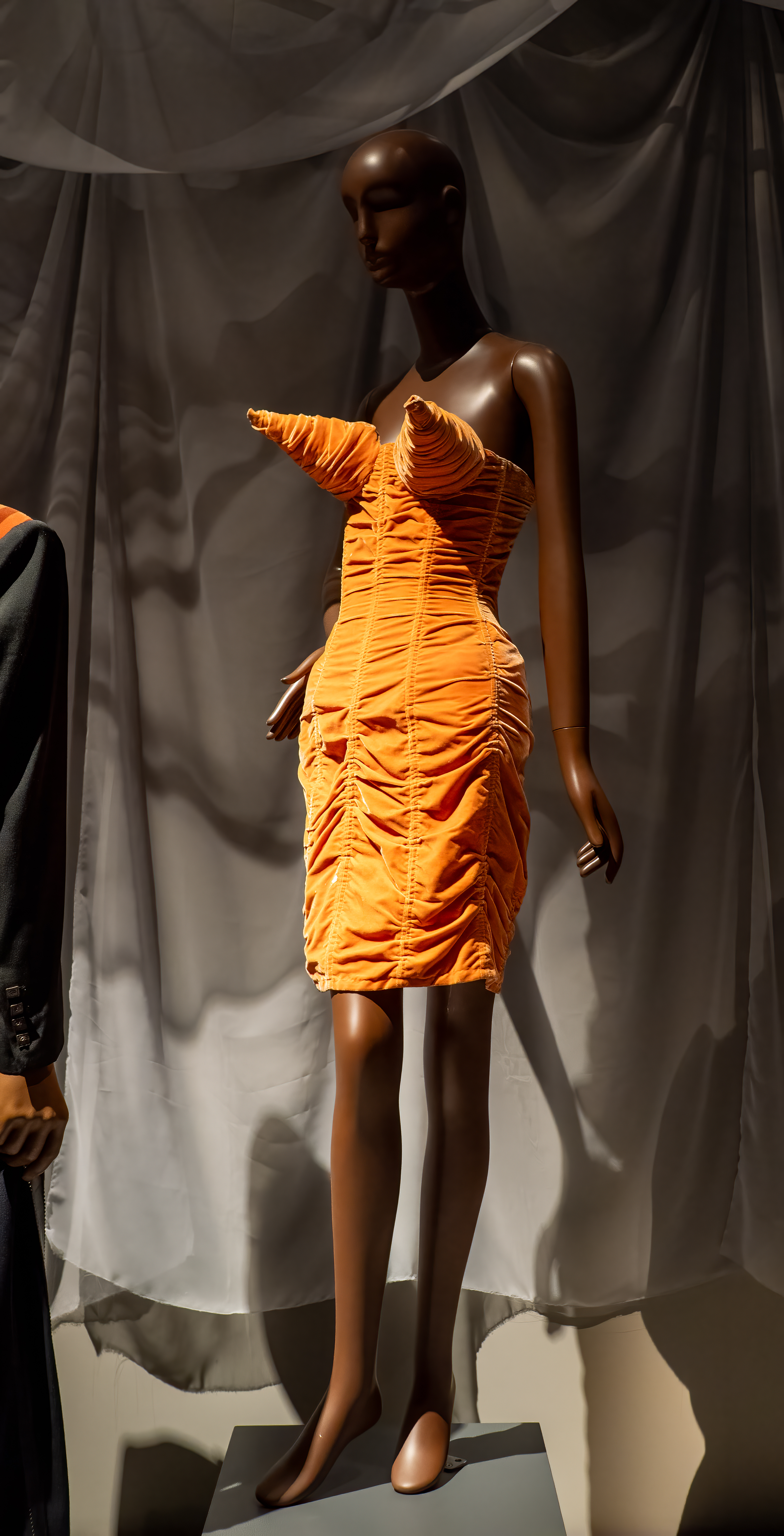
Gaultier's cone-bra dress

Gaultier's first individual collection was released in 1976. Although most people found his designs decadent at the time, fashion editors, notably Melka Tréanton of Elle, Claude Brouet and Catherine Lardeur of French Marie Claire, were impressed by his creativity and mastery of tailoring, and later launched his career. In 1980, he designed women's dresses out of plastic rubbish bags. Gaultier founded his eponymous fashion label in 1982. His 1983 collection "Boy Toy" relaunched the marinière for men. His garments were on sale at Bergdorf Goodman in New York as soon as 1984, and already lauded by Dawn Mello and Polly Allen Mellen. The term "Gaultiered" was coined to describe the classic pieces that were reinterpreted by the designer. During the 1984 Fall London and Paris shows, Jean Paul Gaultier introduced his line of skirts for men (actually kilts), a breakthrough in men's fashion that stirred a bit of controversy. In 1984, he also introduced the iconic women's corset with cone bra. Gaultier has also worked in close collaboration with Wolford Hosiery.

By 1985, his company made $50 million in sales worldwide. For the premiere of the 1985 movie Desperately Seeking Susan, Madonna wore a skirt with men's suspenders she had bought from Gaultier. Besides his ready-to-wear collection, in 1988 Gaultier expanded his brand to include the label Junior Gaultier, a lower-priced line of products. The Junior Gaultier outfit was selected by Jeff Banks as the Dress of the Year. In 1988, he also recorded the music video How to do that. At the end of the 1980s he invented a new look for the French accordionist Yvette Horner which relaunched her career. In 1989, he was tailoring a costume for Prince when the singer walked away, offended, thinking Gaultier had told him "fuck you" where the couturier with a heavy French accent had said "faux cul" (false bottom). In 1990, he designed Madonna's clothes for her Blond Ambition World Tour.

At the end of the 1980s, Gaultier suffered some personal losses, and in 1990 his boyfriend and business partner, Francis Menuge, died of AIDS-related causes. It is also around that time that he decided to tone down his showmanship and started to plan more intimate events.

Gaultier launched a line of fragrances (Classique) in 1993. The Junior Gaultier label was replaced in 1994 with JPG by Gaultier, a unisex collection that followed the designer's idea of fluidity of the sexes. Gaultier Jean's, a similar line consisting mainly of denim and more simply styled garments with a heavy street influence, followed in 1992, which was then replaced with Jean's Paul Gaultier from 2004 to 2008. Junior Gaultier's name was reused in 2009 for the launching of the child's wear, to be completed with a Baby Line in 2011.

In 1998, Jean Paul Gaultier's company generated €12.9 million ($13.2 million) in sales. In 1999, Hermès acquired 35% of Gaultier's label for 150 million francs ($23 million). Jean Paul Gaultier owned 93% of his company prior to this deal. In 2002, Gaultier's label opened its first fully-fledged stand-alone store. Then, from 2003 to 2010, Gaultier was the creative director of Hermès where he succeeded Martin Margiela. Hermès later increased its stake in Jean Paul Gaultier to 45%. By 2008, 40 Jean Paul Gaultier stores opened worldwide.

He sponsored the 2003–04 exhibit in the Costume Institute of New York's Metropolitan Museum of Art entitled "Braveheart: Men in Skirts", which showed designs by Dries van Noten, Vivienne Westwood, and Rudi Gernreich in addition to Gaultier's in order to examine "designers and individuals who have appropriated the skirt as a means of injecting novelty into male fashion, as a means of transgressing moral and social codes, and as a means of redefining an ideal masculinity." He also designed some furniture for the French furniture brand Roche Bobois and an Evian bottle in 2008. Gaultier's spring 2009 couture was influenced by the visual style of singer Klaus Nomi, and he used Nomi's recording of "Cold Song" in his runway show.

In 2011, the Montreal Museum of Fine Arts in collaboration with the Maison Jean Paul Gaultier organized a retrospective exhibit, "The Fashion World of Jean Paul Gaultier: From the Sidewalk to the Catwalk." That exhibit is on tour with venues at the Swedish Centre for Architecture and Design (Arkitektur- och designcentrum, ArkDes) in Stockholm, the Brooklyn Museum in New York City, the Barbican Centre in London, the National Gallery of Victoria in Melbourne, and the Grand Palais in Paris. The exhibition in Paris, which took place from April to August 2015, was the subject of a documentary called Jean Paul Gaultier at the Grand Palais aired exclusively on Eurochannel. In 2012, he participated in the Cali ExpoShow in Cali (Colombia), showing his extensive collection of perfumes and all classic clothes.

Up until 2014, he designed for three collections: his own couture and ready-to-wear lines, for both men and women. At the spring/summer 2015 show he announced that he was closing the ready-to-wear labels to focus on haute couture. In 2016, he designed more than 500 costumes for the revue THE ONE Grand Show at Friedrichstadt-Palast Berlin.

In 2018, he staged a cabaret show that was loosely based on his life called "Fashion Freak Show" which took place at the Folies Bergere theater in Paris. In 2019, Gaultier collaborated with the New York streetwear brand Supreme.

He announced on 17 January 2020 that his next Paris haute couture fashion show would be his last and that he was retiring from the runway. He announced his brand would be having a designer that rotates every season and chose Chitose Abe as the first.

=== Music and television ===
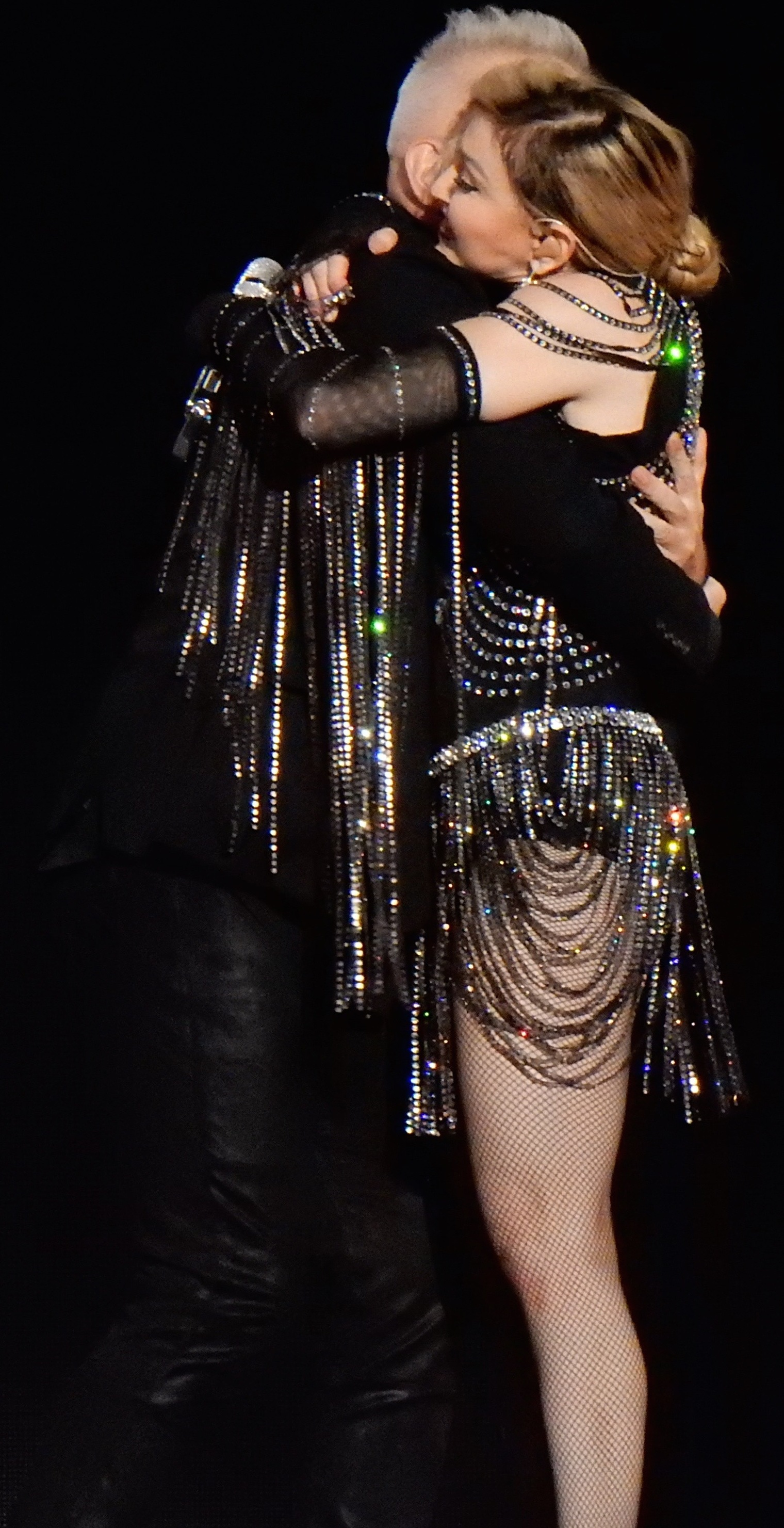
Gaultier with Madonna, 2015

In 1988, Gaultier released a dance single titled "How To Do That" on Fontana Records, from which came one of the first ever "single title" remix albums, Aow Tou Dou Zat, on Mercury Records. The album includes mixes by Norman Cook, J. J. Jeczalik, George Shilling, Mark Saunders, Latin Rascals, David Dorrell, Tim Atkins, Carl Atkins, and Kurtis Mantronik. It was co-written and produced by Tony Mansfield, and video directed by Jean-Baptiste Mondino. The album also featured a collaboration with accordion player Yvette Horner.

Gaultier is known as Eurovision enthusiast, and since 1991, he's dressed several of France's entrants. For the Eurovision Song Contest 2006, he dressed Greek entrant Anna Vissi, where she performed on homesoil. He commentated on the final of the 2008 contest with Julien Lepers on France Télévisions. He designed the dress that Anggun wore as she represented France during the grand-finals of the 2012 edition held in Baku, Azerbaijan. In Eurovision Song Contest 2013 he dressed the host Petra Mede.

Starting in 1993, he co-hosted the Channel 4 programme Eurotrash with Antoine de Caunes. Gaultier hosted the show until 1997.

In 2022, he appeared with Iris Mittenaere as a guest judge on Drag Race France.

== Products ==
Jean Paul Gaultier's logo

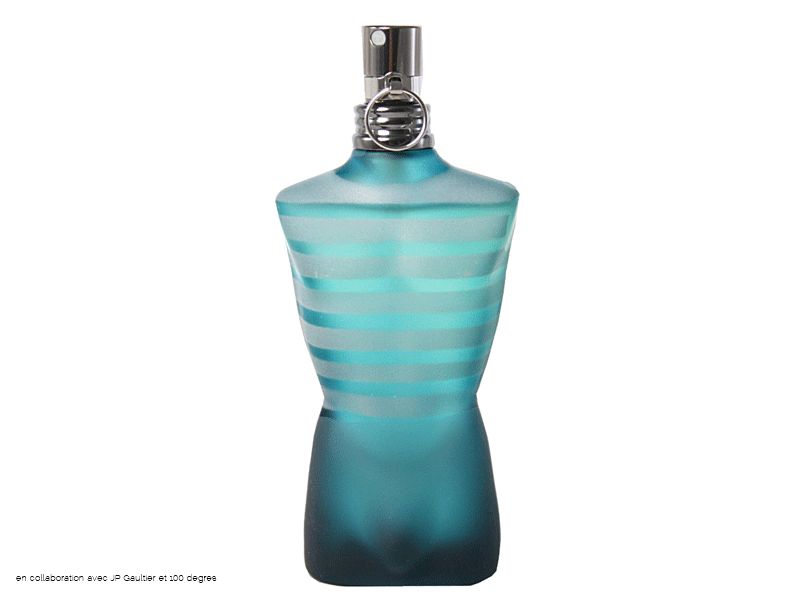
Bottle of the men's fragrance Le Male.

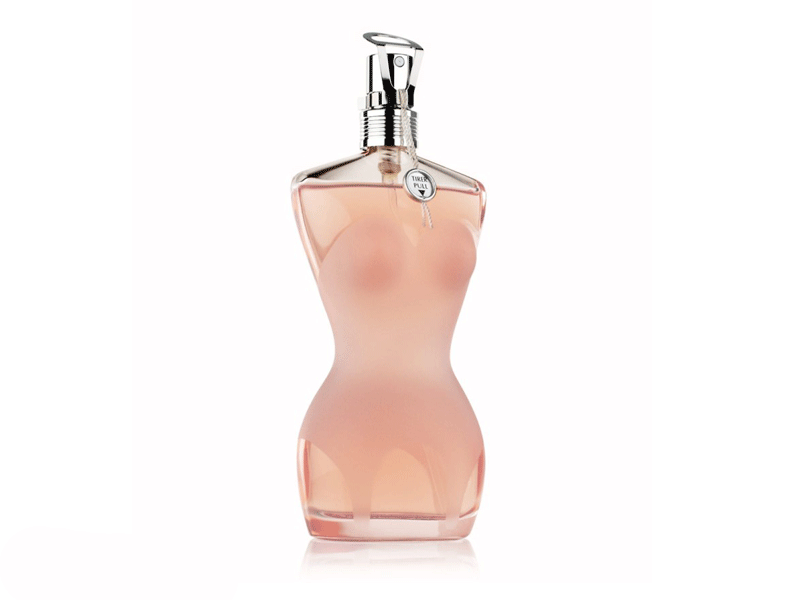
Bottle of the women's fragrance Classique.

Type		Brands
Fashion labels		Jean Paul Gaultier
Fashion labels		Gaultier PARIS (couture collection)
Fashion labels		former JEAN'S Paul Gaultier
Fashion labels		former Eyewear Jean Paul Gaultier
Fashion labels		former Jean Paul Gaultier Argent
Fragrance	Women	Classique (1993) -List of flanker fragrances
Fragrance	Women	Fragile (2000); Fragile Eau de Toilette (2001)
Fragrance	Women	Ma Dame (2008); Ma Dame Eau Fraiche (2009); Ma Dame Rose 'n Roll (2009); Ma Dame Eau de Parfum (2010); Ma Dame Eau Fraiche Summer 2010; Ma Dame It (2011)
Fragrance	Women	Scandal (2017); Scandal by Night (2018); Scandal a Paris (2019); So Scandal! (2020)
Fragrance	Men	Le Male (1995) - List of flanker fragrances
Fragrance	Men	Monsieur (2008)
Fragrance	Men	Kokorico (2011); Kokorico by Night (2012)
Fragrance	Men	Scandal Pour Homme (2021)
Fragrance	Unisex	Gaultier² (2005); Gaultier² Eau d'Amour (2008)

Jean Paul Gaultier fragrances have been licensed by Puig since 1 January 2016, and were previously licensed by Shiseido subsidiary Beauté Prestige International from 1991 through 31 December 2015. The BPI license was originally negotiated through 30 June 2016; however, Puig acquired the license for $79.2 million and paid $22.6 million for the early termination of the license. With this purchase, Puig now holds control of both the fashion and fragrance divisions of the Jean Paul Gaultier brand. The 1993 women's oriental floral Classique and the 1995 men's oriental fougere Le Male have been described by the brand as "flagship" products that "represent all the Jean Paul Gaultier values". Le Male was the top-selling men's fragrance in the European Union in 2012, and holds a strong market position in Australia and the United States.

As of May 2020, the Classique, Le Male, and Scandal lines are in production.

== Style ==
Jean Paul Gaultier's characteristic irreverent style dating from 1981 has led to his being known as the enfant terrible of French fashion.

Many of Gaultier's subsequent collections have been based on street wear, focusing on popular culture, whereas others, particularly his haute couture collections, are very formal, yet at the same time unusual and playful. Jean Paul Gaultier says he is inspired by the baby boomers' TV culture, and the street culture where audacity sometimes triggers new trends. His main inspirations are French popular culture, the mixing of types and genders, sexual fetishism and futurist designs.

The advent of his haute couture line brought him massive success in 1997. Through this collection, he was able to freely express the scope and range of his aesthetic, drawing inspiration from radically divergent cultures, from Imperial India to Hasidic Judaism.

Gaultier caused shock by using unconventional models for his exhibitions, like older men and fat women, pierced and heavily tattooed models, and by playing with traditional gender roles in the shows. This earned him both criticism and enormous popularity. The "granny grey" hair colour trend is attributed to Gaultier, whose autumn/winter 2011 show featured models in grey beehives. In the spring of 2015, his catwalk show at Paris Fashion Week featured silver-haired models again, as did the shows of other fashion designers, Chanel and Gareth Pugh. The trend soon took off among celebrities and the general public.

=== Notable designs ===
- Madonna: Gaultier produced sculptured costumes during the nineties, starting with her infamous cone bra for her 1990 Blond Ambition World Tour, the wardrobe for her 2006 Confessions Tour, the corset worn during the 2012 MDNA Tour, and one worn during the 2023 Celebration Tour.
- Björk: The Icelandic artist modeled for him in 1994, and appeared on this occasion in Robert Altman's film Prêt à Porter.
- Marilyn Manson: Gaultier has designed some of the costumes and outfits, including for The Golden Age of Grotesque album.
- Mylène Farmer: In spring 2008 he signed a contract to be the fashion designer for her tour in 2009.
- Kerry Washington: Dress worn at the 2007 Cannes Film Festival.
- Marion Cotillard: He designed the white and silver mermaid dress she wore at the 80th Academy Awards in 2008 (Oscar for her performance in La Vie en Rose).
- Lady Gaga: VMAs red carpet in 2009.
- Rihanna : Grammys red carpet in 2011, couture dress worn at the American Music Awards in 2013.
- Beyoncé: In the "Run The World (Girls)" music video in 2011.
- Nicki Minaj.
- Kylie Minogue: He designed the costumes for the international KylieX2008 tour.
- Leslie Cheung: Gaultier designed eight costumes for his last concert tour in 2000.
- Nik Thakkar: Gaultier created a digital first working with the artist and activist in 2013.
- Tupac Shakur: Wore a leather utility vest designed by Gaultier for the cover shot of "All Eyez on Me" (1996).
- Kim Kardashian: Grammys red carpet in 2015.
- Katy Perry: Vanity Fair after-party in early 2017.
- Solange Knowles: 2017 Glamour Women of the Year Awards in New York City.

=== Gallery ===
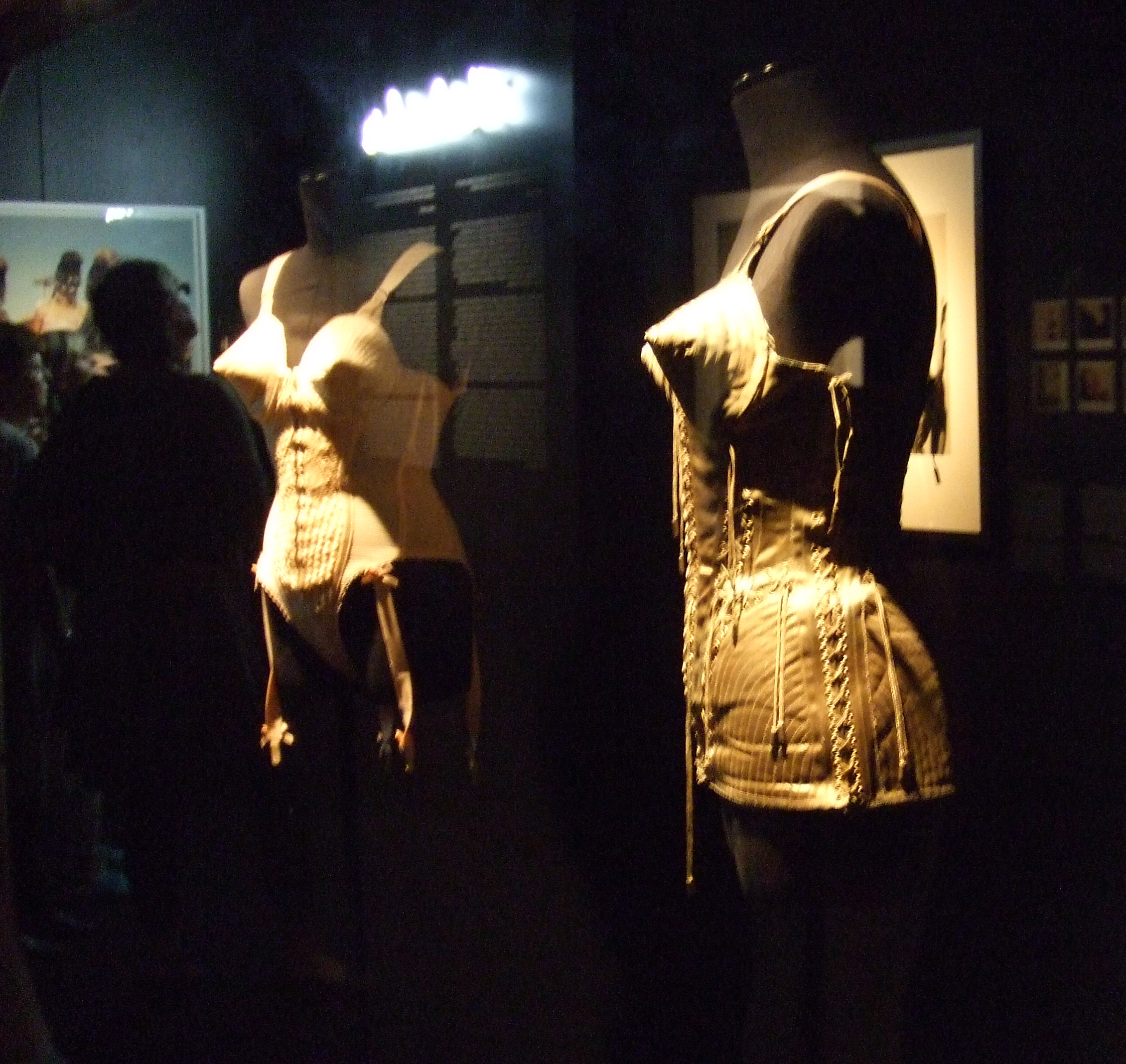
Madonna's trademark corset with cone bra from the exhibition at the ArkDes, 2013

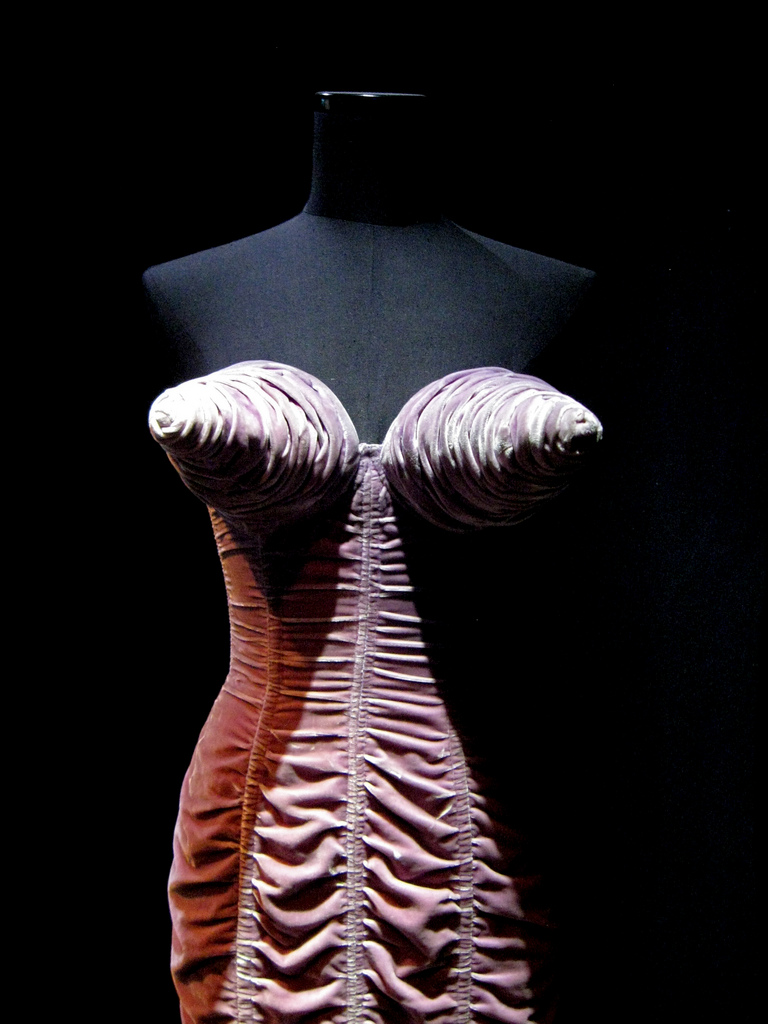
Gaultier's notoriety increased in the 1980s with several cone-breasted designs, similar to one worn on tour by Madonna.

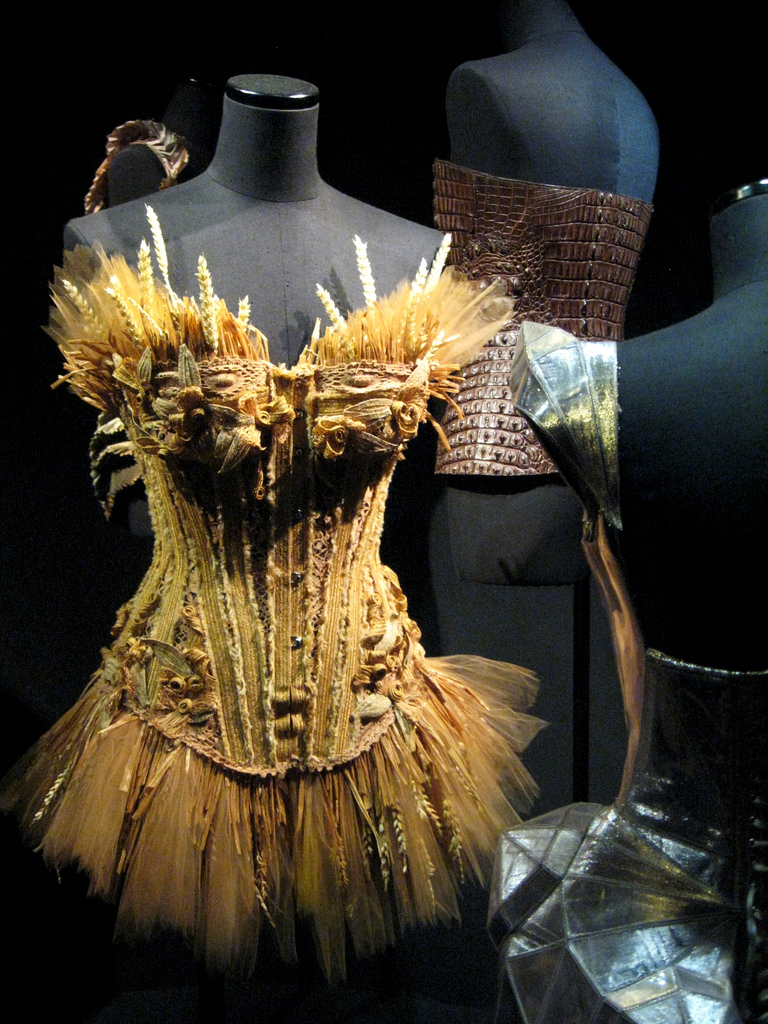
A bustier-style dress made of grass that is woven to resemble feathers

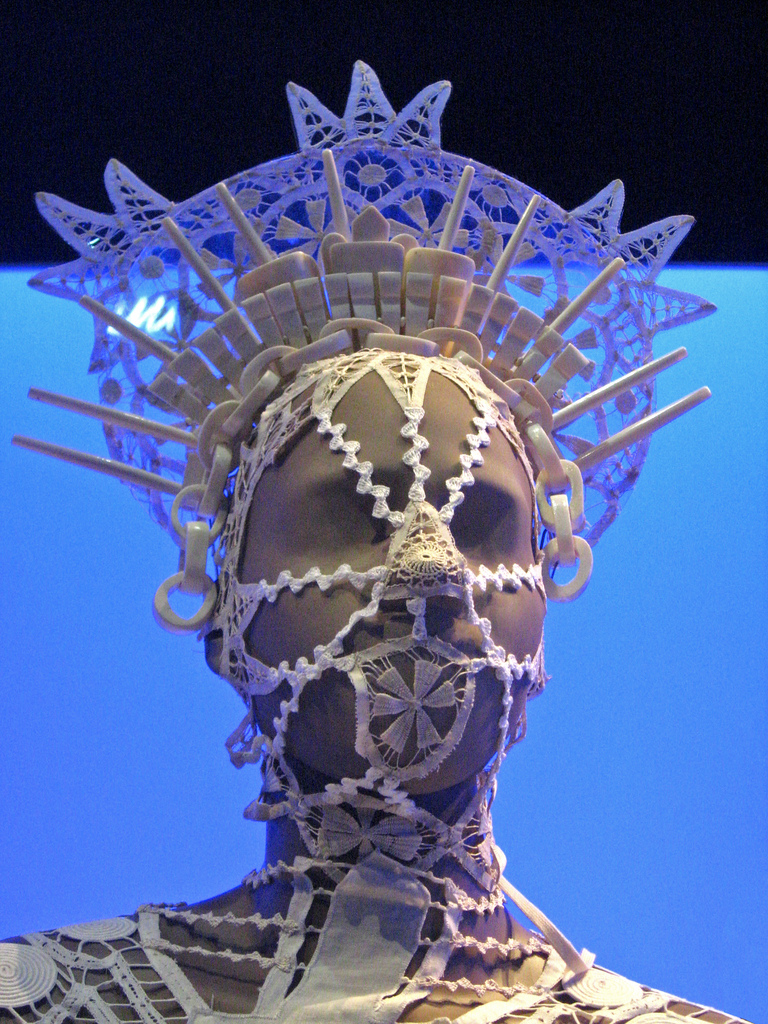
An iconoclastic white lace design combining a halo and mask similar to fetish bondage-wear

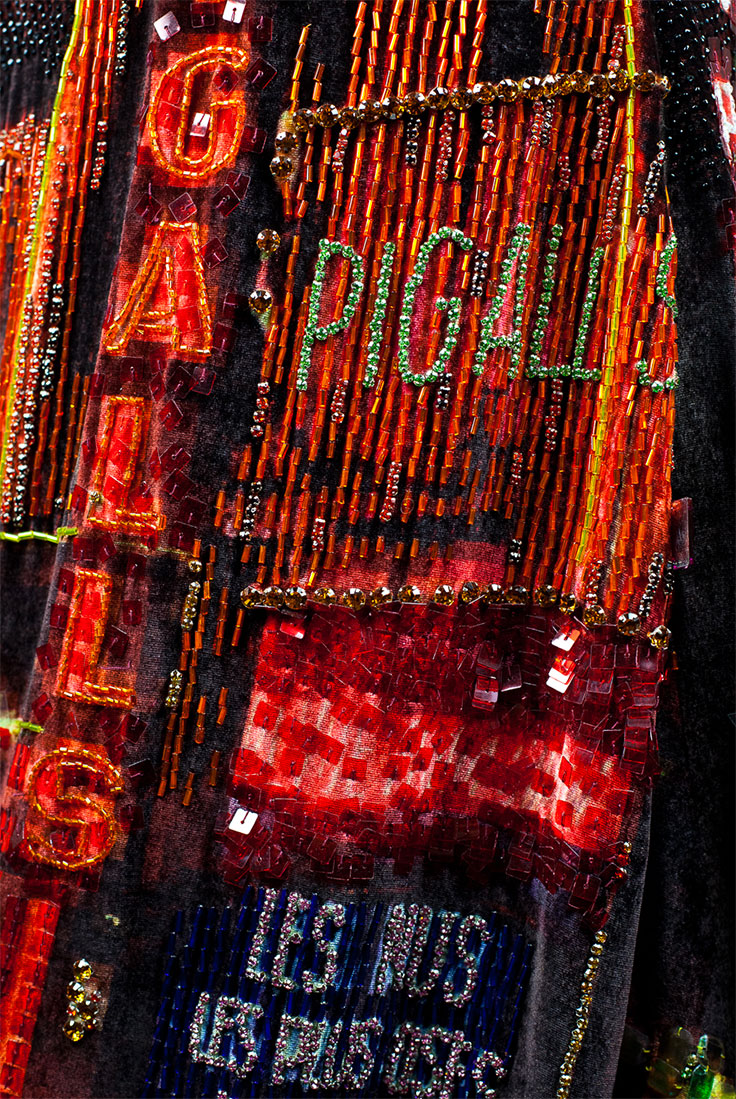
Jean Paul Gaultier freak show

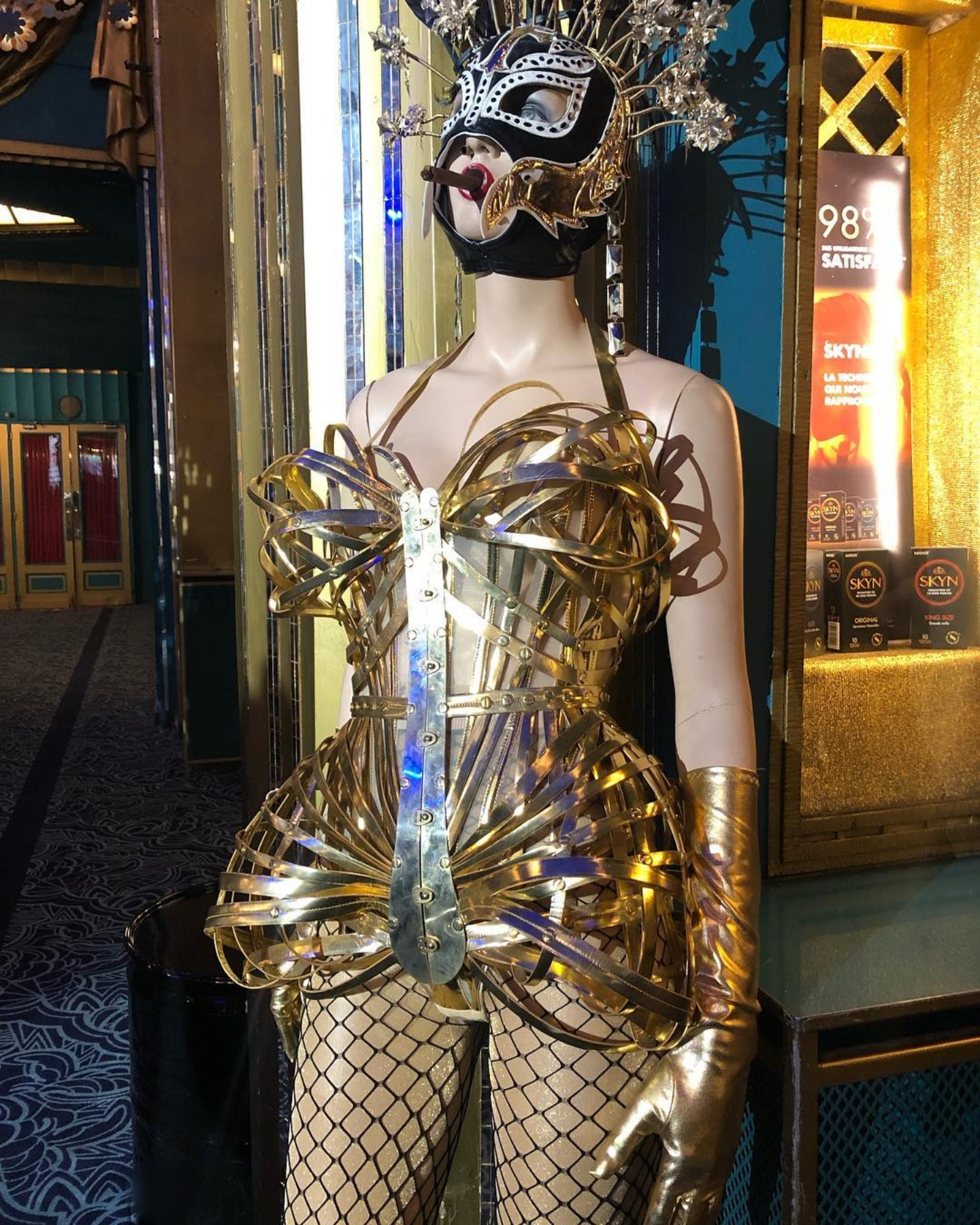
Designed by Jean Paul Gaultier for the fashion freak show 2019

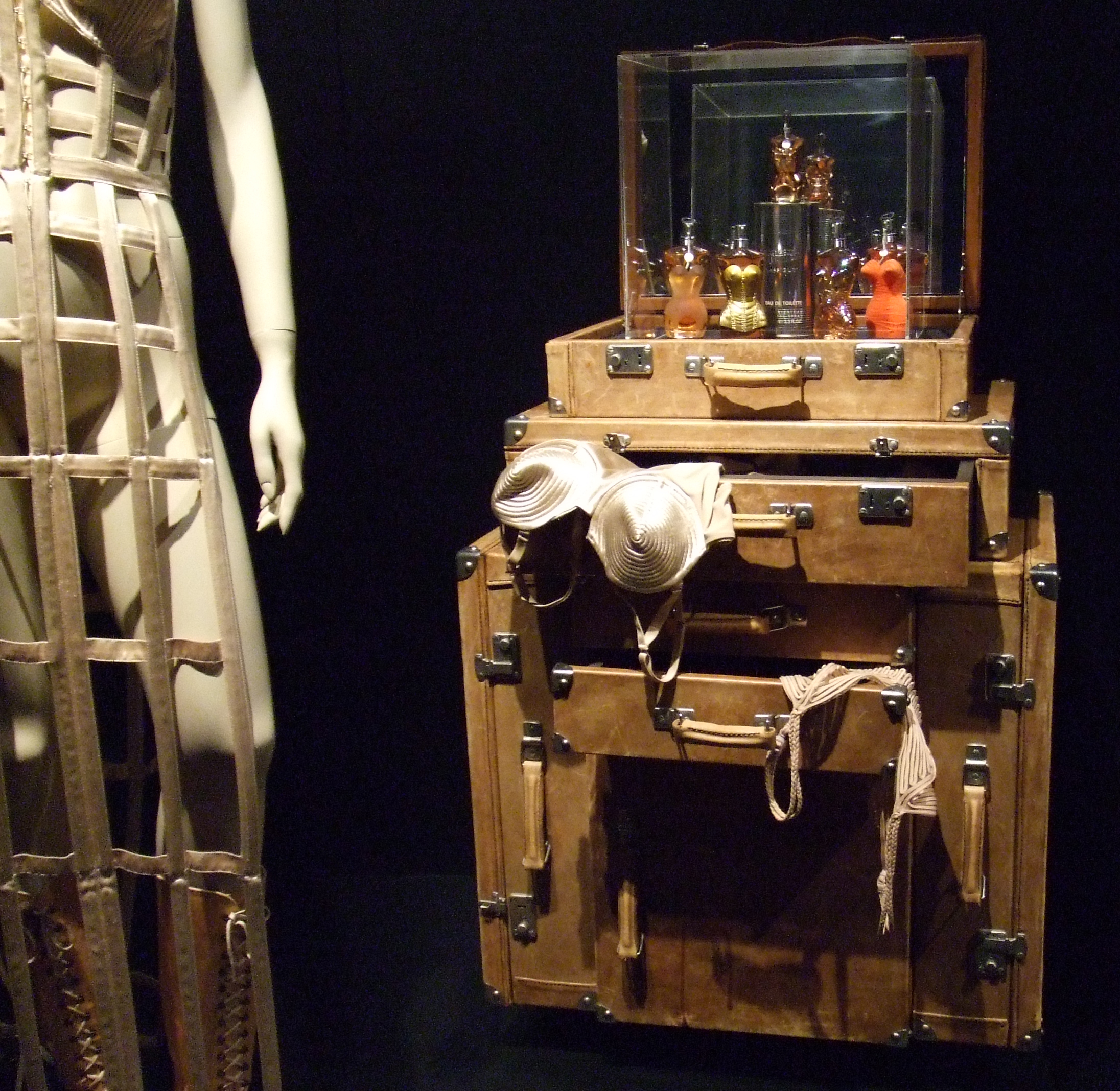
Chest of drawers made from old suitcases made by Jean Paul Gaultier. From the exhibition "The Fashion World of Jean Paul Gaultier: From the Sidewalk to the Catwalk", at the Swedish Centre for Architecture and Design in Stockholm 2013.

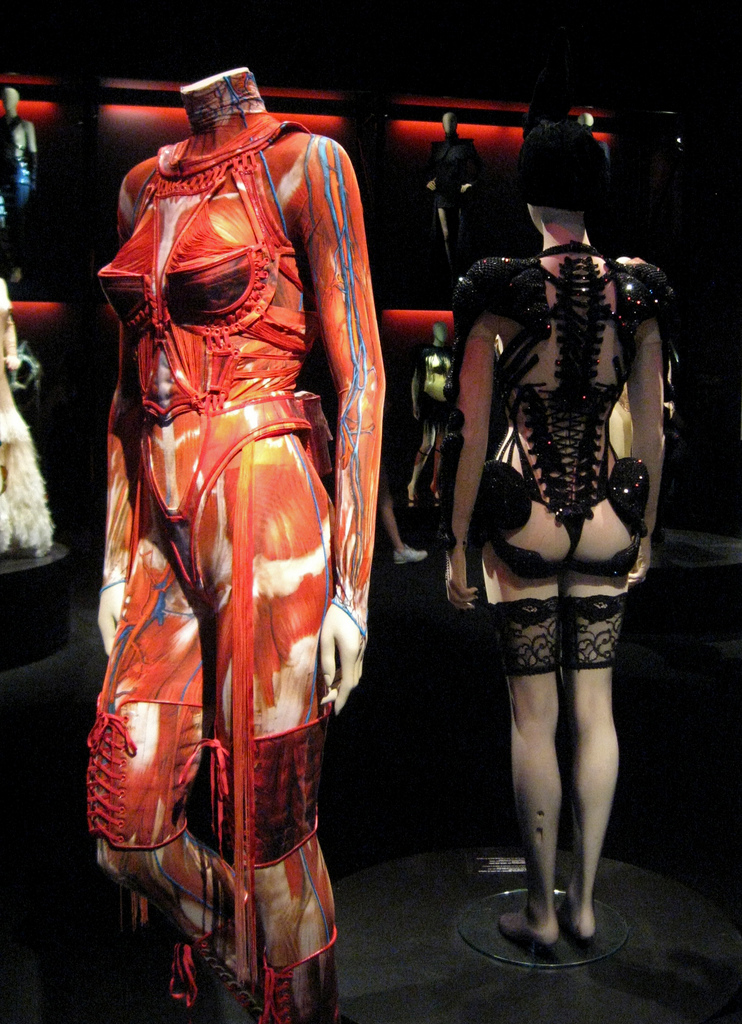
Designs resembling the human muscle and circulatory systems worn by Mylène Farmer (left) and torsolette, or "merry widow" undergarments (right)

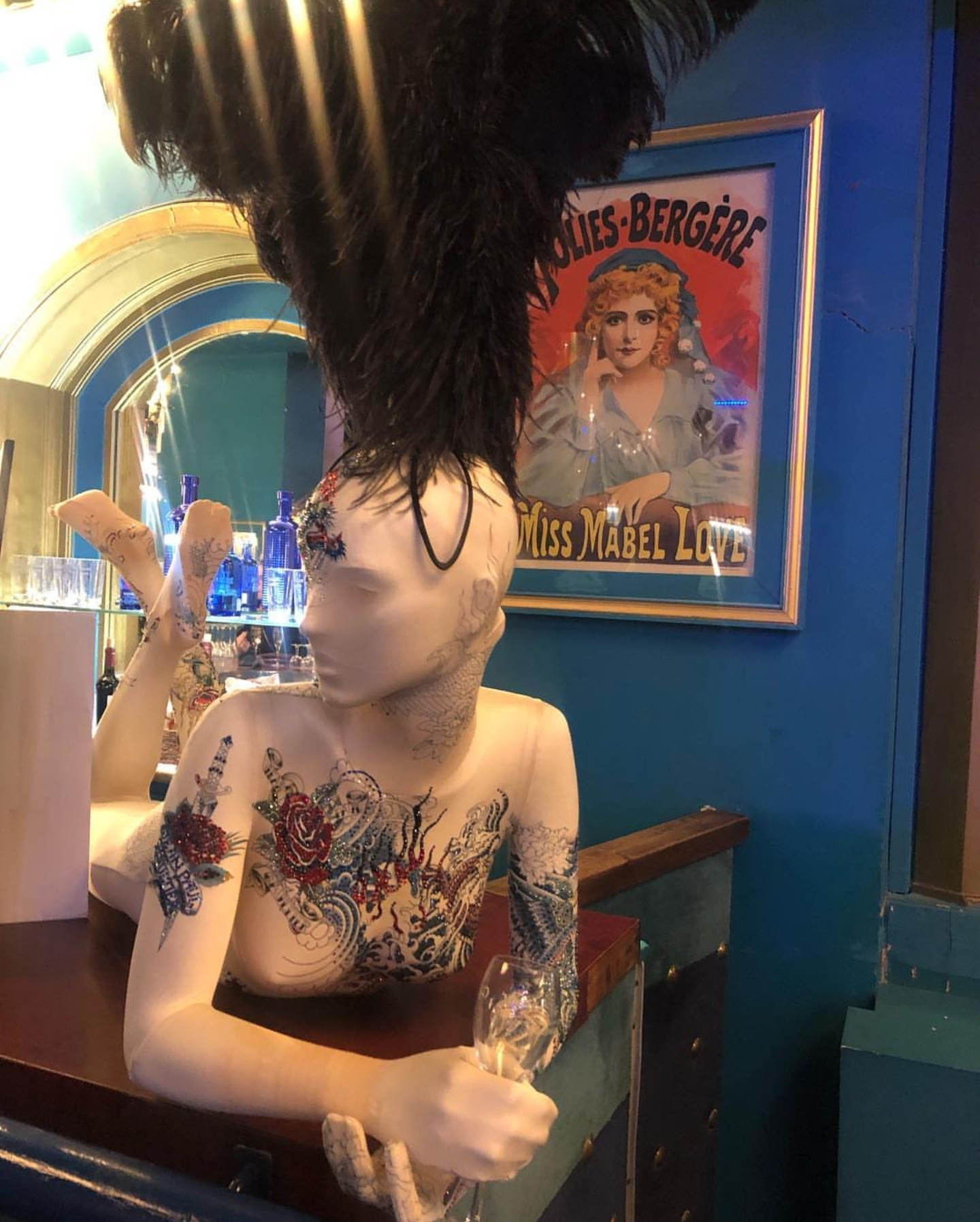
Gaultier the fashion freak show

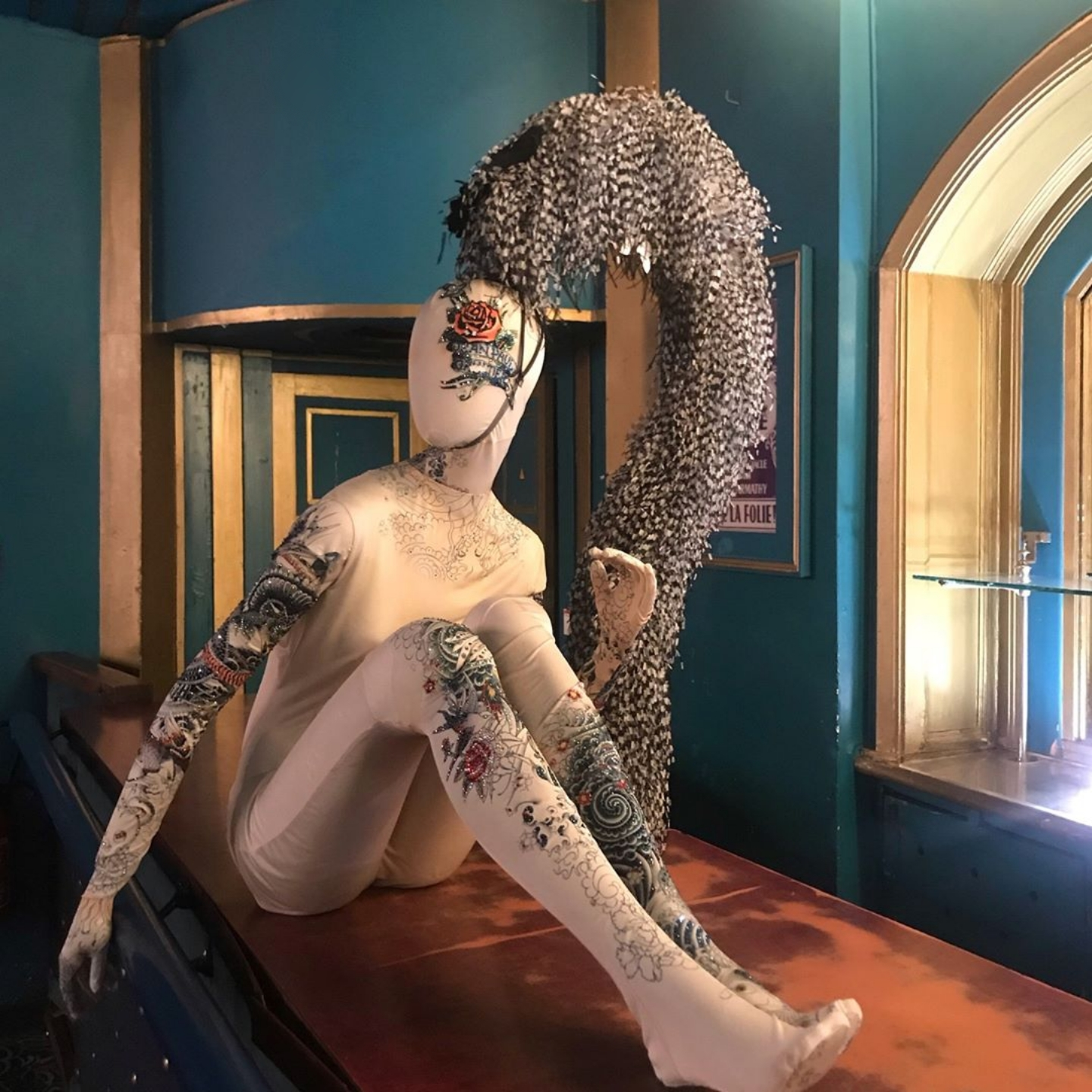
Jean'Paul Gaultier (the fashion freak show)

== Filmography ==
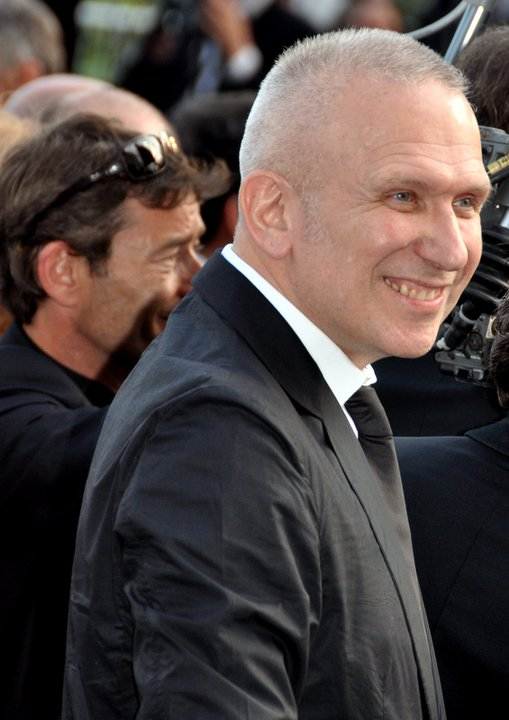
Gaultier at the 2011 Cannes Film Festival.

In 2012, Gaultier was a member of the jury for the main competition at the 2012 Cannes Film Festival, the first time a fashion designer was called to sit on a jury at the festival.

In 2024, he announced the production and imminent launch of his first feature animation film.

=== Actor ===
Year	Title	Role	Notes
1993	Eurotrash	Presenter	TV series
2001	Absolument fabuleux	Le créateur	
2016	Absolutely Fabulous: The Movie	Himself	
2019	Huge in France (episode 7)	Himself	Netflix TV series
2019	House of Cardin	Himself	Feature documentary film on Pierre Cardin
2022	Drag Race France (episode 1)	Guest judge	

=== Costume designer ===
Year	Title	Director
1989	The Cook, the Thief, His Wife & Her Lover	Peter Greenaway
1993	Kika	Pedro Almodóvar
1995	The City of Lost Children	Marc Caro, Jean-Pierre Jeunet
1997	The Fifth Element	Luc Besson
2004	Bad Education	Pedro Almodóvar
2011	The Skin I Live In	Pedro Almodóvar
