= Communal violence =

Violence between ethnic or other communal groups

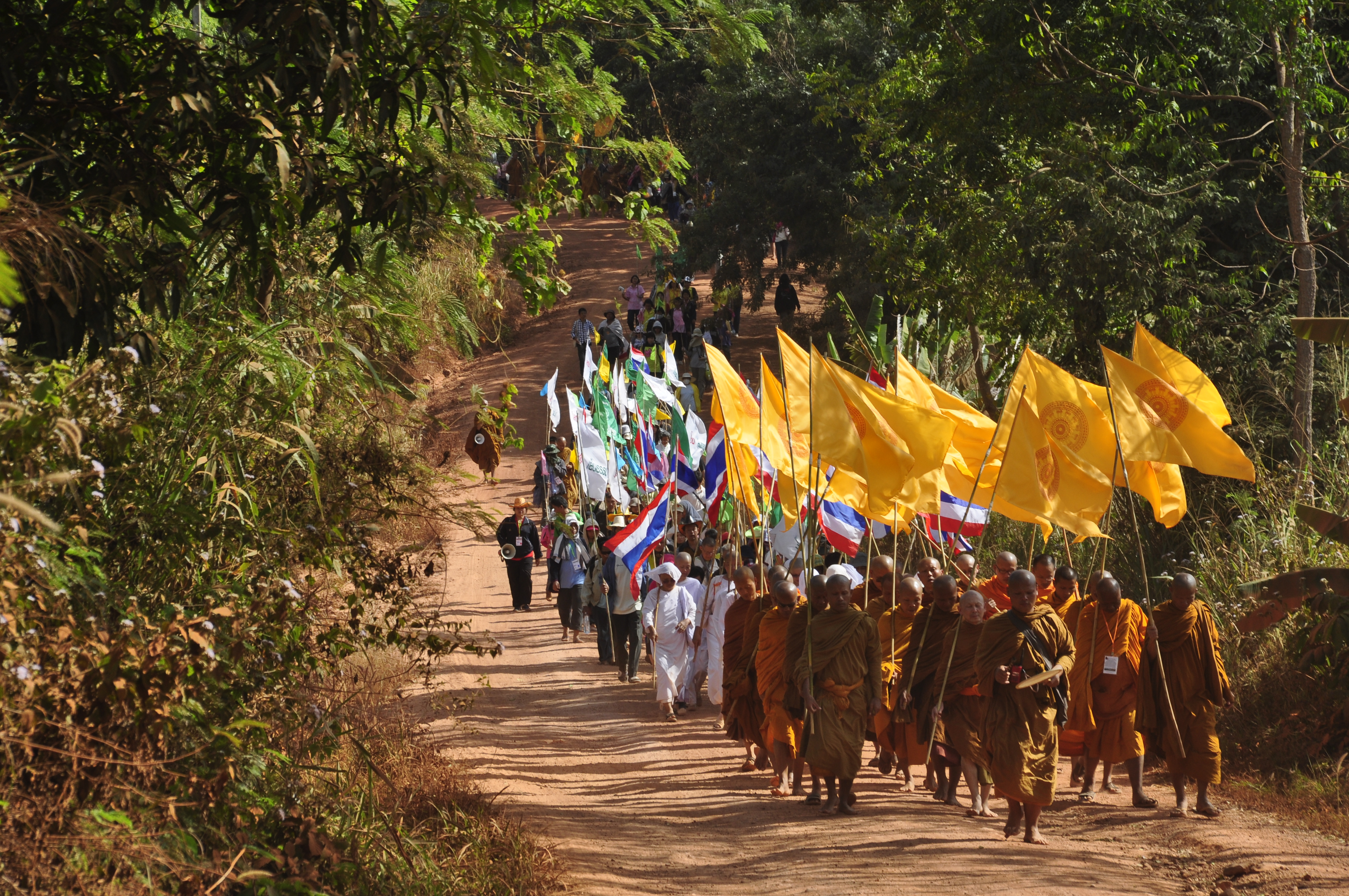
Dhammayietra, an annual peace march in Lampatao, Cambodia at Thailand border against communal violence.

Communal violence is a form of violence that is perpetrated across ethnic or communal lines, where the violent parties feel solidarity for their respective groups and victims are chosen based upon group membership. The term includes conflicts, riots and other forms of violence between communities of different religious faith or ethnic origins.

United Nations Office on Drugs and Crime includes any conflict and form of violence between communities of different religious groups, different sects or tribes of same religious group, clans, ethnic origins or national origin as communal violence. However, this excludes conflict between two individuals or two families.

Communal violence is found in Africa, the Americas, Asia, Europe and Oceania.

The term "communal violence" was coined by European colonial authorities as they wrestled to manage outbreaks of violence between religious, ethnic and disparate groups in their colonies, particularly Africa and South Asia, in early 20th century.

Communal violence, in different parts of the world, is alternatively referred to as ethnic violence, religious violence, non-State conflict, violent civil disorder, minorities unrest, mass racial violence, inter-communal violence and ethno-religious violence.

== History ==
=== Europe ===
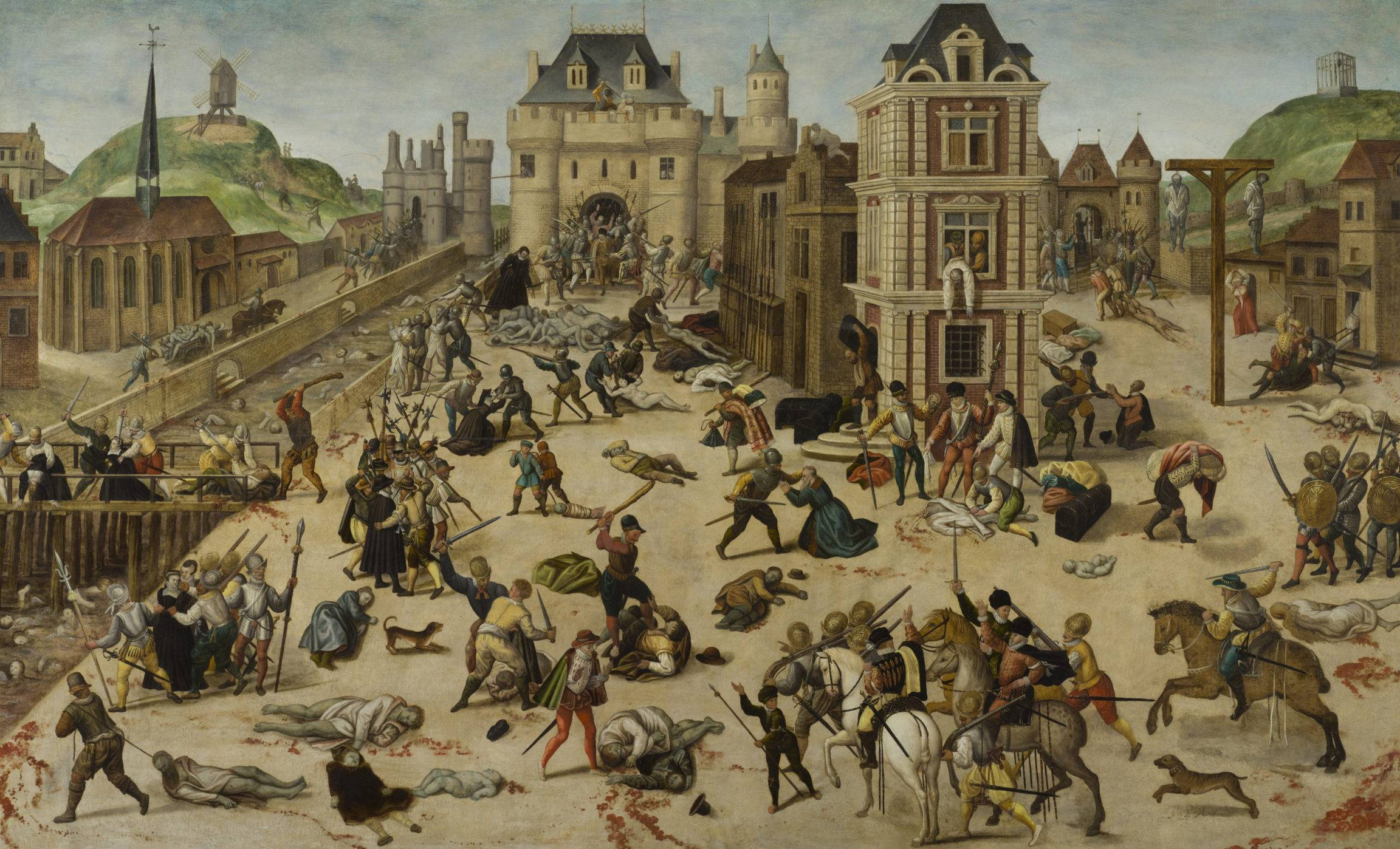
A painting by François Dubois depicting the communal violence in France during the Saint Bartholomew's Day Massacre. Over two months in 1572, Catholics killed tens of thousands of Huguenots in France.

Human history has experienced numerous episodes of communal violence. For example, in medieval Europe, Protestants clashed with Catholics, Christians clashed with Muslims, and Christians perpetuated violence against Jews and Roma. In 1561, Huguenots in Toulouse took out in a procession through the streets to express their solidarity for Protestant ideas. A few days later, the Catholics hunted down some of the leaders of the procession, beat them and burned them at the stake. In the French town of Pamiers, communal clashes were routine between Protestants and Catholics, such as during holy celebrations where the Catholics took out a procession with a statue of St. Anthony, sang and danced while they carried the statue around town. Local Protestants would year after year disrupt the festivities by throwing stones at the Catholics. In 1566, when the Catholic procession reached a Protestant neighborhood, the Protestants chanted "kill, kill, kill !!" and days of communal violence with numerous fatalities followed. In 1572, thousands of Protestants were killed by Catholics during communal violence in each of the following cities – Paris, Aix, Bordeaux, Bourges, Lyon, Meaux, Orleans, Rouen, Toulouse, and Troyes. In Switzerland, communal violence between the Reformation movement and Catholics marked the 16th century. Ireland has a long history of communal violence with the period between July 1920 and July 1922 being particularly violent. This period of time saw the partition of Ireland and the establishment of Northern Ireland. The violence that occurred during this time in several towns/cities within Northern Ireland has been referred to as the Belfast Pogrom.

=== Africa ===
The Horn of Africa and Western Africa have a similar history of communal violence. Nigeria has seen centuries of communal violence between different ethnic groups particularly between Christian south and Islamic north. In 1964, after receiving independence from British rule, there were widespread communal violence in the ethnically diverse state of Zanzibar. The violent groups were Arabs and Africans, that expanded along religious lines, and the communal violence ultimately led to the overthrow of the Sultan of Zanzibar. Local radio announced the death of tens of thousands of "stooges", but later estimates for deaths from Zanzibar communal violence have varied from hundreds to 2,000-4,000 to as many as 20,000. In late 1960s and early 1970s, there were widespread communal violence against Kenyans and Asians in Uganda with waves of theft, physical and sexual violence, followed by expulsions by Idi Amin. Idi Amin mentioned his religion as justification for his actions and the violence. Coptic Christians have suffered communal violence in Egypt for decades, with frequency and magnitude increasing since the 1920s.

=== Asia ===
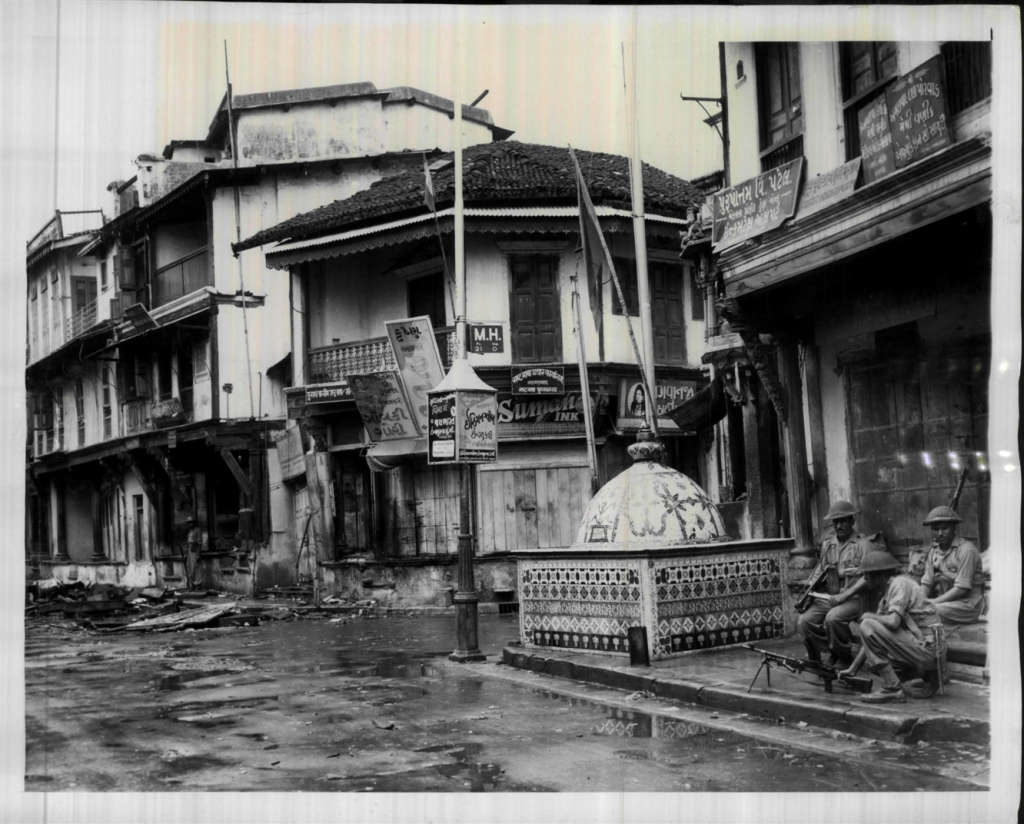
Arson and communal violence of 1946 between Muslims and Jains, in Ahmedabad, Gujarat.

Communalism is a term historically used to denote attempts to construct religious or ethnic identity, incite strife between people identified as different communities, and to foment communal violence between those groups, particularly in Asia. It derives from history, differences in beliefs, and tensions between the communities. Communalism is a significant social issue in India, Bangladesh, Pakistan and Sri Lanka. Recent, communal conflicts between religious communities in India, Pakistan and Bangladesh, especially Hindus and Muslims have occurred since the period of British colonial rule, occasionally leading to serious inter-communal violence.

The term communalism was coined by the British colonial government as it wrestled to manage Hindu-Muslim riots and other violence between religious, ethnic and disparate groups in its colonies, particularly in British West Africa and the Cape Colony, in the early years of the 20th century.

The 4th Earl of Minto was called the father of communal electorates for legalising communalism by the Morley-Minto Act in 1909. The All-India Muslim League and the Hindu Mahasabha represented such communal interests, and the Indian National Congress represented an overarching "nationalist" vision. In the runup to independence in 1947, communalism and nationalism came to be competing ideologies and led to the division of British India into Pakistan and the Republic of India. British historians have attributed the cause of the partition to the communalism of Jinnah.

East, South and Southeast Asia have recorded numerous instances of communal violence. For example, Singapore suffered a wave of communal violence in 20th century between Malays and Chinese. In the Indian subcontinent, numerous 18th through 20th century records of the British colonial administration mention communal violence between Hindus and Muslims, as well as Sunni and Shia sects of Islam, particularly during processions related to respective religious celebrations.

The frequency of communal violence in South Asia increased after the first partition of Bengal in 1905, where segregation, unequal political and economic rights were imposed on Hindus and Muslims by Lord Curzon, based on religion. The colonial government was viewed by each side as favoring the other side, resulting in a wave of communal riots and 1911 reversal of Bengal partition and its re-unification. In 1919, after General Dyer ordered his soldiers to fire on unarmed protestors inside a compound in Amritsar, killing 380 civilians, communal violence followed in India against British migrants. There were hundreds of incidents of communal violence between 1905 and 1947, many related to religious, political sovereignty questions including partition of India along religious lines into East Pakistan, West Pakistan and India. The 1946 to 1947 period saw some of the worst communal violence of 20th century, where waves of riots and violence killed between 100,000 and a million people, from Hindu, Muslim, Sikh and Jain religions. Examples of this communal violence include the Jammu massacres and the Rawalpindi massacres.

It has recently been argued that in the post-colonial era, communal riots between the Hindus and the Muslims contributed to the making of Muslim ghettos in those cities that had witnessed sustained communal mobilizations. It has furthermore been shown that the communalized real estate market, urban planning, and communal mobilizations often come to constitute each other in developing spatial majoritarianism.

The 20th century witnessed inter-religious, intra-religious and ethnic communal violence in the Middle East, South Russia, Eastern Europe, Central Asia, South Asia and Southeast Asia.

== National laws ==
=== India ===
The Indian law defines communal violence as, "any act or series of acts, whether spontaneous or planned, resulting in injury or harm to the person and or property, knowingly directed against any person by virtue of his or her membership of any religious or linguistic minority, in any State in the Union of India, or Scheduled Castes and Scheduled Tribes within the meaning of clauses (24) and (25) of Article 366 of the Constitution of India"

=== Indonesia ===
In Indonesia, communal violence is defined as that is driven by a sense of religious, ethnic or tribal solidarity. The equivalence of tribalism to ethnicity was referred locally as kesukuan. Communal violence in Indonesia includes numerous localized conflicts between various social groups found on its islands.

=== Kenya ===
In Kenya, communal violence is defined as that violence that occurs between different community who identify themselves based on religion, tribes, language, sect, race and others. Typically this sense of community identity comes from birth and is inherited. Similar definition has been applied for 47 African countries, where during 1990–2010, about 7,200 instances of communal violence and inter-ethnic conflicts has been seen.

== Causes ==
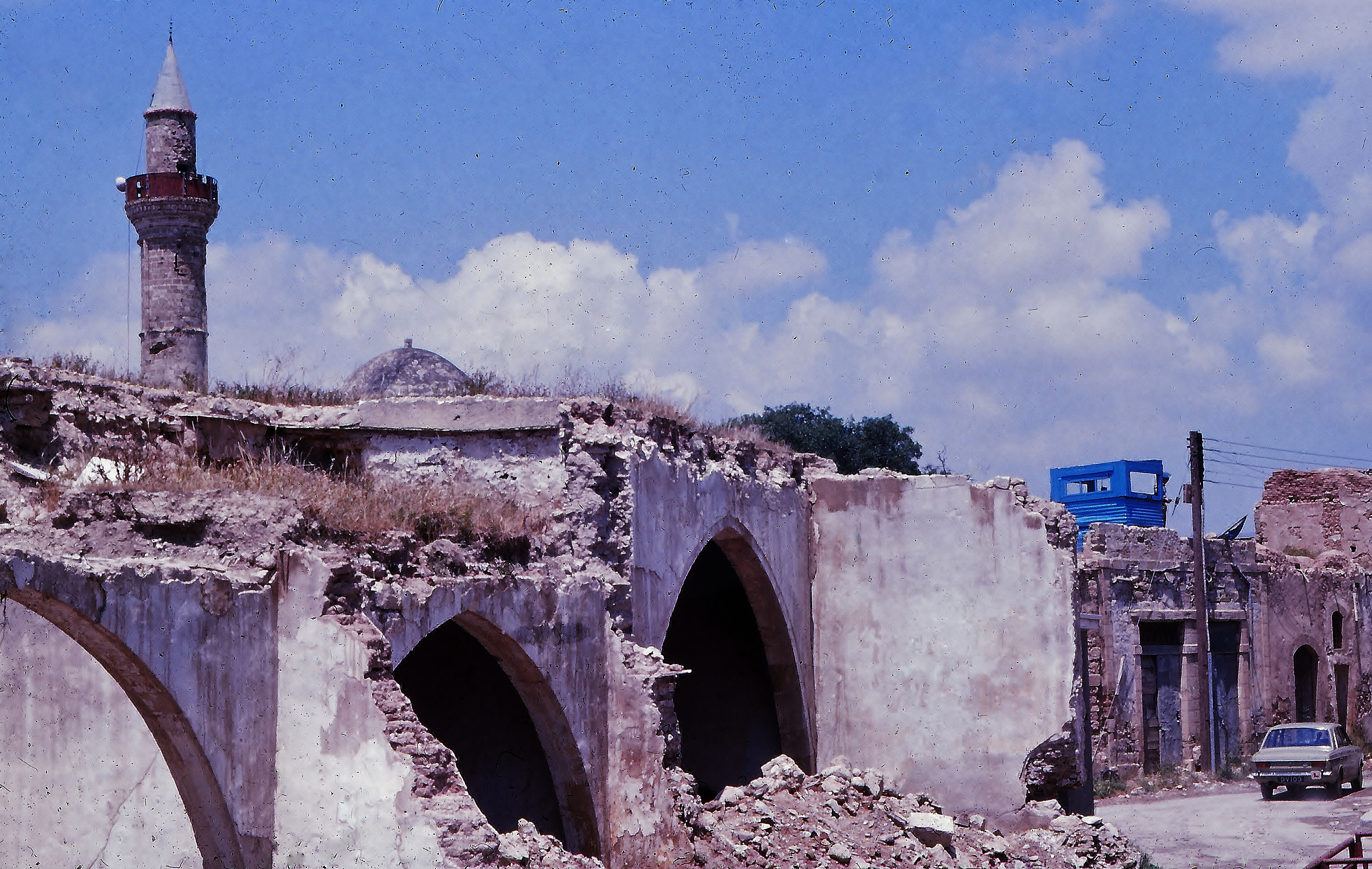
Damage from communal violence between Christian Greeks and Muslim Turks in Cyprus.

Colm Campbell has proposed, after studying the empirical data and sequence of events during communal violence in South Africa, Palestinian Territories and Northern Ireland, that communal violence typically follows when there is degradation of rule of law, the state fails to or is widely seen as unable to provide order, security and equal justice, which then leads to mass mobilization, followed by radicalization of anger among one or more communities, and ultimately violent mobilization. Targeted mass violence by a few from one community against innocent members of other community, suppression of complaints, refusal to prosecute, killing peaceful demonstrators, imprisonment of people of a single community while refusal to arrest members of other community in conflict, perceived or actual prisoner abuse by the state are often the greatest mobilizers of communal violence.

Research suggests that ethnic segregation may also cause communal violence. Empirically estimating the effect of segregation on the incidence of violence across 700 localities in Rift Valley Province of Kenya after the contested 2007–2008 general election, Kimuli Kahara finds that local ethnic segregation increases communal violence by decreasing interethnic trust rather than by making it easier to organize violence. Even if a small minority of individuals prefer to live in ethnically homogenous settings due to fear of other ethnic groups or otherwise, it can result in high degrees of ethnic segregation. Kahara argues that such ethnic segregation decreases the possibility of positive contact across ethnic lines. Integration and the resultant positive interethnic contact reduces prejudice by allowing individuals to correct false beliefs about members of other ethnic groups, improving intergroup relations consequently. Thus, segregation is correlated with low levels of interethnic trust. This widespread mistrust along ethnic lines explains the severity of communal violence by implying that when underlying mistrust is high, it is easier for extremists and elites to mobilize support for violence, and that where violence against members of other ethnic groups is supported by the public, perpetrators of such violence are less likely to face social sanctions.

== Alternate names ==
In China, the communal violence in Xinjiang province is called ethnic violence. Communal violence and riots have also been called non-State conflict, violent civil or minorities unrest, mass racial violence, social or inter-communal violence and ethno-religious violence.

== See also ==
- Anti-Hindu sentiment
- Anti-Mosque campaign in India
- Ayodhya dispute (India)
- Citizenship (Amendment) Act, 2019 (India)
- Communal conflicts in Nigeria
- Ethnic cleansing in Bhutan
- Ethnic conflict
- Ethnic relations in India
- Hate group
- Hindutva pseudohistory
- Sectarian violence between Tibetans and Hui Muslims
- July 2009 Ürümqi riots – Described as Communal riots
- Language conflicts in India
- List of ethnic riots
- NCERT textbook controversies (India)
- Pogrom
- Religion in India
- Religious harmony in India
- Religious violence in India
- Rohingya conflict (Myanmar)
- Saffronisation
- Saffron Terror
- Sectarian violence
- Sectarianism
- Secularism in India
- Structural abuse
- Structural violence
- Tarakan riot
- Terrorism in India
- The Troubles
- The Last King of Scotland

== Bibliography ==
- Bayly, C. A. (1985). "The Pre-history of 'Communalism'? Religious Conflict in India, 1700-1860". Modern Asian Studies. 19 (2): 177–203. doi:10.1017/S0026749X00012300. S2CID 106402178.
- Gould, William (2011). Religion and Conflict in Modern South Asia. Cambridge University Press. ISBN 978-1-139-49869-2.
- Heath, Deana; Mathur, Chandana, eds. (2010), Communalism and Globalization in South Asia and Its Diaspora Intersections: Colonial and Postcolonial Histories, Routledge, ISBN 9781136867873 – via Google Books
- Pandey, Gyanendra (1992). The Construction of Communalism in Colonial North India. Oxford University Press. ISBN 0195630106 – via Google Books.
- Talbot, Ian (2007). "Religion and violence: The historical context for conflict in Pakistan". In Hinnells, John; King, Richard (eds.). Religion and Violence in South Asia: Theory and Practice. Routledge. pp. 147–. ISBN 978-1-134-19218-2 – via Google Books.
- van der Veer, Peter (1994). Religious Nationalism: Hindus and Muslims in India. University of California Press. ISBN 978-0-520-08256-4 – via Google Books.
