= Le Male =

Men's fragrance introduced in 1995

Jean Paul Gaultier Le Male

Fragrance by Jean Paul Gaultier
- Top notes: Artemisia; mint; cardamom; bergamot
- Heart notes: Lavender; orange blossom; cinnamon; cumin
- Base notes: Sandalwood; vanilla; cedar; tonka bean; amber
- Released: 1995
- Label: Beauté Prestige International (1994–2015); Puig (2016–present)
- Perfumer(s): Francis Kurkdjian
- Flanker(s): List of flanker fragrances
- Website: Le Male

Le Male is a men's fragrance created by Francis Kurkdjian for Jean Paul Gaultier in 1995. It has been manufactured by Puig since 2016, following its production by Shiseido subsidiary Beauté Prestige International from 1995 to 2015. The fragrance was developed as a counterpart to the women's fragrance, Classique, which was introduced in 1993.

A number of flanker fragrances have since been released under the Le Male name. As of writing, the newest flanker is Le Male In Blue, released in 2026.

== Conception and scent ==
"The idea for Le Male was based on a men's hairdresser in the '50s – these were full of the smell of lavender, which is where the perfume's main lavender accord comes from. It's reminiscent of a very good-looking man taking care of himself; kind of preppy, but in a Fifties and Sixties kind of way."

— Kurkdjian discussing the inspiration behind the fragrance, 2004

Le Male is described as an oriental fougere men's fragrance, a classification which is identified by the combination of "warm, woody, and spicy notes" and aromatic notes. The fragrance contains top notes of artemisia, mint, cardamom, and bergamot; middle notes of lavender, orange blossom, cinnamon, and cumin; and base notes of sandalwood, vanilla, cedar, tonka bean, and amber.

Kurkdjian described the Le Male bottle, a male torso wearing a marinière, as "a motif to put it in the 'Gaultier universe'" that represents "[Gaultier's] idea of what men are about – being seductive, being sexual, [and] being adventurous." The fragrance is packaged in an aluminum can, a motif Gaultier has used in his collections since 1980. Kurkdjian recalled believing that the fragrance "[was] not going to work at all" upon seeing the overall packaging because "the bottle not looking like a bottle" was "very unconventional" in the 1990s.

== Release and impact ==
Shiseido subsidiary Beauté Prestige International distributed Jean Paul Gaultier fragrances, including Le Male from launch in 1995, through a license agreement that was to extend from 1991 through June 30, 2016. On January 1, 2016, Puig acquired the fragrance license from Shiseido for $79.2 million and compensated the early termination of the license for $22.6 million. With this purchase, Puig now holds control of both the fashion and fragrance divisions of the Jean Paul Gaultier brand. A new advertising campaign was premiered in Paris during a relaunch party held by Puig on January 28, 2016, in which a joint commercial for Le Male and Classique retains the "Casta diva" aria from the original commercial and American model Chris Bunn portrays the male sailor.

Le Male has since been regarded as a classic men's fragrance by a number of publications, including Forbes, GQ, and Men's Health. Graeme Campbell from Highsnobiety wrote that "like Polo Sport, Diesel Plus Plus, and Versace Blue Jeans, [Le Male] was one of those scents that was simply everywhere at the time [for] anyone who grew up in the '90s or early '00s"; he added that "along with unisex newcomers such as CK One, it blindsided a market dominated by beefier, more masculine fragrances [and] was sexy and fell right in line with the '90s 'metrosexual,' so much that it wasn’t uncommon for women to wear it".

The brand's fragrance general manager Thomas James acknowledged Le Male and Classique as "the flagship of the brand [that] represent all the Jean Paul Gaultier values [and will] continue to be an emblematic and historical pillar" at the launch of the women's fragrance Scandal in 2017.

== Products ==
- Eau de toilette spray – 2.5 fl oz (75 ml)
- Eau de toilette spray – 4.2 fl oz (125 ml)
- Eau de toilette spray – 6.7 fl oz (200 ml)
- Aftershave balm – 3.4 fl oz (100 ml)
- Aftershave lotion – 4.2 fl oz (125 ml)
- Deodorant – 2.5 oz (75 ml)

== Flanker fragrances ==
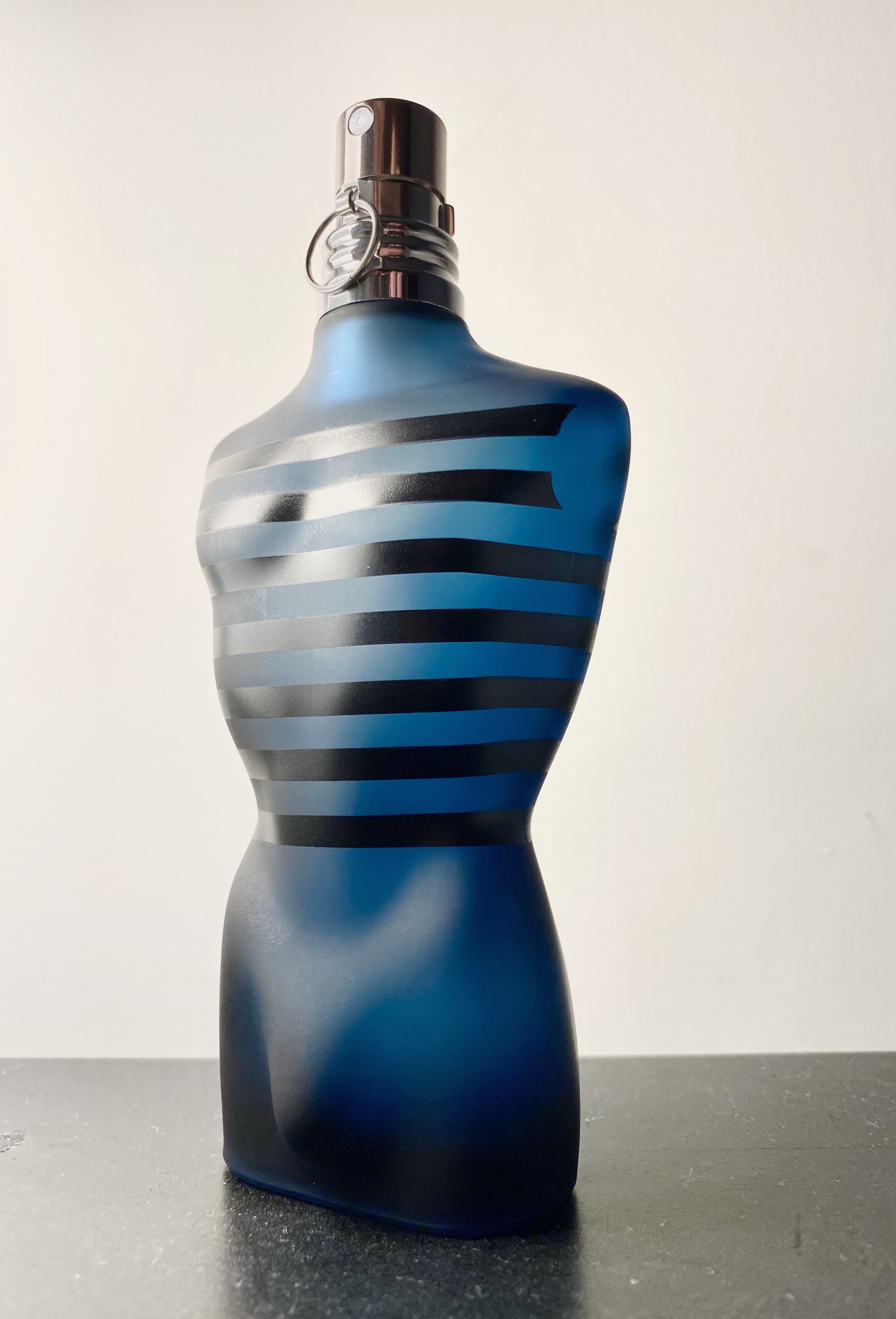
A bottle of Ultra Male, a flanker fragrance of Le Male introduced in 2015

Indicates repackaging of the original fragrance

List of Le Male flanker fragrances
Year	Name	Concentration	Perfumer	Ref.
2003	Le Male Jean Paul Cool	Eau de toilette		
2004	Le Male Eau d'Ete 2004			
2005	Le Male Les d'Ete 2005		Francis Kurkdjian	
2006	Le Male Kilt			
2006	Le Male Stimulating Body Spray		Francis Kurkdjian	
2007	Fleur du Male		Francis Kurkdjian	
2007	Le Male Scuba Diver			
2007	Le Male Tonique Cologne			
2008	Cologne Tonique Le Male Summer 2008			
2008	La Cologne Fleur du Male		Francis Kurkdjian	
2009	Le Male Limited Edition 2009			
2009	Le Male Summer 2009			
2010	Le Male Prestige Edition			
2010	Le Male Summer 2010	Eau de toilette		
2010	Le Male Terrible		Aurelien Guichard	
2010	Super Le Male Collector			
2011	Le Male Love Actually			
2011	Le Male Shaker			
2011	Le Male Silver My Skin			
2011	Le Male Summer 2011	Eau de toilette		
2011	Le Male Terrible Shaker	Eau de toilette	Aurelien Guichard	
2012	Le Male Gladiator			
2012	Le Male Summer 2012	Eau de toilette		
2013	Le Beau Male	Eau de toilette	Francis Kurkdjian	
2013	Le Male Couple			
2013	Le Male Summer 2013	Eau de toilette		
2014	Le Beau Male Capitaine Collector	Eau de toilette	Francis Kurkdjian	
2014	Le Beau Male Edition Collector	Eau de toilette	Francis Kurkdjian	
2014	Le Beau Male Summer 2014	Eau de toilette		
2014	Le Male Capitaine Collector			
2014	Le Male Edition Collector			
2014	Le Male Pin-Up Collectors Edition			
2014	Le Male Summer 2014	Eau de toilette		
2015	Le Male Pirate Edition			
2015	Le Male Summer 2015	Eau de toilette		
2015	Ultra Male	Eau de toilette intense	Francis Kurkdjian	
2016	Le Male Essence de Parfum	Eau de Parfum	Quentin Bisch	
2016	Le Male Popeye Eau Fraiche	Eau de toilette	Nathalie Gracia-Cetto	
2017	Le Male Collector Edition 2017			
2017	Le Male Superman Eau Fraiche	Eau de toilette	Nathalie Gracia-Cetto	
2018	Le Male Collector Edition 2018			
2018	Le Male Eau Fraiche André Edition	Eau de toilette	Nathalie Gracia-Cetto	
2018	Le Male Eau Fraiche Gaultier Airlines	Eau de toilette	Nathalie Gracia-Cetto	
2018	Le Male In the Navy	Eau de toilette	Quentin Bisch	
2018	Le Male In the Navy	Eau de toilette	Nathalie Gracia-Cetto	
2019				
2019	Le Male Collector's Snow Globe			
2019	Le Male Supreme Edition	Eau de toilette	Francis Kurkdjian	
2020	Le Male Aviator	Eau de toilette	Christophe Raynaud	
2020	Le Male Airlines			
2020	Le Male Pride Collector			
2020	Le Male Le Parfum	Eau de Parfum	Quentin Bisch	
2020	Le Male Le Parfum	Eau de Parfum	Nathalie Gracia-Cetto	
2020	Le Male X-Mas Edition 2020			
2021	Le Beau Le Parfum	Parfum		
2022	Le Male On Board	Eau de toilette	Christophe Raynaud	
2023	Le Male Elixir	Parfum		
2024	Le Male Lover	Eau de Parfum	Quentin Bisch	Nathalie Gracia-Cetto
2024	Le Beau Paradise Garden	Eau De Parfum		
2025	Le Beau Flower Edition	Eau De Parfum		
2025	Le Male Elixir Absolu	Parfum		
2026	Le Male in Blue	Eau de Parfum		
