= Classique (fragrance) =

Women's fragrance introduced in 1993

Fragrance by Jean Paul Gaultier
- Top notes: Rose; rum
- Heart notes: Narcissus; vanilla orchid
- Base notes: Vanilla; amber; tonka bean; sandalwood
- Released: 1993
- Label: Beauté Prestige International (1993–2015); Puig (2016–present)
- Flanker(s): List of flanker fragrances
- Website: Classique

Classique (originally JPGaultier Eau de Parfum) is a women's fragrance created by Jacques Cavallier for Jean Paul Gaultier in 1993. It has been manufactured by Puig since 2016, and was previously manufactured by Shiseido subsidiary Beauté Prestige International from 1995 until 2015. The men's fragrance Le Male was developed as a counterpart to Classique, and was introduced in 1995.

A number of flanker fragrances have since been released on the strength of the Classique name. In 2021, the fragrance La Belle Le Parfum was launched.

== Conception and scent ==
Classique is described as an oriental floral women's fragrance, a classification which is identified by the combination of a "sweet, warm, powdery base" and flowery or spicy notes. The eau de parfum Classique contains top notes of rose and rum; middle notes of narcissus and vanilla orchid; and base notes of vanilla, amber, tonka bean, and sandalwood.

The bottle design, a female torso wearing a pink corset, has been compared to the corset Gaultier designed for Madonna for her 1990 Blond Ambition World Tour. The fragrance is packaged in an aluminum can, a motif he has used in his collections since 1980; Gaultier felt that "it was in some way a kind of a provocation to put it in something very industrial," and noted that some perfume shops did not offer the fragrance because it was "scandalous". Media personality Kim Kardashian was accused of copying the Classique bottle design for her KKW Body fragrance in April 2018. She claimed that "[Classique is] iconic and celebrates the woman’s body, but [that her] inspiration was a statue [and] wanted [hers] to be really personal with [her] exact mold." Gaultier responded that "[he] couldn’t put [his] body [for a women's perfume], so [he] put a different body. She did her own body, so it's different."

== Release and impact ==
The fragrance was released as JPGaultier Eau de Parfum in 1993, and renamed as Classique in 1995.

Shiseido subsidiary Beauté Prestige International distributed Jean Paul Gaultier fragrances, including Classique from launch in 1993, through a license agreement that was to extend from 1991 through June 30, 2016. On January 1, 2016, Puig acquired the fragrance license from Shiseido for $79.2 million and compensated the early termination of the license for $22.6 million. With this purchase, Puig now holds control of both the fashion and fragrance divisions of the Jean Paul Gaultier brand. A new advertising campaign was premiered in Paris during a relaunch party held by Puig on January 28, 2016, in which a joint commercial for Classique and Le Male retains the "Casta diva" aria from the original commercial and Dutch model Daphne Groeneveld portrays the lead female figure.

The brand's fragrance general manager Thomas James acknowledged Classique and Le Male as "the flagship of the brand [that] represent all the Jean Paul Gaultier values [and will] continue to be an emblematic and historical pillar" at the launch of the women's fragrance Scandal in 2017.

== Products ==
- Eau de toilette spray – 3.3 fl oz (100 ml)

== Flanker fragrances ==
Indicates repackaging of the original fragrance

List of Classique flanker fragrances
Year	Name	Concentration	Perfumer	Ref.
1997	Jean Paul Gaultier Summer			
1997	Classique L'Eau d'Ete			
1998	Classique Robe Velours	Eau de toilette		
2001	Classique La Robe Chinoise	Eau de toilette		
2003	Classique Eau d'été 2003	Eau de toilette		
2003	Classique Limited Edition 2003			
2004	Classique L'Eau d'Ete Sans Alcohol			
2005	Classique Bien Roulee			
2005	Classique Corset Couture	Perfume extract		
2005	Classique Les d'Ete 2005			
2005	Classique Rock Star			
2006	Classique Alcohol Free Summer Fragrance 2006			
2006	Classique Autumn Winter			
2006	Classique Prestige		Steve DeMercado	
2007	Classique l'Eau d'Ete 2007			
2008	Classique Gold Collection	Eau de toilette		
2008	Classique Summer Fragrance 2008			
2009	Classique Summer Fragrance 2009			
2010	Classique Charm Edition	Eau de toilette		
2010	Classique Summer 2010	Eau de toilette		
2010	Classique X	Eau de toilette	Jacques Cavallier	
2010	Classique X Extrait	Perfume extract		
2011	Classique Love Actually		Jacques Cavallier	
2011	Classique X Jewel Edition		Jacques Cavallier	
2011	Classique Silver My Skin		Jacques Cavallier	
2011	Classique Summer 2011	Eau de toilette		
2011	Classique X Love Actually		Jacques Cavallier	
2012	Classique Summer 2012	Eau de toilette		
2012	Classique X Eau de Parfum	Eau de parfum		
2012	Classique X L'Eau	Eau de toilette	Jacques Cavallier	
2013	Classique Belle en Corset			
2013	Classique Couple	Eau de toilette		
2013	Classique Summer 2013	Eau de toilette		
2014	Classique Edition Collector		Jacques Cavallier	
2014	Classique Intense	Eau de parfum	Francis Kurkdjian	
2014	Classique Summer Edition 2014	Eau de toilette		
2015	Classique Collector Glam Edition			
2015	Classique Intense Collector Glam Edition			
2015	Classique Pirate Edition	Eau de toilette	Jacques Cavallier	
2015	Classique Summer 2015	Eau de toilette		
2016	Classique Betty Boop Eau Fraiche	Eau de toilette	Daphne Bugey	
2016	Classique Essence de Parfum	Eau de parfum	Daphne Bugey	
2017	Classique Eau de Parfum Collector 2017	Eau de parfum	Jacques Cavallier	
2017	Classique Eau de Toilette Collector 2017	Eau de toilette		
2017	Classique Wonder Woman Eau Fraiche	Eau de toilette	Daphne Bugey	
2018	Classique Collector Edition 2018			
2018	Classique Eau Fraiche André Edition	Eau de toilette	Daphne Bugey	
2018	Classique Eau Fraiche Gaultier Airlines	Eau de toilette	Daphne Bugey	
2019	Classique Cabaret Eau de Parfum	Eau de parfum		
2019	Classique Collector's Snow Globe		Jacques Cavallier	
2019	La Belle		Quentin Bisch	
2019	La Belle		Sonia Constant	
2020	Classique Pin Up			
2020	Classique Airlines	Eau de parfum		
2020	Classique Eau de Toilette X-Mas Edition 2020	Eau de toilette		
2021	La Belle Le Parfum	Parfum	Quentin Bisch	
2021	La Belle Le Parfum	Parfum	Sonia Constant	
