= Imperialism in Asia =

Imperialism in Asia may refer to:

- empires in Asia, see List of empires
  - Achaemenid Empire
  - Sasanian Empire
  - Chinese Empire
  - Maurya Empire
  - Chola Empire
  - Gupta Empire
  - Mongol Empire
  - Safavid Empire
  - Mughal Empire
  - Ottoman Empire
  - Maratha Empire
  - Sikh Empire
  - Japanese Empire
- Western imperialism in Asia
  - British Indian Empire

== See also ==
- Gunpowder empires
- Indian Empire (disambiguation)
