= Centrestage (event) =

CENTRESTAGE
- Status: active
- Genre: Fashion trade show
- Frequency: Annually
- Country: Hong Kong
- Founder: Hong Kong Trade Development Council (HKTDC)
- Most recent: 17–19 September 2020
- Next event: September 2021
- Participants: Fashion brands from around the world
- Website: www.centrestage.com.hk

CENTRESTAGE is an international fashion trade show organised annually by the Hong Kong Trade Development Council (HKTDC).

== History ==
The Hong Kong Trade Development Council (HKTDC) first launched CENTRESTAGE in 2016 as a new promotion and launch platform for international Asian fashion brands and designs.

The fourth edition of the fashion trade show was staged from 4 to 7 September 2019 at the Hong Kong Convention and Exhibition Centre. The 2019 show attracted some 240 fashion brands from 23 countries and regions, and attracted close to 7,000 buyers from 74 countries and regions. Many other fashion events were held during the trade show, including runway shows, designer sharing sessions, industry seminars and networking events.

== Purpose ==
CENTRESTAGE is organised to promote fashion designers' collection and brands from around the world.

== See also ==
- Hong Kong Trade Development Council
- Hong Kong Convention and Exhibition Centre
