= Indian Empire =

Indian Empire or the Kingdom of India may refer to:

- Maurya Empire (322 BCE – 185 BCE)
- Gupta Empire (c. 240–c. 550)
- Chalukya Empire (543–1189)
- Rashtrakuta Empire (753–982)
- Chola Empire (848–1279)
- Delhi Sultanate (1206–1526)
- Vijayanagara Empire (1336–1646)
- Mughal Empire (1526–1857)
- Maratha Empire (1674–1818)
- Sikh Empire (1799–1849)
- Company Raj (1757–1858)
- British Raj (1858–1947)

== See also ==
- Imperialism in Asia (disambiguation)
- Emperor of India
- British India
- List of Indian monarchs
