= Ada Zanditon =

Fashion designer of London, United Kingdom

- Born: London, England
- Occupation: Fashion Designer

Ada Zanditon is a fashion designer born and based in London. She is a graduate of the London College of Fashion. She was featured regularly in the Esthetica showcase of the London Fashion Week from 2009 - 2013. She has also displayed her collections at the Berlin Fashion Week in 2013. She is also an advocate of fair trade practices and environmental awareness.

== Early life ==
Zanditon has claimed that she knew that she wanted to be a fashion designer from the age of six. She finished her college studies in London, and went on to do an internship at Alexander McQueen to build her confidence in her choice of career, and also spent some time in Paris gaining experience in the industry.

== Career ==
After graduating from the London College of Fashion in 2007, Zanditon made her debut at the London Fashion Week in 2009 with her collection "The Colony", which was inspired by the plight of endangered bee species. After winning the Masters of Linen – Creativity award, also in 2009, Zanditon was able to create her first ready-to-wear collection, and was also chosen for the British Fashion Council's eco-fashion mentoring programme, improving her business under the guidance of Bev Malik.

=== 2010 ===
Zanditon's third appearance at the London Fashion Week was in February 2010, when her bat-inspired collection "Echolocation" was featured. In the fall of that year, her Spring/Summer '11 collection "Pyramora" captured significant attention at the first London Fashion Week sustainable fashion catwalk show, organised by Prince Charles and Anna Wintour. She also won the EFF & Fairtrade Foundation's Innovation Award at the Somerset House that year.

=== 2011 ===
In 2011 she presented her A/W '11 collection "The Cryoflux", at London Fashion Week. The collection featured the "Waterfall Dress", which was worn by Jameela Jamil at the Glamour Awards in June 2011.

In February, she was commissioned by jewellers Ingle and Rhode to design the first ever fairtrade, fairmined gold necklace. Zanditon was also chosen to be one of fifteen high-profile designers to be a part of the Fairtrade Collective that year, for which she designed a scarf made entirely of fairtrade cotton.

Since 2011, most of Zanditon's collections have been displayed through film as well as the classic catwalk and showcase. This new tradition started with the film for Zandition's Spring/Summer ' 12 collection, "Poseisus", named for Poseidon, the Greek god of the sea, and his "son" Pegasus, the mythical winged white horse. The inspiration for this collection is mostly inspired by seahorses.

=== 2012 ===
Her second film, done for her A/W 12 collection Simia Mineralis, was inspired by the endangered mountain gorilla, and evokes cultural turmoil sparked by the industrial revolution.

For her S/S 2013 collection, Zanditon continued her effort to use fashion as a campaign to raise awareness about endangered species, this time highlighting the plight of the Asian tiger through her collection "Tigris Reign". The film associated with the collection follows the story of the Tigress and the Hunter, and the adventure that eventually brought each unable to do the other harm. The Tigress is featured wearing many of the silkier, more flowing pieces of the collection, while the Hunter is featured primarily in the pieces inspired by British Indian Army uniforms.

=== 2013 ===
For her A/W 2013 collection, Zanditon continued her effort to raise awareness about the Asian Tiger, this time with the collection "March of the Tigress".

After an inspiring trip to Sri Lanka, Zanditon based her S/S 2014 collection, "Aqualibrium", on the endangered sea turtle, as is evident in the associated video "She Who Changes", in which all of the collection pieces, which includes several pieces of swimwear, are modelled underwater. Half of the collection is incredibly vibrant and colourful, while the other half is mostly black and monochromatic. The inspiration for the colour pieces is drawn from the patterns on the turtle shells, with the colouring of Sri Lankan street art.
